= Theodor W. Adorno bibliography =

The following is a list of the major work by Theodor W. Adorno, a 20th-century German philosopher, sociologist and critical theorist associated closely with the Frankfurt School. This list also includes information regarding English translation.

== Collected works ==
Adorno's Gesammelte Schriften [GS] are published by Suhrkamp Verlag. Edited by Rolf Tiedemann, with Gretel Adorno, Susan Buck-Morss and Klaus Schultz, the twenty volume edition of Adorno's writings were published from 1970 to 1986. Additionally, his Nachgelassene Schriften [NaS], edited by the Theodor W. Adorno Archive, includes his lecture courses, as well as incomplete works.

== Writings ==
Year	Original German	English Translation
1933	Kierkegaard: Konstruktion des Ästhetischen, GS 2.	Kierkegaard: Construction of the Aesthetic, trans. by Robert Hullot-Kentor (Minneapolis: University of Minnesota Press, 1989)
1944/1947	with Max Horkheimer, Dialektik der Aufklärung: Philosophische Fragmente, GS 3	with Max Horkheimer, Dialectic of Enlightenment, trans. by Edmund Jephcott (Stanford: Stanford University Press, 2002)
1947	with Hanns Eisler, Komposition für den Film	with Hanns Eisler, Composing for the Films (New York: Continuum Publishing, 2005)
1949	Philosophie der neuen Musik, GS 12	Philosophy of New Music, trans. by Robert Hullot-Kentor (Minneapolis: University of Minnesota Press, 2006)
1950		with Else Frenkel-Brunswik, Daniel J. Levinson, R. Nevitt Sanford, The Authoritarian Personality (New York: Harper & Brothers, 1950)
1951	Minima Moralia. Reflexionen aus dem beschädigten Leben, GS 4	Minima Moralia: Reflections from Damaged Life, trans. by Edmund Jephcott (London: New Left Books, 1974)
1952	Versuch über Wagner, GS 13	In Search of Wagner, trans. R. Livingstone, London: New Left Books, 1981
1955	Prismen. Kulturkritik und Gesellschaft, GS 10.1	Prisms, trans. S. Weber and S. Weber (Cambridge, Massachusetts: MIT Press, 1981)
1956	Zur Metakritik der Erkenntnistheorie. Studien über Husserl und die phänomenologischen Antinomien, GS 5	Against Epistemology: A Metacritique; Studies in Husserl and the Phenomenological Antinomies, trans. W. Domingo (Cambridge, Massachusetts: MIT Press, 1982)
1956	Dissonanzen. Musik in der verwalteten Welt	
1958	Noten zur Literatur I GS 11	Notes to Literature I, ed. R. Tiedemann, trans. S. Weber Nicholsen, (New York: Columbia University Press, 1991)
1959	Klangfiguren. Musikalische Schriften I, GS 16	Sound Figures, trans. Rodney Livingstone (Stanford: Stanford University Press, 1999)
1960	Mahler. Eine musikalische Physiognomie, GS 13	Mahler: A Musical Physiognomy, trans. S. Weber Nicholsen (Cambridge, Massachusetts: MIT Press, 1993)
1961	Noten zur Literatur II GS 11	Notes to Literature II, ed. R. Tiedemann, trans. S. Weber Nicholsen, (New York: Columbia University Press, 1992)
1962	Einleitung in die Musiksoziologie. Zwölf theoretische Vorlesungen.	Introduction to the Sociology of Music (New York: Continuum Publishing, 1988)
1963	Drei Studien zu Hegel GS 5	Hegel: Three Studies, trans. S. Weber Nicholsen (Cambridge, Massachusetts: MIT Press, 1993)
1963	Eingriffe. Neun kritische Modelle, GS 10.2	Critical Models: Interventions and Catchwords, trans. H. W. Pickford (New York: Columbia University Press, 1998)
1963	Quasi una fantasia. Musikalische Schriften II, GS 16	Quasi una Fantasia, trans. Rodney Livingstone (London: Verso Books, 1992)
1964	Jargon der Eigentlichkeit. Zur deutschen Ideologie, GS 6	The Jargon of Authenticity, trans. K. Tarnowski and F. Will (London: Routledge & Kegan Paul, 1973)
1964	Moments musicaux. Neu gedruckte Aufsätze 1928–1962, GS 17	In Night Music: Essays on Music 1928-1962, trans. Wieland Hoban (New York: Seagull Books, 2009)
1966	Negative Dialektik, GS 6	Negative Dialectics, trans. E. B. Ashton (New York: Seabury Press, 1973)
1968	Berg. Der Meister des kleinsten Übergangs, GS 13	Alban Berg: Master of the Smallest Link, trans. J. Brand and C. Hailey (New York: Cambridge University Press, 1991)
1969	Stichworte. Kritische Modelle 2, GS 10.2	Critical Models: Interventions and Catchwords, trans. H. W. Pickford (New York: Columbia University Press, 1998)

== Lectures ==
- Zur Bekämpfung des Antisemitismus heute, Lecture to the First European Pedagogical Conference, Wiesbaden, November 2, 1962.
- Der Jargon der Eigentlichkeit. Hessischer Rundfunk, Abendstudio, April 9, 1963.
- Aspekte des neuen Rechtsradikalismus, Lecture to the Socialist Students of Austria, University of Vienna, April 6, 1967. Published as Aspects of the New Right-Wing Extremism, Cambridge: Polity Press 2020, ISBN 978 1 509541454
- Kritik am Positismus. Zum Grundsatzstreit in der deutschen Soziologie. Hessischer Rundfunk, Abendstudio, February 11, 1969.

== Posthumously published writings ==
Year	Original German	English Translation
1970	Ästhetische Theorie, GS 7	Aesthetic Theory, trans. R. Hullot-Kentor (Minneapolis: University of Minnesota Press, 1997)
1993	Beethoven. Philosophie der Musik. Fragmente und Texte. hrsg. von Rolf Tiedemann, NaS 1:2	Beethoven: The Philosophy of Music; Fragments and Texts, ed. R. Tiedemann, trans. E. Jephcott (Cambridge: Polity Press, 1998)
1995	Kants "Kritik der reinen Vernunft"(1959), hrsg. von Rolf Tiedmann	Kant's Critique of Pure Reason, trans. Rodney Livingstone (Cambridge: Polity Press, 2001)
1996	Probleme der Moralphilosophie(1963), hrsg. von Thomas Schröder	Problems of Moral Philosophy, trans. Rodney Livingstone (California: Stanford University Press, 2000)
2006	Current of Music. Elements of a Radio Theory, hrsg. von Robert Hullot-Kentor	Current of Music, trans. Robert-Hullot Kentor (Malden, MA: Polity Press, 2009)

== Correspondence ==
Original German	English Translation
Briefe an die Eltern 1939-1951, ed. Christoph Godde, Henri Lonitz	Letters to His Parents 1939-1951 (Malden, MA: Polity Press, 2006)
