= Classificatory disputes about art =

Disputes about what should and should not be classified as art

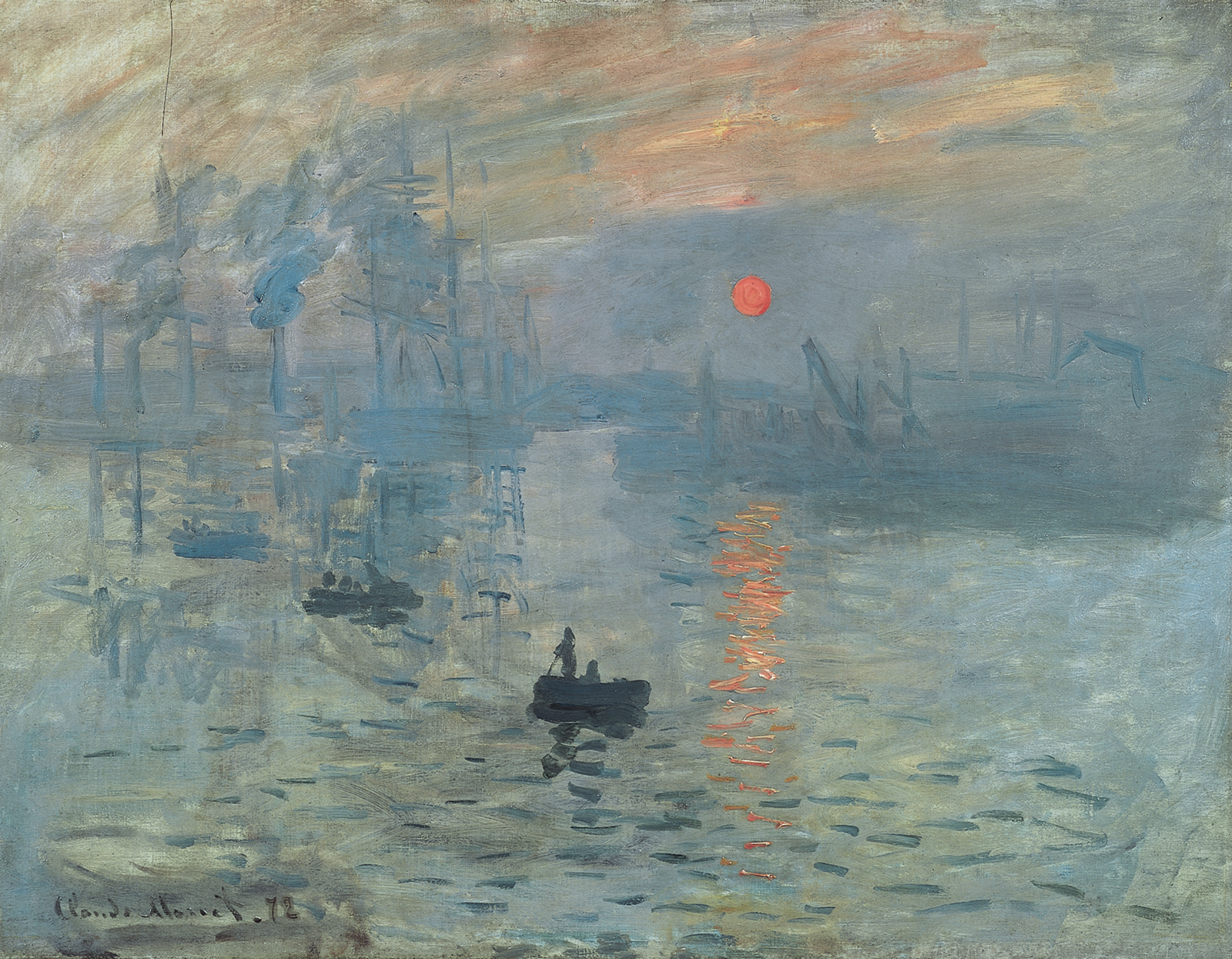
Claude Monet, Impression, soleil levant (Impression, Sunrise), 1872, oil on canvas, Musée Marmottan Monet

Art historians and philosophers of art have long had classificatory disputes about art regarding whether and how a particular cultural artifact or manmade object should be classified as art and how the arts relate to one another and to the world, often as part of a broader systematic philosophy or focused theory of aesthetics. Disputes continue about what does and does not count as art.

== Definitions of art ==
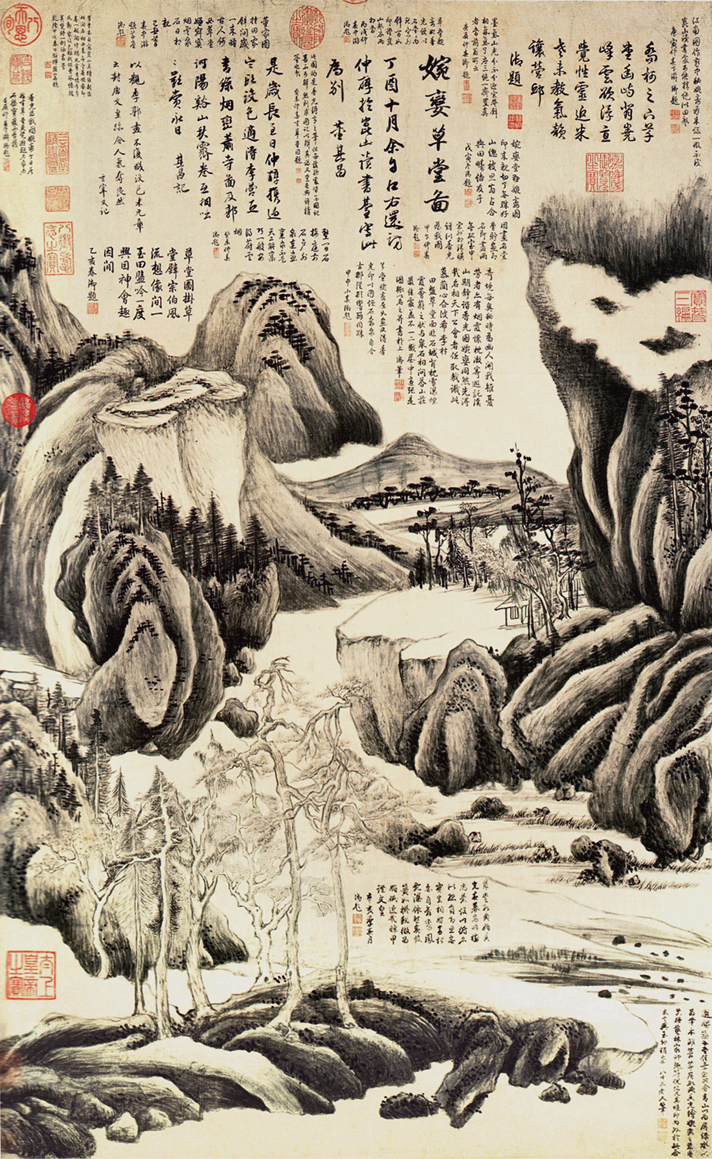
Dong Qichang, Landscape 1597. Dong Qichang was a high-ranking Ming civil servant, painting imaginary landscapes in the Chinese tradition of literati painting, with collector's seals and poems.

Defining art can be difficult. Aestheticians and art philosophers often engage in disputes about how to define art. By its original and broadest definition, art (from the Latin ars, meaning "skill" or "craft") is the product or process of the effective application of a body of knowledge, most often using a set of skills; this meaning is preserved in such phrases as "liberal arts" and "martial arts". However, in the modern use of the word, which rose to prominence after 1750, "art" is commonly understood to be skill used to produce an aesthetic result.

Britannica Online defines it as "a visual object or experience consciously created through an expression of skill or imagination". But how best to define the term "art" today is a subject of much contention; many books and journal articles have been published arguing over even the basics of what we mean by the term "art". Theodor Adorno claimed in 1969 "It is self-evident that nothing concerning art is self-evident any more." It is not clear who has the right to define art. Artists, philosophers, anthropologists, and psychologists all use the notion of art in their respective fields, and give it operational definitions that are not very similar to each other's.

The second, more narrow, more recent sense of the word "art" is roughly as an abbreviation for creative art or "fine art." Here, the definition is that skill is being used to express the artist's creativity, or to engage the audience's aesthetic sensibilities. Often, if the skill is being used to create objects with a practical use, rather than paintings or sculpture with no practical function other than as an artwork, it will be considered as falling under classifications such as the decorative arts, applied art and craft rather than fine art. Likewise, if the skill is being used in a commercial or industrial way, it will be considered design instead of art. Some thinkers have argued that the difference between fine art and applied art has more to do with value judgments made about the art than any clear definitional difference. The modern distinction does not work well for older periods, such as medieval art, where the most highly regarded art media at the time were often metalwork, engraved gems, textiles and other "applied arts", and the perceived value of artworks often reflected the cost of the materials and sheer amount of time spent creating the work at least as much as the creative input of the artist.

== Schemes of classification of arts ==
=== Historical schemes ===
==== Antiquity ====
In the Zhou dynasty of ancient China, excellence in the liù yì (六藝), or "Six Arts", was expected of the junzi (君子), or "perfect gentleman", as defined by philosophers like Confucius. Because these arts spanned both the civil and military aspects of life, excelling in all six required a scholar to be very well-rounded and polymathic. The Six Arts were as follows:

- Rites (禮)
- Music (樂)
- Archery (射)
- Charioteering and equestrianism (御)
- Calligraphy (書)
- Mathematics (數)

Later in the history of imperial China, the Six Arts were pared down, creating a similar system of four arts for the scholar-official caste to learn and follow:

- Qín (琴), an instrument representing music
- Qí (棋), a board game representing military strategy
- Shū (書), or Chinese calligraphy, representing literacy
- Huà (畫), or Chinese painting, representing the visual arts

Another attempt to systematically define art as a grouping of disciplines in antiquity is represented by the ancient Greek Muses. Each of the standard nine Muses symbolized and embodied one of nine branches of what the Greeks called techne, a term which roughly means "art" but has also been translated as "craft" or "craftsmanship", and the definition of the word also included more scientific disciplines. These nine traditional branches were:

- Epic poetry, embodied by Calliope
- History, embodied by Clio
- Music and lyric poetry, embodied by Euterpe
- Love poetry, embodied by Erato
- Tragedy, embodied by Melpomene
- Hymns and pantomime, embodied by Polyhymnia
- Dance and chorus, embodied by Terpsichore
- Comedy and idyllic poetry, embodied by Thalia
- Astronomy, embodied by Urania

==== Middle Ages and Renaissance ====
In medieval Christian Europe, universities taught a standard set of seven liberal arts, defined by early medieval philosophers such as Boethius and Alcuin of York and as such centered around philosophy. The definitions of these subjects and their practice was heavily based on the educational system of Greece and Rome. These seven arts were themselves split into two categories:

- the Trivium, considered the foundation of knowledge, and comprising the three basic elements of philosophy: grammar, logic, and rhetoric;
- and the Quadrivium, comprising music, arithmetic, geometry and astronomy.

At this time, and continuing after the Renaissance, the word "art" in English and its cognates in other languages had not yet attained their modern meaning.

==== Modern and 19th-century philosophy ====
Among the first works of philosophy to discuss art in a modern framework was Immanuel Kant's Critique of Judgment. Kant built on the pioneering aesthetic work of Alexander Gottlieb Baumgarten, and Friedrich Wilhelm Joseph Schelling's Philosophy of Art, which emphasized myth.

As their work in aesthetics had done, Georg Wilhelm Friedrich Hegel's Lectures on Aesthetics includes a systematic hierarchy of the five major arts from most material to most expressive:

1. architecture
2. sculpture
3. painting
4. music
5. poetry

For Hegel, mind coming to know itself (absolute spirit) develops successively through art, religion, and philosophy. Within art, this development is more or less mirrored, proceeding from the symbolic through the classical to the romantic form. August Wilhelm Schlegel and Karl Wilhelm Ferdinand Solger also developed their own schematic aesthetics, and Karl Rosenkranz continued this development.

Arthur Schopenhauer's aesthetics features a hierarchical framework that valorizes music. It has been distinguished by its historic influence on the Symbolist movement and composers, including Richard Wagner and Arnold Schoenberg. In response to Schopenhauer and Wagner, and in a substantial reversal of Hegel, Friedrich Nietzsche's The Birth of Tragedy contrasts the Apollonian and Dionysian, particularly Dionysian myth with Socratic (philosophical) reason.

==== 20th century onward ====
Hegel's aesthetics caught on particularly in France, and with continual modifications the list has remained relevant and a subject of debate in French culture into the 21st century. This classification was popularized by Ricciotto Canudo, an early scholar of film who wrote "Manifesto of the Seventh Art" in 1923. The epithets given to each discipline by its placement of the list are often used to refer to them through paraphrase, particularly with calling film "the seventh art".

Theodor W. Adorno's Aesthetic Theory, emerging from the tradition of Hegelian dialectic and Nietzschean perspectivism, followed in the vein of Negative Dialectics by arguing that art retains critical truths precisely where philosophical conceptualization falls short. Adorno continued attending to the historical development of art, including its medium and form, and its autonomy and social function, contrasting high culture with the culture industry, as in his and Max Horkheimer's Dialectic of Enlightenment and his Philosophy of New Music.

The French Ministry of Culture often participates in the decision making for defining a "new" art. The ten arts are generally given as follows:

1. architecture
2. sculpture
3. painting
4. music
5. literature, including poetry and prose
6. the performing arts, including dance and theatre
7. film and cinema
8. les arts médiatiques, including radio, television, and photography
9. comics
10. video games, or digital art forms more generally

The ongoing dispute over what should constitute the next form of art has been fought for over a century. Currently, there are a variety of contenders for le onzième art, many of which are older disciplines whose practitioners feel that their medium is underappreciated as art. One particularly popular contender for the 11th is multimedia, which is intended to bring together the ten arts just as Canudo argued that cinema was the culmination of the first six arts. Performance art, as separate from the performing arts, has been called le douzième, or "twelfth", art.

=== Generalized definitions of art ===
The traditional Western classifications since the Renaissance have been variants of the hierarchy of genres based on the degree to which the work displays the imaginative input of the artist, using artistic theory that goes back to the ancient world. Such thinking received something of a boost with the aesthetics of Romanticism. A similar theoretical framework applied in traditional Chinese art; for example in both the Western and Far Eastern traditions of landscape painting (see literati painting), imaginary landscapes were accorded a higher status than realistic depictions of an actual landscape view – in the West relegated to "topographical views".

Many have argued that it is a mistake to even try to define art or beauty, that they have no essence, and so can have no definition. Often, it is said that art is a cluster of related concepts rather than a single concept. Examples of this approach include Morris Weitz and Berys Gaut. Drawing on Ludwig Wittgenstein, Weitz argued that art is an "open concept" whose constituents and criteria for inclusion could change over time; he also sought to distinguish purely "descriptive" from "evaluative" uses of the term art.

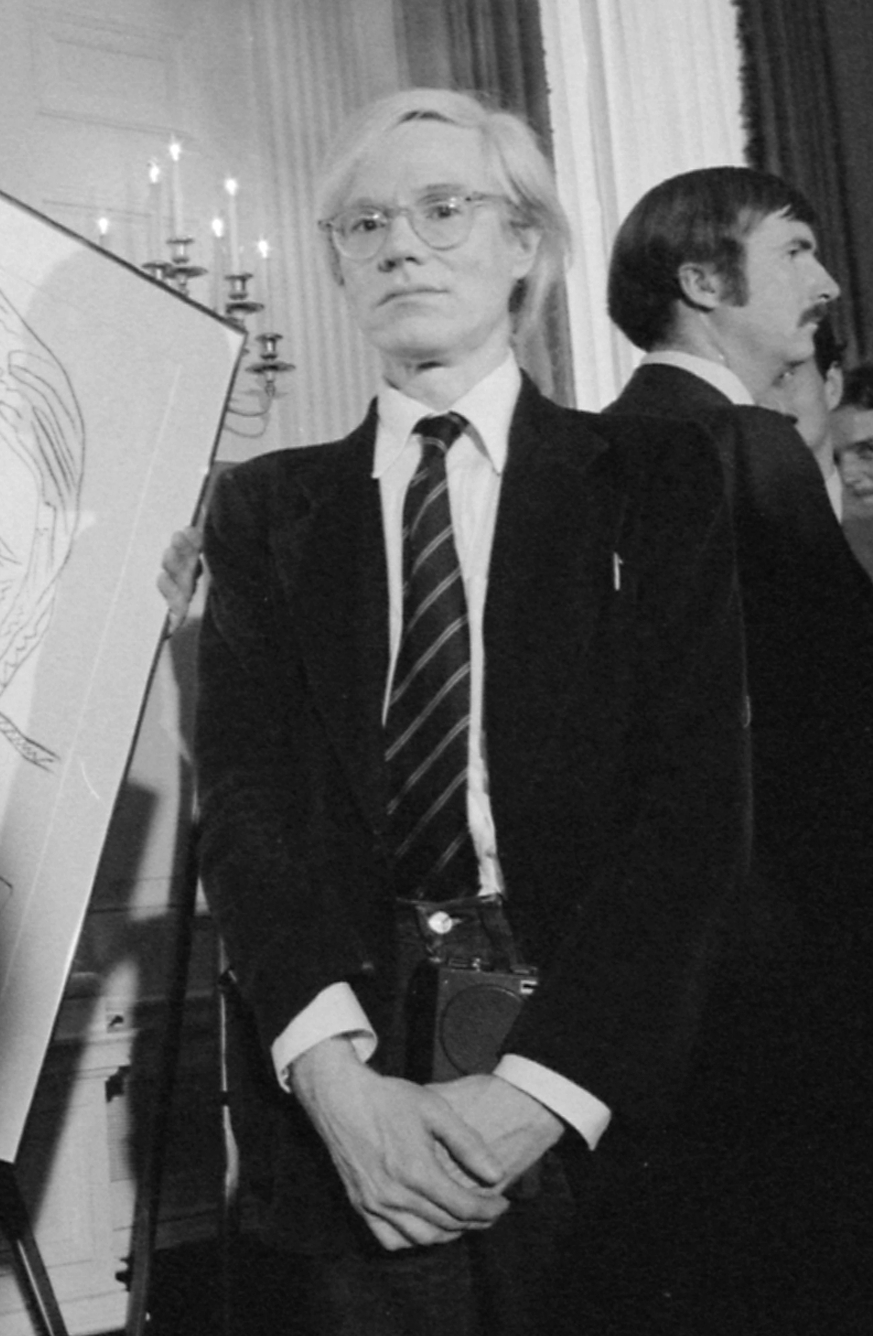
Andy Warhol exhibited wooden sculptures of Brillo Boxes as art.

Another approach is to say that "art" is basically a sociological category, that whatever art schools and museums, and artists get away with is considered art regardless of formal definitions. This institutional theory of art has been championed by George Dickie. Most people did not consider a store-bought urinal or a sculptural depiction of a Brillo Box to be art until Marcel Duchamp and Andy Warhol (respectively) placed them in the context of art (i.e., the art gallery), which then provided the association of these objects with the values that define art.

Proceduralists often suggest that it is the process by which a work of art is created or viewed that makes it "art", not any inherent feature of an object, or how well received it is by the institutions of the art world after its introduction to society at large. For John Dewey, for instance, a writer's intent to call a writing a "poem" should control, whether other poets acknowledge it or not. Whereas if exactly the same set of words was written by a journalist, intending them as shorthand notes to help him write a longer article later, these would not be a poem.

Leo Tolstoy in his seminal 1898 text What is Art?, on the other hand, claims that what makes something art or not is how it is experienced by its audience, not by the intention of its creator. Functionalists, like Monroe Beardsley argue that whether a piece counts as art depends on what function it plays in a particular context. For instance, the same Greek vase may play a non-artistic function in one context (carrying wine), and an artistic function in another context (helping us to appreciate the beauty of the human figure).

== Disputes about classifying art ==
Philosopher David Novitz has argued that disagreements about the definition of art are rarely the heart of the problem, rather that "the passionate concerns and interests that humans vest in their social life" are "so much a part of all classificatory disputes about art." According to Novitz, classificatory disputes are more often disputes about our values and where we are trying to go with our society than they are about theory proper.

On the other hand, Thierry de Duve argues that disputes about the definition of art are a necessary consequence of Marcel Duchamp's presentation of a readymade as a work of art. In his 1996 book Kant After Duchamp he reinterprets Kant's Critique of Judgement exchanging the phrase "this is beautiful" with "this is art", using Kantian aesthetics to address post-Duchampian art.

=== Conceptual art ===
The work of the French artist Marcel Duchamp from the 1910s and 1920s paved the way for the conceptualists, providing them with examples of prototypically conceptual works (the readymades, for instance) that defied previous categorisations. Conceptual art emerged as a movement during the 1960s. The first wave of the "conceptual art" movement extended from approximately 1967 to 1978. Early "concept" artists like Henry Flynt, Robert Morris and Ray Johnson influenced the later, widely accepted movement of conceptual artists like Dan Graham, Hans Haacke, and Douglas Huebler.

More recently, the "Young British Artists" (YBAs), led by Damien Hirst, came to prominence in the 1990s and their work is seen as conceptual, even though it relies very heavily on the art object to make its impact. The term is used in relation to them on the basis that the object is not the artwork, or is often a found object, which has not needed artistic skill in its production. Tracey Emin is seen as a leading YBA and a conceptual artist, even though she has denied that she is and has emphasised personal emotional expression.

==== Recent examples of disputed conceptual art ====
===== 1991 =====
Charles Saatchi funds Damien Hirst. The following year, the Saatchi Gallery exhibits Hirst's The Physical Impossibility of Death in the Mind of Someone Living, a shark in formaldehyde in a vitrine.

===== 1993 =====
Vanessa Beecroft holds a performance in Milan, Italy. Here, young girls act as a second audience to the display of her diary of food.

===== 1999 =====
Tracey Emin is nominated for the Turner Prize. Her work My Bed consisted of her disheveled bed, surrounded by detritus such as condoms, blood-stained knickers, bottles and her bedroom slippers.

===== 2001 =====
Work No. 227: The lights going on and off, by Martin Creed, Tate Britain

Martin Creed wins the Turner Prize for accurately titled Work No. 227: The lights going on and off, in which lights turned on and off in an otherwise empty room.

===== 2002 =====
Miltos Manetas confronts the Whitney Biennial with his Whitneybiennial.com.

===== 2005 =====
Simon Starling wins the Turner Prize for Shedboatshed. Starling presented a wooden shed which he had converted into a boat, floated down the Rhine, then remade into a shed.

==== Controversy in the UK ====
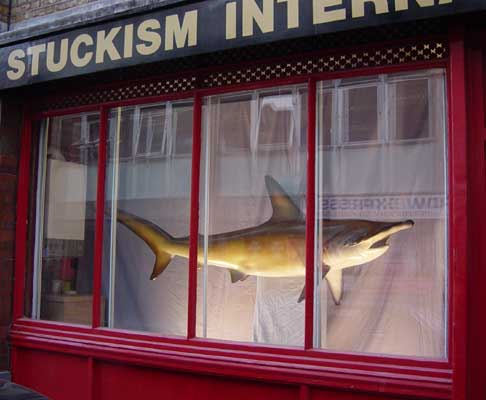
A Dead Shark Isn't Art, Stuckism International Gallery, 2003

The Stuckist group of artists, founded in 1999, proclaimed themselves "pro-contemporary figurative painting with ideas and anti-conceptual art, mainly because of its lack of concepts." They also called it pretentious, "unremarkable and boring" and on 25 July 2002, in a demonstration, deposited a coffin outside the White Cube gallery, marked "The Death of Conceptual Art". In 2003, the Stuckism International Gallery exhibited a preserved shark under the title A Dead Shark Isn't Art, clearly referencing the Damien Hirst work (see disputes above).

In a BBC2 Newsnight programme on 19 October 1999 hosted by Jeremy Paxman with Charles Thomson attacking that year's Turner Prize and artist Brad Lochore defending it, Thomson was displaying Stuckist paintings, while Lochore had brought along a plastic detergent bottle on a cardboard plinth. At one stage Lochore states, "if people say it's art, it's art". Paxman asks, "So you can say anything is art?" and Lochore replies, "You could say everything is art..." At this point Thomson, off-screen, can be heard to say, "Is my shoe art?" while at the same time his shoe appears in front of Lochore, who observes, "If you say it is. I have to judge it on those terms." Thomson's response is, "I've never heard anything so ludicrous in my life before."

In 2002, Ivan Massow, the Chairman of the Institute of Contemporary Arts branded conceptual art "pretentious, self-indulgent, craftless tat" and in "danger of disappearing up its own arse ... led by cultural tsars such as the Tate's Sir Nicholas Serota". Massow was consequently forced to resign. At the end of the year, the Culture Minister, Kim Howells, an art school graduate, denounced the Turner Prize as "cold, mechanical, conceptual bullshit".

In October 2004, the Saatchi Gallery told the media that "painting continues to be the most relevant and vital way that artists choose to communicate." Following this, Charles Saatchi began to sell prominent works from his YBA (Young British Artists) collection.

=== Computer and video games ===
Computer games date back to 1947, although they did not reach much of an audience until the 1970s. Computer and video games include many kinds of art (the concept "art" itself is, as indicated, open to a variety of definitions). The graphics of a video game constitute digital art, graphic art, and probably video art. The original soundtrack of a video game constitutes music. But it remains a point of debate whether the video game itself should be considered an artwork, perhaps a form of interactive art or participatory art.

Film critic Roger Ebert, for example, went on record claiming that video games are not art, and for structural reasons will always be inferior to cinema, but then admitted his lack of knowledge in the area when he affirmed that he "will never play a game when there is a good book to be read or a good movie to be watched". Video game designer Hideo Kojima has argued that playing a videogame is not art, but games do have artistic style and incorporate art. Video game designer Chris Crawford argues that video games are art. Esquire columnist Chuck Klosterman also argues that video games are art.

== See also ==
- Anti-art and Anti-anti-art
- Art criticism
- Art history
- Beauty
- Contemporary art
- Definition of music
- Degenerate art
- Formalism (art)
- Gesamtkunstwerk, the synthesis of multiple classes of art
- Ideasthesia
- Myth (mythos) and logos (word or reasoned discourse)
- Rockism and poptimism, ideologies in popular music criticism
- Unity of opposites
