= Fragments on Wagner =

1939 Wagner article by Theodor W. Adorno

"Fragments on Wagner" (German: "Fragmente über Wagner") is a 1939 journal article by philosopher Theodor W. Adorno. It was an early contribution to the Frankfurt School's emerging analysis of antisemitism, which Adorno approached through an analysis of composer Richard Wagner and his work. Philosopher Walter Benjamin responded positively to the material, though "Fragments" received limited attention amid war. Adorno's larger manuscript, from which the article was derived, was later published as the monograph Versuch über Wagner (1952; trans. In Search of Wagner, 1981).

== Background and influences ==
"Fragments on Wagner" (German: "Fragmente über Wagner") is an article by philosopher Theodor W. Adorno, published in 1939 in the Zeitschrift für Sozialforschung (Journal for Social Research) of the Institute for Social Research. One of Adorno's Frankfurt School colleagues, philosopher Max Horkheimer, had touched on Jewish identity in an aphorism ("Belief and Profit" from Dawn and Decline or Dämmerung, 1926–31), but they emigrated from Nazi Germany having viewed antisemitism less as a social, psychological, or cultural phenomenon than through the lens of class conflict.

The material came from Adorno's larger Wagner manuscript, begun with Horkheimer's encouragement in London in autumn 1937. Later, Adorno recalled that it had been tied to earlier Frankfurt School writings, including Horkheimer's extended essay "Egoism and the Freedom Movement" (1936). Philosopher Walter Benjamin, their colleague, provided feedback on Adorno's material, and Adorno drew on Benjamin's theory of aversion. Adorno also quoted from the antisemitic fairytale "The Jew Among Thorns" collected by the Brothers Grimm.

In 1938, Adorno wrote that he had finished what he called his "notes on Wagner", and he excerpted and summarized the material as "Fragments". Later, leaving the "Fragments" sections largely unchanged while revising some of the unpublished material, he developed the manuscript into his first published musical monograph, Versuch über Wagner (1952). (In 1981, Rodney Livingstone translated Versuch into English not as Essay on Wagner, but as In Search of Wagner.)

== Contents ==
"Fragments" has four sections in the same numbered sequence as Versuch's ten chapters: Social Character, Phantasmagoria, God and Beggar, and Chimera. It lacks Versuch's epigraph, "Horses are survivors/of the age of heroes", which Adorno had used in "Motifs" (1937), his essay of aphorisms on music. (Later published in Adorno's Quasi una fantasia in 1963, "Motifs" is not Versuch's "Motiv" chapter.)

In "Fragments", Adorno analyzed Wagner's antisemitism as expressing the sadomasochism in his worldview and as unmasking alignment with the bourgeoisie. Then he linked Wagner's social character and works by analyzing their gestures, leitmotifs, endless melody, harmony, and orchestration, terming the effect of these "phantasmagoria" insofar as Wagner uses them to conceal the technical means beneath his music's surface. Next, Adorno described Der Ring des Nibelungen (The Ring of the Nibelung) as a revolution (of the canon) undone by its rebel god Wotan's beggarly impotence. Finally, Adorno contrasted Wagner's pessimism, understood as nihilism or utopian hope amid decline, with Schopenhauer's earlier pessimism.

== Reception ==
Most Zeitschrift copies, Adorno wrote, were destroyed under German military administration in occupied France during World War II.

"Fragments" was debated in a polemic essay by political theorist Josef Weber titled "The Ring of the Nibelung: The Case of Richard Wagner – The Art of Freedom and Interpretation in the Middle of the Twentieth Century" (1944), which was published in the German periodical Dinge der Zeit in 1947 and its English counterpart Contemporary Issues in 1954. Weber's essay was endorsed by philosopher Herbert Marcuse, and Adorno acknowledged Weber's essay but never responded substantively, later writing that he considered his views supported by evidence in other recent publications, including Wagner's correspondence with Ludwig II of Bavaria and Ernest Newman's Wagner biography.

== See also ==
- German Wikipedia – Richard Wagner § Theodor W. Adorno's reception
- "Das Judenthum in der Musik" ("Judaism in Music") – Antisemitic work on music theory by Richard Wagner
- Dialectic of Enlightment – 1947 book by Max Horkheimer and Theodor W. Adorno
- Freudo-Marxism – Philosophical perspectives informed by Freud and Marx
- Klang – Concept in Riemannian and Schenkerian theories
- Klangfarbenmelodie – Musical concept that treats timbre as a melodic element
- Notes to Literature – Nonfiction work by T. W. Adorno
- Psychoanalytic sociology – Application of psychoanalysis to sociology
- Social relation – Any interpersonal relationship between two or more conspecifics between/within groups
- Western Marxism – Current of Marxist theory
