= The Threat to Reason =

Book by Dan Hind

- Author: Dan Hind
- Publication date: 2007
- ISBN: 1-844-67152-6

The Threat to Reason is a book by Dan Hind, published by Verso Books.

In the book, Hind argues that the Enlightenment has been 'hijacked' by corporate and state interests who use it to justify their activities. Their claim to represent true Enlightenment values has been used to justify a range of controversial events from the Iraq War to the need for unregulated corporations.

The central point is that the mainstream perception of the "enemies of reason" distracts attention from the real threat of corporate and government corruption of Enlightenment principles.

Hind also articulates Max Horkheimer's idea that "the Enlightenment is authoritarian".

The conclusion to his book upholds Immanuel Kant's view that the Enlightenment involves intellectual adulthood and making moral decisions independent of those above us in social, economic or political hierarchies. To do this, our true thoughts must be made available publicly through open access platforms. By contributing one's expertise and knowledge to the public domain, we can "become the authors of our own Enlightenment".

The book received a wide variety of reviews.
