= Gordon Finlayson =

British philosopher

Gordon Finlayson FRSA
- Born: 9 September 1964 (age 62)

Education
- Education: University of St Andrews; University of Essex
- Thesis: Structure and Genesis of Hegel's Critique of the "Ought" (1994)

Philosophical work
- Era: 21st-century philosophy
- Region: Western philosophy
- School: Continental
- Institutions: University of Sussex
- Main interests: Kantian philosophy
- Website: jamesgordonfinlayson.com

James Gordon Finlayson FRSA (born 9 September 1964) is a British philosopher. He was a reader in philosophy and a former director of the Centre for Social and Political Thought at the University of Sussex. Finlayson is a Fellow of the Royal Society of Arts and a former chair of the Society for European Philosophy (2007–2011).

== Books ==
- Habermas: A Very Short Introduction, Oxford University Press, 2005 ISBN 9780192840950
- Habermas and Rawls: Disputing the Political, Fabian Freyenhagen and Gordon Finlayson, Routledge, 2010 ISBN 978-0-415-87686-5
- The Habermas-Rawls Debate, Columbia University Press, 2019 ISBN 9780231549011
