= Kant with Sade =

Essay by Jacques Lacan

- French language edition titled Kant avec Sade (1963)
- Author: Jacques Lacan
- Original title: Kant avec Sade
- Translator: James B. Swenson, Jr.
- Language: French
- Subject: Psychoanalysis
- Publication date: 1963
- Publication place: France
- English publication date: 1989

Kant with Sade is an essay by Jacques Lacan in which the author examines a link between the works of Immanuel Kant and Marquis de Sade. The original (French: Kant avec Sade) was published in the journal Critique in April 1963.

== See also ==
- Kantian ethics
- Seminars of Jacques Lacan
- Gaze
- Psychoanalytic theory
- Dialectic of Enlightenment
