= Adorno's Practical Philosophy =

2013 book by Fabian Freyenhagen

Adorno's Practical Philosophy: Living Less Wrongly
- Author: Fabian Freyenhagen
- Published: 2013
- Publisher: Cambridge University Press
- Pages: 298 pp.
- ISBN: 9781139567763

Adorno's Practical Philosophy: Living Less Wrongly is a 2013 book by the philosopher Fabian Freyenhagen, in which the author reconstructs and defends the philosopher Theodor W. Adorno's practical philosophy and tries to respond to the charge that Adorno's thought has no practical import or coherent ethics.
