= Fabian Freyenhagen =

British philosopher (born 1978)

- Born: 1 September 1978 (age 46)

Education
- Education: University of Oxford (BA); University of Sheffield (PhD)
- Thesis: Adorno's Negativistic Ethics (2005)
- Doctoral advisors: Robert Stern, Leif Wenar

Philosophical work
- Era: 21st-century philosophy
- Region: Western philosophy
- School: Continental
- Institutions: University of Essex
- Main interests: Kantian philosophy, critical theory
- Notable ideas: Negativistic ethics (skepticism about traditional normative ethics)

Fabian Freyenhagen (born 1 September 1978) is a British philosopher and Professor of Philosophy at the University of Essex. He is known for his expertise on critical theory and Kantian ethics.

== Books ==
- Adorno's Practical Philosophy: Living Less Wrongly, Cambridge University Press, 2013 ISBN 9781139567763
- Habermas and Rawls: Disputing the Political, Fabian Freyenhagen and Gordon Finlayson, Routledge, 2010 ISBN 978-0-415-87686-5
- The Legacy of John Rawls, edited by Fabian Freyenhagen and Thom Brooks, London: Continuum, 2005 ISBN 978-0826478436

== See also ==
- Instrumental and value-rational action
