= Gretel Adorno =

German chemist (1902–1993)

- Born: Margarete Karplus; 10 June 1902; Berlin, German Empire
- Died: 16 July 1993 (aged 91); Frankfurt am Main, Germany
- Spouse: Theodor W. Adorno (m. 1937; died 1969)

Philosophical work
- Main interests: Frankfurt School, critical theory, philosophy

Margarete "Gretel" Adorno (/əˈdɔːrnoʊ/ ə-DOR-noh; German: [aˈdɔʁno]; née Karplus; 10 June 1902 – 16 July 1993) was a German chemist and intellectual figure within the Frankfurt School of critical theory.

== Family and childhood ==
Gretel Karplus was born in Berlin on 10 June 1902, the granddaughter of the Viennese industrialist Gottlieb Karplus, and the daughter of Joseph and Amalie Karplus. She had one sister, Liselotte; they would both go on to receive doctorates. The Karplus' childhood home was situated in Prinzenallee, near the Tiergarten, Berlin.

== Education ==
She obtained her doctoral degree in chemistry from Friedrich Wilhelm University, Berlin, which she attended between 1921 and 1925, after the successful completion of her dissertation entitled "Über die Einwirkung von Calciumhydrid auf Ketone" ("On the Influence of Calcium-hydrate on Cetane") on 4 August 1925, under the supervision of Professor Dr. Wilhelm Schlenk, according to Stacy Lynn von Boeckmann's account of Karplus' university records. However, Gretel Adorno's colleague, Rolf Tiedemann, wrote in her obituary that she had studied under Professor Max Born; thus Born is often cited as her doctoral adviser, accordingly. She was just 23 at the time she received her promotion to Doctor of Philosophy, and she also completed doctoral coursework in two additional minors, Physics and Philosophy, with cum laude across all three subjects.

== Relationship with Theodor Adorno ==
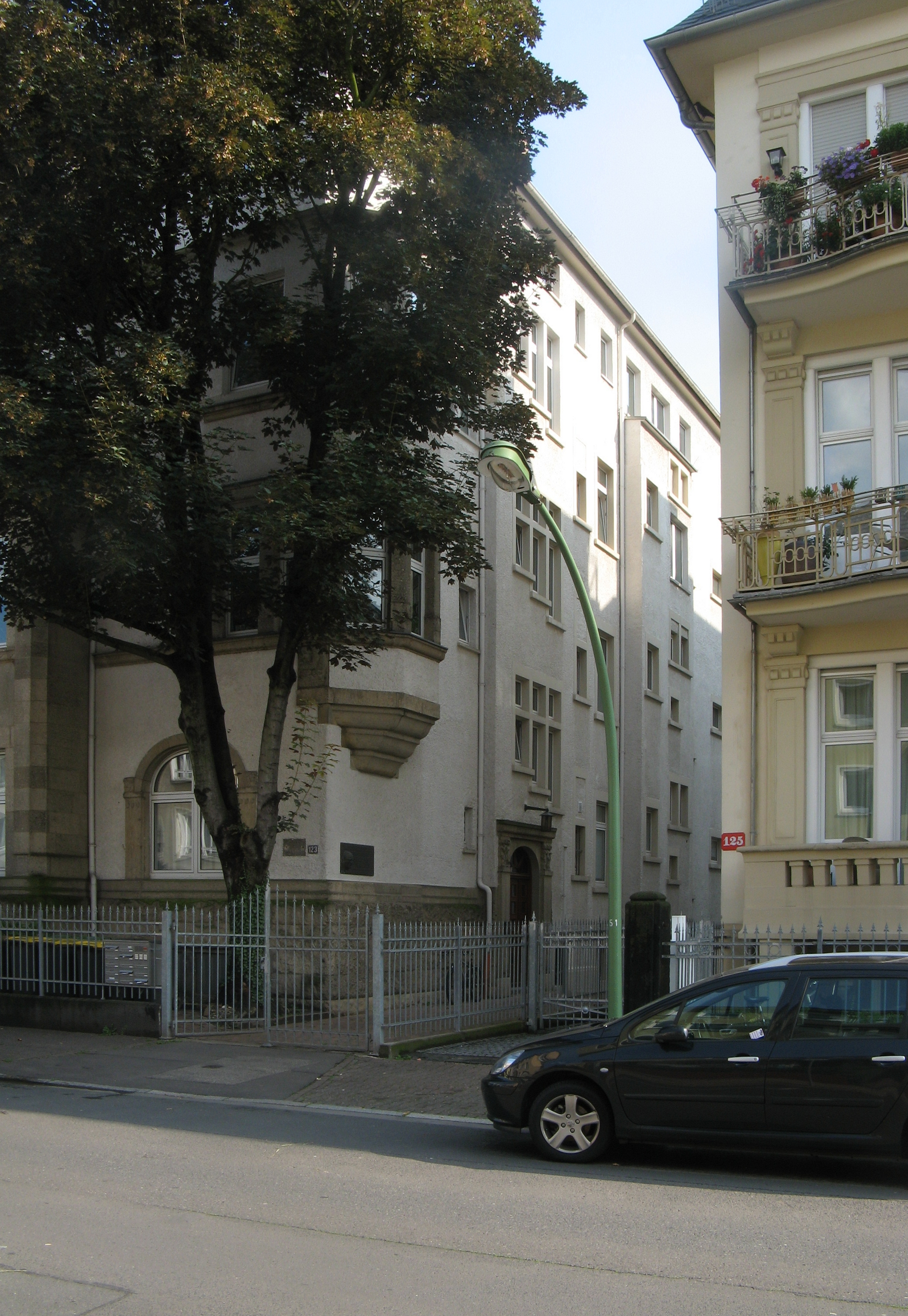
49 bis 69 Kettenhofweg, Frankfurt, the house in which the Adornos lived from 1949

=== Marriage ===
The Adornos wed in 1937, after more than fourteen years of courtship. That courtship was for a significant amount of time conducted over long-distance; Karplus confided in their close mutual friend, Walter Benjamin, that this separation was the cause of much long-term emotional strain upon her.

==== Extramarital relationships ====
Adorno had at least two affairs with other women during more than forty years of marriage to Gretel, including a long-term affair with Charlotte Alexander during their years in Los Angeles, as well as an encounter with a woman known as "Carol" which is detailed in a diary entry. Adorno's biographer, Stefan Müller-Doohm, cites several additional affairs, including an extramarital relationship with Reneé Nell during their years in L.A., a lawyer called 'Eva,' and a family friend called 'Arlette' who travelled with them on holiday to Switzerland. Not only did Adorno write about his affairs and sexual fantasies about other women in his dream notes, diary, and in detailed letters to his mother, Gretel Adorno was herself involved in typing out various documents of this nature, and the couple did explicitly discuss some of the extended affairs.

=== Adorno's death ===
Amidst growing student protests in Frankfurt, Adorno died of a sudden heart-attack in August 1969. Gretel Adorno was the individual who wrote the following death notice in the Frankfurter Rundschau: “Theodor W. Adorno, born on 11 September 1903, died quietly in his sleep on 6 August 1969.”

== Friendships of note ==
In her university days Berlin and prior to meeting Adorno, Gretel Karplus was already acquainted with many influential German intellectuals of the twenties, including Ernst Bloch and Bertolt Brecht.

=== Friendship with Walter Benjamin ===
Notably, she became close friends with the German Jewish philosopher, essayist, and cultural critic Walter Benjamin, whom their mutual acquaintance Siegfried Kracauer would later that year introduce to her then suitor, Theodor Adorno; at this point, 1923, Adorno was at that time still a university student at Johann Wolfgang Goethe University in Frankfurt. Karplus' only sibling, Liselotte, became the second wife of Benjamin's cousin, Egon Wissing who was a doctor. Gretel herself was in frequent contact with Wissing both before and after the Adornos wed in 1937 and soon after emigrated to the U.S.

The letters between Gretel Adorno and Benjamin suggest that their friendship was not only personal, but also professional. She often assisted him by critiquing drafts of his work, including his large project, Passagenarbeit (The Arcades Project). This work had led to professional tensions between Theodor Adorno and Walter Benjamin, due to the former's concerns over Bertolt Brecht's increasing influence over Benjamin's thinking, which Adorno believed betrayed his waning commitment to negative theology. Gretel Adorno wrote personally to Benjamin in 1934 regarding her "great reservations" towards Brecht's "often palpable lack of clarity," advising Benjamin to be cautious in that intellectual friendship. After Benjamin committed suicide in 1940, Gretel and Theodor Adorno worked to secure the publication of his works with Suhrkamp Verlag.

== Early career ==
After obtaining her doctorate, Karplus became a business woman and continued to reside in Berlin with financial independence up until she and Adorno emigrated from Nazi Germany to the United States in 1937. Once her investment in the partially family-owned leather factory Karplus & Herzberger was liquidated in 1933, Karplus became the junior partner and partial owner of the firm Georg Tengler, which manufactured leather gloves and was situated in Berlin. When the senior partner, Tengler, died in 1934, Karplus became responsible for the factory and its more than 200 employees until she determined to liquidate the company in December 1936 for unknown reasons (Boeckmann suggests that this may have been because the relevant state records and Chamber of Commerce archives were partially destroyed in the war years). Her approximate income was cited at 8000dm per annum in 1933–4, which increased to 12,000dm from 1934 to 1935, with a sudden decline in 1936.

== Career within the Frankfurt School ==
=== Stenography ===
==== Dialectic of Enlightenment ====
Gretel Adorno assisted her husband Adorno and his intellectual partner Max Horkheimer in developing the manuscript for Dialectic of Enlightenment. Adorno and Horkheimer acknowledged her in the foreword to that work: "In the extension of our theory and the accompanying mutual experiences Gretel Adorno has been a precious helper."

==== Diskussion über Theorie und Praxis ====
Reissued by Verso Books in 2011 as Towards a New Manifesto, this work was a series of recorded improvised conversations in 1956 between Adorno and Horkheimer, which was to be a contemporary version of Karl Marx and Friedrich Engels's The Communist Manifesto. Gretel remarkably was able to take down what Martin Jay describes as a "highly abstract conversation developing at breakneck speed".

=== Secretarial work ===
Her assistance in recording and editing the verbal and written drafts of Dialectic of Enlightenment was neither the first nor the last time she worked alongside Adorno and Horkheimer in their intellectual activities. From 1937, the year that Gretel married Adorno, she assisted on almost all initial drafts of Adorno's works, which were dictated to her and taken down in shorthand.

Gretel was involved in all of her husband's intellectual endeavours. Whilst the couple were living in the United States during World War II, Adorno for the most part refused to write in English, which meant that Gretel was required to translate his works into English.

=== Editing Aesthetic Theory ===
When Theodor Adorno died suddenly in 1969 without having finalised the manuscript of Aesthetic Theory, Gretel Adorno and Adorno's former student Rolf Tiedemann took up the task of bringing that document to completion and publication. They discuss in the Editor's Afterword how "Adorno’s metaphor for works of art applies literally to the last philosophical text on which he worked:

‘The fragment is the intrusion of death into the work. While destroying it, it removes the stain of semblance.’ The text of Aesthetic Theory, as it was in August 1969, which the editors present here as faithfully as possible, is the text of a work in progress; this is not the form in which Adorno would have published this book. Several days before his death he wrote in a letter than the final version ‘still needed a desperate effort’ but that ‘basically it is now a matter of organization and hardly that of the substance of the book.’ Of this substance, according to Adorno, ‘essentially everything is, as one says, all there.'

== Health issues ==
For much of her life, Gretel Adorno suffered from acute chronic health issues that doctors were unable to accurately diagnose; they are frequently mentioned in both her letters to Benjamin, and Adorno's letters to his parents. These issues often left her immobilised for days and at times weeks on end. She died July 16th 1993 in Frankfurt.
