= Minima Moralia =

1951 book by Theodor W. Adorno

Minima Moralia: Reflections From Damaged Life
- Cover of the German edition
- Author: Theodor W. Adorno
- Original title: Minima Moralia: Reflexionen aus dem beschädigten Leben
- Language: German
- Subject: Philosophy
- Published: 1951
- Publication place: Germany
- Media type: Print

Minima Moralia: Reflections from Damaged Life (German: Minima Moralia: Reflexionen aus dem beschädigten Leben) is a 1951 critical theory book by German philosopher Theodor W. Adorno. Adorno started writing it during World War II, in 1944, while he lived as an exile in America, and completed it in 1949. It was originally written for the 50th birthday of his friend and collaborator Max Horkheimer, who had co-authored the earlier book Dialectic of Enlightenment with Adorno.

The book consists of 153 aphorisms and short essays that reflect on the nature of modern life and the impact of capitalism, fascism, and mass culture on the individual. Adorno critiques the alienation, conformity, and loss of individuality in modern society, arguing that the conditions of late capitalism have made it impossible to lead a genuine, fulfilling life.

He explores themes such as the commodification of culture, the decline of critical thinking, and the erosion of personal relationships. Historian of Philosophy Peter E. Gordon argues that the "task of Minima Moralia is to assist us in seeing the redemptive surplus that lies unrealised at the interstices of everyday experience."

The book exercised a profound influence over the development of critical theory, and, along with his other major books, has continued to influence generations of scholars, writers and artists across fields including aesthetics, moral philosophy, cultural studies, sociology, psychology, and music criticism.

== Title ==
The book takes its title from Magna Moralia (latin: "Great Ethics"), a work on ethics traditionally attributed to Aristotle. Adorno's title translates to "minimal ethics" reflecting the bleak mood following World War II, and suggesting a great system of ethics is no longer possible. Instead, philosophy can only look at the small, damaged, and fragmented pieces of daily life—the minima—to find any remaining truth.

According to scholar Peter E. Gordon, Adorno felt tremendous guilt at "the very fact" that he had escaped the Nazi regime and survived. "The book's subtitle is a record of this unhealed wound, a bitter confession that even to write about individual experience suggests a complicity with 'unspeakable collective events'."

== Overview ==
In the opening dedication to Horkheimer, Adorno explains the purpose of philosophy, or the "sorrowful science" (a pun on Nietzsche's The Gay Science), is "the teaching of the good life", a central theme of both the Greek and Hebrew sources of Western philosophy. In the mid-20th century, Adorno maintains that a good, honest life is no longer possible, because we live in an inhuman society. "Life does not live", declares the book's opening epigram, a quotation from Ferdinand Kürnberger's book Der Amerikamüde. Adorno illustrates this in a series of short reflections and aphorisms into which the book is broken, moving from everyday experiences to disturbing insights on general tendencies of late industrial society. Adorno discusses the subversive nature of toys, the desolation of the family, the ingenuity of being genuine, the decay of conversation, the rise of occultism, the use and abuse of semicolons, and the history of tact. Adorno shows how the smallest changes in everyday behavior stand in relation to the most catastrophic events of the twentieth century.

The book acknowledges its roots in the "damaged life" of its author, one of many intellectuals driven into exile by fascism, who, according to Adorno, are "mutilated without exception". But as one of its aphorisms reads, "The splinter in your eye is the best magnifying glass." So, as splinters left over from the smashed mirror of philosophy, the book's fragments try to illuminate clues as to humanity's descent into inhumanity in their immediate surroundings. A kind of post-philosophy working against the "untrue whole" of philosophy proper, Minima Moralia holds fast to a Judeo-Marxian vision of redemption, which it calls the only valid viewpoint with which to engage a deeply troubled world. By bringing the "Messianic light" of criticism on a landscape of consummate negativity, Adorno attempts to "project negatively an image of utopia."

While grieving the irretrievable loss of a paradise of a privileged childhood, Adorno confronts his sheltered existence with the primitive and anti-Semitic "nightmare of childhood" which he saw as being an incipient form of Fascism. He rejected any attempt, under the aegis of the USA, to reconstruct a 19th-century culture because any such attempt would either be false, or would simply set in motion the very same dynamic that had produced fascism, reasoning possibly inspired by Nietzsche's thought experiment of the eternal recurrence.

Redemption would be a final break with a system which he regarded as deterministic in the large, producing, certainly, a variety of alternative "virtual" histories, but virtual histories that would share common characteristics. Musically speaking and as seen in Mahler, certain themes would return, whether first as tragedy and then as tragic and murderous farce (where the farce of the Second Empire produced the unspoken yet real tragedy of the slaughter of the working class in Paris of 1871, one unmentioned and unmourned because the victims are unfashionable today).

== Sources ==
- Jaeggi, Rahel (March 2005) "“No Individual Can Resist”: Minima Moralia as Critique of Forms of Life", Constellations: An International Journal of Critical & Democratic Theory 12(1): pp. 65–82;
