= Negative Dialectics =

1966 book by Theodor W. Adorno

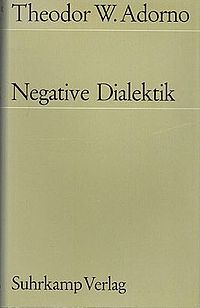
- Cover of the first edition
- Author: Theodor W. Adorno
- Original title: Negative Dialektik
- Translator: E. B. Ashton
- Language: German
- Subject: Philosophy
- Publisher: Suhrkamp Verlag
- Publication date: 1966
- Media type: Print
- Pages: 416 (Routledge edition)
- ISBN: 0-415-05221-1 (Routledge edition)

Negative Dialectics (German: Negative Dialektik) is a 1966 book by the philosopher Theodor W. Adorno, in which he presents a critique of traditional Western philosophy and dialectical thinking. Adorno argues that the Enlightenment's emphasis on reason and progress has led to the domination of nature and the suppression of human individuality, and he develops the notion of negative dialectics as a critique of the positive, idealistic dialectics of Hegel and the Marxist dialectical materialism that grew out of it.

Negative dialectics rejects the idea of a final synthesis or reconciliation, instead emphasizing the importance of maintaining the tension between contradictory elements and resisting the temptation to subsume particulars under abstract, totalizing concepts.

Central to Adorno's argument is his reflection on the Holocaust and the systematic extermination of the Jews at Auschwitz, which he sees as a catastrophic failure of Enlightenment rationality and a profound challenge to the very foundations of philosophical thought. He argues that the experience of Auschwitz demands a fundamental rethinking of the Western philosophical tradition and a new form of critical theory that can grapple with the ethical and metaphysical challenges posed by the Holocaust, writing that a "new categorical imperative has been imposed by Hitler upon unfree mankind: to arrange their thoughts and actions so that Auschwitz will not repeat itself, so that nothing similar will happen."

== Summary ==
Adorno sought to update the philosophical process known as the dialectic, freeing it from traits previously attributed to it that he believed to be fictive. For Georg Wilhelm Friedrich Hegel, the dialectic was a process of realization that things contain their own negation and through this realization the parts are sublated into something greater. Adorno's dialectics rejected this positive element wherein the result was something greater than the parts that preceded and argued for a dialectics which produced something essentially negative. Adorno wrote that "Negative Dialectics is a phrase that flouts tradition. As early as Plato, dialectics meant to achieve something positive by means of negation; the thought figure of the 'negation of the negation' later became the succinct term. This book seeks to free dialectics from such affirmative traits without reducing its determinacy."

Adorno's purpose was to overcome the formal logical limits of the previous definitions of dialectics by putting into light that new knowledge arises less from a Hegelian unification of opposite categories as defined following Aristotelian logic than by the revelation of the limits of knowledge. However, this philosophical project is inseparable from Adorno's reflection on the historical experience of Auschwitz, which he sees as a decisive break that challenges the very foundations of Western philosophical thinking. Adorno argues that the systematic extermination of the Jews cannot be adequately comprehended or represented within the frameworks of traditional philosophy, and his "negative dialectics" is an attempt to develop a mode of thinking that can respond to the ethical and metaphysical challenges posed by the Holocaust.

His emphasis on the non-identity and particularity of objects, his critique of the totalizing tendencies of Enlightenment thought, and his call for a new form of philosophical reflection are all deeply shaped by his conviction that Auschwitz demands a fundamental rethinking of the Western philosophical tradition. Such a revelation reaches out to its experienced object, whose entirety always escapes the simplifying categories of purely theoretical thinking. Adorno raises the possibility that philosophy and its essential link to reality may be essentially epistemological in nature. His reflection moves a step higher by applying the concept of dialectics not only to exterior objects of knowledge, but to the process of thought itself.

To summarize, "...this Negative Dialectics in which all esthetic topics are shunned might be called an “anti-system.” It attempts by means of logical consistency to substitute for the unity principle, and for the paramountcy of the superordinate concept, the idea of what would be outside the sway of such unity. To use the strength of the subject to break through the fallacy of constitutive subjectivity—this is what the author felt to be his task [...]. Stringently to transcend the official separation of pure philosophy and the substantive or formally scientific realm was one of his determining motives."

== Influence ==
Adorno's work has had a large impact on cultural criticism, particularly through Adorno's analysis of popular culture and the culture industry. Adorno's account of dialectics has influenced Joel Kovel, the sociologist and philosopher John Holloway, the anarcho-primitivist philosopher John Zerzan, and the sociologist Boike Rehbein.

The book has also had an influence on Holocaust historiographers, such as Zygmunt Bauman, Yehuda Bauer, and Saul Friedländer. In addition, the memoirs of camp survivors such as Jean Amery and Tadeusz Borowski can be seen as anticipating or otherwise influencing Adorno's thought in Negative Dialectics. Adorno's critique of systemic thinking can explain the taboo of formulating precise explanations for why the Holocaust happened and what specific outcomes the Final Solution intended to achieve. It suggests that in trying to do so, we approach the limits of knowledge; particularly pertaining to the abyss of what was experienced subjectively in the camps, summarized in the phrase "Here is no why," uttered by a camp guard to an inmate at Auschwitz.
