= Notes to Literature =

Nonfiction work by T. W. Adorno

Notes to Literature is a nonfiction two volume work by social and cultural theorist Theodor W. Adorno. The two volumes are a collection of short essays on literary subjects such as Beckett, Balzac, Proust, Thomas Mann, Dickens, Goethe, Heine, the lyric, realism, the essay, and the contemporary novel. The English translation of these volumes was published in 1991 (vol. 1) and 1992 (vol. 2) by Columbia University Press. The volumes were edited by Rolf Tiedemann and Paul Kottman and translated from the original German into English by Shierry Weber Nicholson.

== Synopsis ==
According Paul Kottman, who wrote the introductory chapter, Adorno's main ideas are presented in this collection. He argues that these essays are actually some of Adorno's most important works, not just side projects. Adorno is famous for long, difficult books, but Kottman says his main ideas are easiest to see in these shorter essays. By putting all these essays into two volumes, Kottman shows that Adorno had a consistent plan for how he looked at books and writing. Also, the main goal of this collection serves as a central place for Adorno's philosophy. Kottman says Adorno wrote these works to underscore the human experience and criticize modern life for turning human feelings into nothing more than numbers or data points.

== About the book ==
This work is organized into Volume I and II, with four "Parts," and thirty-five chapters. The work also has a Notes section and an Index. Altogether this collection of essays in about 519 pages.

== See also ==
- Love's Knowledge by Martha C. Nussbaum
- Immediacy, or The Style of Too Late Capitalism by Anna Kornbluh
