= Theodor W. Adorno =

German philosopher, sociologist, and theorist (1903–1969)

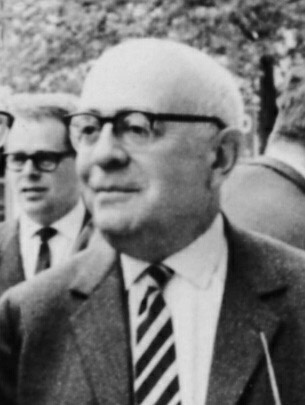
- Adorno in 1964
- Born: Theodor Ludwig Wiesengrund; 11 September 1903; Frankfurt, Hesse-Nassau, Prussia, German Empire
- Died: 6 August 1969 (aged 65); Visp, Valais, Switzerland
- Spouse: Gretel Karplus (m. 1937)

Education
- Education: University of Frankfurt am Main (PhD, 1924; Dr. phil. hab., 1931); Merton College, Oxford
- Thesis: Die Transzendenz des Dinglichen und Noematischen in Husserls Phänomenologie (1924)
- Doctoral advisor: Hans Cornelius
- Other advisor: Gilbert Ryle

Philosophical work
- Era: 20th-century philosophy
- Region: Western philosophy
- School: Continental philosophy; Frankfurt School critical theory; Western Marxism
- Institutions: University of Frankfurt am Main; Columbia University; University of California, Berkeley
- Doctoral students: Hans-Jürgen Krahl, Alfred Schmidt, Albrecht Wellmer
- Notable students: Peter Gorsen, Jürgen Habermas, Alexander Kluge
- Main interests: Social theory; sociology; psychoanalysis; aesthetics; epistemology; musicology; mass media; Marxism
- Notable ideas: Criticism of identity thinking; Criticism of left-wing anti-intellectualism (actionism); Criticism of the "culture industry"; Maturity (Mündigkeit); Negative dialectics; Paradox of aesthetics; Social totality

Theodor W. Adorno (/əˈdɔːrnoʊ/; German: [ˈteːodoːɐ̯ aˈdɔʁno]; born Theodor Ludwig Wiesengrund; 11 September 1903 – 6 August 1969) was a German philosopher, cultural theorist, and music critic. He was a leading member of the Frankfurt School of critical theory, whose work has come to be associated with thinkers such as Ernst Bloch, Walter Benjamin, Max Horkheimer, Erich Fromm, and Herbert Marcuse, for whom the works of Sigmund Freud, Karl Marx, and G. W. F. Hegel were essential to a critique of modern society. As a critic of both fascism and what he called the culture industry, he authored numerous works—such as Dialectic of Enlightenment (1947), Minima Moralia (1951), and Negative Dialectics (1966)—that strongly influenced the European New Left.

In an intellectual climate shaped by existentialism and logical positivism, Adorno developed a dialectical conception of history and philosophy that challenged the foundations of both, anticipating the divide that would later emerge between the analytic and continental traditions. As a classically trained musician, Adorno studied composition with Alban Berg of the Second Viennese School, influenced by his early admiration for the music of Arnold Schoenberg. Adorno's commitment to avant-garde music formed the backdrop of his subsequent writings and led to his collaboration with Thomas Mann on the latter's novel Doctor Faustus (1947), while the two men lived in California as exiles during the Second World War. Working at the newly relocated Institute for Social Research, Adorno collaborated on influential studies of authoritarianism, antisemitism, and propaganda that would later serve as models for sociological studies the institute carried out in post-war Germany.

Upon his return to Frankfurt, Adorno was involved with the reconstitution of German intellectual life through debates with Karl Popper on the limitations of positivist science, critiques of Martin Heidegger's language of authenticity, writings on German responsibility for the Holocaust, and continued interventions into matters of public policy. As a writer of polemics in the tradition of Friedrich Nietzsche and Karl Kraus, Adorno delivered scathing critiques of contemporary Western culture. Adorno's posthumously published Aesthetic Theory (1970), which he had planned to dedicate to Samuel Beckett, is the culmination of a lifelong commitment to modern art, which seeks to revoke the "fatal separation" of feeling and understanding long demanded by the history of philosophy and explode the privilege aesthetics accords to content over form and contemplation over immersion. Adorno was nominated for the 1965 Nobel Prize in Literature by Helmut Viebrock.

== Life and career ==
=== Early years: Frankfurt ===
Theodor W. Adorno was born as Theodor Ludwig Wiesengrund in Frankfurt on 11 September 1903, the only child of Maria Calvelli-Adorno della Piana (1865–1952) and Oscar Alexander Wiesengrund (1870–1946). His mother, a Catholic from Corsica, was once a professional singer, while his father, an assimilated Jew who had converted to Protestantism, ran a successful wine-export business. His mother wanted her son's surname to include her own, Adorno. Thus, his earliest publications carried the name Theodor Wiesengrund-Adorno. Upon his application for US citizenship, his father's surname, Wiesengrund, was dropped from the name.

His mother and aunt provided a vibrant musical life during his childhood. Maria was a singer who could boast of having performed in Vienna at the Imperial Court, while her sister, Agathe, who lived with them, had made a name for herself as both a singer and pianist. He was not only a precocious child but, as he recalled later in life, a child prodigy who could play pieces by Beethoven on the piano by the time he was twelve.

At the age of six, he attended the Deutschherren Middle School before transferring to the Kaiser-Wilhelm Gymnasium, where he studied from 1913 to 1921. Before his graduation at the top of his class, Adorno was already swept up by the revolutionary mood of the time, as is evidenced by his reading of György Lukács's The Theory of the Novel that year, as well as by his fascination with Ernst Bloch's The Spirit of Utopia, of which he would later write:

Bloch's was a philosophy that could hold its head high before the most advanced literature; a philosophy that was not calibrated to the abominable resignation of methodology ... I took this motif so much as my own that I do not believe I have ever written anything without reference to it, either implicit or explicit.

Adorno's intellectual non-conformism was also shaped by the repugnance he felt towards the nationalism that swept through the Reich during the First World War. Along with future collaborators Walter Benjamin, Max Horkheimer, and Ernst Bloch, Adorno was profoundly disillusioned by the ease with which Germany's intellectual and spiritual leaders—among them Max Weber, Max Scheler and Georg Simmel, as well as his friend Siegfried Kracauer—came out in support of the war. The younger generation's distrust for traditional knowledge arose from how this tradition had discredited itself. Over time, Oscar Wiesengrund's firm established close professional and personal ties with the factory of Karplus & Herzberger in Berlin. The eldest daughter of the Karplus family, Margarete, or Gretel, moved into the intellectual circles of Berlin, where she became acquainted with Benjamin, Bertolt Brecht, and Bloch, each of whom Adorno would become familiar with during the mid-1920s. After fourteen years, Gretel Karplus and Adorno were married in 1937.

At the end of his schooldays, Adorno not only benefited from the rich concert offerings of Frankfurt—where one could hear performances of works by Schoenberg, Schreker, Stravinsky, Bartók, Busoni, Delius, and Hindemith—but also began studying music composition at the Hoch Conservatory while taking private lessons with well-respected composers Bernhard Sekles and Eduard Jung. At around the same time, he befriended Siegfried Kracauer, the Frankfurter Zeitung's literary editor, of whom he would later write:

For years Kracauer read [Kant's] Critique of Pure Reason with me regularly on Saturday afternoons. I am not exaggerating in the slightest when I say that I owe more to this reading than to my academic teachers ... Under his guidance, I experienced the work from the beginning not as mere epistemology, not as an analysis of the conditions of scientifically valid judgments, but as a kind of coded text from which the historical situation of spirit could be read, with the vague expectation that in doing so one could acquire something of truth itself.

Leaving grammar school to study philosophy, psychology and sociology at Johann Wolfgang Goethe University in Frankfurt, Adorno continued his readings with Kracauer, turning now to Hegel and Kierkegaard, and began publishing concert reviews and pieces of music for distinguished journals like the Zeitschrift für Musik, the Neue Blätter für Kunst und Literatur and later for the Musikblätter des Anbruch. In these articles, Adorno championed avant-garde music at the same time as he critiqued the failings of musical modernity, as in the case of Stravinsky's The Soldier's Tale, which in 1923 he called a "dismal Bohemian prank." In these early writings, he was unequivocal in his condemnation of performances that either sought or pretended to achieve a transcendence that Adorno, in line with many intellectuals of the time, regarded as impossible. "No cathedral," he wrote, "can be built if no community desires one." In the summer of 1924 Adorno received his doctorate with a study of Edmund Husserl's phenomenology under the direction of the unorthodox neo-Kantian Hans Cornelius. Before his graduation, Adorno had already met his most important intellectual collaborators, Horkheimer and Benjamin. Adorno met Horkheimer through Cornelius's seminars, and Horkheimer subsequently introduced him to Friedrich Pollock.

=== Vienna, Frankfurt, and Berlin ===
During the summer of 1924, the Viennese composer Alban Berg's Three Fragments from Wozzeck premiered in Frankfurt, at which time Adorno introduced himself to Berg and mutually agreed the young philosopher and composer would study with Berg in Vienna. Upon moving to Vienna in February 1925, Adorno immersed himself in the musical culture that had grown up around Schoenberg. In addition to his twice-weekly sessions with Berg, Adorno continued his studies on piano with Eduard Steuermann and befriended the violinist Rudolf Kolisch. In Vienna, he and Berg attended public lectures by the satirist Karl Kraus, and he met Lukács, who had been living in Vienna after the failure of the Hungarian Soviet Republic. Berg, whom Adorno called "my master and teacher," was among the most prescient of his young pupil's early friends:

[I am] convinced that, in the sphere of the deepest understanding of music ... you are capable of supreme achievements and will undoubtedly fulfill this promise in the shape of great philosophical works.

After leaving Vienna, Adorno traveled through Italy, where he met with Kracauer, Benjamin, and the economist Alfred Sohn-Rethel, with whom he developed a lasting friendship, before returning to Frankfurt. In December 1926 Adorno's Two Pieces for String Quartet, Op. 2, was performed in Vienna, providing a welcome interruption from his preparations for the habilitation. After writing the Piano Pieces in strict twelve-tone technique, as well as songs later integrated into the Six Bagatelles for voice and piano, Op. 6, Adorno presented his habilitation manuscript, The Concept of the Unconscious in the Transcendental Theory of the Psyche (Der Begriff des Unbewußten in der transzendentalen Seelenlehre), to Cornelius in November 1927. Cornelius advised Adorno to withdraw his application because the manuscript was too close to his own way of thinking. In the manuscript, Adorno sought to emphasize the epistemological status of the unconscious as it emerged from Freud's early writings. Against the function of the unconscious in both Nietzsche and Spengler, Adorno argued that Freud's notion of the unconscious serves as a "sharp weapon ... against every attempt to create a metaphysics of the instincts and to deify full, organic nature."

Undaunted by his academic prospects, Adorno threw himself once again into composition. In addition to publishing numerous reviews of opera performances and concerts, Adorno's Four Songs for medium voice and piano, Op. 3, was performed in Berlin in January 1929. Between 1928 and 1930, Adorno took on a greater role within the editorial committee of the Musikblätter des Anbruchs. In a proposal for transforming the journal, he sought to use Anbruch to champion radical modern music against what he called the "stabilized music" of Pfitzner, the later Richard Strauss, as well as the neoclassicism of Stravinsky and Hindemith. During this period he published the essays "Night Music," "On Twelve-Tone Technique," and "Reaction and Progress." Yet his reservations about twelve-tone orthodoxy became steadily more pronounced. According to Adorno, twelve-tone technique's use of atonality can no more be regarded as an authoritative canon than can tonality be relied on to provide instructions for the composer.

At this time Adorno struck up a correspondence with the composer Ernst Krenek, discussing problems of atonality and the twelve-tone technique. In a 1934 letter, he sounded a related criticism of Schoenberg:

Twelve-tone technique alone is nothing but the principle of motivic elaboration and variation, as developed in the sonata, but elevated now to a comprehensive principle of construction, namely transformed into an a priori form and, by that token, detached from the surface of the composition.

At this point Adorno reversed his earlier priorities: now his musical activities came second to the development of a philosophical theory of aesthetics. Thus, in the middle of 1929, he accepted Paul Tillich's offer to present a habilitation on Kierkegaard, which Adorno eventually submitted under the title The Construction of the Aesthetic. At the time, Kierkegaard's philosophy exerted a strong influence, chiefly through its claim to pose an alternative to Idealism and Hegel's philosophy of history. Yet when Adorno turned his attention to Kierkegaard, watchwords like "anxiety," "inwardness," and "leap"—instructive for existentialist philosophy—were detached from their theological origins and posed, instead, as problems for aesthetics. As the work proceeded—and Kierkegaard's overcoming of Hegel's idealism was revealed to be a mere interiorization—Adorno excitedly remarked in a letter to Berg that he was writing without looking over his shoulder at the faculty who would soon evaluate his work. Receiving favorable reports from Professors Tillich and Horkheimer, as well as Benjamin and Kracauer, the university conferred on Adorno the venia legendi in February 1931. On the very day his revised study was published, 23 March 1933, Hitler seized dictatorial powers.

Several months after qualifying as a lecturer in philosophy, Adorno delivered an inaugural lecture at the Institute for Social Research, an independent organization that had recently appointed Horkheimer as its director and, with the arrival of the literary scholar Leo Löwenthal, social psychologist Erich Fromm, and philosopher Herbert Marcuse, sought to exploit recent theoretical and methodological advances in the social sciences. His lecture "The Actuality of Philosophy" created a scandal. In it Adorno not only deviated from the theoretical program Horkheimer had laid out a year earlier but also challenged philosophy's very capacity for comprehending reality as such: "For the mind," Adorno announced, "is indeed not capable of producing or grasping the totality of the real, but it may be possible to penetrate the detail, to explode in miniature the mass of merely existing reality." In line with Benjamin's The Origin of German Tragic Drama and preliminary sketches of the Arcades Project, Adorno likened philosophical interpretation to experiments that should be conducted "until they arrive at figurations in which the answers are legible, while the questions themselves vanish." Having lost its position as the Queen of the Sciences, philosophy must now radically transform its approach to objects so that it might "construct keys before which reality springs open."

Following Horkheimer's taking up the directorship of the Institute, a new journal, Zeitschrift für Sozialforschung, was produced to publish the research of Institute members both before and after its relocation to the United States. Though Adorno was not an Institute member, the journal published many of his essays, including "The Social Situation of Music" (1932), "On Jazz" (1936), "On the Fetish-Character in Music and the Regression of Listening" (1938), and "Fragments on Wagner" (1938). In his new role as a social theorist, Adorno's philosophical analysis of cultural phenomena heavily relied on the language of historical materialism, as concepts like reification, false consciousness, and ideology began to play an ever more prominent role in his work. At the same time, however, due to the presence of another prominent sociologist at the institute, Karl Mannheim, as well as the methodological problem posed by treating objects—like "musical material"—as ciphers of social contradictions, Adorno was compelled to abandon any notion of "value-free" sociology in favor of a form of ideology critique that held on to an idea of truth. Before his emigration in the autumn of 1934, Adorno began work on a Singspiel based on Mark Twain's The Adventures of Tom Sawyer titled The Treasure of Indian Joe, which he never completed. By the time he fled Hitler's Germany, Adorno had already written over 100 opera or concert reviews and 50 critiques of music composition.

As the Nazi party became the largest party in the Reichstag, Horkheimer's 1932 observation proved typical for his milieu: "Only one thing is certain," he wrote, "the irrationality of society has reached a point where only the gloomiest predictions have any plausibility." In September Adorno's right to teach was revoked. In March, as the swastika was run up the flagpole of the town hall, the Frankfurt criminal police searched the Institute's offices. Adorno's house on Seeheimer Strasse was similarly searched in July, and his application for membership in the Reich Chamber of Literature was denied on the grounds that membership was limited to "persons who belong to the German nation by profound ties of character and blood." As a "non-Aryan," he was informed, "you are unable to feel and appreciate such an obligation." Soon afterward, Adorno was forced into 15 years of exile.

=== Exile: Oxford, New York, Los Angeles ===
After the possibility of transferring his habilitation to the University of Vienna came to nothing, Adorno considered relocating to Britain at his father's suggestion. With the help of the Academic Assistance Council, Adorno registered as an advanced student at Merton College, Oxford, in June 1934. During the next four years at Oxford, Adorno made repeated trips to Germany to see both his parents and Gretel, who was still working in Berlin. Under the direction of Gilbert Ryle, Adorno worked on a dialectical critique of Edmund Husserl's epistemology. By this time, the Institute for Social Research had relocated to New York City and begun making overtures to Adorno. After months of strained relations, Horkheimer and Adorno reestablished their essential theoretical alliance during meetings in Paris. Adorno continued writing on music, publishing "The Form of the Phonograph Record" and "Crisis of Music Criticism" in the Viennese musical journal 23, "On Jazz" in the institute's Zeitschrift, "Farewell to Jazz" in Europäische Revue. But Adorno's attempts to break out of the sociology of music were twice thwarted: neither the study of Mannheim he had been working on for years nor extracts from his study of Husserl were accepted by the Zeitschrift. Impressed by Horkheimer's book of aphorisms, Dawn and Decline, Adorno began working on his own book of aphorisms, which later became Minima Moralia. While at Oxford, Adorno suffered two great losses: his Aunt Agathe died in June 1935, and Berg died in December of the same year. To the end of his life, Adorno never abandoned the hope of completing Berg's unfinished opera Lulu.

At this time, Adorno was in intense correspondence with Walter Benjamin about the latter's Arcades Project. After receiving an invitation from Horkheimer to visit the Institute in New York, Adorno sailed for New York on 9 June 1937 and stayed for two weeks. While he was in New York, Horkheimer's essays "The Latest Attack on Metaphysics" and "Traditional and Critical Theory," which would soon become instructive for the institute's self-understanding, were the subject of intense discussion. Soon after his return to Europe, Gretel moved to Britain, where she and Adorno were married on 8 September 1937. A little over a month later, Horkheimer telegrammed from New York with news of a position Adorno could take with the Princeton Radio Project, then under the directorship of the Austrian sociologist Paul Lazarsfeld. Yet Adorno's work continued with studies of Beethoven and Richard Wagner (published in 1939 as "Fragments on Wagner"), drafts of which he read to Benjamin during their final meeting, in December on the Italian Riviera. According to Benjamin, these drafts were astonishing for "the precision of their materialist deciphering" as well as the way in which "musical facts ... had been made socially transparent in a way that was completely new to me." In his Wagner study, the thesis later to characterize Dialectic of Enlightenment—man's domination of nature—first emerges. Adorno sailed for New York on 16 February 1938. Soon after settling into his new home on Riverside Drive, Adorno met with Lazarsfeld in Newark, New Jersey, to discuss the Project's plans for investigating the impact of broadcast music.

Although he was expected to embed the Project's research within a wider theoretical context, it soon became apparent that the Project was primarily concerned with data collection to be used by administrators for establishing whether groups of listeners could be targeted by broadcasts specifically aimed at them. Expected to make use of devices with which listeners could press a button to indicate whether they liked or disliked a particular piece of music, Adorno bristled with distaste and astonishment: "I reflected that culture was simply the condition that precluded a mentality that tried to measure it." Thus, Adorno suggested using individual interviews to determine listener reactions and, only three months after meeting Lazarsfeld, completed a 160-page memorandum on the Project's topic, "Music in Radio." Adorno was primarily interested in how musical material was affected by its distribution through the medium of radio and thought it imperative to understand how music was affected by its becoming part of daily life. "The meaning of a Beethoven symphony," he wrote, "heard while the listener is walking around or lying in bed is very likely to differ from its effect in a concert hall where people sit as if they were in church."

In essays published by the institute's Zeitschrift, Adorno dealt with the atrophy of musical culture that had become instrumental in accelerating tendencies—toward conformism, trivialization, and standardization—already present in the larger culture. Unsurprisingly, Adorno's studies found little resonance among members of the Project. At the end of 1939, when Lazarsfeld submitted a second application for funding, the musical section of the study was left out. Yet during the two years during which he worked on the Project, Adorno was prolific, publishing "The Radio Symphony," "A Social Critique of Radio Music," and "On Popular Music," texts that, along with the draft memorandum and other unpublished writings, are found in Robert Hullot-Kentor's translation, Current of Music. In light of this situation, Horkheimer soon found a permanent post for Adorno at the Institute.

In addition to helping with the Zeitschrift, Adorno was expected to be the institute's liaison with Benjamin, who soon passed on to New York the study of Charles Baudelaire he hoped would serve as a model of the larger Arcades Project. In correspondence, the two men discussed the difference in their conceptions of the relationship between critique and artworks that had become manifest through Benjamin's "The Work of Art in the Age of its Technical Reproducibility". At around the same time, Adorno and Horkheimer began planning for a joint work on "dialectical logic," which would later become Dialectic of Enlightenment. Alarmed by reports from Europe, where Adorno's parents suffered increasing discrimination and Benjamin was interned in Colombes, they entertained few delusions about their work's practical effects. "In view of what is now threatening to engulf Europe," Horkheimer wrote, "our present work is essentially destined to pass things down through the night that is approaching: a kind of message in a bottle."

As Adorno continued his work in New York with radio talks on music and a lecture on Kierkegaard's doctrine of love, Benjamin fled Paris and attempted to make an illegal border crossing. After learning that his Spanish visa was invalid and fearing deportation back to France, Benjamin took an overdose of morphine tablets. In light of recent events, the Institute set about formulating a theory of antisemitism and fascism. On one side were those who supported Franz Leopold Neumann's thesis, according to which National Socialism was a form of "monopoly capitalism"; on the other were those who supported Friedrich Pollock's "state capitalist theory." Horkheimer's contributions to this debate, in the form of the essays "The Authoritarian State," "The End of Reason," and "The Jews and Europe," served as a foundation for what he and Adorno planned to do in their book on dialectical logic.

In November 1941 Adorno followed Horkheimer to what Thomas Mann called "German California", setting up house in a Pacific Palisades neighborhood of German émigrés that included Bertolt Brecht and Schoenberg. Adorno arrived with a draft of his Philosophy of New Music, a dialectical critique of twelve-tone music that Adorno felt, while writing it, was a departure from the theory of art he had spent the previous decades elaborating. Horkheimer's reaction to the manuscript was wholly positive: "If I have ever in the whole of my life felt enthusiasm about anything, then I did on this occasion," he wrote after reading the manuscript. The two set about completing their joint work, which transformed from a book on dialectical logic to a rewriting of the history of rationality and the Enlightenment. First published in a small mimeographed edition in May 1944 as Philosophical Fragments, the text waited another three years before achieving book form when it was published with its definitive title, Dialectic of Enlightenment, by the Amsterdam publisher Querido Verlag. This "reflection on the destructive aspect of progress" proceeded through the chapters that treated rationality as both the liberation from and further domination of nature, interpretations of both Homer's Odyssey and the Marquis de Sade, and analyses of the culture industry and antisemitism.

With their joint work completed, Adorno and Horkheimer turned their attention to studies on antisemitism and authoritarianism in collaboration with the Nevitt Sanford-led Public Opinion Study Group and the American Jewish Committee. In line with these studies, Adorno produced an analysis of the Californian radio preacher Martin Luther Thomas. Fascist propaganda of this sort, Adorno wrote, "simply takes people for what they are: genuine children of today's standardized mass culture who have been robbed to a great extent of their autonomy and spontaneity." Adorno wrote that fascist propaganda encourages identification with an authoritarian personality characterized by traits such as obedience and extreme aggression.The result of these labors, the 1950 study The Authoritarian Personality, was pioneering in its combination of quantitative and qualitative methods of collecting and evaluating data as well as its development of the F-scale personality test.

After the USA entered the war in 1941, the situation of the émigrés, now classed "enemy aliens", became increasingly restricted. Forbidden from leaving their homes between 8pm and 6am and from going more than five miles from their houses, émigrés like Adorno, who was not naturalized until November 1943, were severely restricted in their movements.

In addition to the aphorisms that conclude Dialectic of Enlightenment, Adorno put together a collection of aphorisms in honor of Horkheimer's 50th birthday that was later published as Minima Moralia: Reflections from Damaged Life. These fragmentary writings, inspired by a renewed reading of Nietzsche, treated issues like emigration, totalitarianism, and individuality, as well as everyday matters such as giving presents, dwelling, and the impossibility of love. In California, Adorno made the acquaintance of Charlie Chaplin and became friends with Fritz Lang and Hanns Eisler, with whom he completed a study of film music in 1944. In this study, the authors pushed for the greater usage of avant-garde music in film, urging that music be used to supplement, not simply accompany, films' visual aspects. Adorno also assisted Thomas Mann with his novel Doktor Faustus after the latter asked for his help. "Would you be willing," Mann wrote, "to think through with me how the work—I mean, Leverkühn's work—might look; how you would do it if you were in league with the Devil?"

At the end of October 1949, Adorno left America for Europe just as The Authoritarian Personality was being published. Before his return, Adorno had reached an agreement with a Tübingen publisher to print an expanded version of Philosophy of New Music and completed two compositions: Four Songs for Voice and Piano by Stefan George, op. 7, and Three Choruses for Female Voices from the Poems of Theodor Däubler, op. 8.

=== Postwar Europe ===
==== Return to Frankfurt University ====
Upon his return, Adorno helped shape the political culture of West Germany. Until his death in 1969, twenty years after his return, Adorno contributed to the intellectual foundations of the Federal Republic as a professor at the University of Frankfurt am Main, critic of the vogue enjoyed by Heideggerian philosophy, partisan of critical sociology, and teacher of music at the Darmstadt International Summer Courses for New Music. Adorno resumed his teaching duties at the university soon after his arrival, with seminars on "Kant's Transcendental Dialectic," aesthetics, Hegel, "Contemporary Problems in the Theory of Knowledge," and "The Concept of Knowledge." Adorno's surprise at his students' passionate interest in intellectual matters did not, however, blind him to continuing problems within Germany: The literary climate was dominated by writers who had remained in Germany during Hitler's rule, the government re-employed people who had been active in the Nazi apparatus, and people were generally loath to own up to their own collaboration or the guilt they thus incurred. Instead, the ruined city of Frankfurt continued as if nothing had happened, holding on to ideas of the true, the beautiful, and the good despite the atrocities, hanging on to a culture that had itself been lost in rubble or killed off in the concentration camps. All the enthusiasm Adorno's students showed for intellectual matters could not erase the suspicion that, in the words of Max Frisch, culture had become an "alibi" for the absence of political consciousness. Yet the foundations for what would come to be known as "The Frankfurt School" were soon laid: Horkheimer resumed his chair in social philosophy, and the Institute for Social Research, rebuilt, became a lightning rod for critical thought.

==== Essays on fascism ====
Starting with his 1947 essay Wagner, Nietzsche and Hitler, Adorno produced a series of influential works to describe psychological fascist traits. One of these works was The Authoritarian Personality (1950), published as a contribution to the Studies in Prejudice performed by multiple research institutes in the US, and consisting of 'qualitative interpretations' that uncovered the authoritarian character of test persons through indirect questions. The books have had a major influence on sociology and remain highly discussed and debated. In 1951 he continued on the topic with his essay Freudian Theory and the Pattern of Fascist Propaganda, in which he said that "Psychological dispositions do not actually cause fascism; rather, fascism defines a psychological area which can be successfully exploited by the forces which promote it for entirely non-psychological reasons of self-interest."

In 1952 Adorno participated in a group experiment, revealing residual National Socialist attitudes among the recently democratized Germans. He then published two influential essays, The Meaning of Working Through the Past (1959) and Education after Auschwitz (1966), in which he argued on the survival of the uneradicated National Socialism in the mindsets and institutions of the post-1945 Germany and that there is still a real risk that it could rise again. Later on, however, Jean Améry—who had been tortured at Auschwitz—would sharply object that Adorno, rather than addressing such political concerns, was exploiting Auschwitz for his metaphysical phantom "absolute negativity" ("absolute Negativität"), using a language intoxicated by itself ("von sich selber bis zur Selbstblendung entzückte Sprache").

Adorno contended that the culture industry, through mass media, especially radio, had contributed to the development of fascism in Germany. In his view, the "authoritarian voice" arises from the intimacy of broadcast and social practices of radio listening. According to Adorno, "The authority of radio becomes greater the more it addresses the listener in his privacy," while "an organized mass of listeners might feel their own strength and even rise to a sort of opposition."

==== Public events ====
In September 1951, Adorno returned to the United States for a six-week visit, during which he attended the opening of the Hacker Psychiatry Foundation in Beverly Hills, met Leo Löwenthal and Herbert Marcuse in New York, and saw his mother for the last time. After stopping in Paris, where he met Daniel-Henry Kahnweiler, Michel Leiris, and René Leibowitz, Adorno delivered a lecture entitled "The Present State of Empirical Social Research in Germany" at a conference on opinion research. Here, he emphasized the importance of data collection and statistical evaluation while asserting that such empirical methods have only an auxiliary function and must lead to the formation of theories that would "raise the harsh facts to the level of consciousness."

With Horkheimer as dean of the Arts Faculty, then rector of the university, responsibilities for the institute's work fell upon Adorno. At the same time, however, Adorno renewed his musical work: with talks at the Kranichsteiner Musikgesellschaft, another in connection with a production of Ernst Krenek's opera Leben des Orest, and a seminar on "Criteria of New Music" at the Fifth International Summer Course for New Music at Kranichstein. Adorno also became increasingly involved with the publishing house of Peter Suhrkamp, inducing the latter to publish Benjamin's Berlin Childhood Around 1900, Kracauer's writings, and a two-volume edition of Benjamin's writings. Adorno's own recently published Minima Moralia was not only well received in the press but also met with great admiration from Thomas Mann, who wrote to Adorno from America in 1952:

I have spent days attached to your book as if by a magnet. Every day brings new fascination ... concentrated nourishment. It is said that the companion star to Sirius, white in colour, is made of such dense material that a cubic inch of it would weigh a tonne here. This is why it has such an extremely powerful gravitational field; in this respect, it is similar to your book.

Yet Adorno was no less moved by other public events: protesting the publication of Heinrich Mann's novel Professor Unrat with its film title, The Blue Angel; declaring his sympathy with those who protested the scandal of big-game hunting; and penning a defense of prostitutes.

==== More essays on mass culture and literature ====
Adorno returned to Santa Monica to survey his prospects at the Hacker Foundation, as he would have forfeited his American citizenship by the middle of 1952 if he had continued to stay outside the country. While there, he wrote a content analysis of newspaper horoscopes (now collected in The Stars Down to Earth) and the essays "Television as Ideology" and "Prologue to Television"; even so, he was pleased when, at the end of ten months, he was enjoined to return as co-director of the Institute.

Back in Frankfurt, he renewed his academic duties and, from 1952 to 1954, completed three essays: "Notes on Kafka," "Valéry Proust Museum," and an essay on Schoenberg following the composer's death, all of which were included in the 1955 essay collection Prisms. In response to the publication of Thomas Mann's The Black Swan, Adorno penned a long letter to the author, who subsequently approved its publication in the literary journal Akzente. A second collection of essays, Notes to Literature, appeared in 1958. After meeting Samuel Beckett while delivering a series of lectures in Paris the same year, Adorno set to work on "Trying to Understand Endgame," which, along with studies of Proust, Valéry, and Balzac, formed the central texts of the 1961 publication of the second volume of his Notes to Literature. Adorno's entrance into literary discussions continued in his June 1963 lecture at the annual conference of the Hölderlin Society. At the Philosophers' Conference of October 1962 in Münster, at which Habermas wrote that Adorno was "A writer among bureaucrats," Adorno presented "Progress."

Although the Zeitschrift was never revived, the Institute nevertheless published a series of important sociological books, including Sociologica (1955), a collection of essays, Gruppenexperiment (1955), Betriebsklima, a study of work satisfaction among workers in Mannesmann, and Soziologische Exkurse, a textbook-like anthology intended as an introductory work about the discipline.

==== Public figure ====
Throughout the fifties and sixties, Adorno became a public figure, not simply through his books and essays but also through his appearances in radio and newspapers. In talks, interviews, and round-table discussions broadcast on Hessen Radio, South-West Radio, and Radio Bremen, Adorno discussed topics as diverse as "The Administered World" (September 1950), "What is the Meaning of 'Working Through the Past?'" (February 1960), and "The Teaching Profession and its Taboos" (August 1965). Additionally, he frequently wrote for Frankfurter Allgemeine, Frankfurter Rundschau, and the weekly Die Zeit.

At the invitation of Wolfgang Steinecke, Adorno took part in the Darmstadt Summer Courses for New Music in Kranichstein from 1951 to 1958. Yet conflicts between the so-called Darmstadt school, which included composers like Pierre Boulez, Karlheinz Stockhausen, Luigi Nono, Bruno Maderna, Karel Goeyvaerts, Luciano Berio, and Gottfried Michael Koenig, soon arose, receiving explicit expression in Adorno's 1954 lecture, "The Aging of the New Music," where he argued that atonality's freedom was being restricted to serialism in much the same way as it was once restricted by twelve-tone technique. With his friend Eduard Steuermann, Adorno feared that music was being sacrificed to stubborn rationalization. During this time, Adorno not only produced a significant series of notes on Beethoven (which was never completed and only published posthumously) but also published Mahler: A Musical Physiognomy in 1960. In his 1961 return to Kranichstein, Adorno called for what he termed "musique informelle," which would possess the ability "really and truly to be what it is, without the ideological pretense of being something else." Or rather, to admit frankly the fact of non-identity and to follow through its logic to the end."

==== Post-war German culture ====
At the same time Adorno struck up relationships with contemporary German-language poets such as Paul Celan and Ingeborg Bachmann. Adorno's 1949 dictum—" To write poetry after Auschwitz is barbaric"—posed the question of what German culture could mean after Auschwitz; his own continual revision of this dictum—in Negative Dialectics, for example, he wrote that "Perennial suffering has as much right to expression as a tortured man has to scream"; while in "Commitment," he wrote in 1962 that the dictum "expresses in negative form the impulse which inspires committed literature"—was part of post-war Germany's struggle with history and culture. Adorno additionally befriended the writer and poet Hans Magnus Enzensberger as well as the film-maker Alexander Kluge.

In 1963, Adorno was elected to the post of chairman of the German Sociological Society, where he presided over two important conferences: in 1964, on "Max Weber and Sociology" and in 1968, on "Late Capitalism or Industrial Society." A debate launched in 1961 by Adorno and Karl Popper, later published as the Positivist Dispute in German Sociology, arose out of disagreements at the 1959 14th German Sociology Conference in Berlin.

Adorno's critique of the dominant climate of post-war Germany was also directed against the pathos that had grown up around Heideggerianism, as practiced by writers like Karl Jaspers and Otto Friedrich Bollnow, and which had subsequently seeped into public discourse. His 1964 publication of The Jargon of Authenticity took aim at the halo such writers had attached to words like "angst," "decision," and "leap." He also disapproved of Ernest Hemingway's works, agreeing with his friend Reinhard Baumgart that Hemingway's idyll of a life of simple pleasures was an unrealistic fantasy. This set him against many in the German literary elite, such as Hemingway's translators Ernst Rowohlt and Annemarie Horschitz-Horst and Adorno's own friend Annemarie Seidel.

After seven years of work, Adorno completed Negative Dialectics in 1966, after which, during the summer semester of 1967 and the winter semester of 1967–68, he offered regular philosophy seminars to discuss the book chapter by chapter. Among the students at these seminars were the Americans Angela Davis and Irving Wohlfarth. One objection, which would soon take on ever greater importance, was that critical thought must adopt the standpoint of the oppressed, to which Adorno replied that negative dialectics was concerned "with the dissolution of standpoint thinking itself."

==== Confrontations with students ====
Student protests of 1968 took place in West Germany during the same period as the publication of Negative Dialectics'. Trends in the media, an educational crisis in the universities, the Shah of Iran's 1967 state visit, German support for the war in Vietnam, and the emergency laws combined to create a highly unstable situation. Like many of his students, Adorno too opposed the emergency laws, as well as the war in Vietnam, which, he said, proved the continued existence of the "world of torture that had begun in Auschwitz." The situation only deteriorated with the police shooting of Benno Ohnesorg at a protest against the Shah's visit. This death, as well as the subsequent acquittal of the responsible officer, were both commented upon in Adorno's lectures. As politicization increased, rifts developed within both the Institute's relationship with its students as well as within the Institute itself.

Soon, Adorno himself would become an object of the students' ire. At the invitation of Péter Szondi, Adorno was invited to the Free University of Berlin to give a lecture on Goethe's Iphigenie in Tauris. After a group of students marched to the lectern, unfurling a banner that read "Berlin's left-wing fascists greet Teddy the Classicist," a number of those present left the lecture in protest after Adorno refused to abandon his talk in favor of discussing his attitude on the current political situation. Adorno shortly thereafter participated in a meeting with the Berlin Sozialistischer Deutscher Studentenbund (SDS) and discussed "Student Unrest" with Szondi on West German Radio. However, as 1968 progressed, Adorno became increasingly critical of the disruptions students experienced in university life. His isolation was only compounded by articles published in the magazine alternative, which, following the lead of Hannah Arendt's articles in Merkur, claimed Adorno had subjected Benjamin to pressure during his years of exile in Berlin and compiled Benjamin's Writings and Letters with a great deal of bias. In response, Benjamin's longtime friend Gershom Scholem, wrote to the editor of Merkur to express his disapproval of the "in part, shameful, not to say disgraceful" remarks by Arendt.

Relations between students and the West German state continued to deteriorate. In spring 1968, a prominent SDS spokesman, Rudi Dutschke, was gunned down in the streets; in response, massive demonstrations took place, directed in particular against the Springer Press, which had led a campaign to vilify the students. An open appeal published in Die Zeit, signed by Adorno, called for an inquiry into the social reasons that gave rise to this assassination attempt as well as an investigation into the Springer Press' manipulation of public opinion. At the same time, however, Adorno protested against disruptions of his own lectures and refused to express his solidarity with their political goals, maintaining instead his autonomy as a theoretician. Adorno rejected the so-called unity of theory and praxis advocated by the students and argued that the students' actions were premised upon a mistaken analysis of the situation. The building of barricades, he wrote to Marcuse, is "ridiculous against those who administer the bomb." Adorno would refer to the radical students as "stormtroopers (Sturmabteilung) in jeans."

In September 1968, Adorno went to Vienna for the publication of Alban Berg: Master of the Smallest Link. Upon his return to Frankfurt, events prevented his concentrating upon the book on aesthetics he wished to write: "Valid student claims and dubious actions," he wrote to Marcuse, "are all so mixed up together that all productive work and even sensible thought are scarcely possible any more." After striking, students threatened to strip the Institute's sociology seminar rooms of their furnishings and equipment, and the police were brought in to close the building.

==== Later years ====
Adorno began writing an introduction to a collection of poetry by Rudolf Borchardt, which was connected with a talk entitled "Charmed Language," delivered in Zürich, followed by a talk on aesthetics in Paris, where he met Beckett again. Beginning in October 1966, Adorno took up work on Aesthetic Theory. In June 1969, he completed Catchwords: Critical Models. During the winter semester of 1968–1969 Adorno was on sabbatical leave from the university and thus able to dedicate himself to the completion of his book of aesthetics.

For the summer semester, Adorno planned a lecture course entitled "An Introduction to Dialectical Thinking," as well as a seminar on the dialectics of subject and object. But at the first lecture, Adorno's attempt to open up the lecture and invite questions whenever they arose degenerated into a disruption from which he quickly fled. After a student wrote on the blackboard, "If Adorno is left in peace, capitalism will never cease," three women students approached the lectern, bared their breasts and scattered flower petals over his head. Yet, Adorno continued to resist blanket condemnations of the protest movement, which would have only strengthened the conservative thesis according to which political irrationalism was the result of Adorno's teaching. After further disruptions to his lectures, Adorno cancelled the lectures for the rest of the seminar, continuing only with his philosophy seminar. In the summer of 1969, weary from these activities, Adorno returned once again to Zermatt, Switzerland, at the foot of Matterhorn to restore his strength. On 6 August, during a vacation in Visp, he died of a heart attack.

== Intellectual influences ==
Like most theorists of the Frankfurt School, Adorno was influenced by the works of Hegel, Marx, and Freud. Their major theories fascinated many left-wing intellectuals in the first half of the 20th century. Lorenz Jäger speaks critically of Adorno's "Achilles' heel" in his political biography: that Adorno placed "almost unlimited trust in finished teachings, in Marxism, psychoanalysis, and the teachings of the Second Viennese School."

=== Hegel ===
Adorno's adoption of Hegelian philosophy can be traced back to his inaugural lecture in 1931, in which he postulated, "only dialectically does philosophical interpretation seem possible to me" (Gesammelte Schriften 1: 338). Hegel rejected the idea of separating methods and content, because thinking is always thinking of something; dialectics for him is "the comprehended movement of the object itself." Like Gerhard Schweppenhäuser, Adorno adopted this claim as his own and based his thinking on one of the Hegelian basic categories, determinate negation, according to which something is not abstractly negated and dissolved into zero but is preserved in a new, richer concept through its opposite.

Adorno understood his Three Studies of Hegel as "preparation of a changed definition of dialectics" and that they stop "where the start should be" (Gesammelte Schriften 5: 249 f.). Adorno dedicated himself to this task in one of his later major works, Negative Dialectics (1966). The title expresses "tradition and rebellion in equal measure." Drawing from Hegelian reason's speculative dialectic, Adorno developed his own "negative" dialectic of the "non-identical".

=== Karl Marx ===
Marx's Critique of Political Economy clearly shaped Adorno's thinking. As described by Jürgen Habermas, Marxist critique is, for Adorno, a "silent orthodoxy, whose categories [are revealed] in Adorno's cultural critique, although their influence is not explicitly named." Marx's influence on Adorno first came by way of György Lukács's History and Class Consciousness (Geschichte und Klassenbewußtsein). From this text, Adorno took the Marxist categories of commodity fetishism and reification. These are closely related to Adorno's concept of trade, which is central to his philosophy, not exclusively restricted to economic theory. Adorno's "exchange society" (Tauschgesellschaft), with its "insatiable and destructive appetite for expansion," is easily decoded as a description of capitalism. Furthermore, the Marxist concept of ideology is central for Adorno.

Class theory, which appears less frequently in Adorno's work, also has its origins in Marxist thinking. Adorno made explicit reference to class in two of his texts: the first, the subchapter "Classes and Strata" (Klassen und Schichten), from his Introduction to the Sociology of Music; the second, an unpublished 1942 essay, "Reflections on Class Theory," published postmortem in his Collected Works.

=== Sigmund Freud ===
Psychoanalysis is a constitutive element of critical theory. Adorno read Sigmund Freud's work early on, although, unlike Horkheimer, he never underwent analysis. He first read Freud while working on his initial (withdrawn) habilitation thesis, The Concept of the Unconscious in the Transcendental Theory of Mind (1927). Adorno said that "the healing of all neuroses is synonymous with the complete understanding of the meaning of their symptoms by the patient." In his essay "On the Relationship between Sociology and Psychology" (1955), he justified the need to "supplement the theory of society with psychology, especially analytically oriented social psychology" in the face of fascism. Adorno emphasized the necessity of researching prevailing psychological drives in order to explain the cohesion of a repressive society acting against fundamental human interests.

Adorno always remained a supporter and defender of Freudian orthodox doctrine, "psychoanalysis in its strict form." From this position, he attacked Erich Fromm and later Karen Horney because of their revisionism. He expressed reservations about sociologized psychoanalysis as well as about its reduction to a therapeutic procedure.

== Philosophy ==
Adorno's work sets out from a central insight he shares with all early 20th-century avant-garde art: the recognition of what is primitive in ourselves and the world itself. Neither Picasso's fascination with African sculpture nor Mondrian's reduction of painting to its most elementary component—the line—is comprehensible outside this concern with primitivism, which Adorno shared with the century's most radical art. At that time, the Western world, beset by world wars, colonialist consolidation, and accelerating commodification, sank into the very barbarism civilization had prided itself in overcoming. According to Adorno, society's self-preservation had become indistinguishable from the socially sanctioned self-sacrifice of "primitive" people, the primitive aspects of the ego, and those primitive, mimetic desires found in imitation and sympathy. Adorno's theory proceeds from an understanding of this primitive quality of reality that seeks to counteract whatever aims either to repress this primitive aspect or to further those systems of domination set in place by this return to barbarism. From this perspective, Adorno's writings on politics, philosophy, music, and literature are a lifelong critique of the ways in which each tries to justify self-mutilation as the necessary price of self-preservation. According to Adorno's translator Robert Hullot-Kentor, the central motive of Adorno's work thus consists in determining "how life could be more than the struggle for self-preservation." In this sense, the principle of self-preservation, Adorno writes in Negative Dialectics, is nothing but "the law of doom thus far obeyed by history." At its most basic, Adorno's thought is motivated by a fundamental critique of this law.

Adorno was chiefly influenced by Max Weber's critique of disenchantment, György Lukács's Hegelian interpretation of Marxism, and Walter Benjamin's philosophy of history. Adorno, along with the other major Frankfurt School theorists, Max Horkheimer and Herbert Marcuse, argued that advanced capitalism had managed to contain or liquidate the forces that would bring about its collapse and that the revolutionary moment, when it would have been possible to transform it into socialism, had passed. As he put it at the beginning of his Negative Dialectics (1966), philosophy is still necessary because the time to realize it has been missed. Adorno argued that capitalism had become more entrenched by attacking the objective basis of revolutionary consciousness and liquidating the individualism that had underpinned critical consciousness. Adorno, as well as Horkheimer, critiqued all forms of positivism as responsible for technocracy and disenchantment and sought to produce a theory that both rejected positivism and avoided reinstating traditional metaphysics. Adorno and Horkheimer have been criticized for over-applying the term "positivism," especially in their interpretations of Ludwig Wittgenstein and Karl Popper as positivists.

=== Music and the culture industry ===
Adorno criticized jazz and popular music, viewing it as part of the culture industry that contributes to the present sustainability of capitalism by rendering it "aesthetically pleasing" and "agreeable."

In his early essays for the Vienna-based journal Anbruch, Adorno claimed that musical progress is proportional to the composer's ability to constructively address the possibilities and limitations contained within what he called the "musical material." For Adorno, twelve-tone serialism constitutes a decisive, historically developed method of composition. The objective validity of composition, according to him, rests with neither the composer's genius nor the work's conformity with prior standards but with the way in which the work coherently expresses the dialectic of the material. In this sense, the contemporary absence of composers of the status of Bach or Beethoven is not the sign of musical regression; instead, new music is to be credited with laying bare aspects of the musical material previously repressed: The musical material's liberation from number, the harmonic series and tonal harmony. Thus, historical progress is achieved only by the composer who "submits to the work and seemingly does not undertake anything active except to follow where it leads." Because historical experience and social relations are embedded within this musical material, it is to the analysis of such material that the critic must turn. In the face of this radical liberation of the musical material, Adorno came to criticize those who, like Stravinsky, withdrew from this freedom by taking recourse to forms of the past as well as those who turned twelve-tone composition into a technique that dictated the rules of composition.

Adorno saw the culture industry as an arena in which critical tendencies or potentialities were eliminated. He argued that the culture industry, which produced and circulated cultural commodities through the mass media, manipulated the population. Popular culture was identified as a reason why people become passive; the easy pleasures available through consumption of popular culture made people docile and content, no matter how terrible their economic circumstances. "Capitalist production so confines them, body and soul, that they fall helpless victims to what is offered them." The differences among cultural goods make them appear different, but they are in fact just variations on the same theme. He wrote that "the same thing is offered to everybody by the standardized production of consumption goods," but the truth is concealed under "the manipulation of taste and the official culture's pretense of individualism." By doing so, the culture industry appeals to every single consumer in a unique and personalized way, all while maintaining minimal costs and effort on their behalf. Consumers purchase the illusion that every commodity or product is tailored to the individual's personal preference by incorporating subtle modifications or inexpensive "add-ons" to keep the consumer returning for new purchases and, therefore, more revenue for the corporation system. Adorno conceptualized this phenomenon as pseudo-individualisation and the always-the-same.

Adorno's analysis allowed for a critique of mass culture from the left that balanced the critique of popular culture from the right. From both perspectives—left and right—the nature of cultural production was felt to be at the root of social and moral problems resulting from the consumption of culture. However, while the critique from the right emphasized moral degeneracy ascribed to sexual and racial influences within popular culture, Adorno located the problem, not with the content, but with the objective realities of the production of mass culture and its effects, for instance, as a form of reverse psychology. Thinkers influenced by Adorno believe that today's society has evolved in a direction foreseen by him, especially in regard to the past (Auschwitz), morals, or the Culture Industry. The latter has become a particularly productive, yet highly contested, term in cultural studies. Many of Adorno's reflections on aesthetics and music have only just begun to be debated. A collection of essays on the subject, many of which had not previously been translated into English, has only recently been collected and published as Essays on Music.

The idea of "negative dialectics," particularly articulated in his book of the same name, shaped Adorno's work in the years leading up to his death. A key notion in the work of the Frankfurt School since Dialectic of Enlightenment had been the idea of thought becoming an instrument of domination that subsumes all objects under the control of the (dominant) subject, especially through the notion of identity (in what he calls "identity thinking"), that is, of identifying as real in nature and society only that which harmonizes or fits with dominant concepts and regarding as unreal or nonexistent everything that does not. Adorno's "negative dialectics" attempted to articulate a non-dominating thought that would recognize its limitations and accept the non-identity and reality of that which could not be subsumed under the subject's concepts. Indeed, Adorno sought to ground the critical bite of his sociological work in his critique of identity, which he took to be a reification in thought of the commodity form or exchange relation that always presumes a false identity between different things. The potential for criticism arises from the gap between the concept and the object, which can never be fully represented by the former. This gap, this non-identity in identity, was the secret to a critique of both material life and conceptual reflection.

Adorno's reputation as a musicologist remains controversial. His sweeping criticisms of jazz and championing of the Second Viennese School in opposition to Stravinsky have caused him to fall out of favor. The distinguished American scholar Richard Taruskin declared Adorno to be "preposterously overrated." The eminent pianist and critic Charles Rosen saw Adorno's book The Philosophy of New Music as "largely a fraudulent presentation, a work of polemic that pretends to be an objective study." Even a fellow Marxist such as the historian and jazz critic Eric Hobsbawm saw Adorno's writings as containing "some of the stupidest pages ever written about jazz." The British philosopher Roger Scruton saw Adorno as producing "reams of turgid nonsense devoted to showing that the American people are just as alienated as Marxism requires them to be, and that their cheerful life-affirming music is a 'fetishized' commodity, expressive of their deep spiritual enslavement to the capitalist machine." Irritation with Adorno's tunnel vision started even while he was alive. He may have championed Schoenberg, but the composer notably failed to return the compliment: "I have never been able to bear the fellow [...] It is disgusting, by the way, how he treats Stravinsky." Another composer, Luciano Berio, said in an interview, "It's not easy to completely refute anything that Adorno writes—he was, after all, one of the most acute, and also one of the most negative, intellects to excavate the creativity of the past 150 years... He forgets that one of the most cunning and interesting aspects of consumer music, the mass media, and indeed of capitalism itself, is their fluidity, their unending capacity for adaptation and assimilation."

On the other hand, the scholar Slavoj Žižek has written a foreword to Adorno's In Search of Wagner, in which Žižek attributes an "emancipatory impulse" to the same book—although Žižek also suggests that fidelity to this impulse demands "a betrayal of the explicit theses of Adorno's Wagner study"

In a 2014 New Yorker article, music critic Alex Ross discussed the continued relevance of Theodor Adorno's work in the digital age, stating, "The pop hegemony is all but complete, its superstars dominating the media and wielding the economic might of tycoons ... Culture appears more monolithic than ever, with a few gigantic corporations—Google, Apple, Facebook, Amazon—presiding over unprecedented monopolies."

Adorno's critique of commercial media capitalism has continued to influence academic discussions. Scholars often reference his work to explore how Western entertainment industries may contribute to the reinforcement of global capitalism and Western cultural dominance. This perspective is reflected in studies that examine the role of transnational media corporations in shaping cultural production. For example, in The US Empire's Culture Industry, Tanner Mirrlees explores how Western commercial entertainment is often maintained by large transnational media corporations, rather than emerging organically from local cultural traditions.

==== The five components of recognition ====
Adorno states that a start to understanding the recognition in respect of any particular song hit may be made by drafting a scheme that divides the experience of recognition into its different components. All the factors people enumerate are interwoven to a degree that would be impossible to separate from one another in reality. Adorno's scheme is directed towards the different objective elements involved in the experience of recognition:

1. Vague remembrance
2. Actual identification
3. Subsumption by label
4. Self-reflection and act of recognition
5. Psychological transfer of recognition-authority to the object

=== Marxist criticisms ===
Adorno posits social totality as an automatic system. According to Horst Müller's Kritik der kritischen Theorie ("Critique of Critical Theory"), this assumption is consistent with Adorno's idea of society as a self-regulating system, from which one must escape (but from which nobody can escape). For him, it was existent but inhuman. Müller argues against the existence of such a system and claims that critical theory provides no practical solution for societal change. He concludes that Jürgen Habermas, in particular, and the Frankfurt School in general, misconstrue Marx.

== Standardization ==
The phenomenon of standardization is "a concept used to characterize the formulaic products of capitalist-driven mass media and mass culture that appeal to the lowest common denominator in pursuit of maximum profit." According to Adorno, we inhabit a media-culture-driven society that has product consumption as one of its main characteristics. Mass media is employed to deliver messages about products and services to consumers in order to convince these individuals to purchase the commodity they are advertising. Standardization consists of the production of large amounts of commodities to then pursue consumers in order to gain the maximum profit possible.

They do this by individualizing products to give the illusion to consumers that they are in fact purchasing a product or service that was specifically designed for them. Adorno highlights the issues created with the construction of popular music, where different samples of music used in the creation of today's chart-topping songs are put together in order to create, recreate, and modify numerous tracks by using the same variety of samples from one song to another. He makes a distinction between "Apologetic music" and "Critical music." Apologetic music is defined as the highly produced and promoted music of the "pop music" industry: music that is composed of variable parts and interchanged to create several different songs. "The social and psychological functions of popular music [are that it] acts like a social cement" "to keep people obedient and subservient to the status quo of existing power structures."

Serious music, according to Adorno, achieves excellence when its whole is greater than the sum of its parts. The example he gives is that of Beethoven's symphonies: "[his] greatness shows itself in the complete subordination of the accidentally private melodic elements to the form as a whole."

Standardization not only refers to the products of the culture industry but also to the consumers as well. Many times every day consumers are bombarded by media advertising. Consumers are pushed and shoved into consuming products and services presented to them by a media system that takes advantage of musical hooks mass-produced via electronic media. The masses have become conditioned by the culture industry, which makes the impact of standardization far more widespread. Not recognizing the impact of social media and commercial advertising, the individual is caught in a situation where conformity is the norm: "During consumption, the masses become characterized by the commodities which they use and exchange among themselves."

Tony Waters and David Philhour have tested Adorno's ideas and used musical intros from pop songs and asked students in the United States, Germany, and Thailand what they recognize. They found that indeed, as Adorno hypothesized, song intro recognition has spread around the world for some specific commercial pop songs. But they also demonstrate that there are still national differences in recognition.

=== Adorno's responses to his critics ===
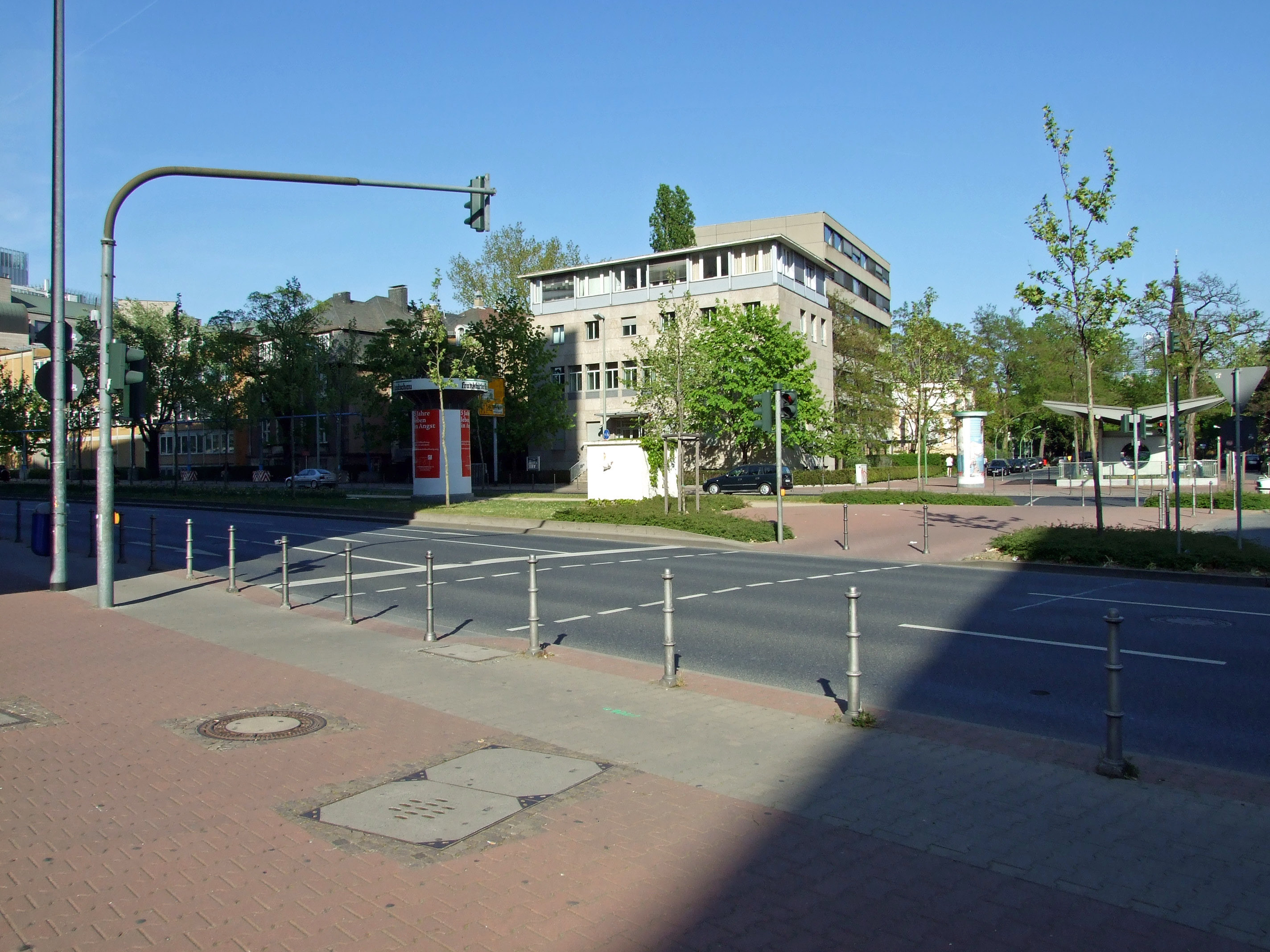
The "Adorno traffic light" on Senckenberganlage, a street which divides the Institute for Social Research from the University of Frankfurt am Main. Adorno requested its construction after a pedestrian death in 1962, and it was finally installed 25 years later.

As a pioneer of a self-reflexive sociology who prefigured Bourdieu's ability to factor in the effect of reflection on the societal object, Adorno realized that some criticism (including deliberate disruption of his classes in the 1960s) could never be answered in a dialogue between equals if, as he seems to have believed, what the naïve ethnographer or sociologist thinks of a human essence is always changing over time.

== Adorno's sociological methods ==
Adorno believed that the language the sociologist uses, like the language of the ordinary person, is a political construct in large measure that uses, often unreflectingly, concepts installed by dominant classes and social structures. He felt that "those at the top of the Institute needed to be the source primarily of theories for evaluation and... empirical testing, as well as people who would process the "facts" discovered... including revising theories that were found to be false." For example, in an essay published in Germany on Adorno's return from the US, and reprinted in the Critical Models essays collection, Adorno praised the egalitarianism and openness of US society based on his sojourn in New York and the Los Angeles area between 1935 and 1955: "Characteristic for the life in America [...] is a moment of peacefulness, kindness and generosity."

One example of the clash of intellectual culture and Adorno's methods can be found in Paul Lazarsfeld, the American sociologist for whom Adorno worked in the late 1930s after fleeing Hitler. As Rolf Wiggershaus recounts in The Frankfurt School, Its History, Theories and Political Significance (MIT 1995), Lazarsfeld was the director of a project, funded and inspired by David Sarnoff (the head of RCA), to discover both the sort of music that listeners of radio liked and ways to improve their "taste" so that RCA could profitably air more classical music. Lazarsfeld, however, had trouble both with the prose style of the work Adorno handed in and what Lazarsfeld thought was Adorno's "lack of discipline in... presentation."

Adorno himself provided the following personal anecdote:

What I mean by reified consciousness, I can illustrate—without elaborate philosophical contemplation—most simply with an American experience. Among the frequently changing colleagues which the Princeton Project provided me with, was a young lady. After a few days, she had gained confidence in me, and asked most kindly: "Dr Adorno, would you mind a personal question?". I said, "It depends on the question, but just go ahead", and she went on: "Please tell me: are you an extrovert or an introvert?" It was as if she, as a living being, already thought according to the model of multi-choice questions in questionnaires.

== Adorno translated into English ==
While even German readers can find Adorno's work difficult to understand, an additional problem for English readers is that his German idiom is particularly difficult to translate into English. A similar difficulty of translation is true of Hegel, Heidegger, and a number of other German philosophers and poets. As a result, some early translators tended toward over-literalness.

Recently, Edmund Jephcott and Stanford University Press have published new translations of some of Adorno's lectures and books, including Introduction to Sociology, Problems of Moral Philosophy, his transcribed lectures on Kant's Critique of Pure Reason and Aristotle's "Metaphysics," and a new translation of the Dialectic of Enlightenment.

Professor Henry Pickford, of the University of Colorado at Boulder, has translated many of Adorno's works, such as "The Meaning of Working Through the Past." A new translation has also appeared of Aesthetic Theory and the Philosophy of New Music by Robert Hullot-Kentor from the University of Minnesota Press. Hullot-Kentor is also currently working on a new translation of Negative Dialectics. Adorno's correspondence with Alban Berg, Towards a Theory of Musical Reproduction, and the letters to Adorno's parents have been translated by Wieland Hoban and published by Polity Press. These fresh translations are slightly less literal in their rendering of German sentences and words and are more accessible to English readers.

The Group Experiment, which had been unavailable to English readers, is now available in an accessible translation by Jeffrey K. Olick and Andrew J. Perrin on Harvard University Press, along with introductory material explaining its relation to the rest of Adorno's work and 20th-century public opinion research.

== Works ==
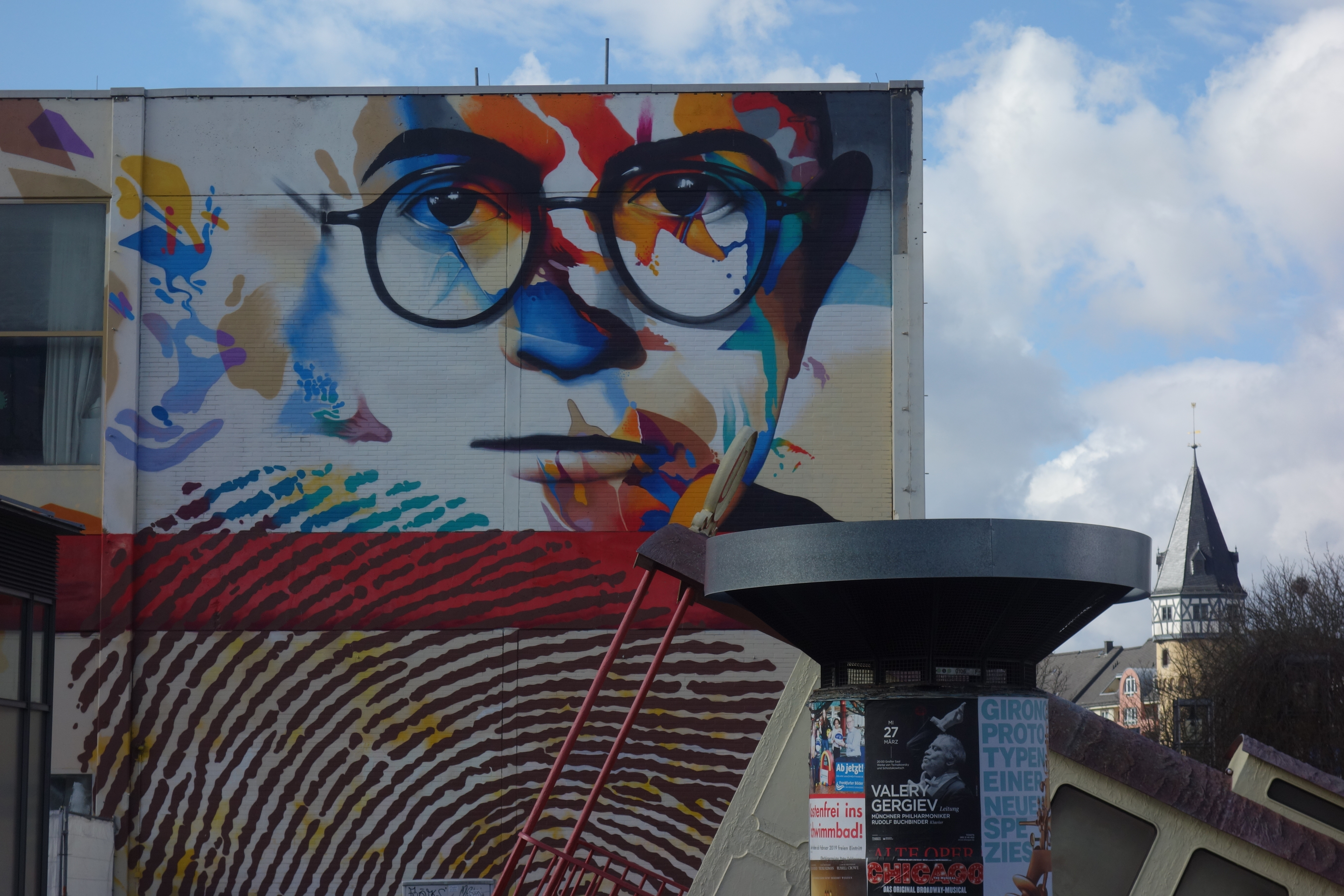
Adorno mural in Frankfurt

=== Books ===
- Kierkegaard: Construction of the Aesthetic (1933)
- Dialectic of Enlightenment (with Max Horkheimer, 1944)
- Composing for the Films (1947)
- Philosophy of New Music (1949)
- The Authoritarian Personality (1950)
- Minima Moralia: Reflections from Damaged Life (1951)
- In Search of Wagner (1952)
- Prisms (1955)
- Against Epistemology: A Metacritique; Studies in Husserl and the Phenomenological Antinomies (1956)
- Dissonanzen. Musik in der verwalteten Welt (1956)
- Notes to Literature I (1958)
- Sound Figures (1959)
- Mahler: A Musical Physiognomy (1960)
- Notes to Literature II (1961)
- Introduction to the Sociology of Music (1962)
- Hegel: Three Studies (1963)
- Critical Models: Interventions and Catchwords (1963)
- Quasi una Fantasia (1963)
- The Jargon of Authenticity (1964)
- Night Music: Essays on Music 1928–1962 (1964)
- Negative Dialectics (1966)
- Alban Berg: Master of the Smallest Link (1968)
- Critical Models: Interventions and Catchwords (1969)

Posthumously published

- Aesthetic Theory (1970)
- The Stars Down to Earth and Other Essays on the Irrational in Culture (1975)
- Beethoven: The Philosophy of Music; Fragments and Texts (1993)
- The Psychological Technique of Martin Luther Thomas' Radio Addresses (2000)
- Kant's 'Critique of Pure Reason' (2002)
- Current of Music (2006)
- Aspects of the New Right-Wing Extremism (1969 lecture; first published in English, 2020)

=== Musical works ===
- Für Sebastian Wedler (1919)
- 6 Studies for string quartet (1920)
- Piano piece (1921)
- String quartet (1921)
- 3 stories by Theodor Däubler for female chorus (1923–1945)
- 2 Pieces for string quartet, Op. 2 (1925/26)
- 7 short works for orchestra, Op. 4 (1929)
- 3 Short Pieces for piano (1934)
- 2 songs for voice & orchestra after Mark Twain's "Indian Joe" (1932/33)
- Kinderjahr – Six Piano pieces from op. 68 of Robert Schumann (1941)
- 2 songs with orchestra

== See also ==
- Adorno's Practical Philosophy
- Positivism dispute
- Theodor W. Adorno Award
