= Aesthetic Theory =

Book by Theodor Adorno

- Cover of the German edition
- Author: Theodor W. Adorno
- Original title: Ästhetische Theorie
- Language: German
- Subject: Aesthetics
- Published: 1970
- Publication place: Germany
- Media type: Print

Aesthetic Theory (German: Ästhetische Theorie) is a book by the German philosopher Theodor Adorno, which was culled from drafts written between 1956 and 1969 and ultimately published posthumously in 1970. Although anchored by the philosophical study of art, the book is interdisciplinary and incorporates elements of political philosophy, sociology, metaphysics and other philosophical pursuits in keeping with Adorno's boundary-shunning methodology.

Adorno retraces the historical evolution of art into its paradoxical state of "semi-autonomy" within capitalist modernity, considering the socio-political implications of this progression. Some critics have described the work as Adorno's magnum opus and ranked it among the most important pieces on aesthetics published in the 20th century.

== Summary ==
In Aesthetic Theory, Adorno is concerned not only with such standard aesthetic preoccupations as the function of beauty and sublimity in art, but with the relations between art and society. He feels that modern art's freedom from such restrictions as cult and imperial functions that had plagued previous eras of art has led to art's expanded critical capacity and increased formal autonomy. With this expanded autonomy comes art's increased responsibility for societal commentary. However, Adorno does not feel that overtly politicized content is art's greatest critical strength: rather, he champions a more abstracted type of "truth-content" (Wahrheitsgehalt). Unlike Kantian or idealist aesthetics, Adorno's aesthetics locates truth-content in the art object, rather than in the perception of the subject. Such content is, however, affected by art's self-consciousness at the hands of its necessary distance from society, which is perceptible in such instances as the dissonances inherent in modern art. Truth-content is ultimately found in the relation between multiple dialectical interactions that emerge from the artwork's position(s) relative to subject and greater societal tradition, as well as internal dialectics within the work itself. Throughout, Adorno praises dramatist Samuel Beckett, to whom the book was dedicated.

== History ==
Aesthetic Theory was edited by Gretel Adorno (the philosopher's widow) and Rolf Tiedemann from Adorno's working drafts. It was assembled from unfinished manuscripts Adorno had composed between May 4, 1961, and July 16, 1969, mainly between October 25, 1966, and January 24, 1968. A series of revisions were undertaken between September 1968 and July 1969, weeks before his death in August of that year.

== Translation history ==
An initial English translation by Christian Lenhardt in 1984 broke "the original single-paragraph sections into smaller paragraphs". Robert Hullot-Kentor's 1997 translation attempted to reproduce the mostly paragraph-less presentation of the original text. This translation currently acts as the work's standard English version.

== Bibliography ==
- Adorno, Theodor W. Ästhetische Theorie. Ed. Gretel Adorno and Rolf Tiedemann. Frankfurt am Main: Suhrkamp Verlag, 1970.
- ———. Aesthetic Theory. Ed. Gretel Adorno and Rolf Tiedemann. Trans. Christian Lenhardt. London and Boston: Routledge and Kegan Paul, 1984.
- ———. Aesthetic Theory. Ed. Gretel Adorno and Rolf Tiedemann. Trans. Robert Hullot-Kentor. Minneapolis: University of Minnesota Press, 1997.
- ———. Aesthetic Theory. Ed. Gretel Adorno and Rolf Tiedemann. Trans. Robert Hullot-Kentor. London, New York: Continuum, 2004.
