= Disability in the United Kingdom =

Disability in the United Kingdom covers a wide range of conditions and experiences, deeply impacting the lives of millions of people. Defined by the Equality Act 2010 as a physical or mental impairment with a substantial and long-term adverse effect on a person's ability to carry out normal day-to-day activities, it encompasses various aspects of life, including demographics, legislation, healthcare, employment, and culture. Despite numerous advancements in policy and social attitudes, individuals with disabilities often encounter unique challenges and disparities.

== Demographics ==
Disabled population pyramid in 2021 in England and Wales

According to the Family Resources Survey 2018/19, 14.1 million people in the UK reported having a disability, consisting of 8% of the child population, 19% of the working age population, and 45% of the pension age population.

== Legislation and government policy ==
Section6(1) of the Equality Act 2010 defines disability as:

"A person has a disability for the purposes of the Act if he or she has a physical or mental impairment and the impairment has a substantial and long-term adverse effect on his or her ability to carry out normal day-to-day activities."

Under the Disability Discrimination Act (DDA) (1995, extended in 2005), it is unlawful for organisations to discriminate (treat a disabled person less favourably, for reasons related to the person's disability, without justification) in employment; access to goods, facilities, services; managing, buying or renting land or property; education. Businesses must make "reasonable adjustments" to their policies or practices, or physical aspects of their premises, to avoid indirect discrimination.

Since 2010, the Disability Discrimination Act has been replaced with the Equality Act 2010. This act still protects disabled people against discrimination but also encompasses a number of other characteristics including age, gender reassignment, marriage, pregnancy, race, religion, sex and sexual orientation. Despite this law, disabled people are twice as likely to be unemployed as non-disabled people.

The Department for Work and Pension is a government department responsible for promoting disability awareness and among its aims is to increase the understanding of disability and removal of barriers for disabled people in the workplace. According to a news report, a people survey conducted in the UK shows a 23% increase in reported discrimination and harassment in the workplace at The Department for Work and Pension. The survey shows the number of reports for discrimination due to disability was in the majority compared to discrimination due to gender, ethnicity or age. DWP received criticism for the survey results. As a department responsible for tackling discrimination at work, the DWP results may indicate room for improvement from within. A DWP spokesperson said the survey results do not necessarily indicate an increase in the number of reports, but rather reflecting the outcomes of efforts to encourage people to come forward.

Policies and legislation about disability in Northern Ireland differs significantly from the rest of the UK.

=== NHS ===
Medical treatment in the United Kingdom is generally free under the NHS. Social Care is subject to a means test. Some services required by disabled people do not fall clearly into either category, and are subject to local rationing decisions. It has been suggested that the safeguards in respect of waiting times provided by the NHS Constitution for England are often not met.

==== Wigs and trusses ====
Provision of NHS wigs and fabric supports, i.e. spinal or abdominal supports or surgical brassieres supplied through a hospital are covered by the NHS Low Income Scheme.

==== Wheelchairs ====
Wheelchairs both manual and electric are supplied and maintained free of charge for disabled people whose need for such a chair is permanent. The specific criteria of eligibility are decided locally by clinical commissioning groups in England and health boards in Wales. Applicants must be referred by a clinician. Assessment and provision is in the hands of NHS wheelchair services, some of which offer a voucher scheme which permit a disabled person to add their own funds to the value of the chair which they are assessed as needing.

In 2017, there were about 1.2 million wheelchair users in the UK, of whom about two thirds were regular users. According to NHS England there were widespread delays in getting chairs, and about half the users develop a pressure ulcer at some point caused, in part, by ill-fitting or ill-equipped chairs. Proposals to improve the commissioning and provision of wheelchair services were formulated in 2015 with the help of the National Wheelchair Leadership Alliance, set up by Tanni Grey Thompson. The vouchers will be replaced by personal wheelchair budgets, based on an assessment of individual needs and goals. The British Medical Association's annual meeting in 2017 unanimously passed a motion calling for wheelchair users to have "timely access to chairs suitable for their individual conditions". There are particular problems with the supply of electric wheelchairs. In 2017 more than 5,100 children, about 18%, had to wait more than four months from the time of their referral to their chair being delivered. Dame Tanni Grey-Thompson said, "If a child doesn't have the right chair it means they cannot go to school, it means children are harder to handle for parents, it means potentially more respite care."

==== Hearing aids ====
Hearing aids have been targeted for cutbacks in the NHS as pressure grows on budgets. North Staffordshire Clinical commissioning group decided that from October 2015 they would no longer pay for hearing aids for people with mild hearing loss or some people with moderate hearing loss. This will save around £200,000 a year. The decision was accepted by Staffordshire County Council's health scrutiny committee in June 2015. It is expected that the other CCGs in the county will adopt a similar policy. In June 2017 Milton Keynes clinical commissioning group was reported to be considering rationing the supply of hearing aids to one per person, and none for people with mild hearing loss or moderate hearing loss unless they could show they were "suffering a significant negative impact". Central and North West London NHS Foundation Trust, which runs community services in the area, complained that these proposals were "incredibly damaging", contrary to national policy, robust evidence, and professional opinion..."

== Politics ==
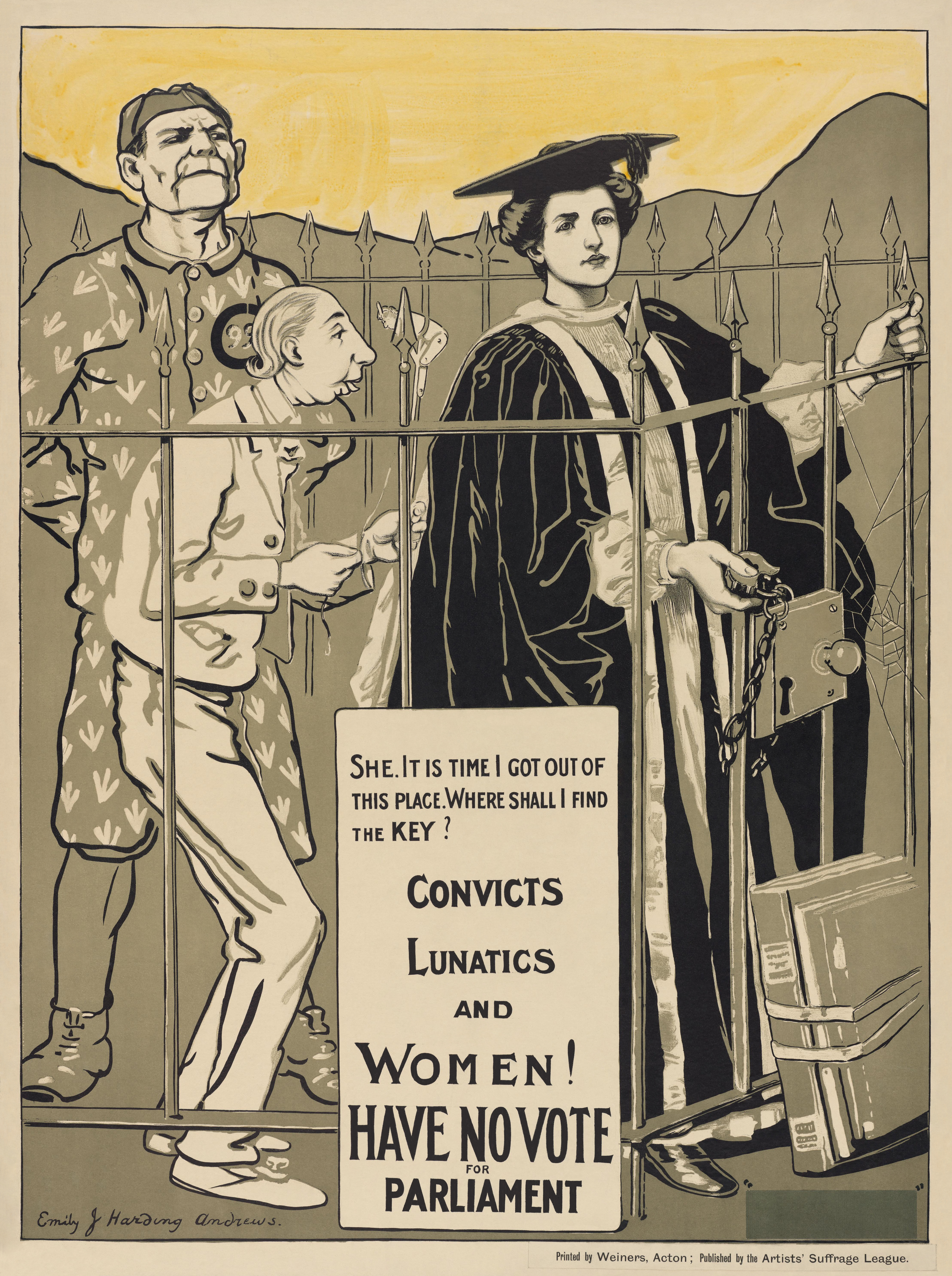
A poster of the British suffrage movement, attacking the fact that women were placed next to "lunatics" and convicts in being unable to vote. Ableist and eugenicist ideas were often found in suffrage rhetoric.

Disability rights has a long and varied history in the UK, ranging from the establishment of the Union of the Physically Impaired Against Segregation in the 1970s to more recent cutbacks of social security benefits and consequent protests. The UK was an early adopter of anti-discrimination legislation in 1995 and ratified the United Nations Convention on the Rights of Persons with Disabilities in 2009. The organised disability rights movement in the UK can trace its roots back to the establishment of the Union of the Physically Impaired Against Segregation in the early 1970s. The organisation's founding principles gave rise to the social model of disability.

Disabled people disputing benefit claims are usually denied legal aid forcing them to deal with complex and distressing cases without help. The numbers disputing when benefits are denied have fallen drastically and it is feared the most vulnerable are losing out.

The treatment of disabled people was an issue in the 2017 United Kingdom general election. The Green Party and Labour Party both produced separate disability manifestos. The Green Party document was launched by their candidate in Putney, Ben Fletcher, who is deafblind.

Reform UK proposed in 2026 that it would abolish Personal Independence Payment and the extra health-related payments on Universal Credit and introduce a new Health Security Allowance for the most "severe, enduring and high-risk cases".

== Disability benefits ==
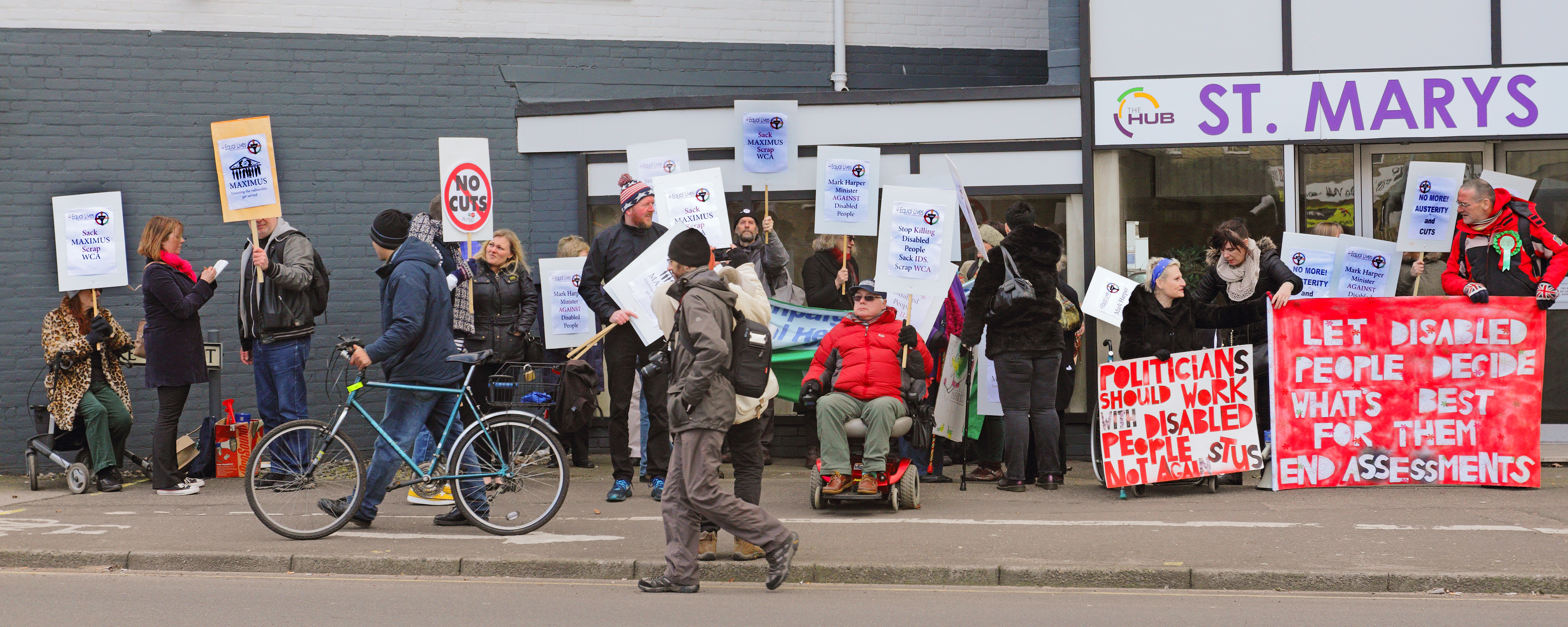
Disabled people protesting in 2015 against government policies and the inaccessibility of the assessment centre which has now been taken over by Maximus outside St Marys House, Norwich.

A number of financial and care support services, commonly referred to as disability benefits are available. Attendance Allowance was introduced by Alf Morris in 1970. The Social Security Contributions and Benefits Act 1992, integrated Mobility Allowance and Attendance Allowance into a new benefit Disability Living Allowance for people under 65. Disability Living Allowance has been replaced, for people over 16, by Personal Independence Payment.

Incapacity Benefit and Income Support have been replaced firstly by Employment Support Allowance and subsequently by Universal Credit which are seen as less generous and more coercive. Social security benefit claimants with disabilities are 53% more likely to have their benefits sanctioned than claimant without disabilities. Disabled people commonly complain about Jobcentre staff not understanding their disability. Mark Atkinson of disability charity Scope said, "Punitive sanctions can be extremely harmful to disabled people, who already face the financial penalty of higher living costs. There is no clear evidence that cutting disabled people's benefits supports them to get into and stay in work. Sanctions are likely to cause unnecessary stress, pushing the very people that the government aims to support into work further away from the jobs market." In 2017 roughly 4,600 disabled claimants had their benefits incorrectly stopped because they did not attend interviews with good reason.

Many UK disabled people cannot afford proper food or cannot afford to keep their homes warm due to benefit cuts. Research by Leonard Cheshire Disability shows struggling families. Also 27% of working age disabled adults have less than £50 spending money per week after paying income tax, council tax and housing costs. 54% of those without social care or with inadequate care feel isolated and lonely. 53% felt lack of help worsened their mental health. The Equality and Human Rights Commission reported disabled people were disproportionately harmed by tax and welfare changes since 2010, and disabled families lost up to £10,000 annually.

== Employment ==
=== Statistics, legislation and policies ===
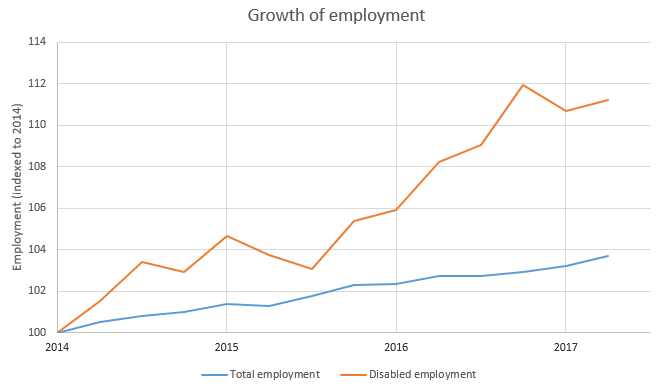
Total UK employment growth measured against disabled employment growth.

The employment rate for disabled people of working age in the UK is 45%, whereas for those without a disability it is 77%. This is in spite of The Equality Act 2010 requiring employers to make reasonable adjustments for a disabled person so they are not at a "substantial disadvantage". However this Act, and previous acts, has had a positive impact, for example, Sainsbury's has recruited over 2,000 disabled people within four years, Marks & Spencer's have taken on over 1,000 disabled people, and BT has provided sustainable opportunities for over 300 disabled people since 2003.

Despite this action, statistics show that 33% of disabled people are employed full-time, compared to 60% of non-disabled people. It is clear from these statistics that disabled people are denied parity of participation in economic terms as less than half the disabled population are employed, and even less again are employed full-time, thus there are significant obstacles in their way to participate fully in the economic sphere. Not all of the UK has adopted The Equality Act 2010, which in turn has led to inconsistency in the UK. Northern Ireland still operate under The Disability Discrimination Act 1995.

While the statistics above show that there was an increase of employment of disabled people within certain companies, this Act has not been as effective as was hoped, as employers were allowed to discriminate against disabled employees, as long as it was justified within the Act. For more consistency and in an effort to promote businesses employing more disabled people Lord Freud claimed that businesses should be able to employ disabled people for below the minimum wage. Freud claims that businesses would be more willing to employ disabled people as they will not be at a loss if disabled people do not perform at the same level as non-disabled people. Freud claims that other countries have similar approaches in place and it is worth looking at the approach different countries have adopted.

=== Creating opportunities for disabled people in the workplace ===
==== Employment ====
Making the workplace more inclusive for all of those who are discriminated against is part of a much wider campaign, and is not merely a matter just for legislation. In regard to disabled people in particular, The Disability Discrimination Act: A Guide for Managers and Employers suggests a number of guidelines for employers to avoid discrimination. These include understanding the social dimension of disabilities, recognising the diverse nature of disabilities, avoid making assumptions, finding out disabled people needs and seeking expert help. This in turn combines fulfilling the legal aspect of avoiding discrimination and changing social attitudes.

The Business Disability Forum (BDF), formerly the Employers' Forum on Disability, is a membership organisation of UK businesses. Following the introduction of the DDA the membership of BDF recognised the need for a tool with which they could measure their performance on disability year on year.

In 2005 eighty organisations took part in the Disability Standard benchmark providing the first statistics highlighting the UK's performance as a nation of employers. Following the success of the first benchmark Disability Standard 2007 saw the introduction of the Chief Executives' Diamond Awards for outstanding performance and 116 organisations taking the opportunity to compare trends across a large group of UK employers and monitor the progress they had made on disability. 2009 saw the introduction of the third benchmark, Disability Standard 2009.

In 2012 the BDF had a number of initiatives to assist businesses in meeting and including the needs of disabled customers and employees. These consisted of The Technology Taskforce (a Business Disability Forum partner initiative which brings together some of the world's largest procurers and suppliers of ICT); Accessible Technology Charter (launched in November 2011) in which the 'Accessibility Maturity Model' (AMM) is a self-assessment tool to enable businesses to identify and plan key policies for accessible and usable technologies.

However, a report by the Social Market Foundation and Trust for London found that disabled people are not being supported into work enough in London. It found that there are 370,000 unemployed disabled Londoners, and a disability employment gap of 38.5%. This is still lower than national average disability employment gap of 41.5%.

==== Self-employment ====
In the UK, self-employment is an option for disabled people. Of those in paid work, 18 per cent of disabled men and 8 per cent of disabled women are self-employed as their main job, compared to 14 per cent and 6 per cent of non-disabled men and women respectively. Research published in 2002 found that many disabled people are not familiar with the rules regarding self-employed work. Self-employment is also sometimes the only option for some disabled people who may require flexible working patterns as a result of their impairment.

== Education ==
Children with a disability that impacts on their education are entitled to support from their school. Children with more complex disabilities may be given an Education and Healthcare Plan (EHCP).

People in higher education with a disability are entitled to apply for Disabled Student's Allowance, which provides funding for equipment and support a student may need for their studies.

== Culture ==
=== Arts ===
The development of disability art began in the 1970s / 80s as a result of the new political activism of the disabled peoples' movement. The exact date the term came into use is currently unverified, although the first use of the term in the Disability Arts Chronology is 1986. During this period the term "disability art" in the disability arts movement has been retrospectively agreed to mean "art made by disabled people which reflects the experience of disability".

As the movement and term developed, the disability arts movement began to expand from what mainly started out as disabled people's cabaret to all art forms. The disability arts movement began to grow year on year and was at its height during the late 1990s. Key exhibitions which looked at disability art happened like Barriers, which was an exhibition considering physical, sensory and intellectual limitation and its effect on personal art practice. (8 Feb - 16 Mar 2007: Aspex Gallery, Portsmouth) and the creation of the Disability Film Festival in London in 1999.

== See also ==
- Accessibility of transport in London
- Changing Places (campaign)
- Deafness in the United Kingdom
- Disability in Northern Ireland
- Disabled Access Day
- Disabled People Against Cuts
- Disabled People's Direct Action Network
- Health in the United Kingdom
- Health inequality in the United Kingdom
- Homelessness in the United Kingdom
- Poverty in the United Kingdom
- Social inequality
- The Access Survey
