= Rethink (disambiguation) =

Rethinking is the process of reviewing a decision or conclusion that has previously been made to determine whether the initial decision should be changed.

Rethink may also refer to:

- Rethink (record label), American record label
- Rethink Communications, Canadian advertising agency
- Rethink Mental Illness, British mental health charity
- Rethink Robotics, American robotics company
- ReThinking, a podcast by Adam Grant

== See also ==
- Think Twice (disambiguation)
- Think (disambiguation)
