= The Access Survey =

Annual survey of disabled people

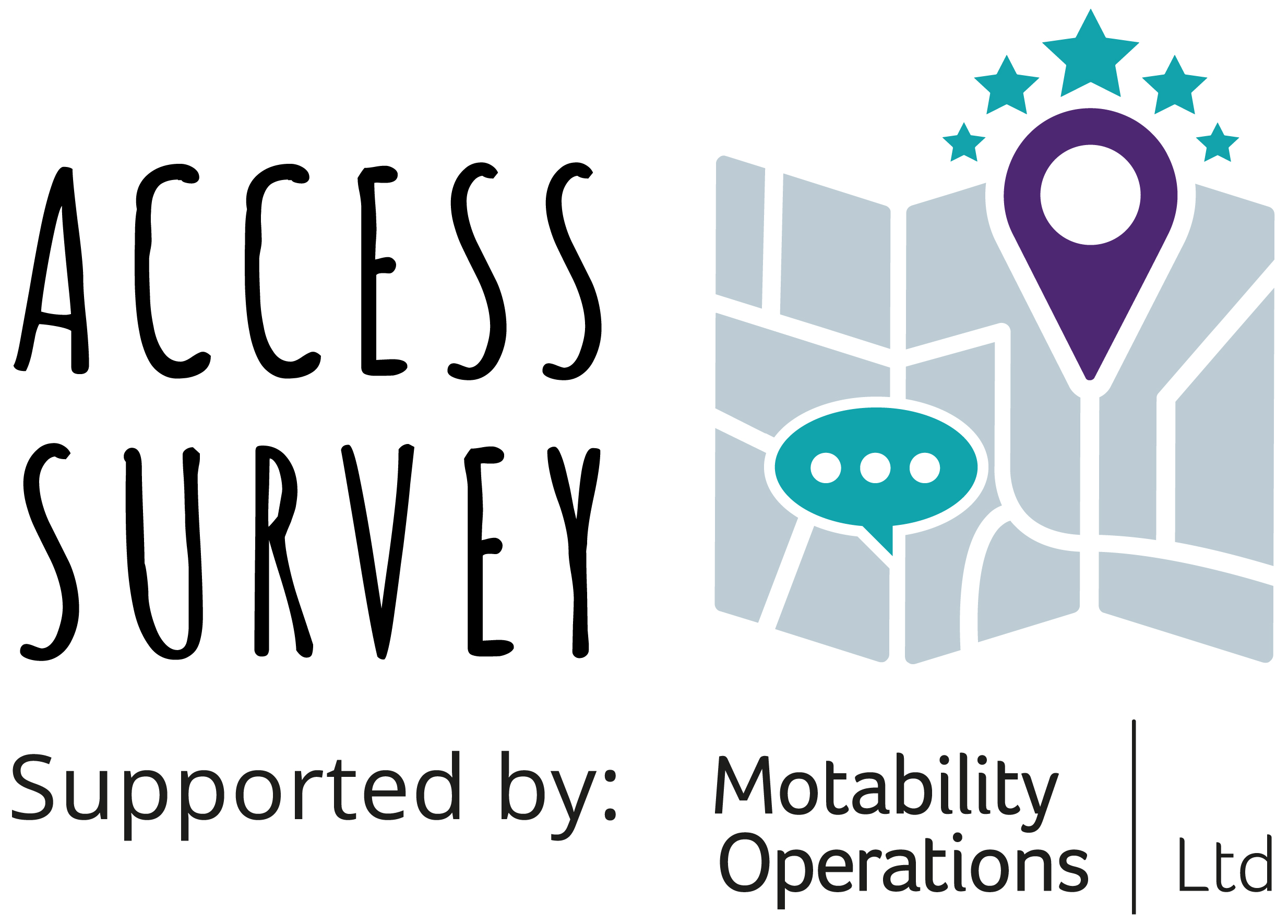
- Frequency: Annually
- Country: United Kingdom
- Years active: 12
- Inaugurated: October 2014; 12 years ago
- Founder: Euan's Guide
- Participants: c.2000/year
- Major events: Survey
- People: Euan MacDonald
- Website: www.euansguide.com/access-survey

The Access Survey is an annual survey of disabled people in the United Kingdom carried out by the disabled access charity Euan's Guide. First conducted in 2014, the Access Survey gathers information on disabled people's experiences and attitudes toward accessibility in the United Kingdom. The results of the Access Survey have been used to shape accessibility policy in the tourism sector.

== History ==
The Access Survey was first carried out in October 2014 and is carried out annually. The survey was designed with the aim of better understanding disabled people's experiences of accessibility. The findings are used by the tourism sector to shape accessibility policy and guides for organisations including public sector bodies VisitScotland and VisitBritain.

The survey also discovers any progress made in terms of accessibility. Since 2014, the Access Survey has consistently asked where disabled people look to find access information when visiting somewhere for the first time and which types of venues deliver the best accessibility.

The Access Survey was postponed in 2020 due to the COVID-19 pandemic, instead Euan's Guide ran a COVID-19 Survey to establish both the concerns of disabled people visiting places and the precautions they hoped venues would take.

The latest Access Survey in 2021 has asked disabled people if accessibility has improved or worsened because of the COVID-19 pandemic. There is also a focus on accessible toilets and how important they are to everyday life.

As of 2021, the survey is being supported by Motability Operations.

== See also ==
- Accessibility
- Disabled Access Day
- Euan MacDonald
