= Disability benefits =

Financial contributions given to people with an illness or with a disability

Disability benefits are a form of financial aid designed to support individuals with long-term illnesses or disabilities. Administered through public welfare systems or private insurance, these funds aim to compensate for lost income and cover additional living costs.

== United Kingdom ==
In the United Kingdom, disability-related benefits are administered by the Department for Work and Pensions. These include programmes such as Personal Independence Payment (PIP), Disability Living Allowance (DLA), and Employment and Support Allowance (ESA), which provide financial support depending on an individual's age and circumstances.

=== Children under 16 ===
- Disability Living Allowance is paid to parents or guardians of children under 16 who have care and/or mobility needs. In the past, it was available to adults aged 65 or under, but claims for DLA for most adults are now being phased out and transferred to PIP.

=== Working-Age Adults (aged 16-66) ===
- Employment and Support Allowance is paid to people who are limited in their capability to work due to their health condition.
- Personal Independence Payment is paid to people who have additional needs in daily life or with mobility.
- Universal Credit can be claimed by both disabled and non-disabled people.

=== Pension Age ===
- Attendance Allowance is paid to people who are in pension age and have daytime and/ or night-time care needs.

=== Industrial Injury Benefits ===
- Constant Attendance Allowance is paid to people who receive Industrial Injuries Disablement Benefit and who are classed as 100% disabled.
- Industrial Injuries Disablement Benefit is paid to people who have become disabled as a result of an illness or injury caused by work or while completing vocational training. To be eligible, the claimant is assessed to ascertain the level of disability they have, as a percentage. The claimant needs to be at least 14% disabled to receive the benefit.
- Reduced Earnings Allowance is paid to people who work but have reduced earnings as a result of accident or illness caused by their work. It is only available if the accident or illness started before October 1, 1990.

=== Carers ===
- Carer's Allowance is paid to people who care for someone who receives the daily living component of PIP or the higher or middle rate care component of DLA. The carer must spend at least 35 hours a week caring for the person and the carer must not earn more than £196 a week.

=== Veterans ===
- Armed Forces Independence Payment is paid to former members of the armed forces who were left disabled after being injured while in the armed services after 6 April 2005.
- War Disablement Pension is paid to people who became disabled as a result of an injury or illness that occurred or was aggravated as a result of serving for the armed services. The injury must have occurred before 6 April 2005.

== United States ==
In the United States, disability benefits for most Americans are covered and paid for by the Social Security Administration (a government agency). There are two main programs administered by the SSA: Social Security Disability Insurance (SSDI) and Supplemental Security Income (SSI). There is also a specific program for children with disabilities. Five states also provide short-term disability benefits for workers who become temporarily unable to work due to illness or injury: California, Hawaii, New Jersey, New York, and Rhode Island.

SSDI provides benefits to individuals who have worked and paid Social Security taxes. Insurance eligibility is dependent upon Quarters of Coverage (QCs), commonly called "work credits". These are allotted based on the earnings for each quarter the individual has worked. Work credits ensure coverage until they "expire" on the individual's Date Last Insured (DLI). Medical evidence must prove that the onset of disability was before their DLI to receive benefits. SSDI recipients become eligible for Medicare after two years of SSDI eligibility.

SSI provides benefits to low-income individuals who are disabled and unable to work, regardless of whether they have worked in the past. Individuals must meet income and resource requirements. SSI also provides benefits to children under 18 years old, who are disabled and whose parents or guardians have limited income. The monthly SSI payment is calculated based upon the Federal Benefit Rate (FBR), and the individual's income. Most SSI recipients are immediately eligible for Medicaid and Supplemental Nutrition Assistance Program (SNAP), though program requirements vary by state.

Some individuals are eligible for both SSI and SSDI.

== Canada ==
In Canada, there are a variety of public Disability Benefit Programs. The largest programs are the Canada Pension Plan and Quebec Pension Plan disability benefits, and provincial workers' compensation and social assistance programs. Some individuals, in addition, have private disability insurance coverage, purchased either individually, or through an employer. Different programs use different rules to decide whether or not someone is eligible for benefits.

=== Canada Pension Plan (CPP) / Quebec Pension Plan (QPP) Disability Benefits ===
To access Canada Pension Plan or the Quebec Pension Plan disability benefits, an individual needs to have a disability that is "severe and prolonged", and which prevents them from working on a regular basis. As of 2018, CPP disability benefits are a minimum of $485.20 a month. Individuals who have contributed more to CPP or QPP during their working career receive higher benefits. The average monthly CPP disability benefit was $971.23 in 2018 and the maximum monthly amount was $1,335.83.

People receiving CPP disability benefits may earn up to $5,500 a year without losing their benefits. Benefits stop when an individual has the ability to work regularly, or is no longer disabled. When an individual reaches the age of 65, CPP Disability Benefits are replaced by a Retirement Pension.

=== Employment Insurance Sickness Benefit (EI Insurance) ===
Employment Insurance is a benefit plan that offers temporary financial assistance to those individuals who cannot work due to sickness, injury, or quarantine.

To be eligible to receive EI sickness benefits:

- The individual's earnings have been reduced by at least 60%
- He/She is employed in insurable employment
- A minimum of 600 hours has been accumulated in the qualifying period

People are only eligible for these benefits if they are unable to work due to their sickness, injury, or quarantine, but would be able to work otherwise. To receive EI sickness benefit a medical certificate signed by the doctor is required.

To qualify for EI you must have a required amount of insurable employment hours, which are used to calculate your benefit period, these insurable employment hours must be accumulated throughout the qualifying period.

The qualifying period:

- 52 week period before the EI claim date
- Start date of previous EI benefit period to the start of the new date

Each individual's case is different, and requirements may vary from case to case. But a general way of calculating EI benefits is 55% of the average insurable weekly earnings. The maximum amount you can be eligible for as of January 1, 2018 is $51,700. Typically EI sickness benefits can only be paid for up to 15 weeks, but can vary depending on how long the individual is unable to work.

Weekly EI sick benefits are calculated based on income before it has been deducted during the individuals "best weeks". Best weeks are the weeks in which the individual earned the most amount, including any tips and commissions, the best weeks are chosen out of the qualifying period.

In Canada, areas with high rates of unemployment will use the best 14 weeks, and in areas with low unemployment rates will use the best 35 weeks.

== Brazil ==
In Brazil, disability benefits are primarily administered by the National Institute of Social Security (INSS). The system distinguishes between temporary and permanent incapacity for contributing workers. The Temporary Incapacity Benefit (Auxílio por Incapacidade Temporária, formerly auxílio-doença) is paid to workers who are temporarily unable to work due to health reasons for more than 15 consecutive days. If the incapacity is deemed permanent and rehabilitation is not possible, the worker may be eligible for Permanent Incapacity Retirement (Aposentadoria por Incapacidade Permanente, formerly aposentadoria por invalidez).

For low-income individuals with disabilities who have not contributed to social security, the government provides the Continuous Cash Benefit (Benefício de Prestação Continuada - BPC). This social assistance program guarantees a monthly minimum wage to people with disabilities who prove they lack the means to support themselves or be supported by their family.

== Portugal ==
In Portugal, the Social Security system (Segurança Social) manages benefits aimed at protecting citizens in situations of illness and disability. The Sickness Allowance (Subsídio de Doença) compensates for lost income during a temporary inability to work. For long-term conditions, the Invalidity Pension (Pensão de Invalidez) is granted to workers who have a permanent reduction in their capacity to work, categorized as either relative or absolute invalidity depending on the severity.

In 2017, Portugal introduced the Social Benefit for Inclusion (Prestação Social para a Inclusão - PSI), a benefit designed to improve the social protection of people with disabilities. Unlike the invalidity pension, the PSI is not strictly tied to a work history but focuses on compensating for the additional costs associated with living with a disability.
