= 2023 Taichung inheritance case =

2023 homicide in Taichung, Taiwan

- Date: May 4, 2023
- Location: Near No. 170, Section 3, Hanxi West Road, Beitun District, Taichung, Taiwan
- Deaths: 1

On 4 May 2023, an 18-year-old Taiwanese high school student surnamed Lai married a 26-year-old man, Hsia Chao-yuan. Two hours after the marriage registration, the student fell to his death in Beitun District, Taichung. Owing to the unclear circumstances surrounding the fall and the complicated background of the deceased's family, as well as the fact that the student had just inherited real estate valued at approximately NT$500 million (with some estimates placing the value at over NT$1.2 billion), the case attracted widespread public attention and discussion after being reported by the media.

== Case overview ==
The grandfather of the Lai family high school student entrusted a scrivener surnamed Hsia with transferring land to the student by way of gift.

At around 7:00 a.m. on 4 May 2023, Hsia Chao-yuan, the son of the scrivener, met with the 18-year-old student. They recruited two strangers as witnesses and registered a same-sex marriage at a household registration office. The two then went to Hsia Chao-yuan's apartment on Hanxi West Road Section 3 in Beitun District, Taichung. Two hours later, the student was found lying downstairs and was pronounced dead after being taken to hospital. When he was discovered, his skull was intact and there were no obvious bloodstains at the scene. Initial reports to emergency services described the incident as a person collapsing on the street.

== Criminal investigation ==
2023 Taichung inheritance case
- Court: Taiwan High Court, Taichung Branch
- Decided: 28 June 2024
- Cases cited: Taichung District Court, Criminal Judgment Yi-Zi No. 1526 of 2023 Taiwan High Court, Taichung Branch, Criminal Judgment Shang-Yi-Zi No. 691 of 2024

Outcome
- Hsia Chao-yuan convicted of causing a public official to make false entries in official documents and sentenced to 1 year and 6 months' imprisonment. Conviction upheld on appeal.

=== Investigation ===
Forensic pathologist Kao Ta-cheng was commissioned by the family of the deceased to assist in investigating the cause of death. On 2 June, Hsia Chao-yuan was still in possession of 30 property certificates belonging to the deceased. Lai's mother instructed her lawyer to send a certified letter demanding their return within seven days, but Hsia refused, leading her to file a complaint for occupational embezzlement.

On 15 June, Kao stated that the case had turned into a confrontation between the victim's side and prosecutors. He questioned the credibility of Hsia Chao-yuan's account and noted that his own forensic findings conflicted with the prosecution's report.

After the incident, Hsia's father stated that he had been unaware of his son's same-sex marriage registration. Through text messages, he indicated his willingness to cooperate with prosecutors and assist in clarifying the facts. The autopsy report concluded that the cause of death was consistent with death resulting from a fall from a height.

=== Indictment and judgments ===
On 21 June 2023, the Taichung District Prosecutors Office announced the conclusion of its investigation. Owing to a lack of direct evidence of homicide, Hsia Chao-yuan and his father were not prosecutedfor murder. However, the victim's family retained the right to seek reconsideration before the Taichung Branch of the Taiwan High Prosecutors Office.Prosecutors determined that the marriage registration filed by Lai and Hsia had not been intended to establish a marital relationship. They concluded that the two had jointly intended to cause a public official to make a false entry by submitting a marriage registration to an unwitting household registration officer. As a result, incorrect information was entered into the household registration information system, thereby undermining the accuracy of marriage registration administration.Prosecutors therefore brought a criminal charge under Article 214 of the Criminal Code of the Republic of China for causing a public official to make false entries in official documents before the Taichung District Court.

On 28 June, mediation in the civil litigation between the two parties failed after Hsia Chao-yuan did not appear and was represented by two attorneys. On 3 July, the victim's family applied for reconsideration of the decision not to prosecute for murder. On 11 July, the Taichung Branch of the Taiwan High Prosecutors Office confirmed that it had received the case file and had assigned it for review. On 28 July, the High Prosecutors Office ordered further investigation, and the case file was returned on 4 August.After renewed investigation, prosecutors again decided not to prosecute for murder in May 2025. The family sought reconsideration, but on 20 June the Taichung Branch of the Taiwan High Prosecutors Officerejected the request, making the decision not to prosecute for murder final.

On 28 June 2024, the Taichung District Court found that Hsia Chao-yuan and the deceased had jointly committed the offense of causing a public official to make false entries in quasi-official documents and sentenced Hsia to one year and six months' imprisonment, without the possibility of commutation to a fine. The case remained appealable.On 23 January 2025, the appellate court rejected Hsia's appeal and upheld the first-instance judgment, making the conviction final. Hsia Chao-yuan began serving his sentence on 3 February 2025.

== Civil litigation ==
On 18 June 2025, the Taichung District Court ruled in the civil action brought by Lai's mother that the marriage between the deceased and Hsia Chao-yuan had not been entered into with the intention of establishing a permanent marital and family relationship and therefore lacked the substantive intent required for marriage. Accordingly, the court declared the marriage invalid. As neither party appealed, the judgment became final.

Under the current Civil Code, once the spouse's inheritance rights are excluded, the right of succession reverts to Lai's biological mother. However, because Lai's mother had previously been a person from mainland China and her household registration status in Taiwan remains disputed, she would be entitled to inherit only NT$2 million if legally classified as a mainland area resident. Any amount exceeding that limit would pass to the next order of heirs, namely Lai's siblings. The siblings have also initiated separate litigation regarding the estate, and the final distribution of the inheritance remains unresolved.
