= Mobility allowance =

Social security benefit

A mobility allowance is a social security benefit for people who are unable to walk, or have difficulty in walking.

== Ireland ==
A Mobility Allowance was established in 1979 for people between 16 and 66. It is paid monthly at a rate of 208.50 per month. There are in excess of 4,700 recipients of mobility allowance at an annual cost of over 9 million. There is also a Motorised Transport Grant for people with a severe disability who need to purchase or adapt a car where that car is essential to retain employment. The maximum grant is 5,020 payable once in any three year period. More than 300 people receive the grant each year at an estimated cost of 1.3 million. The ombudsman recommended that the age limit be removed and the definition of disability should be broadened to include all those with physical, intellectual, sensory or mental health disabilities.

== Israel ==
The General Disability Pension scheme includes a mobility component for people who have impairments in their legs which limit their mobility.

== Italy ==
There was a mobility component to unemployment benefits in Italy but it was abolished in 2012.

== United Kingdom ==
Invalid vehicles, usually single seat three wheelers, were given to disabled war pensioners from 1921. After 1945 war pensioners assessed at more than 20% disabled could opt for a small car instead, and this option was extended to a few other disabled people from 1964. Mobility allowance payments for people over the age of 5 and under 65 were introduced by the Social Security Pensions Act 1975. To qualify a person had to be unable or virtually unable to walk, or the effort of walking would be seriously dangerous and this condition had to be likely to persist for at least 12 months. This only applied to physical disabilities. Ability to walk was assessed with the claimant using artificial aids if appropriate.

The Motability scheme was launched in 1978. This permitted claimants to exchange their weekly benefit payments for a new leased vehicle.

In 1987 the value of the benefit was £22.10 per week. A higher rate of £24.55 was payable to war pensioners. Benefit stopped at the age of 75.

The Social Security Contributions and Benefits Act 1992, integrated Mobility Allowance with Attendance Allowance into a new benefit, Disability Living Allowance for people under pension age.
