= Euan MacDonald Centre =

Research centre of the University of Edinburgh

Coordinates: 55°55′19″N 3°08′15″W

The Euan MacDonald Centre is a research centre which is part of the University of Edinburgh. The centre was established in 2007 and seeks to improve the lives of patients with motor neurone disease (MND). The centre was part funded by a donation by Euan MacDonald, who was diagnosed with MND in 2003, and his father Donald MacDonald. In addition to conducting research, the centre also offers clinical treatments. Around 130 are diagnosed with MND each year in Scotland alone.

In 2013, the centre announced a new partnership with the J9 Foundation which provides support for people with MND in South Africa. Discoveries by the centre include the finding that Zebrafish are able to produce motor neurones when they repair their spinal cords from injury and abnormalities in the protein TDP-43 result in the death of motor neurone cells.

The Euan MacDonald Centre is currently leading a new UK-wide clinical trial, MND-SMART which aims to find treatments for MND.In 2021, The Euan MacDonald Centre announced a discovery that sheds light on how nerve cells damaged by MND can be repaired.

== MND-SMART ==
The MND-SMART clinical trial has been developed by specialists from across the UK, led by the Euan MacDonald Centre and in collaboration with University College London and the University of Warwick. Financial support has come from private funders and donors to the Euan MacDonald Centre, from MND Scotland, and the My Name'5 Doddie Foundation.

The trial has been designed to test more than one treatment at the same time against a shared placebo group. Initially it will test drugs that are already licensed for use in other conditions, such as Alzheimer's Disease and depression. Ineffective medicines can be dropped and new drugs added after the trial has started. This approach could dramatically reduce the time it takes for effective treatments to be made available.
