= Culture industry =

Commercial mass marketing of culture

"Culture industry" (German: Kulturindustrie) is a term coined by the critical theorists Theodor Adorno (1903–1969) and Max Horkheimer (1895–1973). They proposed that popular culture is akin to a factory producing standardized cultural goods—films, radio programmes, magazines, etc.—that are used to manipulate mass society into passivity. Consumption of the easy pleasures of popular culture, made available by the mass communications media, renders people docile and content, no matter how difficult their economic circumstances are. The inherent danger of the culture industry is the cultivation of false psychological needs that can only be met and satisfied by the products of capitalism; thus Adorno and Horkheimer perceived mass-produced culture as especially dangerous compared to the more technically and intellectually difficult high arts. In contrast, true psychological needs are freedom, creativity, and genuine happiness, which refer to an earlier demarcation of human needs, established by Herbert Marcuse.

== The Frankfurt School ==
Members of The Frankfurt School were much influenced by the dialectical materialism and historical materialism of Karl Marx, as well as the revisitation of the dialectical idealism of Hegel; both events are studied not in isolation, but as part of the process of change. As a group later joined by Jürgen Habermas, they were responsible for the formulation of critical theory. In works such as Dialectic of Enlightenment and Negative Dialectics, Adorno and Horkheimer theorized that the phenomenon of mass culture has a political implication, namely that all the many forms of popular culture are parts of a single culture industry whose purpose is to ensure the continued obedience of the masses to market interests.

== The theory ==
The essay is concerned with the production of cultural content in capitalist societies. It critiques the extortionate nature of cultural economies as well as the apparently inferior products of the system. Horkheimer and Adorno argue that mass-produced entertainment aims, by its very nature, to appeal to vast audiences and therefore both the intellectual stimulation of high art and the basic release of low art. The essay does not suggest that all products of this system are inherently inferior, simply that they have replaced other forms of entertainment without properly fulfilling the important roles played by the now-defunct sources of culture.

Horkheimer and Adorno make consistent comparisons between Fascist Germany and the American film industry. They highlight the presence of mass-produced culture, created and disseminated by exclusive institutions and consumed by a passive, homogenised audience in both systems. This illustrates the logic of domination in post-enlightenment modern society, by monopoly capitalism or the nation state. Horkheimer and Adorno draw attention to the problems associated with a system that 'integrates its consumers from above', arguing that in attempting to realise enlightenment values of reason and order, the holistic power of the individual is undermined.

Adorno contended that culture industry, through mass media especially radio, had contributed to the development of fascism in Germany. In his view, the "authoritarian voice" arises from the intimacy of broadcast and social practices of radio listening. According to Adorno, "The authority of radio becomes greater the more it addresses the listener in his privacy," while "an organized mass of listeners might feel their own strength and even rise to a sort of opposition."

== Influences ==
Adorno and Horkheimer's work was influenced by both the broader socio-political environment in which it was written and by other major theorists. Written in California in the early 1940s in an era which characterized them as two ethnically Jewish, German émigrés, The Culture Industry is influenced by European politics and the war by which the continent was consumed. Simultaneously, the American film industry was characterised by an unprecedented level of studio monopolisation, it was "Hollywood at its most classical, American mass culture at its most Fordist".

Horkheimer and Adorno were influenced heavily by major developers of social, political and economic theory, most notably:

- Karl Marx's theories of alienation and commodity fetishism,
- Max Weber's rationality, which shaped the concept of instrumental reason, and
- Georg Lukacs' concept of the reification of consciousness.

== Elements ==
Anything made by a person is a materialization of their labour and an expression of their intentions. There will also be a use value: the benefit to the consumer will be derived from its utility. Yet, the modern soap operas with their interchangeable plots and formulaic narrative conventions reflect standardized production techniques and the falling value of a mass-produced cultural product.

Normally, only high art criticizes the world outside its boundaries, but access to this form of communication is limited to the elite classes where the risks of introducing social instability are slight. A film like Patton is popular art which intends controversy in a world of social order and unity which, according to Adorno, is regressing into a cultural blandness. To Hegel, order is good a priori, i.e. it does not have to answer to those living under it. Marx's theory of Historical Materialism was teleological, i.e. society follows through a dialectic of unfolding stages from ancient modes of production to feudalism to capitalism to a future communism. But Adorno felt that the culture industry would never permit a sufficient core of challenging material to emerge on to the market that might disturb the status quo.

== Mass culture ==
A center point of the Dialectic of Enlightenment is the topic of "the Enlightenment as Mass Deception." The term "culture industry" is intended to refer to the commercial marketing of culture, the branch of industry that deals specifically with the production of culture that is in contrast to "authentic culture."

Horkheimer and Adorno contend that industrially produced culture robs people of their imagination and takes over their thinking for them. The culture industry delivers the "goods" so that the people then only have left the task of consuming them. Through mass production, everything becomes homogenized and whatever diversity remains is constituted of small trivialities. Everything becomes compressed through a process of the imposition of schemas under the premise that what's best is to mirror physical reality as closely as possible. Psychological drives become stoked to the point where sublimation is no longer possible.

Movies serve as an example. "All films have become similar in their basic form. They are shaped to reflect facts of reality as closely as possible. Even fantasy films, which claim to not reflect such reality, don't really live up to what they claim to be. No matter how unusual they strive to be, the endings are usually easy to predict because of the existence of prior films which followed the same schemas. Also, for example, erotic depictions become so strong and so pronounced that a transformation to other forms is no longer possible."

The aims of the culture industry are—as in every industry—economic in nature.

Authentic culture, however, is not goal-oriented, but is an end in itself. Authentic culture fosters the capacity of human imagination by presenting suggestions and possibilities, but in a different way than the culture industry does since it leaves room for independent thought. Authentic culture does not become channeled into regurgitating reality but goes levels beyond such. Authentic culture is unique and cannot be forced into any pre-formed schemas.

As for discovering the causes of the development of the culture industry, Horkheimer and Adorno contend that it arises from companies' pursuit of the maximization of profit, in the economic sense. However, this cannot be said to be culture, or what culture is supposed to be. It can only be described as being a form of commerce, just like any other kind of commerce.

The culture industry argument is often assumed to be fundamentally pessimistic in nature because its purveyors seem to condemn "mass media" and their consumers. However, for Adorno, the term "culture industry" does not refer to "mass culture", or the culture of the masses of people in terms of something being produced by the masses and conveying the representations of the masses. On the contrary, such involvement of the masses is only apparent, or a type of seeming democratic participation. Adorno contends that what is actually occurring is a type of "defrauding of the masses". Horkheimer and Adorno deliberately chose the term "culture industry" instead of "mass culture" or "mass media". "The culture industry perpetually cheats its consumers of what it perpetually promises." The culture industry even encroaches upon the small distractions of leisure activity: "Amusement has become an extension of labor under late capitalism." Horkheimer and Adorno, above all, in their critical analyses, delve into what they call "the fraying of art" and the "de-artification of art", and discuss how the arts are defused by the culture industry. Works of art have become commodified: Beethoven, Mozart and Wagner are only used in fragmentary forms when included in advertisement. According to Critical Theory, "selling out" is not the decisive factor involved, but rather it's the manner in which art is commodified and how art and culture are changed that is the crucial issue.

"Culture today is infecting everything with sameness." For Adorno and Horkheimer, subversion has become no longer possible.

== Reception ==
Wiggershaus states: "The other side of Adorno's apparently paradoxical definition was ignored: that rational objectivity was still possible for the modern work of art, in any significant sense, only as a product of subjectivity". This would deny Adorno contemporary political significance, arguing that politics in a prosperous society is more concerned with action than with thought. He also notes that the young generation of critical theorists largely ignore Adorno's work which, in part, stems from Adorno's inability to draw practical conclusions from his theories.

Adorno is also accused of a lack of consistency in his claims to be implementing Marxism. Whereas he accepted the classical Marxist analysis of society, showing how one class exercises domination over another, he deviated from Marx in his failure to use dialectics as a method to propose ways to change. Marx's theory depended on the willingness of the working class to overthrow the ruling class, but Adorno and Horkheimer postulated that the culture industry has undermined the revolutionary movement. Adorno's idea that the mass of the people are only objects of the culture industry is linked to his feeling that the time when the working class could be the tool of overthrowing capitalism is over.

The digital age, as music critic Alex Ross observed in New Yorker (2014), has only magnified Adorno's relevance. The success of phenomena like the Harry Potter franchise, as critiqued by Jack Zipes, exemplifies this mass commercialization and corporate hegemony. Zipes contends that culture industry commodities achieve "popularity" precisely through their homogeneity and adherence to formula. The media, he argues, actively molds children's tastes. Postmodern sociologist Jean Baudrillard presented a stark view of the consumer's role. He argued that individuals are relentlessly conditioned to pursue the maximization of pleasure as a social duty – a failure to participate risks rendering one asocial. His core critique held that products of capitalist culture, especially those marketed as rebellious, can only offer an illusion of defiance. True rebellion is impossible because the system producing these commodities remains firmly controlled by the powerful.

Scholarship robustly demonstrates how Western entertainment industries fortify transnational capitalism and cement Western cultural dominance. Consequently, commercial entertainment is less an authentic local expression and more a culture amplified by transnational media conglomerates, leading to an homogenization of cultural identities, eroding diverse traditions in favor of marketable forms. These conglomerates—vast media empires controlling music labels, film studios, streaming platforms, and news outlets—are often answerable primarily to shareholders demanding ever-increasing returns. This shareholder primacy incentivizes cost-cutting and profit maximization at the expense of ethical considerations, including fair artist compensation beyond the top tier, safe working conditions, and sustainable sourcing. The advertising revenue that underpins "free" platforms like YouTube, Instagram, and Spotify, crucial for promoting stars, is generated through sophisticated surveillance and data extraction, commodifying user attention and privacy on an unprecedented scale.

Inspired by Adorno and Horkheimer's work, scholars have also identified new industrial phenomenon. This includes "prolonged adaptation," meaning the practice of repeatedly adapting the same film, television and theater content to "inordinately prolong the commercial life" of ideas.

== See also ==
- Cultural and creative industries
- Leisure industry – Sector of the economy dealing with recreation and tourism
- Cultural critic – Professional who reasonably judges the norms and behaviors of a society
- Cultural capital – Concept of social status and social mobility
- Cultural expressions – for copyright implications
- Culture Industry Reconsidered
