= Rethinking =

To review a conclusion previously made

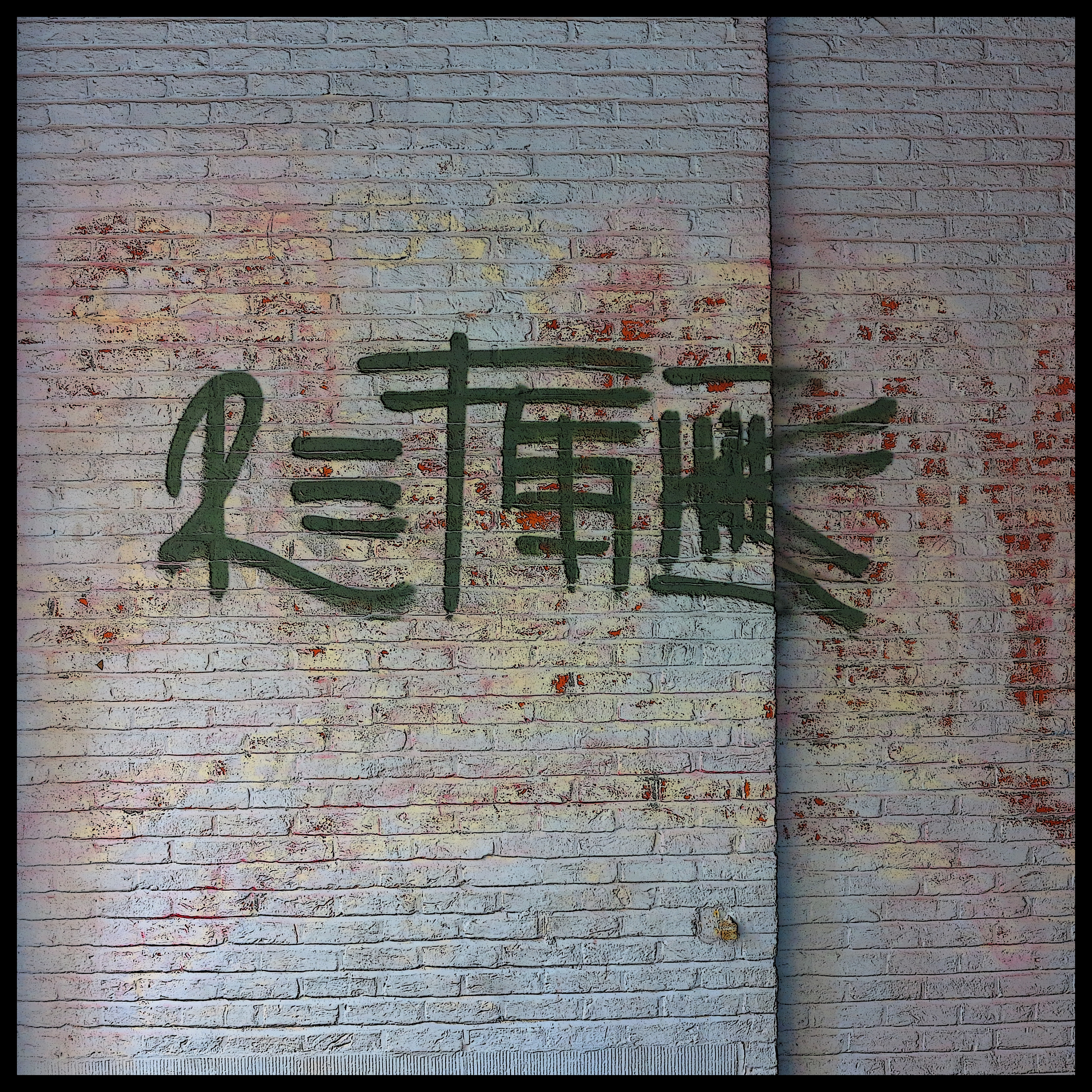
Graffiti in Antwerp combines the English word, "Rethink" with Chinese letter styling.

Rethinking, reconsidering, or reconsideration, is the process of reviewing a decision or conclusion that has previously been made to determine whether the initial decision should be changed. Rethinking can occur immediately after a decision has been reached, or at any time thereafter. Informally, reconsidering a decision shortly after making it and before taking any action towards implementing it may be referred to as thinking twice or thinking again (most often phrased in the imperative, think twice or think again).

== In scholarship and academia ==
In scholarship, arguments favoring new approaches to established ideas are often phrased as "rethinking" of those concepts, or as those concepts "reconsidered", suggesting that a different conclusion would have been reached if more information was available at the time the original concept was developed, or if certain ramifications of the original concept had been more fully thought out at the time of its conception. English professor Mark Bauerlein has described rethinking in academia as a higher form of criticism, stating:

The term "rethinking" magnifies the revision into a profound meditation, an elemental departure from Western thought. That reflects well upon the critic. "Rethinking" grants the thinker a mastery over the material, a sophistication of attitude, an originality of approach. It consigns the past to antiquity and places the critic at the vanguard of thought. The difficulty of the endeavor solicits prudence from critics, but when the practice has become so common that it need not require justification, the elevation of critic into rethinker is a normal and necessary token of status.

Examples of works, social efforts, or entities characterized as "rethinking" include:

- Rethinking Marxism, a journal founded in 1998 by professors and graduate students of the Department of Economics at the University of Massachusetts Amherst, just before the dissolution of the Soviet Union began. The journal quickly became an influential academic platform for Althusserian Marxism in the North American context.
- Rethink Afghanistan, a 2009 documentary by Robert Greenwald and Brave New Films, about the U.S. military presence in Afghanistan following the terrorist attacks of September 11, 2001.
- Rethinking Madness a 2012 book by the psychologist Paris Williams which explores creative ways of dealing with madness (psychosis).
- Rethink Mental Illness, a mental health charity in England originally founded in 1972 as the National Schizophrenia Fellowship, for which the operating name 'Rethink' was adopted in 2002, and expanded to 'Rethink' Mental Illness' (to be more self-explanatory) in 2011.
- Rethink Communications, a Canadian advertising agency.

Some academics have also reexamined prior thought under the rubric of "reconsideration", as with Culture Industry Reconsidered, a 1963 book by German philosopher Theodor W. Adorno, and The American Revolution Reconsidered, a 1996 book by American historian Richard B. Morris.

== In law and policy ==
In law, opportunities to request that certain decision-makers rethink or reconsider their decisions may be required by the rules under which the decision-makers operate. However, rules tend to provide for strict limitations on the timing or other circumstances of such a request. In parliamentary procedure, for example, a matter that was voted on could be brought back again through a "motion to reconsider". Under Robert's Rules of Order Newly Revised (RONR), such a motion must be made within a limited time after the action on the original motion: either on the same day or in the case of a multi-day session (such as a convention), on the next day within the session in which business is conducted.

Many government agencies allow people seeking benefits from those agencies to request reconsideration of the denial of a claim to such a benefit. For example, the United States Copyright Office provides a mechanism for reconsideration of decisions denying copyright registration. A mandatory reconsideration is a feature of the UK social security system by which an individual can challenge a decision that they disagree with for instance the decision not to award a benefit. Child Poverty Action Group state that a mandatory reconsideration is a prerequisite for an individual to appeal to a benefit tribunal. However, the standard of review for requesting reconsideration may be higher than the standard for initially making the claim. In United States Federal Courts, for example, motions for reconsideration are not expressly allowed under the Federal Rules of Civil Procedure (FRCP), but are often allowed by district courts under FRCP Rule 59(e)(3) ("to correct a clear error of law or prevent manifest injustice"), or Rule 60(b) (providing various grounds for relief from a final judgment). However, "reconsideration of a judgment is considered an extraordinary remedy which will be granted only sparingly".
