= Think Twice =

Think Twice may refer to:

== Music ==
- "Think Twice" (Brook Benton song), 1961
- "Think Twice" (Jackie Wilson song), a 1966 duet by Jackie Wilson and LaVern Baker
- "Think Twice" (Celine Dion song), 1994
- "Think Twice", an Eve 6 song from It’s All in Your Head
- "Think Twice", a song by Salvation from Love Is the Song We Sing: San Francisco Nuggets 1965–1970
- "Think Twice", a song by J Dilla from his 2001 album Welcome 2 Detroit
- "Think Twice", a 1974 song by Donald Byrd from Stepping into Tomorrow, covered by many artists
- "Think Twice", chorus lyrics from the 1989 Phil Collins song "Another Day in Paradise"

== Other ==
- Rethinking, reviewing a decision a second time before acting on it
- Think Twice (game show), U.S. game show
- Think Twice, a novel in Rosato & Associates series
- Think Twice, a play by Ayn Rand collected in The Early Ayn Rand
- "Think Twice", the No campaign in the 1997 Scottish devolution referendum
