= Equality Commission for Northern Ireland =

Agency overview
- Formed: 1 March 1999
- Jurisdiction: Northern Ireland
- Headquarters: Equality House, 7-9 Shaftesbury Square, Belfast BT2 7DP
- Employees: 69
- Agency executives: Geraldine McGahey OBE, Chief Commissioner; Neil Anderson, Deputy Chief Commissioner; Louise Conlon, Chief Executive
- Parent department: Executive Office
- Key document: Northern Ireland Act 1998
- Website: https://equalityni.org/

The Equality Commission for Northern Ireland is a non-departmental public body in Northern Ireland established under the Northern Ireland Act 1998. "The Commission is responsible for implementing the legislation on sex discrimination and equal pay, race relations, sexual orientation, age, religious or similar philosophical belief, political opinion and disability. The Commission’s remit also includes overseeing the statutory duties on public authorities to promote equality of opportunity and good relations under Section 75 of the Northern Ireland Act 1998."

== About ==
The commission's vision is "Northern Ireland as a shared, integrated and inclusive place, a society where difference is respected and valued, based on equality and fairness for the entire community".

Its mission is "to advance equality, promote equality of opportunity, encourage good relations and challenge discrimination through promotion, advice and enforcement".

== Responsibilities ==
"The Commission´s duties and functions are set out in the legislation for which we have responsibility. General duties include:

- working towards the elimination of discrimination
- promoting equality of opportunity and encouraging good practice
- promoting affirmative/positive action
- promoting good relations between people of different racial groups
- overseeing the implementation and effectiveness of the statutory duty on public authorities and
- keeping the relevant legislation under review."

On 1 October 1999 the Commission took over the functions previously exercised by the Commission for Racial Equality for Northern Ireland, the Equal Opportunities Commission for Northern Ireland, the Fair Employment Commission and the Northern Ireland Disability Council.

Since 1999, a number of new pieces of legislation have been introduced. The commission is now responsible for promoting awareness of and enforcing anti-discrimination law on the following grounds: age, disability, race, sex (including marital and civil partner status), sexual orientation, religious belief and political opinion.

In 2008, the Commission became part of the UK independent mechanism promoting, protecting and monitoring implementation of the United Nations Convention on the Rights of Persons with Disabilities, alongside the three UK national human rights institutions.

== Leadership ==
Commissioners
Name	Role	Tenure
Geraldine McGahey OBE	Chief Commissioner	2020-present
Neil Anderson	Deputy Chief Commissioner	2020-present
Duane Farrell		2020-present
Helen Ferguson		2020-2023
Carmel McKinney OBE		2020-2024
Jarlath Kearney		2020-2023
Deepa Mann-Kler		2020-2023
Siobhan Cullen		2022-present
Maureen Brunt		2022-present
Ellen Finlay		2022-present
Monica Fitzpatrick MBE		2022-present
Colin Kennedy		2022-present
John McCallister		2022-present
Sheena McKinney		2022-present
Preeti Yellamaty		2022-present
Lisa Caldwell		2023-present
Nazia Latif		2024-present
Stephen Mathews OBE		2023-present
Jim McCooe		2024-present

Evelyn Collins OBE was Chief executive officer. She has spoken about equal opportunity for women in employment in Northern Ireland, and strengthening equality bodies like the Commission across Europe.

== Reactions ==
In July 2009 Peter Robinson, leader of the Democratic Unionist Party criticised the commission for having insufficient Protestant representation. Sinn Féin defended the commission.

== See also ==
- Equality and Human Rights Commission (England, Scotland and Wales)
- Office of the First Minister and deputy First Minister
