= Allan Beard =

British civil servant (1919–2015)

Allan Beard CB, CBE
- Born: Allan Geoffrey Beard; 18 October 1919; Beccles, Suffolk.
- Died: 5 January 2015 (aged 95); Bath, Somerset.
- Occupation: Civil Servant
- Years active: 1979
- Known for: Co-Founding Motability
- Title: CB, CBE
- Spouse: Helen
- Children: 1

Allan Geoffrey Beard CB, CBE (18 October 1919 – 5 January 2015) was a British civil servant, most well known for co-founding Motability. He was awarded the Order of the Bath in 1979 and appointed A CBE in 1994.

He died in Bath in January 2015.
