= Self-employment =

State of working for oneself

Self-employment is the state of working for oneself rather than an employer. Tax authorities will generally view a person as self-employed if the person chooses to be recognised as such or if the person is generating income for which a tax return needs to be filed. In the real world, the critical issue for tax authorities is not whether a person is engaged in business activity (called trading even when referring to the provision of a service) but whether the activity is profitable and therefore potentially taxable. In other words, the trading is likely to be ignored if there is no profit, so occasional and hobby- or enthusiast-based economic activity is generally ignored by tax authorities. Self-employed people are usually classified as a sole proprietor (or sole trader), independent contractor, or as a member of a partnership.

Self-employed people generally find their own work rather than being provided with work by an employer and instead earn income from a profession, a trade, or a business that they operate. In some countries, such as the United States and the United Kingdom, the authorities are placing more emphasis on clarifying whether an individual is self-employed or engaged in disguised employment, in other words pretending to be in a contractual intra-business relationship to hide what is in fact an employer-employee relationship.

2021 self-employment rate by country – OECD
Country	Rate (%)
Colombia	53.1
Brazil	33.3
Mexico	31.8
Greece	31.8
Turkey	30.2
Costa Rica	26.6
South Korea	24.6
Chile	23
Italy	21.8
Poland	19.7
New Zealand	19.7
Czech Republic	15.9
Netherlands	15.8
Spain	15.8
Portugal	15.5
Switzerland	15.3
Finland	14.6
Ireland	14.1
Belgium	14.1
Slovenia	14
Latvia	13
Israel	12.4
France	12.6
Hungary	12.5
Austria	11.9
Lithuania	11.6
Sweden	10.6
Luxembourg	10.2
Japan	9.8
Australia	9.5
Germany	8.8
Denmark	8.8
Canada	7.7
Russia	6.8
United States	6.3
Norway	4.7

== Difference between self-employment, entrepreneurship, and startup ==
Self-employment provides work primarily for the founder of the business. The term entrepreneurship refers to all new businesses, including self-employment and businesses that never intend to grow big or become registered, but the term startup refers to new businesses that intend to provide work and income for more than the founders and intend to have employees and grow large.

In summary:

- self-employment: an organization created with the primary intention to provide work to the founder.
- entrepreneurship: any new organization.
- startup: a temporary new organization created with the intention to get bigger or at least have employees.

== United States ==
Although the common perception is that self-employment is concentrated in a few service sector industries, like salespeople and insurance agents, research by the Small Business Administration has shown that self-employment occurs across a wide segment of the U.S. economy. Furthermore, industries that are not commonly associated as a natural fit for self-employment, such as manufacturing, have in fact been shown to have a large proportion of self-employed individuals and home-based businesses.

In the United States, any person is considered self-employed for tax purposes if that person is running a business as a sole proprietorship, independent contractor, as a member of a partnership, or as a member of a limited liability company that does not elect to be treated as a corporation. In addition to income taxes, these individuals must pay Social Security and Medicare taxes in the form of a SECA (Self-Employment Contributions Act) tax.

In 2016, the median income for individuals self-employed at their own incorporated businesses was $50,347. For individuals self-employed at their own unincorporated firms, this figure was $23,060.

=== Immigrants and ethnic minorities ===
Self-employment is relatively common among new immigrants and ethnic minorities in the United States. In the United States, immigrants tend to have higher rates of self-employment than native-born Americans regardless of race or ethnicity. But, self-employment in the United States is unevenly distributed across racial/ethnic lines. Immigrants and their children who self-identify as White have the highest probability of self-employment in lucrative industries such as professional services and finance. In contrast, racial and ethnic minorities are less likely than native-born Whites to be self-employed, with the exception of Asian immigrants who have high rates of self-employment in low prestige industries such as retail trade and personal services. Much like the regular labor market, self-employment in the United States is stratified across racial lines. In general, self-employment is more common among immigrants than their second-generation children born in the United States. However, the second-generation children of Asian immigrants may continue to seek self-employment in a variety of industries and occupations.

=== Taxation ===
The self-employment tax in the United States is typically set at 15.30%, which is roughly the equivalent of the combined contributions of the employee and employer under the FICA tax. The rate consists of two parts: 12.4% for social security and 2.9% for Medicare. The Social Security portion of the self-employment tax only applies to the first $132,900 of income for the 2019 tax year. There is no limit to the amount that is taxable under the 2.9% Medicare portion of the self-employment tax. In fact, there is an additional Medicare tax rate of 0.9% when a self-employed individual earns above $200,000 (single).

Generally, only 92.35% of the self-employment income is taxable at the above rates. Additionally, half of the self-employment tax, i.e., the employer-equivalent portion, is allowed as a deduction against income.

The 2010 Tax Relief Act reduced the self-employment tax by 2% for self-employment income earned in calendar year 2011, for a total of 13.3%. This rate will continue for income earned in calendar year 2012, due to the Temporary Payroll Tax Cut Continuation Act of 2011. Self-employed persons sometimes declare more deductions than an ordinary employee. Travel, uniforms, computer equipment, cell phones, etc., can be deducted as legitimate business expenses.

Self-employed persons report their business income or loss on Schedule C of IRS Form 1040 and calculate the self-employment tax on Schedule SE of IRS Form 1040. Estimated taxes must be paid quarterly using form 1040-ES if estimated tax liability exceeds $1,000.

=== 401(k) retirement account ===
Self-employed workers cannot contribute to a company-run 401(k) plan of the type with which most people are familiar. However, there are various vehicles available to self-employed individuals to save for retirement. Many set up a Simplified Employee Pension Plan (SEP) IRA, which allows them to contribute up to 25% of their income, up to $54,000 (2017) per year. There is also a vehicle called the Self-Employed 401k (or SE 401(k)) for self-employed people. The contribution limits vary slightly depending on how the business is organized.

A defined-benefit plan is a third option that has high contribution limits and acts like a traditional pension plan. Sole proprietors can also opt for a SIMPLE IRA, which allows them to contribute to employee retirement plans as well as their own retirement plan.

=== Effects on income growth ===
Research has shown that levels of self-employment in the United States are increasing, and that under certain circumstances this can have positive effects on per capita income and job creation. According to a 2017 study by MBO Partners, the self-employed workforce generates $1.2 trillion in revenue for the U.S. economy, which is equal to about 6% of national GDP. A 2011 study from the Federal Reserve Bank of Atlanta and Pennsylvania State University looked at U.S. self-employment levels from 1970 to 2000. According to data from the U.S. Bureau of Economic Analysis, the absolute number of people registered as non-farm proprietors (NFPs) or self-employed in metropolitan counties grew by 244% between 1969 and 2006, and by 93% in non-metropolitan counties. In relative terms, the share of self-employed within the labor force grew from 14% in 1969 to 21% in 2006 in metropolitan counties, and from 11% to 19% in non-metropolitan counties.

In non-metropolitan counties, the study found that increased levels of self-employment were associated with strong increases in per capita income and job creation and significant reductions in family poverty levels. In 1969, the average income of non-farm proprietors was $6,758 compared to $6,507 earned by salaried employees; by 2006 the difference in earnings widened to $12,041 in favor of salaried employees. The study notes that the gap could be due to underreporting of income by the self-employed. Alternatively, low-productivity workers could be losing their jobs and are forced to be self-employed. Further, some research shows that higher local unemployment rates lead workers to self-select into self-employment, as does past unemployment experience.

== European Union ==
The European Commission defines a self-employed person as someone "pursuing a gainful activity for their own account, under the conditions laid down by national law". In the exercise of such an activity, the personal element is of special importance and such exercise always involves a large measure of independence in the accomplishment of the professional activities. This definition comes from Directive 2010/41/EU on the application of the principle of equal treatment between men and women engaged in an activity in a self-employed capacity. This is in contrast to an employee, who is subordinate to and dependent on an employer.

In addition, Article 53 of the Treaty on the Functioning of the European Union (TFEU) provides for the free movement of those taking up and pursuing activities as self-employed people. It stipulates: "In order to make it easier for persons to take up and pursue activities as self-employed persons, the Council shall… issue Directives for the mutual recognition of diplomas, certificates and other evidence of formal qualifications".

The self-employment form of work does not group homogenous workers. As indicated by the European Commission in 2010, there are "different understandings and definitions of the term self-employment across the countries, with a number of different subcategories defined: for instance, according to the legal status of the enterprise, whether the business has employees or not (employers versus own-account workers) and/or the sector in which the business operates. Some countries also make the distinction between self-employed status and the status of 'dependent self-employed' (e.g. Spain, Italy), where the self-employed person works for only one client. Others distinguish self-employment which is carried out in addition to paid employment (e.g. Belgium)".

“Schijnzelfstandigheid” is a Dutch term that refers to false self-employment or bogus self-employment. It occurs when a person is officially classified as a freelancer or self-employed worker but, in practice, works as a regular employee under the same conditions, without the rights or benefits of an employee, such as paid leave, social security, or protection against dismissal.

This situation often arises when employers try to avoid taxes, social security contributions, or labor regulations by hiring workers as independent contractors instead of offering them a formal employment contract. Schijnzelfstandigheid can lead to legal issues, as it is considered an abuse of labor laws designed to protect workers.

In recent years, many countries, including the Netherlands, have tightened regulations to prevent and address this problem, seeking to ensure that workers who should be classified as employees are not wrongly treated as independent contractors.

The European Parliament Resolution on Social Protection for All has stated that: "the absence of a clear national definition of self-employment increases the risk of false self-employment" and the European Parliament Resolution on the Renewed Social Agenda invites Member States to take initiatives that would "lead to a clear distinction between employers, genuine self-employed and small entrepreneurs on the one hand and employees on the other".

Self-employment is mostly regulated at national level only. Each authority and individual body applies its own legal and regulatory framework provisions, which may vary depending on their remit or policy area (tax law, social security, business law, employment market, insurance). The provisions related to self-employment vary therefore widely between the countries. As indicated by the European Foundation for the Improvement of Living and Working Conditions (Eurofound) in 2014, the diversity of the self-employed has attracted diverse forms of regulation, mainly decided at national level: "EU employment law addresses the self-employed mainly in narrowly specific areas such as free movement and equal treatment".

As recommended by the European Forum of Independent Professionals (EFIP), the EU, employers', employees' and self-employment representatives should adopt a Europe-wide joint recognition of genuine self-employment and a common definition that includes a shared terminology for the various sectors.

== United Kingdom ==
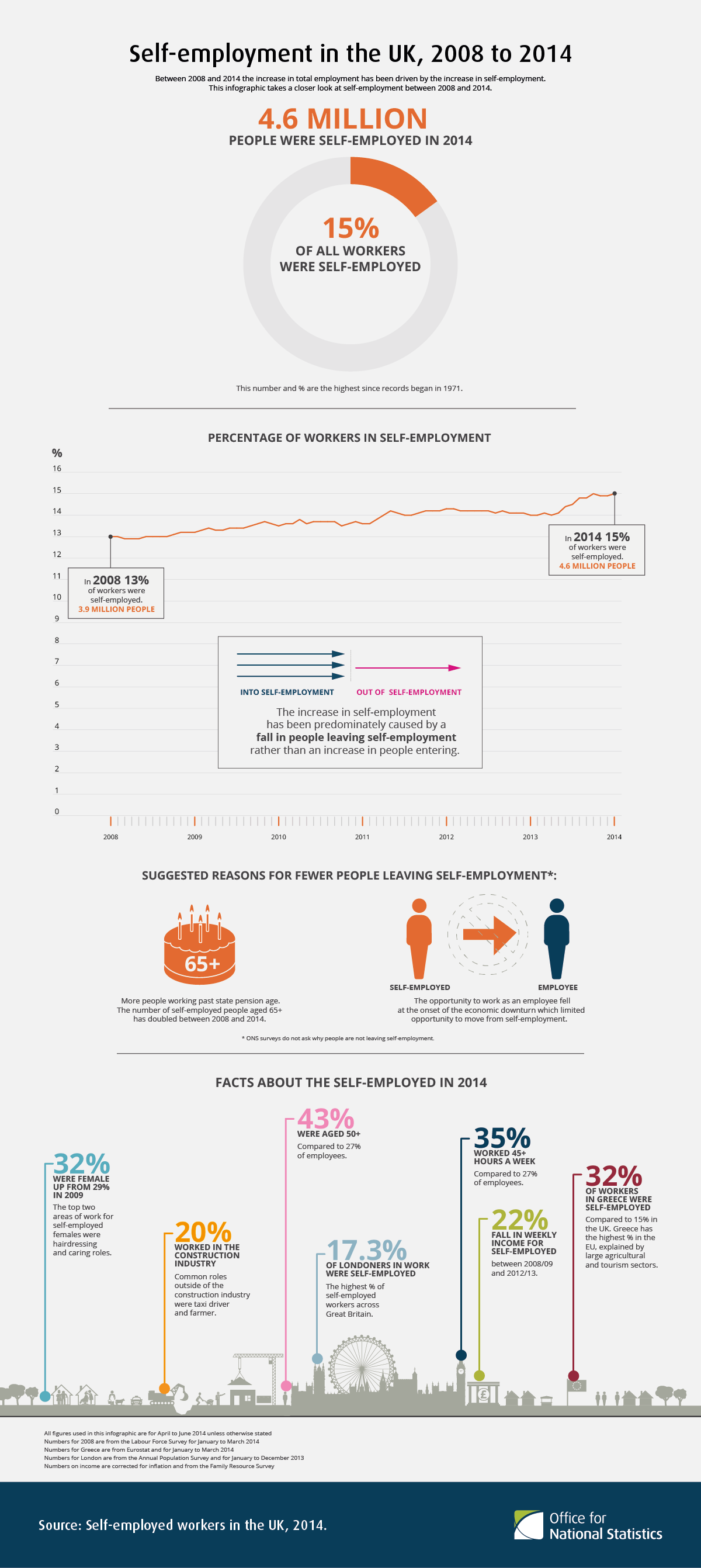
Self-employment in the UK, 2008 to 2014

A self-employed person in the United Kingdom can operate as a sole trader or as a partner in a partnership (including a limited liability partnership or "LLP") but not through an incorporated limited (or unlimited) liability company. It is also possible for someone to form a business that is run only part-time or concurrently while holding down a full-time job.

According to a 2016 study by the McKinsey Global Institute, there are 14 million "independent workers" in the United Kingdom, although the House of Commons Work and Pensions Committee reported in 2017 that 5 million people, 15% of the workforce, were self-employed. The Office for National Statistics referred to a "rapid growth" in self-employment between 2001 (3.3 million people, or 12% of the workforce) and 2017 (4.8 million people, or 15.1% of the workforce, with London, Yorkshire and the Humber and the South East regions exhibiting the greatest rates of increase. Many people living with disabilities choose to be self-employed.

Self-employment, while popular, does come with several legal responsibilities. When remote working, clearance may sometimes be required from the local authority to use part of the home as business premises. If the self-employed person holds records of customers or suppliers in any electronic form they are required to register with the Information Commissioner's Office. Other legal responsibilities include statutory public liability insurance cover, modifying premises to be disabled-friendly, and the proper recording and accounting of financial transactions. Free advice on the range of responsibilities is available from government operated Business Link centres.

The UK government has stated that "self-employment is not the right choice for everyone".

The Office for National Statistics has observed that information on levels of income from self-employment is limited and largely comes from surveys.

The House of Commons Work and Pensions Committee reported in May 2017 that some self-employment could be described as "bogus", noting that "a minority of companies" promote the idea that flexibility in employment can only be secured through self-employment, and that such misuse of self-employment status "passes the burden of safety net support to the welfare state at the same time as reducing tax revenue".

== See also ==
- Convention on the Rights of Persons with Disabilities, Article 27
- Freelancer
- Self-employment for people with disabilities (UK)
- Self-employment visa
- Sole proprietorship
- Remote work
- Workers' self-management
