= Motability =

UK charity

- Formation: 1977; 49 years ago
- Founder: Jeffrey Sterling and Lord Goodman
- Type: Public–private partnership charity
- Registration no.: 299745 (as charity in England and Wales); 736309 (with the FCA)
- Location: United Kingdom
- President: Jeffrey Sterling
- Website: motability.org.uk

Motability Operations Ltd
- Formerly: Motability Finance Ltd
- Founded: 1978; 48 years ago
- Headquarters: London and Bristol
- Area served: United Kingdom
- Key people: Andrew Miller (CEO)
- Services: Operate the Motability Scheme on behalf of Motability
- Revenue: £6.9 billion (2024)
- Number of employees: ~1,700
- Parent: Motability Operations Group PLC, owned by: Barclays; Lloyds Banking Group; HSBC; NatWest Group
- Website: mo.co.uk

Motability is a scheme in the United Kingdom intended to enable disabled people, their families and their carers to lease a new car, scooter or powered wheelchair. It is open to recipients of certain disability benefit, who exchange their weekly payments for a leased vehicle through the scheme. Insurance, vehicle excise duty and breakdown cover are all included, and customers of the scheme are eligible for a new car every three years.

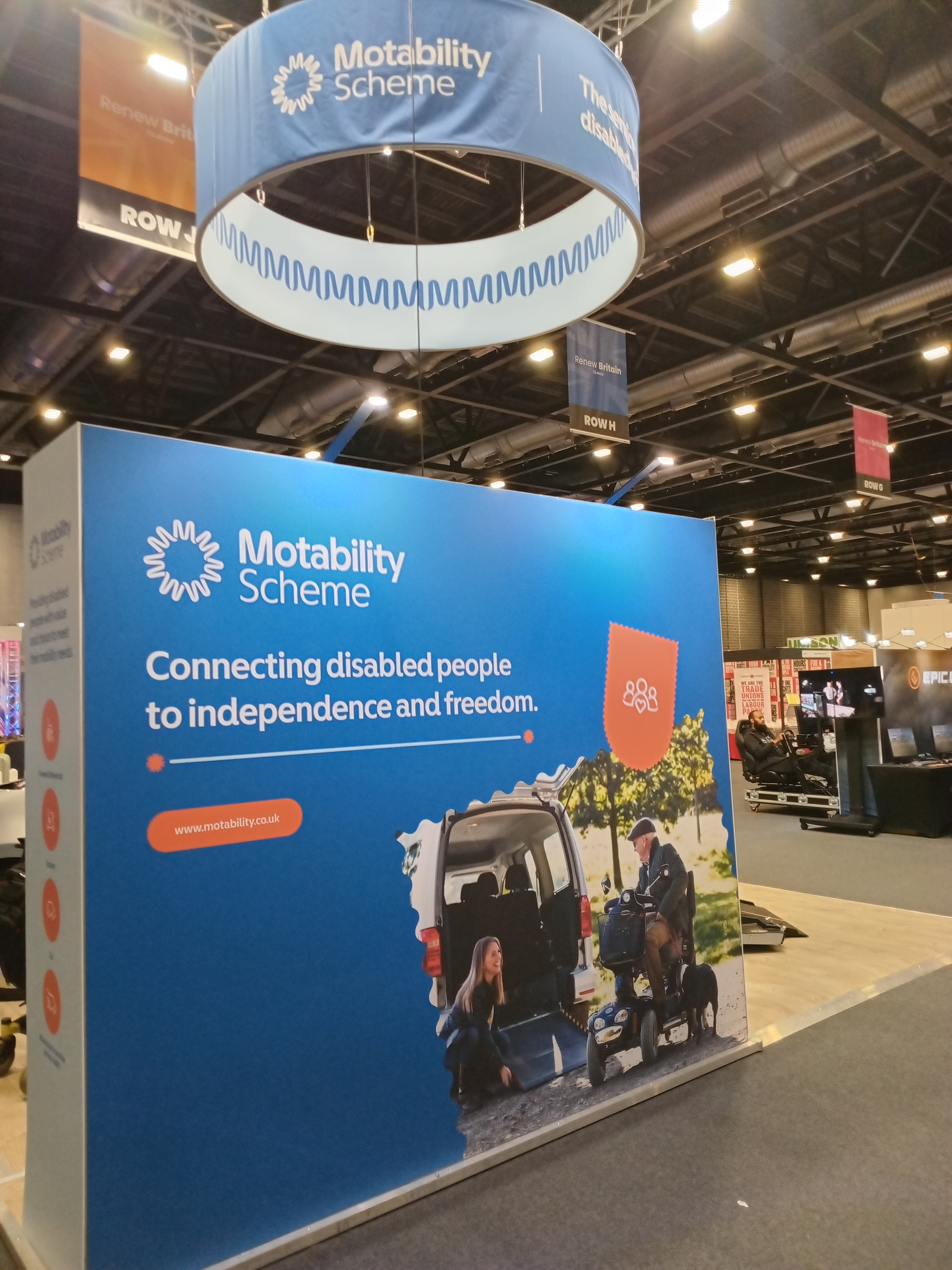
Motability stall at Labour Party Conference 2025

Motability was founded in 1977 by Lord Sterling of Plaistow and the late Lord Goodman. It is a partnership between the charitable sector, the UK government, leading banks, and the motor and insurance industries, managed by a private company called Motability Operations Ltd, and overseen by the Motability Foundation charity. King Charles III became Chief Patron in 2024.

It is the largest fleet operator in Europe. In 2024, the scheme accounted for around 1 in 5 new cars purchased in the UK, with 815,000 people on the scheme, up 15% on the previous year. More than 20 manufacturers currently offer cars through the scheme.

== History and beginnings ==
By the mid-1970s, over 40% of households in the country owned a car but disabled people were underrepresented. Only those who could drive themselves received any government help with transport, usually in the form of a blue trike which was unable to take passengers.

The Mobility Allowance – now called the mobility component of PIP, formerly Disability Living Allowance – introduced by the government in 1976 was formulated to give people help regardless of ability to drive. It also signalled the government's commitment to giving disabled people choice in the form of a cash allowance, rather than imposing certain types of vehicles on them. The War Pensioners' Mobility Supplement pre-dates the Mobility Allowance by a number of years. However, when the government subsequently introduced the Mobility Allowance they set it at a lower weekly rate than the prevailing War Pensioners Mobility Supplement. This difference continues as both are increased annually by the same metric.

It soon became clear that, despite good intentions, the Mobility Allowance was not large enough to buy and run even the smallest car. The then Secretary of State for Health and Social Services invited the late Lord Goodman and (now Lord) Jeffrey Sterling to consider how disabled people could use this allowance to affordably obtain a vehicle.

Thus, Motability was born in 1977 to enable disabled people to afford a good-quality car from any participating manufacturer, fully insured, serviced, and with breakdown assistance. Motability was set up as a charity so it could also raise funds and make grants, in order to provide customers with a complete mobility package even if their allowance would not cover the type of car and adaptations that they needed.

On 25 July 1978, ten young people attended the first Motability Scheme vehicle handover at Earls Court in London and received the keys to their new vehicles from then Chairman Lord Goodman. Julie Newport, disabled by polio, was one of the ten to receive her keys and commented: "I think it's marvellous," saying the Scheme gave disabled people the freedom and independence they really wanted. Also present were Rt Hon Lord Morris, Rt Hon Lord Jenkin, Allan Beard and Jeffrey Sterling, the present Chairman of Motability. Some 220 applications were processed at the beginning of the scheme.

In 2003, Motability celebrated its 25th anniversary with a garden at the Chelsea Flower Show. The garden included a Motability car, an adapted Renault Clio, to symbolize disabled people gaining access to the remotest parts of the countryside.

In October 2006, the Scheme hit the two million vehicles mark and Jeffrey Sterling commented: "Family life revolves around the disabled person so if you make someone mobile you don't help two million, it's more like six to eight million."

In 2018, the National Audit Office praised the customer satisfaction rates for the service, but criticised the profit and reserve levels the charity held. They also criticised its governance and "executive remuneration". A response to a 2019 parliamentary committee to release £343 million of its £2.5bn reserve was greeted as a "first step" to making best use of its "vast sums".

The late Lord Goodman described the establishment of Motability in 1977 as "the most successful achievement of my career and the most fortunate thought that ever came into my head".

== Eligibility and scope ==
The scheme is open to people in receipt of certain disability benefits in the UK:

- the higher rate mobility component of the Disability Living Allowance
- the enhanced mobility component of the Personal Independence Payment
- Scottish Higher rate mobility component of Child or Adult Disability Payment
- an Armed Forces Independence Payment or the War Pensioners' Mobility Supplement.

Claimants wishing to lease through Motability must have at least twelve months' award length remaining when they apply, and other elements of the benefits (e.g. care components) cannot be used to fund a vehicle through the scheme.

Participants in the scheme exchange their mobility allowance to lease a vehicle, with payments being made directly from the responsible government department to Motability Operations. In addition, some more expensive vehicles require an additional non-refundable lump sum called an 'Advance Payment'.

Around two-thirds of Motability's customers drive their own vehicle, but non-drivers can get a car as a passenger. Similarly, parents and caregivers can also apply on behalf of a disabled child from the age of three.

As of 2022, over four million cars have been supplied since the scheme began. In 2024, Motability purchased almost 20% of all new cars sold in the United Kingdom.

== Funding ==
The scheme receives no direct public funding aside beyond the transfers of benefit payments. Up until July 2026, the scheme benefited from significant tax relief, as vehicles are exempt from VAT and Insurance Premium Tax. The National Audit Office valued these exemptions at £888 million in 2017, based on that year's revenue.

In the 2025 Autumn Labour Budget, Rachel Reeves announced financial implications to the scheme, removing the VAT and Insurance Premium Tax (IPT) exemptions. Motability Operations estimated this would cost £300,000,000 per year. This is around £1,100 per lease for scheme customers, forcing changes to the scheme propositions, such as increased advanced payments and reductions in mileage allowance. This followed a period of extreme scrutiny on the scheme.

In addition, means-tested grants are available from the Motability charity for those who, because of the nature of their disability, have no option but to choose a vehicle which attracts an advance payment, or who may need special adaptations not already funded through the scheme.

== Structure ==
The organisational structure of the scheme can be broken into two parts: Motability, which is a registered charity, and Motability Operations (formerly Motability Finance Ltd), a public limited company owned by four clearing banks which operates the car and powered wheelchair leasing scheme on behalf of Motability. Splitting the organisation is intended to provide for checks and balances and ensure accountability for the administration of public funds. Salaries paid to Motability Operations Group PLC management have attracted negative publicity, with former CEO Mike Betts taking home total remuneration of £948,243 in 2016, as reported in Motability Operations Group PLC's accounts. Betts quit in 2018.

Motability is a registered charity and has overall responsibility for the Motability Scheme, including:

- Directing and overseeing the Scheme;
- Raising funds to provide financial assistance through grants to customers who would otherwise be unable to participate in the Scheme;
- Administering the Government's Specialised Vehicles Fund which provides financial assistance for customers who need complex adaptations or to travel in their wheelchairs; and
- Providing technical support to customers and the adaptation and conversion industry.

Motability Operations has the exclusive contract for administering the scheme. According to the charity, any profits are reinvested in the Scheme or donated to the Motability charity. In the financial year ending 30 September 2016, Motability Operations reported post-tax profits of £130m net of a donation to Motability (the charity) of £45m. In 2021, the donation was £170 million. The National Audit Office in 2018 and a parliamentary committee of 2019 challenged how this reinvestment was being used, both in terms of its reserves (over £2.5bn) and executive reward "at near maximum" levels.

Motability Operations also set and monitors the standards of service provided by the dealer network, adaptations suppliers, breakdown company and the insurance company. Motability Operations also negotiates pricing with the vehicle manufacturers on a quarterly basis.

Insurance is provided exclusively by Direct Line Motability (since 1 September 2023) who have a dedicated Motability division. Direct Line require any persons wishing to be one of the three named drivers to have no or possibly some minor endorsements on their driving licence in the last five years. The excess for any claims has recently increased but remains competitive at £250. A third driver is permitted and subject to certain constraints on vehicle choice, additional drivers can include anyone from age 17 upwards (subject to the vehicle's insurance group for drivers under 25 years of age) provided they live with the disabled customer. Drink-driving convictions require five years from conviction date to be eligible for insurance on a Motability car. On 1 September 2023, Direct Line replaced RSA as insurance provider to the Motability scheme.

Motability Operations is owned by four major clearing banks – Barclays, Lloyds Banking Group, HSBC and NatWest Group. Any surpluses are continually reinvested in the business or donated to the Motability charity.

Breakdown cover is provided exclusively by the RAC.

Adaptations are supplied and fitted by independent specialists who are accredited to Motability.

Customers apply via accredited main car dealerships.

The Wheelchair and Scooter Scheme was operated by Route2mobility until June 2010, when it was taken over by Motability Operations.

== Controversy ==
On 7 December 2018 the National Audit Office published its report on Motability which upheld many criticisms of executive pay and reserves policy. It also found that Motability had charged customers more than £390 million more than necessary for car leases over the past ten years and that the then CEO was entitled to further payments beyond those that had already been disclosed.

In 2018 Mike Betts, the chief executive of Motability Operations agreed to step down (in May 2020), after it was revealed he was to receive a £2.2m bonus on top of his £1.7m pay package. Earlier in 2018 MPs had called his annual pay package “totally unacceptable”.

In March 2025, the government was challenged by MP Jim Allister about why almost half of all new cars registered in Northern Ireland were done so via the scheme.

In April 2026, Disability News Service reported that Motability customer Charlie Proctor had launched legal action against HM Treasury over tax measures affecting the Motability Scheme. The report said the challenge concerned the application of VAT to most advance payments and the removal of an Insurance Premium Tax exemption. Motability Operations said the changes had contributed to revised scheme terms, including lower mileage allowances and higher excess-mileage charges for new leases. Proctor alleged that the measures could disproportionately affect disabled people with higher essential travel needs. HM Treasury said it had received the pre-action letter but would not comment on potential litigation.

== See also ==
- Disabled parking permit
- Wheelchair accessible van
