= Cultural and creative industries =

Range of economic activities

Cultural and creative industries (CCIs) comprise a broad range of economic activities based on the creation, production, distribution and consumption of cultural, artistic and creative goods and services. Despite widespread use in academic research and public policy, there is no universally accepted definition of the concept. The scope of the CCIs varies across countries, institutions and statistical frameworks, reflecting differences in cultural policy, industrial classification systems and national priorities. While most definitions include heritage, museums, libraries, publishing, the visual and performing arts, audiovisual media, architecture, advertising and crafts, others extend the concept to design, fashion, software, video games, gastronomy or cultural tourism.

The concept has evolved significantly since the late twentieth century. Early international frameworks, particularly those developed by UNESCO, focused on cultural activities and their statistical measurement. During the 1980s and 1990s, the notion of cultural industries emerged to recognise the growing economic importance of the production and circulation of cultural goods through market-based industries. In the late 1990s, the concept of creative industries broadened this perspective by incorporating activities whose primary value derives from creativity, knowledge and intellectual property, including design, architecture and advertising. More recently, international organisations and scholars have increasingly adopted the broader combined notion of "cultural and creative industries."

While cultural industries emphasize symbolic and cultural content and copyright-protected creative expression, with a narrower scope centred on arts, heritage, and media, creative industries also include sectors such as advertising, architecture, design, and software, in which creativity functions as a core economic input even when the final product is not necessarily "cultural" in the symbolic sense.

== Cultural industries ==
Cultural industries is a term used to describe economic activities that produce goods and services of a cultural nature, combining artistic creation, cultural knowledge, and intellectual property.

The term was coined in the 1940s by philosophers Theodor Adorno and Max Horkheimer of the Frankfurt School, in the essay "The Culture Industry: Enlightenment as Mass Deception," originally circulated in 1944 and included in the book Dialectic of Enlightenment (1947). In this work, the authors argue that under capitalism, culture ceases to function as autonomous artistic expression and instead operates as a standardized, industrialized product, comparable to other manufactured goods. In this original formulation, the term was deliberately pejorative: it designated a phenomenon the authors considered ideologically homogenizing, not a neutral policy category.

Between the 1970s and 1990s, international organizations and policymakers, notably UNESCO, began using the term "cultural industries" (plural) in a distinct sense, as a sectoral category oriented toward economic growth and employment generation, contrasting with the Frankfurt School's view that mass cultural production was inherently manipulative. This reformulation began treating the value of cultural industries pluralistically, combining economic and cultural/symbolic dimensions, an approach systematized by economist David Throsby, whose work is a central reference in cultural economics.

According to UNESCO's definition, cultural industries are those that combine the creation, production, and commercialization of contents that are intangible and cultural in nature, typically protected by copyright. Under this definition, the field encompasses goods and services that use creativity, cultural knowledge, and intellectual property to generate social and cultural meaning.

David Throsby offers a more analytically precise definition, centered on whether an activity involves creativity oriented toward symbolic meaning, deliberately excluding activities that generate scientific or purely functional knowledge. He models the sector as a series of concentric circles: a core of "core creative arts" (literature, music, performing arts, visual arts), surrounded by "other core cultural industries" (film, museums, galleries, photography), a "wider cultural industries" ring (heritage, publishing, broadcasting, video games), and an outer ring of "related industries" (advertising, architecture, design, fashion). Cultural value decreases moving outward from the core, even as economic weight often increases.

== Creative economy ==
The measurement of the creative economy's contribution to national economies varies considerably depending on whether an approach based on industries (establishments) or on occupations (individuals) is used, contributing to conceptual ambiguity in the field. Within this terminological plurality, related concepts coexist, including the "leisure industry," "knowledge economy," "orange economy," "experience economy," and "copyright industries." This measurement complexity partly reflects the labour-market characteristics of creative workers, who often face high levels of self-employment, multiple job-holding, and underemployment — conditions that tend to be underrepresented by official employment statistics designed around formal contracting and standard labour dependency.

Research applied to developing-country contexts has shown that social, geographic and historical differences require definitions of the creative economy to be adapted locally. In such contexts, artisanal knowledge and traditional cultural production, such as handicrafts or batik, are sometimes incorporated into the creative economy framework through political relabelling, even when these activities involve limited technological innovation or formal intellectual-property management compared to more contemporary creative sectors. By contrast, in high-income countries such as those in North America, Europe and Australia, creative-economy policy tends to be closely linked to strategies of urban regeneration, revitalisation of degraded neighbourhoods, and the development of "creative clusters" or "cultural districts."

The creative economy is often framed as a driver of economic growth and job creation, a means of attracting and training skilled human capital, and a contributor to urban development through agglomeration effects and cultural synergies.

== Creative industries ==
The concept of creative industries emerged during the 1990s as an expansion of the earlier notion of cultural industries. The term was first used in Australia's national cultural policy statement, Creative Nation (1994), and gained international prominence after the United Kingdom established the Creative Industries Task Force in 1997. The UK Department for Culture, Media and Sport (DCMS) subsequently defined creative industries as activities originating in individual creative skill and talent that carry the potential for economic value and employment through the development and exploitation of intellectual property. This marked a shift in policy thinking by extending the scope of cultural industries beyond the traditional arts to include design, architecture, advertising, software, digital media and other knowledge-based sectors in which creativity is a primary economic resource.

Since its emergence, the term has been adopted with varying meanings across countries and international organisations, and there is no universally accepted classification of the creative industries; the sectors considered "core" differ across statistical and policy frameworks.

The concept also became closely associated with theories of urban and regional development. Charles Landry's notion of the creative city argued that creativity should be regarded as a strategic resource for urban regeneration and economic competitiveness. Similarly, Richard Florida's theory of the creative class proposed that cities capable of attracting highly skilled creative professionals would become more innovative and economically dynamic. These ideas strongly influenced urban and regional policy in many countries, encouraging investment in cultural infrastructure, creative clusters and place-based strategies to foster innovation and economic growth.
