= Euan's Guide =

Accessibility review website

Euan’s Guide
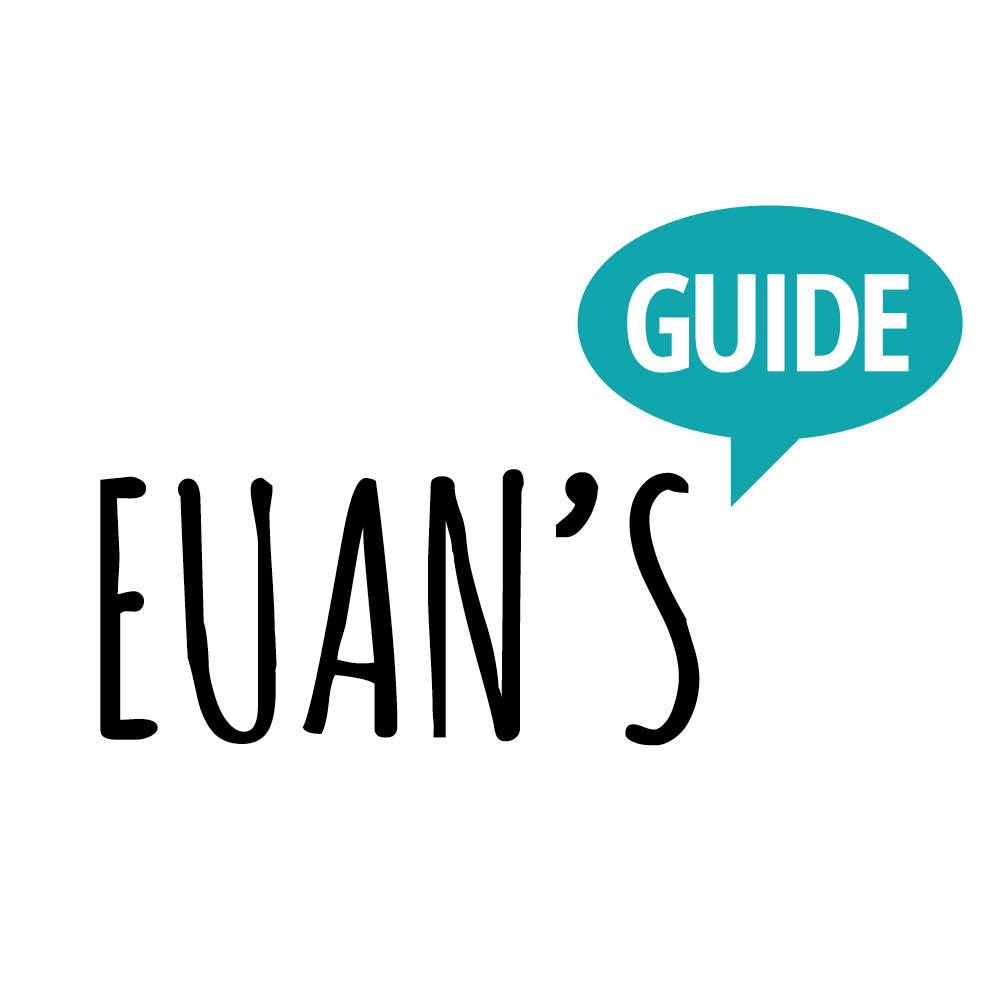
- Website type: User generated reviews
- Headquarters: Edinburgh, Scotland
- Area served: Worldwide
- Founders: Euan MacDonald; Kiki MacDonald
- Industry: Charity
- Website: euansguide.com
- Launched: 2013
- Current status: Active

Euan's Guide is an accessibility review website based in Edinburgh, Scotland. It gives disabled people the opportunity to rate the accessibility of the places they visit and has been described by author Ian Rankin as 'Trip Advisor with wheels on'. It is a registered charity in Scotland (SC045492).

== History ==
The site was co-founded by Euan MacDonald and his sister Kiki. MacDonald used a powerchair and wanted to discover more places to visit. MacDonald said: "Lots of disabled people have favourite places to go out but that information often doesn’t get shared and everyone has to reinvent the wheel. The hope is to provide a platform to share that information and to help people get out." The site has been endorsed by JK Rowling and Professor Stephen Hawking. The Guardian named Euan's Guide as one of the Tech Innovations that could improve lives in 2015 and in 2014 the site won the 'People's Choice Award' at the BT Infinity Lab Connected Society competition. Since October 2014 Euan's Guide carried out The Access Survey, a yearly survey that gathers information on disabled people's experiences and attitudes toward accessibility in the United Kingdom. Euan's Guide was also the lead sponsor of the first Disabled Access Day which took place in 2015.

== Disabled Access Day ==
Euan's Guide is the main sponsor of Disabled Access Day, a biannual event in the United Kingdom, raising awareness of the access issues faced by many disabled people.

== Red Cord Cards ==
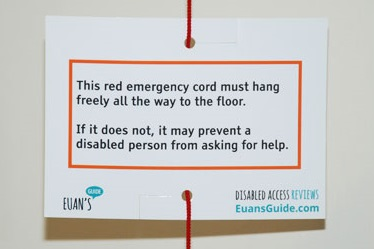
A Euan's Guide emergency Red Cord Card.

Euan's Guide designed information cards to be attached to emergency red pull cords in disabled toilets. They inform people of the importance of leaving the cords untied and reaching all the way to the floor. There have been over 30,000 requests for the cards since the initiative was launched in 2015.
