= Disability in Northern Ireland =

Northern Ireland has differing legislation and policy in relation to disability than in other areas of the UK, due to the various governmental powers and competencies that are devolved to the Northern Ireland Assembly.

== Policy ==
There are a number of key policy areas in relation to disability in Northern Ireland. The primary strategic document, A Strategy to improve the lives of people with disabilities 2012-2015 was published in 2012 by the Office of the First Minister and Deputy First Minister

Other key policies and legislation include:

- Welfare Reform Bill (As of January 2015 this is at consideration stage at the Northern Ireland Assembly)
- Who Cares - Review of Adult Social Care
- Transforming Your Care
- Review of Special Educational Needs and Inclusion
- Disability Employment Strategy
- Mental Capacity Bill
- Accessible Transport Strategy

== Demographics ==
The Northern Ireland 2011 Census, undertaken by Northern Ireland Statistics and Research Agency (NISRA), reported that of a Northern Ireland population of 1,810,863; 20.6% (374,646) reported that their day-to-day activities were limited because of a long-standing health problem or disability. This is comparable to the national figures from the census in Great Britain which reported 17.6% of the population in England, 22.7% in Wales and 20% in Scotland. Similar to all nations of the UK, this Northern Ireland baseline figure varies within regions depending on a number of demographic, health, environmental and economic factors. In Northern Ireland, Strabane and Belfast (both at 24 per cent) had the highest proportions of residents with a long-term health problem or disability.

On Census Day 2011, two-fifths (40 per cent) of households contained at least one person with a long-term health problem or disability; made up of those households with dependent children (9.2 per cent) and those with no dependent children (31 per cent). Strabane (49 per cent) had the highest prevalence rate for households containing someone with a long-term health problem or disability while the lowest prevalence rates were in North Down (34 per cent) and Antrim (36 per cent).

24.8% of adults and 5.4% of children in households reported that their day-to-day activities were limited because of a long-standing health problem or disability. The rate in communal establishments was 66% of adults and for 10% of children.

== Legislation ==
Disability Discrimination Act

Presently people with disabilities in Northern Ireland experience less protection against disability discrimination than their counterparts in the rest of the UK as the Equality Act (2010) was not brought forward in Northern Ireland. In March 2012 the Equality Commission for Northern Ireland (ECNI) published Proposals for Reform which considered changes to legislation to strengthen the protection for disabled people.

UN Convention on the Rights of Persons with Disabilities

The United Nations Convention on the Rights of Persons with Disabilities (UNCRPD), and its Optional Protocol, were ratified by the United Kingdom on 8 June 2009. In Northern Ireland the Office of the First Minister and Deputy First Minister has responsibility for disability legislation and policy and is responsible for co-ordinating the work on the Convention in relation to devolved matters.

Section 75 of the Northern Ireland Act 1998

This law requires public bodies to have due regard to promote equality between people on the following grounds:

- between persons of different religious belief, political opinion, racial group, age,
- marital status or sexual orientation;
- between men and women generally;
- between persons with a disability and persons without; and
- between persons with dependants and persons without

All public bodies therefore have a statutory duty to have due regard for people with disabilities.

The Autism (Northern Ireland) Act 2011

This law has amended the DDA to clarify whether the term disability applies to autism spectrum conditions.

Other legislation

The Special Education Needs and Disability Act 2001, and The Special Educational Needs and Disability (Northern Ireland) Order 2005 offer protection from discrimination in education.

== Attitudes to disability ==
In 2011 the Equality Commission for Northern Ireland published the 'Do You Mean Me?' research findings in regard to attitudes and experience of discrimination in Northern Ireland. This report found that:

- When asked which groups were treated unfairly, the most common answers were people over 70; lesbian, gay or bisexual people and disabled people (all 24%).
- 42% were aware that anti-discrimination laws protect them on the grounds of disability.
- In terms of the three types of disability considered (physical, learning or mental ill-health), as in 2008, mental ill-health evoked the greatest number of negative responses, with 26% saying they would mind (a little or a lot) having a person with mental ill-health as a colleague, while 24% and 37% respectively would mind having this person as a neighbour or as an in-law.
- With regard to the three types of disability, different attitudes were held by respondents depending on the nature of the disability. Negative attitudes towards persons experiencing mental ill-health were twice as prevalent as attitudes towards those with a physical or a learning disability.

Another source of information is the Northern Ireland Survey of Activity Limitation and Disability (2007).

The majority (87%) of respondents said that they are never or only occasionally prevented from doing something because of other people's reactions to their disability or limitation, but 12% said that they are fairly, very often or always prevented from doing things because of other people's reactions to their disability.

Respondents were also asked to identify specific groups of people whose attitudes prevent them from participating in society as much as they would like to. The majority of respondents (83%) said that no one prevents them from participating fully in society. The most common group identified by respondents as preventing them from taking part in society was strangers (as identified by 9% of respondents) followed by acquaintances/colleagues/classmates/neighbours/people in the community (5%) and then immediate family (4%).

== See also ==
- Disability in the United Kingdom
