= Rethink Communications =

Canadian advertising company

Rethink Communications is an independent advertising agency based in Vancouver, British Columbia, Toronto, Ontario and Montreal, Quebec.

The agency was founded on November 1, 1999, by Chris Staples, Ian Grais and Tom Shepansky. All three were formerly employed at Palmer Jarvis DDB (now DDB Vancouver). Staples was the national creative director of that agency; Grais was the creative director and Shepansky was the director of client services.

Staples, Grais and Shepansky opened Rethink with no staff and no clients. In December 1999 they won the Dominion Grocery Store account in Ontario and the A&W Food Services account nationally, in English and French.

In their first year of operation the agency grew to 20 people and was featured on the CBC-TV business program Venture. Rethink made news by offering a money-back guarantee in the form of a five percent rebate to be earned based on client-set criteria. They also launched Rethink Beer to demonstrate their branding abilities. The product was available in BC and Alberta until 2003.

The agency currently handles advertising, design and online work for a range of local, regional and national clients. These include A&W (Canada), Shaw Communications, Molson Coors Brewing Company, IKEA Canada, Coast Capital Savings, WestJet, Mr. Lube, Playland, Science World at TELUS World of Science, and Weston Bakeries.

Rethink was named Canada's Agency of the Year three times: first in November 2003 by Marketing Magazine, and a second and third time by Strategy Magazine in December 2006 and October 2019.

The agency was also ranked by Strategy Magazine as the most award-winning agency in Canada in 2008 and 2009. Partners and co-creative directors Staples and Grais were ranked the most awarded creative directors in 2006, 2008 and 2009 in the same surveys. In March 2025 at the AToMiC Awards, Rethink won 12 Gold trophies for Kraft Heinz, Molson Coors, and Quebec Maple Syrup Producers, and was ranked #1 ageny in Strategy Magazine's 2025 Creative Report Card.

Rethink clients Coast Capital Savings and Mr. Lube were named Marketers of the Year by the BC Chapter of the American Marketing Association in 2006 and 2008 respectively.

On April 5, 2010, Rethink opened an office in Toronto, headed by partner and managing director Pema Hegan and creative director Dre Labre.
