= Disabled Access Day =

Biennial event in the United Kingdom

- Official name: Disabled Access Day
- Observed by: United Kingdom
- Significance: Celebrating accessibility and inclusion across the UK
- Observances: Open days, Accessible events, Celebrations
- Date: March
- Frequency: Biennial

Disabled Access Day is a biennial event in the United Kingdom that celebrates accessibility. The first event was held on Saturday 17 January 2015 and over 200 organisations took part across the UK and further afield. The last Disabled Access Day took place on 16 March 2019. Disabled Access Day was cancelled in 2021 because of the COVID-19 pandemic.

== History ==
Disabled Access Day came about after Paul Ralph, a powerchair user and Euan's Guide supporter, went to a 'try it out day' at his local bus company:

"Prior to this, I had not used the bus network in my hometown because I was unsure how the ramp operated, how ticketing worked and if my powerchair would fit. I attended a demonstration organised by the local bus company with the opportunity to explore a stationary bus. Extra staff were on hand to explain the process of getting on and off safely. There was ample time to become more familiar with the layout of the bus and with what you need to know as a wheelchair using passenger. I'm now a frequent bus user.

Chatting with friends, I thought how great it would be if there were similar initiatives, including some more informal events, happening across the country on one specific day. The idea of encouraging disabled people to also try something new that day appeared and out of it came the idea of Disabled Access Day."

— Paul Ralph

In 2015, the Westminster parliament passed a motion in support of the event. The motion highlighted that several major attractions such as Buckingham Palace and St Paul's Cathedral had signed up. The first event was supported by over 200 museums, galleries, attractions and businesses in the UK.

Following the success of the first event, the second event more than quadrupled in size and was held on 12 March 2016 and the third Disabled Access Day was an extended weekend of activities during 10–12 March 2017. The event became biennial after 2017.

In 2019 Disabled Access Day took place on Saturday 16 March 2019. This was the fourth Disabled Access Day with over 13,000 participants.

Disabled Access Day was cancelled in 2021 due to the COVID-19 pandemic and no new dates have been released.

== Sponsorship ==
Disabled Access Day is sponsored by Euan's Guide, the disabled access review website. Euan's Guide was founded by Euan MacDonald, a powerchair user, and his sister Kiki. Information about accessibility for all places that hold events on Disabled Access Day can be found on the Euan's Guide website.

Other major sponsors of the event include Barclays plc and Sandcastle Water Park.

== Awards and shortlists ==
Cracking Campaign, The Scottish Charity Awards 2016
