= Strategy (magazine) =

Canadian business magazine

- Categories: Business
- Frequency: 18 per year
- Total circulation: 7,872 (December 2011)
- Founded: 1908 (Marketing); 1989 (Strategy)
- Company: Brunico Communications
- Country: Canada
- Language: English
- Website: strategyonline.ca
- ISSN: 0025-3642

Strategy is a Canadian business magazine about marketing, advertising and media. The magazine is published by Brunico Communications and was launched in 1989.

Each year, Strategy hosts a number of industry awards, including Strategy Agency of the Year, the Marketing Awards, the Strategy Awards, the MIAs, and the Shopper Innovations Awards.

It was merged in 2016 with Marketing, a formerly competing title which Brunico acquired from Rogers Media.
