= Deafness in the United Kingdom =

Deafness in the United Kingdom encompasses a diverse community of deaf and hard of hearing (DHH) individuals, each with unique experiences, languages, and communication needs. The UK has had a long history of deaf culture, sign language, and advocacy efforts. British sign language was officially recognized as a minority language in 2003 and gained legal status in 2022. This article explores the current state of human and civil rights for DHH individuals in the UK, including the status of newborn screenings, and family-centered model for early intervention. It also examines employment access, including support through government funded Access to Work grants, which help cover costs of workplace accommodations for DHH individuals.

== Sign language in the United Kingdom ==
=== British Sign Language ===
British Sign Language (BSL) is a sign language used in the United Kingdom and serves as the first and preferred language of the deaf community in the UK. BSL gained official recognition by the UK government after more than 20 years of advocacy. In 2003, the government released a formal statement acknowledging a vote passed in December 2002, which officially recognized BSL as a minority language In 2022, according to an infographic from the World Federation of the Deaf (WFD), BSL was granted legal and official language status.

Parliament passed the British Sign Language Act, which required the Secretary of State to facilitate the use of BSL. However, the language of the bill had been criticized for distancing BSL from its users. The bill failed to include how users of BSL and the deaf community would protected under the law, focusing on broader protections rather than focusing on access to interpreters.

=== Old Kentish Sign Language ===
Old Kentish Sign Language (OKL) was a shared signing community, that never gained legal status, as it has had no known users since the late 1600s due to the language dying off with its users. OKL is currently classified with a status of 10 (Extinct).

== Significant organisations ==
The National Deaf Children's Society was founded in 1944 as Society of St John of Beverley.

1976 saw the establishment of the National Union of the Deaf.

== Universal Neonatal Hearing Screening ==
The Universal Neonatal Hearing Screening (UNHS) has been mandated in the United Kingdom since 2001. In 2017, 98.95% of newborns that were screened, and 2.6% of those infants were referred to an audiologist for follow-up. However, 10.4% of referred infants did not complete follow up testing. After all the screening and diagnostic procedures are completed, approximately 1.6% out of every 1,000 infants are confirmed to have permanent childhood hearing loss (PCHIL).

The average age at which a diagnosis is made for infants who undergo screening is 1.6 months. No data had been provided regarding the average age of diagnosis for infants who are not screened.

== Early childhood intervention ==
Early childhood intervention (ECI) services for hearing loss are available in the United Kingdom, and families have the autonomy to choose which approach best suits their needs. The UK promotes a family centered model to early intervention, with services typically beginning at an average age of 1.64 months old.

According to an international consensus statement published in the Journal of Deaf Studies and Deaf Education in 2013- and later updated in February 2024- best practice principles for family centered ECI for DHH children have been clearly outlined. Including hearing technology, family support, sign language tutors. In all efforts to help families assimilate to an unfamiliar way of life.

Principle 4 (Family Social and Emotional Support). Recognizes any formal or informal assistance the families needs. Which include productive resources that direct parents to organization and peer support groups.

Principle 5 (Family Infant Interaction). Uses everyday routines to establish consistent communication with the child to promote communicative development. Providing resources to help the family adapt to best aid the child's language input. Whether that be learning sign language, that is up to the families choice.

Principle 6 (Use of Assistive Technologies and Supporting Means of Communication). Makes hearing aids, cochlear implants, frequency modulated systems, and other communication approaches accessible to families.

In Dorset, a county in south west England, Qualified Teachers of the Deaf (QToD) are designated as Advisory Teachers. In alignment with Principle 4, they support families and educational institutions in meeting the needs of DHH children. All QToD professionals are required to hold post-graduate diplomas or master's degrees, and typically have experience working in mainstream schools as special education coordinators. A key aspect of their role involves acting as liaisons to monitor and facilitate the educational development of DHH students. They provide communication and language development support- either through speech or sign language- according to each families request. Additionally, they help bridge gaps in the curriculum and provide training to demonstrate how a child's hearing loss may affect access to learning.

According to a guidebook provided by the Early Intervention Foundation, the only listed program specifically addressing the needs of DHH individuals is Auditory Verbal Therapy. This approach is designed to equip parents with tools to develop their child's listening and spoken language abilities, with the goal of enabling the child to access opportunities equivalent to those of hearing peers.

== Employment ==
An estimated 4.4 million Deaf and Hard of Hearing (DHH) individuals of working age reside in the United Kingdom. The employment rate among DHH individuals is approximately 65%, compared to 79% for those without disabilities. Deaf Unity is one job platform that features employment opportunities from companies that actively promote diversity and inclusion. Although laws exist to protect DHH individuals from discrimination in the workplace, certain professions remain challenging to enter due to mandatory medical exams that include hearing test. These professions may be less accessible to DHH and include:

- The armed forces (army, navy, airfare)
- police officers
- commercial airline pilots
- railway engineers
- seafarers (jobs working on boats and ships)

=== Right to work ===
Two major pieces of legislation established employment rights and protections DHH individuals in the UK. The Disability Discrimination Act of 1995 (DDA was the first to provide legal protection against discrimination in employment for individuals with disabilities. This was later expanded by the Equality Act of 2010, which broadened protections to include equal access to public services and accommodations.

Under the Equality Act, employers are required to make reasonable adjustments to accommodate disabled employees, including those who are DHH. One key support available is the Access to Work grant, a government-funded program that helps employers cover the cost of providing support in the workplace.

==== Grants ====
Access to Work offers varying support based on the type of disability and the specific need. To qualify for support during a job interview, an applicant must be at least 16 years old, have a confirmed interview with an employer, reside in England, Scotland or Wales, and require communication support. Covered services for DHH individuals include British Sign Language (BSL) interpreter or lip speakers. The program will pay for serives if the invoiced cost aligns with the amount specified in the application. Access to Work grant may cover 100% of cost of services for employees who apply within the first six weeks of employment, as well as for job interviews. Employer contributions depend on the size of the company. Grants are capped at 57,200 pounds per person annually.

Disability Confident is a voluntary government incentive to help employers recruit, retain, and support disabled individuals in the workplace. While not focusing on DHH specific issues the program strives to provide resources to employers in order to make long term behavioral change, through three scheme levels which are all voluntary and free to the employer.

- Disability Confident: Committed (Level 1)
- Disability Confident: Employer (Level 2)
- Disability Confident: Leader (Level 3)

=== Drivers licenses ===
According to the DVLA (Driver and Vehicle Licensing Agency) DHH individuals are not required to disclose any information about their hearing ability when applying to drive a car or motorcycle. However, discloserure is required for those applying to drive buses, coaches or a lorries. Failure to report this information may result in a fine of up to 1,000 pounds and potential prosecuted if an accident occurs as a result from the undisclosed medical condition.

=== Apprenticeships ===
Apprenticeships offer the opportunity to earn a wage while receiving on-the-job training from experienced professionals. The duration of apprenticeships can range from one to five years, depending on the level.

- Intermediate (Level 2) equivalent to a General Certificate of Secondary Education
- Advanced (Level 3).
- Higher (Level 4,5,6,7) equivalent to a foundational degree and above.
- Degree (Level 6,7) equivalent to a bachelor's or master's degree.

While some apprenticeships require assessments in literacy and mathematics, employers obligated under the Equality Act to provide reasonable accommodations. These may include extra time on an exam or communication support. The Access to Work grant can help cover the costs of such accommodations to promote an inclusive and equitable environment.

== Human and civil rights for DHH People in the United Kingdom ==
=== The UN CRPD ===
Human rights of DHH people (Deaf and Hard of Hearing) are outlined in the United Nations Convention on the Rights of Persons with Disabilities (CRPD). As of 2011, the United Kingdom has not yet ratified the CRPD. While the CRPD addresses a broad range of disabilities, the World Federation of the Deaf (WFD) highlights several articles of particular interest for the Deaf community.

- Sign language rights (Articles 2, 21.b, 21.3, 23.3, and 24.3b )
- Deaf culture and linguistic identity (Article 30.4)
- Bilingual education (Article 24.1, 24.3b, 24.4)
- Lifelong learning (Article 5, 24.5, and 27)
- Accessibility (Articles 9 and 21)
- Equal employment opportunities (Article 27)
- Equal participation (Article 5, 12, 20, 23, 24, 29)

=== United Kingdom's State Party Report ===
The initial country report, which was due in 2011, was published on 24 November 2011. The following is a summary of the most relevant content for DHH communities, based on the WFD's priority areas.

==== Sign Language Rights ====
Article 2: According to the Equality Act of 2010, Great Britain defines whether a person is disabled based on whether or not a person has a physical or mental impairment resulting in long-term effects that lead to their ability to carry out normal day-to-day functions.

Article 21.b: This section of the report mentions that, in 2009, Scotland published, with governmental support, "The Roadmap to British Sign Language and Linguistic Access". It was published in hopes of developing an infrastructure to train and register BSL (British Sign Language) interpreters to address a shortage. To what extent it has contributed is unknown.

Article 21.c: Television channels must air thirty minutes of sign-presented programming a month, according to Television Access regulator Ofcom. As a result, smaller channels joined to fund the British Sign Language Broadcasting Trust, which commissions sign-presented television for the BSL Zone on the Community Channel.

Article 23.3: This section of Article 23 contains no mention of Sign Language rights.

Article 24.3b : (see summary under Bilingual Education)

==== Deaf Culture and Linguistic Identity ====
Article 30.4: Article 30 mentions that no means of support have been implemented to contribute to deaf culture and linguist identity.

==== Bilingual Education ====
Article 24.1DHH individuals will have access to the means of communication, whether in mainstream or specialist schooling. This is determined by their parents and/or local authority/school to consider what is more appropriate, whether through sign language, cued speech, or hearing loops.

Article 24.3b: This section states that disabled students are supported by the institution they attend but does not state how people can seek accommodations, specifically regarding DHH individuals.

Article 24.4: The Register of Support Providers in Northern Ireland provides personal support, including audio-typists, note-takers, and sign language interpreters. This support is limited to those who attend universities in Northern Ireland

==== Lifelong Learning ====
Article 5: This article does not directly mention life-long learning in deaf communities. However, the article details how, under the Equality Act of 2010, anti-discrimination legislation protects people with disabilities from direct/ indirect discrimination. Article 5.2 affords them accommodations/adjustments that are decided upon individual circumstances. Article 5.3 under the Equality Act permits " positive action," which allows employers to choose a potential employee who is equally qualified as their competitor in hopes of equaling the playing field and giving opportunities to under-represented workers.

Article 24.5 (see summary under Bilingual Education)

Article 27 (see summary under Equal Employment Opportunities)

==== Accessibility ====
Article 9: The report mentions an e-Accessibility forum put out by the UK government to ensure more inclusive services can be developed; the extent to which this would benefit DHH individuals is unclear.

Article 21: (see summary under Sign Language Rights)

==== Equal Employment Opportunities ====
Article 27: Article 27 mentions that individuals with disabilities have the right to work with reasonable adjustments and are protected from unfair dismissal. However, no mention of how DHH individuals would benefit in work and employment spaces.

==== Equal Participation ====
Article 5: (see summary under Lifelong Learning)

Article 12: The article does not mention its plan to support equal participation for DHH individuals.

Article 20: There is no mention in the article of its plan to support equal participation for DHH individuals through personal mobility.

Article 23: This article protects DHH individuals right to marriage or civil partnership, fostering, and or adoption. While also laying out how the government supports parents of disabled children. There is nothing specific that is laid out that supports DHH individuals.

Article 24: (see summary under Bilingual Education)

Article 29: DHH individuals have the right to vote and are entitled to accommodations. The UK recognises that there are barriers for disabled people to vote, but there are no clear plans to remove the barriers with DHH individuals in mind.
