= Mandatory reconsideration =

British social security term

A Mandatory reconsideration is a feature of the UK social security system by which an individual can challenge a decision that they disagree with, for instance the decision not to award a benefit. Mandatory reconsideration is a prerequisite for an individual to appeal to a benefit tribunal.

The success rate for Mandatory Reconsideration in relation to Personal Independence Payments is 15%.

In October 2022 there were 90,738 outstanding cases, and 470 additional full-time decision makers had been employed to work on them.
