= Culture Industry Reconsidered =

1963 essay

- Author: Theodor W. Adorno
- Original title: Résumé über Kulturindustrie
- Language: German
- Genre: Philosophy
- Published: 1963
- Publication place: Germany

Culture Industry Reconsidered (German: Résumé über Kulturindustrie) was written in 1963 by Theodor W. Adorno, a German philosopher who belonged to the Frankfurt School of social theory. The term "cultural industry" first appeared in Dialectic of Enlightenment (1947), written by Adorno and Max Horkheimer.

== Content ==
In the essay Cultural Industry Reconsidered, Adorno replaces the expression "mass culture" with "culture industry". This is to avoid the popular understanding of mass culture as the culture that arises from the masses themselves. He prefers the term "culture industry" because of the commodification of art that seeks to control the masses through art consumption, "the customer is not king,...[the customer is] not the culture industry's subject but its object". He further expands upon the culture industry's degradation of art through capitalist means by explaining that as cultural forms create a means of income for their creators, the pursuit of profit becomes more important than the artistic expression. Hence, culture has turned into an industry and the cultural objects are looked at as products. One of the characteristics of cultural industry is that it intentionally integrates both the high and low art.

By referring to the term "industry", Adorno does not point to the production process. Instead he is looking at the "standardization of the thing itself" and to the rationalization of distribution techniques, and not strictly to the production process. It is industrial more in a sociological sense, in terms of incorporation of the industrial forms of organization, even though nothing is manufactured.

He also makes clear the difference between the technique used in cultural industry and the technique used in works of art. In the works of art the technique refers to the formal organization of the object, with its inner logic, whereas in cultural industry it refers to the distribution and the mechanical production. Thus technique in cultural industry is external to the object, whereas in the works of art it is internal.

Adorno says that the masses are secondary and are "an appendage of the machinery" in the cultural industry. He argues that the culture industry claims to bring order in the chaotic world. It provides human beings with something like a standard and an orientation, yet the thing that it is claiming to preserve is actually being destroyed. The essay also expands upon Walter Benjamin’s theory of the "aura", (the context and tradition in which an artwork is made that cannot be reproduced) by explaining that removing the art from its original contexts and traditions, while also being produced with precision and accuracy through the mediums of film and photography, that the culture industry "conserves the decaying aura as a foggy mist" It says that the culture industry doesn’t have an alternative to the aura. Hence, it is going against its own ideologies. Adorno's concept of culture industry indicates the necessity for rethinking his theory of mass culture.
