= Attendance Allowance =

Welfare benefit in the United Kingdom

Attendance Allowance is a non-contributory Social Security benefit paid to elderly disabled people in the United Kingdom. It was introduced in the National Insurance (Old Persons' and Widows' Pension and Attendance Allowance) Act 1970. The benefit is intended to provide support for those who live independently but might otherwise need to go into residential care. It is paid by the Department for Work and Pensions. The Social Security Contributions and Benefits Act 1992, integrated Mobility Allowance and Attendance Allowance into a new benefit Disability Living Allowance for people under 67.

A claimant must show that they need help or have difficulty in connection with their bodily functions or need continual supervision. At night, supervision would have to involve someone being awake to watch over the claimant. Bodily functions are things that most people would do for themselves; they do not include things like cooking, housework or shopping, which many people have done for them. Such help must be needed frequently throughout the day, or during the night the attention required must be prolonged or repeated.

Needs are assessed separately for the benefit and for eligibility for social care, which is run by local authorities.

In 2015, the cost of the benefit was approximately £5 billion and 1.5 million people were receiving it.

== Rates ==
From April 2025:

- Higher rate: £110.40 per week for day and night care, or terminal illness.
- Basic rate: £73.90 per week for day or night care.

== Eligibility ==
The benefit is now for people who are over 65 when they first claim. They must have satisfied the conditions for at least six months before they are entitled unless they are terminally ill - which means not expected to live more than 12 months.

People under 67 cannot apply for this benefit. A claimant cannot apply for Attendance Allowance if they are already claiming Disability Living Allowance or Personal Independence Payment. Those currently claiming Disability Living Allowance and who were born before 8 April 1948 can continue to claim their Disability Living Allowance. To claim Attendance Allowance, claimants must be in Great Britain or Northern Ireland when they claim - although there are some exceptions to this for members and family members of the Armed Forces. They must have been in Great Britain or Northern Ireland (or, for claimants in Northern Ireland, in the Isle of Man, Jersey or Guernsey) for at least 2 of the last 3 years, be habitually resident in the UK, Ireland, Isle of Man or the Channel Islands, and not be subject to immigration control (unless a sponsored immigrant).

Payment stops if the claimant goes into hospital or a care home for more than 4 weeks, or goes abroad for more than 13 weeks (or more than 26 weeks to get medical treatment for a condition which began before they left) and care is paid for by a local authority.

Claims cannot be backdated.

Attendance Allowance is disregarded as income, except for people in residential care.

== Devolution ==
Moving Attendance Allowance from the welfare system into mainstream health and care has been proposed by a number of commentators, including the 2014 Barker commission on the future of the NHS and social care, set up by the King's Fund. The commission said that moving Attendance Allowance to local government would "help create the simpler, graduated pathway of support that we seek". In 2015 the government proposed to give local councils responsibility for paying the benefit.
