= Disability Living Allowance =

Disability benefit in the United Kingdom

Disability Living Allowance (DLA) is a social security benefit in the United Kingdom paid to eligible claimants who have personal care and/or mobility needs as a result of a mental or physical disability. It is tax-free, non-means-tested and non-contributory. The benefit was established by the Social Security Contributions and Benefits Act 1992, integrating the former benefits Mobility Allowance and Attendance Allowance and introducing two additional lower rates of benefit. Prior to 2013 it could be claimed by UK residents aged under sixty five years. However, the benefit was phased-out for the majority of claimants between 2013 and 2015 and replaced by a new Personal Independence Payment. DLA can still be claimed by children under sixteen and can still be received by existing claimants who were aged sixty five or over on 8 April 2013.

== Eligibility ==
DLA is restricted to people who fall into all of the following categories:

- They must ordinarily be resident and present in the UK
- They must meet the rules concerning age: new DLA claims can only be made if the claimant is under 16; however existing claimants can continue to claim DLA if they were born on or before 8 April 1948.
- They must not be living in certain types of residential accommodation
- They must have had a disability for at least three months, and expect it to continue for at least six more months
- They must have care and/or mobility needs.

Usually, to qualify for Disability Living Allowance (DLA) for children the child must:

- Be under sixteen
- Need extra looking after or have walking difficulties
- Be in Great Britain, another European Economic Area (EEA) country or Switzerland when you claim - there are some exceptions, e.g. family members of the Armed Forces
- Be habitually resident in the UK, Ireland, Isle of Man or the Channel Islands
- Not be subject to immigration control
- Have lived in Great Britain for two of the last three years, if over 3 years old

Children under the age of three.

- A child under six months must have lived in Great Britain for at least thirteen weeks.
- A child aged between six months and three years must have lived in Great Britain for at least twenty six of the last 156 weeks.

Individuals can qualify for DLA whether or not they are working. Earnings do not affect the amount of DLA received. People who are terminally ill typically qualify for the highest rate of Care component of DLA under what is termed "special rules".

== Care component ==
DLA care component is paid at one of three rates: lowest, middle and highest. From April 2021 the rates are:

Care component	Weekly rate
Highest rate	£89.60
Middle rate	£60.00
Lowest rate	£23.70

=== Lowest rate eligibility ===
Individuals are entitled to the lowest rate care component if their disability means that they:

- require another person to give them attention in connection with their bodily functions for a significant portion of the day during a single period or a number of periods; or
- cannot prepare a cooked main meal for themselves provided they have all the ingredients and are aged 16 or over.

=== Middle rate eligibility ===
Individuals are entitled to the middle rate care component if their disability means that they:

- require another person to give them frequent attention throughout the day in connection with their bodily functions; or
- require prolonged or repeated attention during the night in connection with their bodily functions; or
- require continual supervision throughout the day in order to avoid substantial danger to themselves or others; or
- require another person to be awake for a prolonged period or at frequent intervals at night, for the purpose of watching over them in order to avoid substantial danger to themselves or others.

=== Highest rate eligibility ===
Individuals are entitled to the highest rate care component if they meet one of the day conditions and one of the night conditions for the middle rate care component.

== Mobility component ==
DLA mobility component is paid at one of two rates: lower and higher. From April 2021 the rates are:

Mobility component	Weekly rate
Higher rate	£62.55
Lower rate	£23.70

=== Lower rate eligibility ===
Individuals are entitled to the lower rate mobility component if, due to a mental or physical disability, they cannot walk outdoors on an unfamiliar route without guidance or supervision from another person most of the time.

=== Higher rate eligibility ===
Individuals are entitled to the higher rate mobility component if they:-

- are physically disabled and as a result are unable, or virtually unable, to walk; or
- are physically disabled and the exertion required to walk would endanger their life or health; or
- have had both legs amputated at or above the ankle, or were born without legs or feet; or are blind and deaf and need someone with them outdoors.
- are severely mentally impaired and/or have severe behavioural problems and receive the highest rate care component.

Mobility allowances (usually using the Motability scheme) are structured to provide persons with disabilities with mechanical aids to their mobility, which may include wheelchairs, scooters, or automobiles.

== See also ==
- Severe Disablement Allowance
- Invalidity Benefit
- Incapacity Benefit
- Attendance Allowance
- Employment and Support Allowance
- Personal Independence Payment
