= Euan MacDonald =

Scottish businessman (1974–2024)

Euan MacDonald MBE
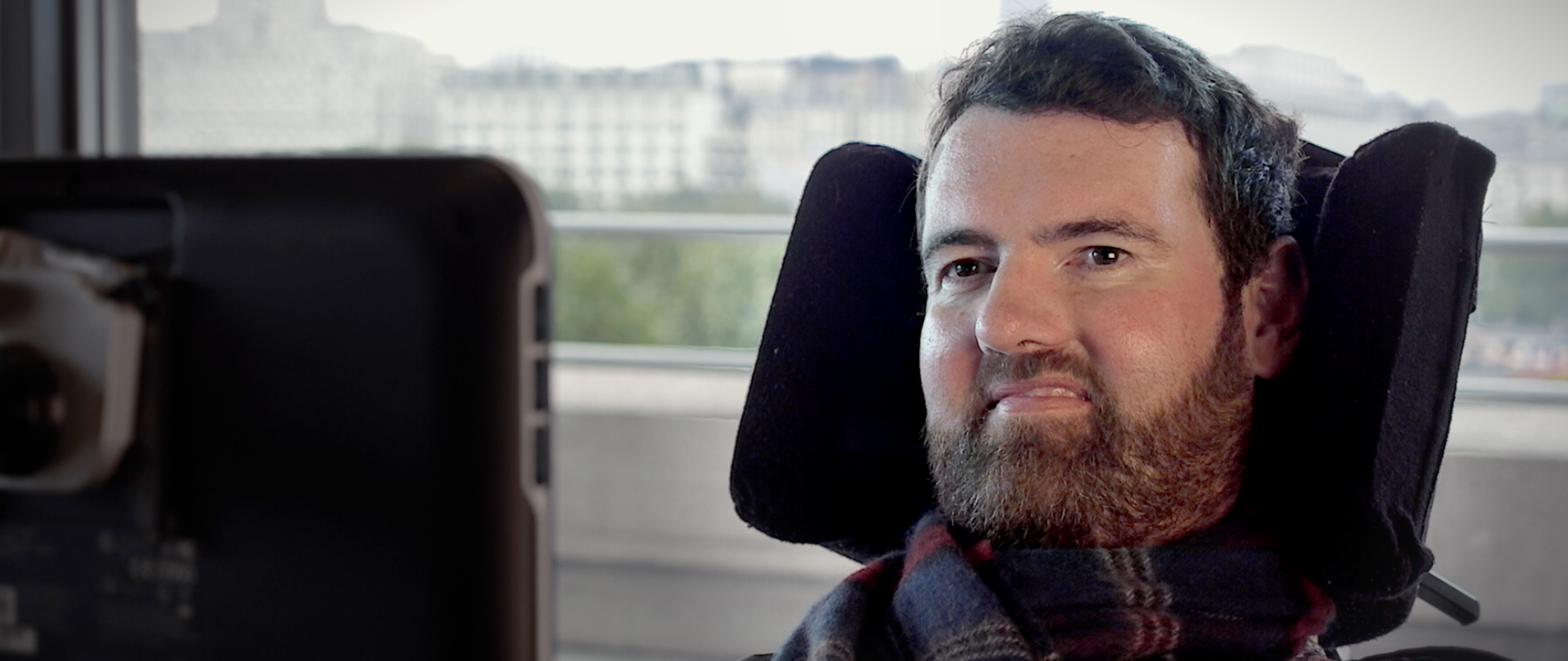
- MacDonald in 2016
- Born: Euan James Stuart MacDonald; 14 August 1974; Sheffield, England
- Died: 21 August 2024 (aged 50); Edinburgh, Scotland
- Education: University of St Andrews; Glenalmond College
- Known for: Euan's Guide; Euan MacDonald Centre
- Spouse: Elizabeth O'Neill
- Children: 2

Euan James Stuart MacDonald MBE (14 August 1974 – 21 August 2024) was a Scottish businessman. He studied at the University of St Andrews and the University of Edinburgh. MacDonald was diagnosed with Motor Neurone Disease (MND) in October 2003.

== Biography ==
MacDonald was born in Sheffield in 1974. He moved to Edinburgh with his parents and siblings at a young age and went to school at George Watson's College before moving to Glenalmond College in Perthshire. Following this he studied at St Andrews, where he met his wife, and Edinburgh University.

MacDonald established The Euan MacDonald Centre for Motor Neurone Disease Research in 2007 in partnership with the University of Edinburgh. With the Informatics Department at the University of Edinburgh, MacDonald also helped establish The Voicebank Study which enables people who are at risk of losing their voice through illness to preserve it. He was appointed a Member of the Order of the British Empire (MBE) in the 2009 Birthday Honours for services to people with motor neurone disease in Scotland.

In 2013, MacDonald co-founded the disabled access review website, Euan's Guide.

In November 2014, MacDonald was named as one of the most influential disabled people in the UK. MacDonald lived in Edinburgh with his wife and his two children.

MacDonald died on 21 August 2024, 21 years after first being diagnosed with motor neurone disease.

== Euan's Guide ==
Euan's Guide is the disabled access review website used by disabled people to review, share and discover accessible places to visit. The charity was founded in 2013 by Euan MacDonald, who was a powerchair user, and his sister Kiki. As Euan's access requirements changed, both went in search of recommendations for accessible places to go, but a platform for this kind of information didn't exist. Built as a friendly and honest alternative to hours of web searching and phone calls before visiting somewhere new, Euan's Guide now has thousands of disabled access reviews and listings for places all over the UK and beyond.

== Awards and shortlists ==
- Points of Light Award
- The Power 100 List 2016
- Commended in the Unsung Hero category at the Herald Society Awards 2015
- The Power 100 List 2015
- MBE for services to people with MND in Scotland
