= Alfred Schmidt bibliography =

The following is a list of the works by Alfred Schmidt, a 20th-century German philosopher, sociologist and critical theorist associated closely with the Frankfurt School. This list also includes information regarding his work as translator and editor.

== Writings ==
=== Books ===
- Der Begriff der Natur in der Lehre von Karl Marx. Frankfurt am Main: Europäische Verlagsanstalt, 1962, DNB 454388497. (4th ed. Hamburg: Europäische Verlagsanstalt, 1993, ISBN 3-434-46209-0.)
  - Italian translation: Il concetto di natura in Marx. Translated by Giorgio Baratta and Giuseppe Bedeschi. Pref. by Lucio Colletti. Bari: Laterza, 1969.
  - English translation: The Concept of Nature in Marx. Translated by Ben Fowkes. London: NLB, 1971, ISBN 0-902308-41-6.
  - Japanese translation: Marukusu no shizen gainen. Translated by Kiyomi Motohama. Tokyo: Hosei University Press, 1972. (Waseda University Library Catalog)
  - Spanish translation: El concepto de naturaleza en Marx. Translated by Julia M. T. Ferrari de Prieto and Eduardo Prieto. 1st ed. México: Siglo Veintiuno, 1976, ISBN 84-323-0263-5.
  - Danish translation: Naturbegrebet hos Marx. Translated by Svend Dindler. Copenhagen: Rhodos, 1976, ISBN 87-7496-489-5.
  - French translation: Le concept de nature chez Marx. Translated by Jacqueline Bois. Paris: Presses Univ. de France, 1994, ISBN 2-13-046128-X.
- Die Zeitschrift für Sozialforschung. Geschichte und gegenwärtige Bedeutung. München: Kösel, 1970, DNB 963976990.
  - Japanese translation: Frankfurt gakuha. "Shakai kenkyūshi" sono rekishi to gendaiteki imi. Translated by Keizō Ikimatsu. Tokyo: Seidosha, 1975. (CiNii Books)
- Hans-Georg Geyer, Hans-Norbert Janowski, Alfred Schmidt: Theologie und Soziologie. Stuttgart: Kohlhammer Verlag, 1970, DNB 456752781.

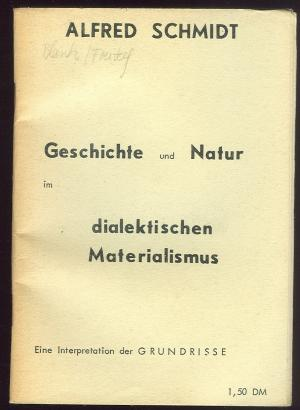
Pirated edition (ca. 1970)

- Geschichte und Natur im dialektischen Materialismus. Eine Interpretation der Grundrisse. Amsterdam: Paco-Verlag, [ca. 1970]. (Pirated edition. Originally published under the title "Zum Verhältnis von Geschichte und Natur im dialektischen Materialismus", in: Existentialismus und Marxismus, Frankfurt: Suhrkamp, 1965.)
- Geschichte und Struktur. Fragen einer marxistischen Historik. München: Hanser, 1971, ISBN 3-446-11504-8.
  - Spanish translation: Historia y estructura. Crítica del estructuralismo marxista. Translated by Gustavo Muñoz. Madrid: Alberto Corazón, 1973, ISBN 84-7053-086-0.
  - Serbo-Croatian translation: Povijest i struktura. Pitanja marksističke historike. Translation: Josip Brkić. Foreword: Davor Rodin. Beograd: Izdavački Centar Komunist, 1976. (Series: Marksističke studije; 3)
  - Japanese translation: Rekishi to kōzō. Marukusu shugiteki rekishi ninshikiron no shomondai. Translated by Kōhei Hanazaki. Tokyo 1977. (CiNii Books)
  - Danish translation: Historie og struktur. Translated by Nina Lykke and Hanne Møller. Copenhagen: Medusa, 1978, ISBN 87-7332-023-4.
  - English translation: History and structure. An essay on Hegelian-Marxist and structuralist theories of history. Translated by Jeffrey Herf. Cambridge, Mass.: MIT Press, 1981, ISBN 0-262-19198-9.
- Herbert Marcuse and Alfred Schmidt: Existenzialistische Marx-Interpretation. Frankfurt am Main: Europäische Verlagsanstalt, 1973, ISBN 3-434-20055-X. (Series: Studien zur Gesellschaftstheorie.)
- Emanzipatorische Sinnlichkeit. Ludwig Feuerbachs anthropologischer Materialismus. München: Hanser, 1973, ISBN 3-446-11652-4.
  - Spanish translation: Feuerbach, o, La sensualidad emancipada. Translated by Julio Carabaña. Madrid: Taurus, 1975, ISBN 84-306-1129-0.
- Zur Idee der Kritischen Theorie. Elemente der Philosophie Max Horkheimers. München: Hanser, 1974, ISBN 3-446-11863-2.
- Alfred Schmidt and Gian Enrico Rusconi: La scuola di Francoforte. Origini e significato attuale. Bari: De Donato, 1972. (SWB union catalog) (in Italian)
  - Serbo-Croatian translation: Frankfurtska škola. Beograd: Komunist, 1974. (Series: Marksizam i savremenost; Kolo 3, knj. 2)
- Werner Post and Alfred Schmidt: Was ist Materialismus? München: Kösel, 1975, ISBN 3-466-40000-7.
- Die Kritische Theorie als Geschichtsphilosophie. München: Hanser 1976, ISBN 3-446-12201-X.
- Drei Studien über Materialismus. Schopenhauer. Horkheimer. Glücksproblem. München: Hanser, 1977, ISBN 3-446-12460-8.

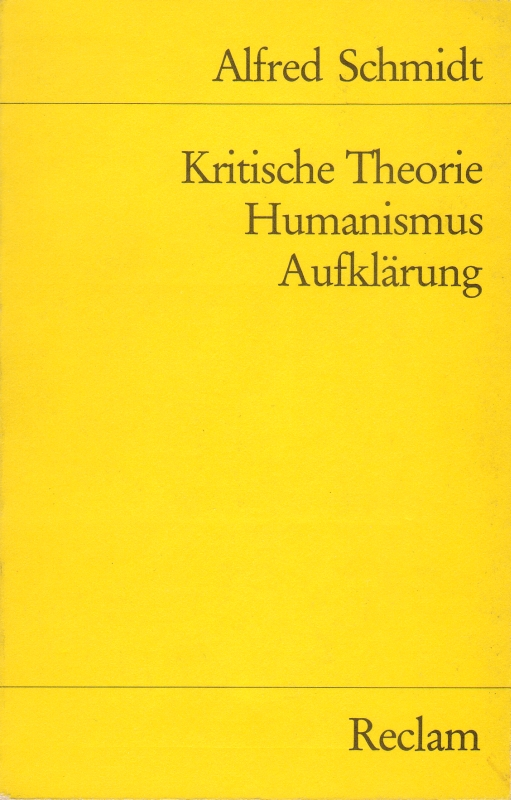
School edition, Stuttgart 1981

- Kritische Theorie, Humanismus, Aufklärung. Philosophische Arbeiten. Stuttgart: Reclam, 1981, ISBN 3-15-009977-3.
- Goethes herrlich leuchtende Natur. Philosophische Studie zur deutschen Spätaufklärung. München: Hanser, 1984, ISBN 3-446-14141-3.
- Die Wahrheit im Gewande der Lüge. Schopenhauers Religionsphilosophie. München; Zürich: Piper, 1986, ISBN 3-492-10639-0.
- Idee und Weltwille. Schopenhauer als Kritiker Hegels. München; Wien: Hanser, 1988, ISBN 3-446-15161-3.
  - Japanese translation: Rinen to sekai ishi. Hēgeru no hihansha to shite no shōpenhauā. Translated by Naotake Tōge. Kyoto 1995. (CiNii Books)
- Alfred Schmidt and Bernard Görlich: Philosophie nach Freud. Das Vermächtnis eines geistigen Naturforschers. Lüneburg: zu Klampen, 1995, ISBN 3-924245-47-9
- Tugend und Weltlauf. Vorträge und Aufsätze über die Philosophie Schopenhauers (1960–2003). Frankfurt am Main: Lang, 2004, ISBN 3-631-38001-1.
- Entstehungsgeschichte der humanitären Freimaurerei. Deistische Wurzeln und Aspekte. Ed. by Klaus-Jürgen Grün and Thomas Forwe. Leipzig: Salier-Verlag, 2014, ISBN 978-3-943539-40-0 (posthumous)

=== Articles, lectures and essays ===
- Existentialismus und Marxismus. Eine Kontroverse zwischen Sartre, Garaudy, Hyppolite, Vigier und Orcel. Mit einem Beitrag von Alfred Schmidt. Frankfurt am Main: Suhrkamp, 1965. (Series: edition suhrkamp, vol. 116)
- "Praxis", in: Hermann Krings, Hans Michael Baumgartner, Christoph Wild (eds.): Handbuch Philosophischer Grundbegriffe. Studienausgabe, vol. 4. Kösel: München, 1973, ISBN 3-466-40058-9, pp. 1107–1138.
- "Humanismus als Naturbeherrschung", in: Merkur, vol. 33 (1979), no. 8, pp. 827–832.
- "Denker der geschichtlichen Wirklichkeit. In memoriam Herbert Marcuse", in: Merkur, vol. 33 (1979), no. 9, pp. 924–926.
- "Anthropologie und Ontologie bei Ernst Bloch", in: Merkur, vol. 35 (1981), no. 2, pp. 117–134.
- "Die in Naturgeschichte verstrickte Menschheit. Überlegungen anläßlich des 100. Todestages von Karl Marx", in: Merkur, vol. 37 (1983), no. 3, pp. 359–361.
- "Deutungen des Mythos im achtzehnten und neunzehnten Jahrhundert. Von Heyne zu Marx", in: Peter Kemper: Macht des Mythos – Ohnmacht der Vernunft? Frankfurt am Main: Fischer-Taschenbuch-Verlag, 1989, ISBN 3-596-26643-2, pp. 125–147.
- "Heidegger und die Frankfurter Schule – Herbert Marcuses Heidegger-Marxismus", in: Peter Kemper (ed): Martin Heidegger – Faszination und Erschrecken. Frankfurt am Main; New York: Campus, 1990, ISBN 3-593-34372-X, pp. 153–177.
- "Herbert Marcuse – Versuch einer Vergegenwärtigung seiner sozialphilosophischen und politischen Ideen", in: Institut für Sozialforschung (ed): Kritik und Utopie im Werk von Herbert Marcuse. Frankfurt am Main: Suhrkamp, 1992, ISBN 978-3-518-28637-1, pp. 11–50.

=== Radio lectures ===
- Ludwig Feuerbach und die Negation aller Schulphilosophie. Hessischer Rundfunk, Abendstudio, September 12, 1972.
- Sokrates als Vollender der griechischen Aufklärung. Hessischer Rundfunk, Abendstudio, July 22, 1980.
- Die Freiheit des Individuums in der Philosophie Jean-Paul Sartres. Hessischer Rundfunk, Abendstudio, December 8, 1981.
- Von Vico zum historischen Materialismus. Hessischer Rundfunk, Abendstudio, December 28, 1988.
- Die politische Dimension einer Philosophie. Herbert Marcuses Heidegger-Marxismus. Hessischer Rundfunk, Abendstudio, December 12, 1989.

== Translations ==
- Herbert Marcuse: Die Gesellschaftslehre des sowjetischen Marxismus. Neuwied; Berlin: Luchterhand, 1964. (English: Soviet Marxism.)
- Henri Lefèbvre: Probleme des Marxismus, heute. Frankfurt: Suhrkamp, 1965. (French: Problèmes actuels du marxisme.)
- Henri Lefèbvre: Der dialektische Materialismus. Frankfurt: Suhrkamp, 1966. (French: Le matérialisme dialectique.)
- Robert Paul Wolff, Barrington Moore and Herbert Marcuse: Kritik der reinen Toleranz. Frankfurt: Suhrkamp, 1966. (English: A Critique of Pure Tolerance.)
- Max Horkheimer: Kritik der instrumentellen Vernunft. Frankfurt: S. Fischer, 1967. (English: Eclipse of Reason.)
- Herbert Marcuse: Der eindimensionale Mensch. Studien zur Ideologie der fortgeschrittenen Industriegesellschaft. Neuwied; Berlin: Luchterhand, 1967. (4th. ed., dtv: München 2004. ISBN 3-423-34084-3. English: One-Dimensional Man.)
- Herbert Marcuse: Versuch über die Befreiung. Übersetzt von Helmut Reinicke und Alfred Schmidt. Frankfurt: Suhrkamp, 1969. (English: An Essay on Liberation.)

== Editorship ==
- Walter Euchner and Alfred Schmidt (eds.): Kritik der politischen Ökonomie heute. 100 Jahre "Kapital". Referate und Diskussionen vom Frankfurter Colloquium im September 1967. Frankfurt: Europäische Verlagsanstalt; Wien: Europa-Verlag, 1968, DNB 457299002.
- Anton Pannekoek: Lenin als Philosoph. Frankfurt am Main: Europäische Verlagsanstalt, 1969.
- Beiträge zur marxistischen Erkenntnistheorie. Aufsätze von György Márkus, Jindřich Zelený, E. W. Iljenkow, Hans-Georg Backhaus, Henri Lefèbvre, Alfred Schmidt. Frankfurt am Main: Suhrkamp, 1969. (Series: edition suhrkamp, vol. 349)
- Max Horkheimer: Gesammelte Schriften, vol. 1–19. Ed. by Alfred Schmidt and Gunzelin Schmid Noerr. Frankfurt am Main: S. Fischer, 1985-1996.
- Alfred Schmidt and Klaus-Jürgen Grün (eds.): Durchgeistete Natur. Ihre Präsenz in Goethes Dichtung, Wissenschaft und Philosophie. Frankfurt am Main; New York: P. Lang, 2000, ISBN 3-631-35570-X.
- Iring Fetscher and Alfred Schmidt (eds.): Emanzipation als Versöhnung. Zu Adornos Kritik der "Warentausch"-Gesellschaft und Perspektiven der Transformation. Frankfurt am Main: Verlag Neue Kritik, 2002, ISBN 3-8015-0356-9.

== Festschrift ==
- Kritischer Materialismus. Zur Diskussion eines Materialismus der Praxis. Für Alfred Schmidt zum 60. Geburtstag. Ed. by Matthias Lutz-Bachmann and Gunzelin Schmid Noerr. München; Wien: Hanser, 1991, ISBN 3-446-16212-7. (Series: Edition Akzente)
- Idee, Natur und Geschichte. Alfred Schmidt zum sechzigsten Geburtstag. Ed. by Klaus-Jürgen Grün and Matthias Jung. Hildesheim; Zürich; New York: Olms, 1991, ISBN 3-487-09473-8.
- Für einen realen Humanismus. Festschrift zum 75. Geburtstag von Alfred Schmidt. Ed. by Wolfgang Jordan and Michael Jeske. Frankfurt am Main: Lang, 2006, ISBN 3-631-55222-X. (Series: Philosophie in Geschichte und Gegenwart, vol. 2.)
