= Marcuse (disambiguation) =

Herbert Marcuse (1898–1979) was a German-American Marxist philosopher and prominent member of the Frankfurt School.

Marcuse may also refer to:

== Surname ==
- Charley Marcuse, hot dog vendor
- Gary Marcuse, Canadian documentary filmmaker
- Harold Marcuse (born 1957), professor of modern German history at the University of California, Santa Barbara; grandson of Herbert Marcuse
- Herman Marcuse (born 17 April 1919), career attorney in the Office of Legal Counsel
- Irene Marcuse, American novelist; granddaughter of Herbert Marcuse
- Judith Marcuse (born 1947), Canadian dancer and choreographer
- Ludwig Marcuse (1894–1971), Jewish German philosopher
- Max Marcuse (1877–1963), German dermatologist and sexologist
- Peter Marcuse, professor emeritus of Urban Planning at Columbia University; son of Herbert Marcuse
- Theo Marcuse, American character actor
- Rudolf Marcuse (1878–1940), German sculptor

== Other uses ==
- Marcuse Pfeifer (1936–2020), American gallerist
- Hasker and Marcuse Factory, a historic factory building located in Richmond, Virginia
