= List of works in critical theory =

This is a list of important and seminal works in the field of critical theory.

- Otto Maria Carpeaux
  - História da Literatura Ocidental, 8 vol. (Portuguese, 1959–66)
- M. H. Abrams
  - The Mirror and the Lamp: Romantic Theory and the Critical Tradition
- Angela Davis
  - Women, Race, and Class
  - Are Prisons Obsolete?
- Theodor Adorno
  - Aesthetic Theory
  - Negative Dialectics
- Theodor Adorno & Max Horkheimer
  - Dialectic of Enlightenment
- Louis Althusser
  - For Marx
  - Lenin and Philosophy
- Erich Auerbach
  - Mimesis: The Representation of Reality in Western Literature
- Mikhail Bakhtin
  - Discourse in the Novel
  - Rabelais and his World
- Roland Barthes
  - Image, Music, Text
  - Mythologies (book)
- Jean Baudrillard
  - The Perfect Crime
  - Simulation and Simulacra
- Walter Benjamin
  - Illuminations
  - The Origin of German Tragic Drama
- Homi K. Bhabha
  - The Location of Culture
- Pierre Bourdieu
  - La distinction
- Kenneth Burke
  - A Rhetoric of Motives
  - A Grammar of Motives
- John Brannigan
  - New Historicism and Cultural Materialism
- Cleanth Brooks
  - The Well Wrought Urn: Studies in the Structure of Poetry
- Sean Burke
  - The Death and Return of the Author
- Judith Butler
  - Bodies That Matter
  - Gender Trouble: Feminism and the Subversion of Identity
- Cathy Caruth
  - Unclaimed Experience: Trauma, Narrative and History
- Samuel Taylor Coleridge
  - Biographia Literaria
- Jonathan Culler
  - Structuralist Poetics
  - The Pursuit of Signs
  - Literary Theory: A Very Short Introduction
- Guy Debord
  - The Society of the Spectacle
- Gilles Deleuze
  - Difference and Repetition
- Gilles Deleuze and Félix Guattari
  - Capitalism and Schizophrenia: Anti-Oedipus (pt.1) and A Thousand Plateaus (pt.2)
- Jacques Derrida
  - Of Grammatology
  - Writing and Difference
- Peter Dews
  - The Limits of Disenchantment
  - The Logic of Disintigration
- Terry Eagleton
  - Marxism and Literary Criticism
  - The Idea of Culture
- Antony Easthope
  - The Unconscious
- William Empson
  - Seven Types of Ambiguity
  - Some Versions of Pastoral
  - The Structure of Complex Words
- Norman Fairclough
  - Language and Power
  - Critical Discourse Analysis
- Frantz Fanon
  - Black Skins, White Masks
- Stanley Fish
  - Is There a Text in this Class?
- Northrop Frye
  - Anatomy of Criticism
- Gerald Graff
  - Literature Against Itself
- Jürgen Habermas
  - Legitimation Crisis
  - The Theory of Communicative Action, volumes 1 & 2
  - The Philosophical Discourse of Modernity
- Wolfgang Iser
  - The Act of Reading: a Theory of Aesthetic Response
- Leonard Jackson
  - The Poverty of Structuralism
- Fredric Jameson
  - The Political Unconscious
  - Postmodernism, or, the Cultural Logic of Late Capitalism
  - The Prison-House of Language
- Frank Kermode
  - Romantic Image
- Julia Kristeva
  - Desire in Language
  - Powers of Horror
- Jacques Lacan
  - Ecrits
  - The Seminars
- F.R. Leavis
  - The Great Tradition
- Ania Loomba
  - Colonialism/Postcolonialism
- Herbert Marcuse
  - Reason and Revolution. Hegel and the Rise of Social Theory
  - Eros and Civilization
  - Soviet Marxism. A Critical Analysis
  - One-Dimensional Man
- Toril Moi
  - Sexual/Textual Politics
- I.A. Richards
  - Practical Criticism: A Study of Literary Judgement
  - Principles of Literary Criticism
- K.K. Ruthven
  - Critical Assumptions
- Edward Said
  - Culture and Imperialism
  - Orientalism (1978)
- Jean-Paul Sartre
  - What Is Literature? (1947)
- Ferdinand de Saussure
  - Cours de linguistique générale (posthumously 1916)
- Alfred Schmidt
  - The Concept of Nature in Marx (1962)
  - Zur Idee der Kritischen Theorie (German, 1974)
- Eve Kosofsky Sedgwick
  - Between Men
  - Epistemology of the Closet
- Susan Sontag
  - Against Interpretation
  - Styles of Radical Will
  - Under the Sign of Saturn
  - Where The Stress Falls
- Gayatri Chakravorty Spivak
  - "Can the Subaltern Speak?"
  - In Other Worlds
- Raymond Tallis
  - Not Saussure
- Scott Wilson
  - Cultural Materialism
- W.K. Wimsatt
  - The Verbal Icon
- Virginia Woolf
  - A Room of One's Own
- Slavoj Žižek
  - The Sublime Object of Ideology
  - The Ticklish Subject: The Absent Centre of Political Ontology

== See also ==
- List of critical theorists
- Outline of critical theory
- Pedagogy of the Oppressed (1968)
