= Outline of critical theory =

Approach to social philosophy

The following outline is provided as an overview of and topical guide to critical theory:

Critical theory is a social, historical, and political school of thought and philosophical perspective which centers on analyzing and challenging systemic power relations in society, arguing that knowledge, truth, and social structures are fundamentally shaped by power dynamics between dominant and oppressed groups. Beyond just understanding and critiquing these dynamics, it explicitly aims to transform society through praxis and collective action with an explicit sociopolitical purpose.

== Essence of critical theory ==
- Critical theorists –
- Works in critical theory –
- Dialectical method –

=== Concepts ===
- Aesthetics
- Ideology
- Politics
- History
- Historicity
- Humanism
- Technology
- Law
- Wages
- Anthropology

== Branches of critical theory ==
- Social science –
- Anthropology –
- Political theory –
- Aesthetics –
- Modernism –
- Post-modernism –
- Realism –

== Actor–network theory ==
=== Commonly used terms ===
- Articulation (sociology)
- Assemblage (philosophy)
- Blackboxing

== African-American studies ==
- Henry Louis Gates Jr. –
- Frantz Fanon –

== Gender studies ==
- Lauren Berlant –
- Judith Butler –
- Raewyn Connell –
- Susan McClary –
- Laura Mulvey –

== Marxist theory ==
- Frankfurt School –
  - Theodor Adorno –
  - Herbert Marcuse –
  - Walter Benjamin –
  - Jürgen Habermas –
  - Max Horkheimer –
  - Friedrich Pollock –
- Louis Althusser –
- Mikhail Bakhtin –
- Étienne Balibar –
- Ernst Bloch –
- Antonio Gramsci –
- Michael Hardt –
- Fredric Jameson –
- Ernesto Laclau –
- Georg Lukács –
- Chantal Mouffe –
- Antonio Negri –
- Valentin Voloshinov –
- Slavoj Žižek –
- Hegemony –
- Posthegemony –

=== Commonly used terms ===
- Marx's theory of alienation
- Capital (Marxism)
- Commodity fetishism
- Division of labour
- Exchange value
- Feudalism
- Historical materialism
- Labour power
- Mode of production
- Neo-Marxism
- Praxis (process)
- Proletariat
- Relations of production
- Surplus value
- Symbolic capital
- Use value
- Usury

== Postcolonialism ==
- Chinua Achebe –
  - "An Image of Africa" –
- Frantz Fanon –
  - "The Wretched of the Earth" –
- Homi Bhabha –
  - Double consciousness –

== Structuralism ==
- Roland Barthes –
- Ferdinand de Saussure –
- Claude Lévi-Strauss –
- Louis Althusser –

== Post-structuralism ==
- Roland Barthes –
- Michel Foucault –
- Julia Kristeva –
- Bruno Latour –

=== Commonly used terms ===
- Critical apparatus
- Event (philosophy)
- Genealogy (philosophy)
- Heterotopia (space)

== Deconstruction ==
- Geoffrey Bennington –
- Hélène Cixous –
- Jonathan Culler –
- Jacques Derrida –
- Werner Hamacher –
- Geoffrey Hartman –
- Martin Heidegger –
- Philippe Lacoue-Labarthe –
- Jean-François Lyotard –
- Paul de Man –
- J. Hillis Miller –
- Jean-Luc Nancy –
- Christopher Norris –
- Avital Ronell –
- Gayatri Chakravorty Spivak –

=== Commonly used terms ===
- Bricolage

== Postmodern philosophy ==
- Jean-François Lyotard –
- Gilles Deleuze –
- Félix Guattari –
- Ernesto Laclau –
- Claude Lefort –
- A Cyborg Manifesto –

== Reconstructivism ==
- Paulo Freire –
- John Dewey –

== Psychoanalytic theory ==
- Luce Irigaray –
- Teresa de Lauretis –
- Jacques Lacan –
- Julia Kristeva –
- Slavoj Žižek –
- Sigmund Freud –
  - The Interpretation of Dreams –
  - On Narcissism –
  - Totem and Taboo –
  - Beyond the Pleasure Principle –
  - The Ego and the Id –
  - The Future of an Illusion –
  - Civilization and Its Discontents –
  - Moses and Monotheism –

=== Commonly used terms ===
- Abjection
- Cathexis
- Chora
- Condensation (psychology)
- Content (Freudian dream analysis)
- Death Drive
- Desire
- Displacement (psychology)
- Ego ideal
- Fetishism
- Fixation (psychology)
- Id, ego and super-ego
- Gaze
- Hysteria
- Identification (psychology)
- Instinct
- Introjection
- Jouissance
- Lack (psychoanalysis)
- Libido
- Mirror stage
- Name of the Father
- Narcissism
- Neurosis
- Objet petit a
- Oedipus complex
- Other (philosophy)
- Perversion
- Pleasure principle (psychology)
- Psychological projection
- Psychosexual development
- Psychological projection
- Reality principle
- Regression (psychology)
- Repression (psychoanalysis)
- Signs and symptoms
- Suture/Quilting Point
- Sublime (philosophy)
- The Imaginary (psychoanalysis)
- The Real
- The Symbolic
- Transference
- Uncanny
- Unconscious mind

== Schizoanalytic theory ==
- Félix Guattari –
- Gilles Deleuze –
- Deleuze and Guattari –

=== Commonly used terms ===
- Assemblage (philosophy)
- Body without organs
- Rhizome (philosophy)

== Queer theory ==
- Judith Butler –
- Heteronormativity –
- Eve Kosofsky Sedgwick –
- Gloria E. Anzaldúa –
- New Queer Cinema –
- Queer pedagogy –

== Semiotics ==
- Roland Barthes –
- Julia Kristeva –
- Charles Sanders Peirce –
- Ferdinand de Saussure –

=== Commonly used terms ===
- Semiotic square

== Literary theory ==
- Mikhail Bakhtin
- Mary Louise Pratt –
- René Girard –

=== Commonly used terms ===
- Carnivalesque
- Chronotope
- Dialogic
- Narratology
- Heteroglossia

== Theories of identity ==
- Private sphere – certain sector of societal life in which an individual enjoys a degree of authority, unhampered by interventions from governmental or other institutions. Examples of the private sphere are family and home. The complement or opposite of public sphere.
- Public sphere – area in social life where individuals can come together to freely discuss and identify societal problems, and through that discussion influence political action. It is "a discursive space in which individuals and groups congregate to discuss matters of mutual interest and, where possible, to reach a common judgment".
- Creolization

== Major works ==
- Bloch, Ernst (1938–47). The Principle of Hope
- Fromm, Erich (1941). The Fear of Freedom (UK)/Escape from Freedom (US)
- Horkheimer, Max; Adorno, Theodor W. (1944–47). Dialectic of Enlightenment
- Barthes, Roland (1957). Mythologies
- Habermas, Jürgen (1962). The Structural Transformation of the Public Sphere
- Marcuse, Herbert (1964). One-Dimensional Man
- Adorno, Theodor W. (1966). Negative Dialectics
- Derrida, Jacques (1967). Of Grammatology
- Derrida, Jacques (1967). Writing and Difference
- Habermas, Jürgen (1981). The Theory of Communicative Action

== Major theorists ==
- Theodor Adorno –
- Max Horkheimer –
- Louis Althusser –
- Roland Barthes –
- Jean Baudrillard –
- Jacques Lacan –
- Jacques Derrida –
- Erich Fromm –
- Jürgen Habermas –
- Herbert Marcuse –
