= Long march through the institutions =

Strategy of building skills and counterinstutions

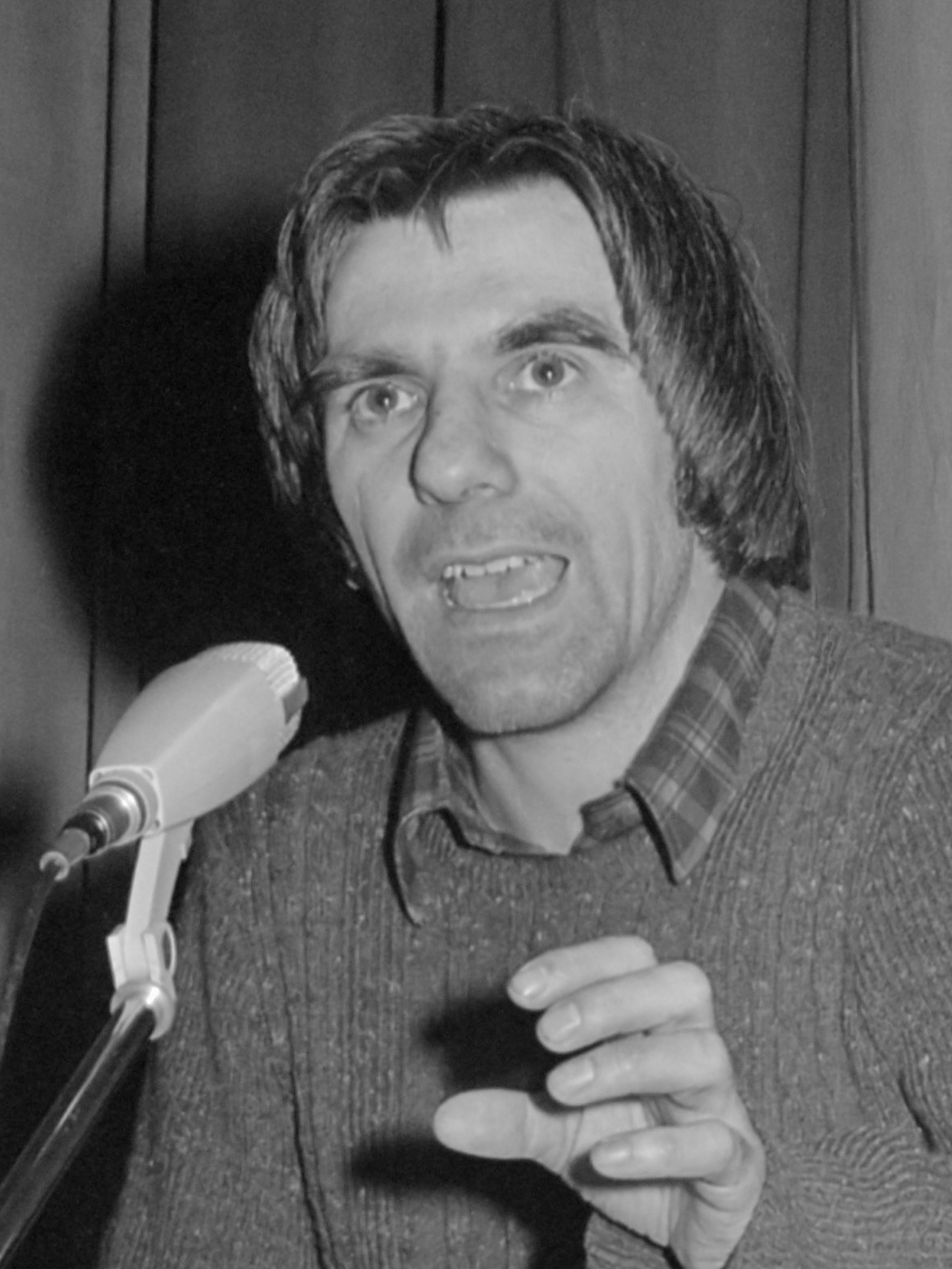
Rudi Dutschke

The long march through the institutions (German: der lange Marsch durch die Institutionen) is a slogan coined by the German socialist student activist Rudi Dutschke around 1967 to describe his strategy to create radical change in government (particularly West Germany) by becoming part of it. The phrase "long march" is a reference to the physical Long March of the Chinese communist army.

== Influences ==
Similarities have been drawn between the long march and Antonio Gramsci's idea of "war of position". Evidence is lacking, however, that Dutschke was aware of Gramsci's work at the time. There is no mention of Gramsci in Dutschke's diaries or biography, contrasting with many mentions of György Lukács, Che Guevara, and Mao Zedong.

Marxist philosopher Ernst Bloch met Dutschke at Bad Boll in 1968, and admired his integrity and determination, qualities that he had written about in The Principle of Hope (Das Prinzip Hoffnung) as being essential for the achievement of utopia.

German-American philosopher Herbert Marcuse and Dutschke worked together at least as early as 1966, when they organized an anti-war conference at the Institute for Social Research. Marcuse wrote to Dutschke in 1971 to agree with this strategy: "Let me tell you this: that I regard your notion of the 'long march through the institutions' as the only effective way..." In his 1972 book, Counterrevolution and Revolt, Marcuse wrote:

To extend the base of the student movement, Rudi Dutschke has proposed the strategy of the long march through the institutions: working against the established institutions while working within them, but not simply by 'boring from within', rather by 'doing the job', learning (how to program and read computers, how to teach at all levels of education, how to use the mass media, how to organize production, how to recognize and eschew planned obsolescence, how to design, et cetera), and at the same time preserving one's own consciousness in working with others.
The long march includes the concerted effort to build up counterinstitutions. They have long been an aim of the movement, but the lack of funds was greatly responsible for their weakness and their inferior quality. They must be made competitive. This is especially important for the development of radical, "free" media. The fact that the radical Left has no equal access to the great chains of information and indoctrination is largely responsible for its isolation.

== Commentary ==
Roger Kimball wrote that it was by these means of "insinuation and infiltration" that the countercultural ideals of Herbert Marcuse gained influence. Helmut Schelsky wrote that the long march was part of a strategy towards "the conquest of the system" (German: Systemüberwindung) through efforts to discredit the values and processes of constitutional democracy.

The long march through the institutions has been invoked by American commentators as an explanation for the dominance of left wing thought in academia and government, as social justice activists active in the 1960s and 1970s dispersed throughout various centers of power. One version, attributed by pundit Jonathan Chait to conservative activist Chris Rufo "posits that the 1960s far left hit a wall when the working class failed to support its revolutionary program, and instead decided to gain control of society from above by burrowing into its elite sectors"

== See also ==
- Entryism
- Fifth column
- Paradigm shift
- Vanguardism
- New Left
- New Communism movement
- West German student movement
- Revisionism (Marxism)
- Robert Conquest's Laws
