= Repressive desublimation =

Concept of commodification of art

In advanced industrial societies, repressive desublimation is the way that "the progress of technological rationality is liquidating the oppositional and transcending elements in the 'higher culture'". In other words, where art was previously a way to represent "that which is" from "that which is not", capitalist society causes the "flattening out" of art into a commodity incorporated into society itself. As its coiner Herbert Marcuse put it in One-Dimensional Man: "The music of the soul is also the music of salesmanship."

By offering instantaneous, rather than mediated, gratifications, repressive desublimation was considered by Marcuse to remove the energies otherwise available for a social critique; and thus to function as an emancipating dynamic under the guise of collectivist politics.

== Origins and influence ==
The roots of Marcuse's concept have been traced to the earlier writings of Wilhelm Reich and Theodor Adorno, as well as to a shared knowledge of the Freudian idea of the involution of sublimation.

Marcuse's idea fed into the student activism of the 1960s, as well as being debated at a more formal level by figures such as Hannah Arendt and Norman O. Brown. A decade later, Ernest Mandel took up Marcuse's theme in his analysis of how dreams of escape through sex (or drugs) were commodified as part of the growing commercialisation of leisure in late capitalism.

The central logic of Marcuse's thought concerned itself with "repression" in late capitalism, which operates not through control and denial, but allowance and expression. Here the social "no" is eliminated, wherein all pleasures become allowed – in commodified form – leading to the controlled expression of all desires and wants, as the presentation and manipulation of these into prefabricated commodified forms becomes the crucial tool of recuperation and control in post-industrial capital. False consciousness is perpetuated and the free exercise and pursuit of pleasure becomes a strategy of containment, as individuals find the vector of their desires, wants, drives, etc., become part of the Culture Industry. The actual material unfreedom of individuals (vis-a-vis a Marxist analysis of the means of production and labor's exploitation/alienation/reification) passes by unnoticed – as the "negative is sublated."

The key is that the well or reservoir of revolutionary energy (dissatisfaction, frustrated desire, truncated fulfillment, bastardised actualisation of wants, failed cathexis, etc.) which historically has served as the catalyst for revolutionary action no longer exists, as late capitalism has learned to allow for the controlled expression of all desires, whence the experience of frustration (negation) is erased, leading to the seeming appearance of capitalism as an "affirmative" culture – where never faced with denial, negation, or curtailment in their cultural life, the proletariat feels no desire or drive for revolutionary action. Individuals thus pursue instantaneous and non-mediated desire satisfaction which dissipates the energies and drivers of critique and negative thinking. "The world is no longer perceived as hostile" wherein the status quo is perpetuated through the proliferation of comforts, consumerism, and commodification; where the concept of repressive desublimation highlights the desire-production and control dynamics of these processes. Controlled gratification is therein said to produce voluntary compliance and submission, wherein the desire for transcendence is eradicated. This is opposed to prior societies whose social controls banned the access and expression of certain pleasures, leading to their "repression," which was expressed as an antagonism in the life of individuals who were forced to "sublate" their desires into socially acceptable forms.

According to Marcuse, today repression operates through the desublimation of desire, wherein no desires are forced underground, therein eliminating forms of critical distance from society. For examples, see the acceptance of pornography, sex work, drug culture, BDSM, furries, gay culture, lavish living, trans culture, and the like, which are no longer seen by society as negative or pernicious lifestyles. The pursuit of these is now sanctioned and celebrated, meaning being a member of these types of forms of life is no longer a subversive action or lifestyle, but in fact, has been commodified and now perpetuates capital society via the value-form. A negative has been turned into a positive – only operating here at the level of desire-production. This idea was later picked up by Deleuze, Baudrillard, Žižek, and others.

== Subsequent developments ==
Critical exploration of contemporary raunch culture has been usefully linked to the notion of repressive desublimation.

Some postmodernist thinkers, while accepting repressive desublimation as a description of changing social mores, see the ensuing depthlessness of postmodernism as something to be celebrated, not (as with Marcuse) condemned. The advertisement-based system of mass sexualised commodification of the nineties meshed with the conservative, post-political ethos of the times, to create a media-friendly and increasingly pervasive superficial sexuality.

Figures like Slavoj Žižek however have taken up Marcuse's idea in a more critical sense, to explore the postmodern short-circuiting of desire, and effacement of the psychological dimension to sex. Here what has been called the socialisation of the unconscious into mass form of pleasure-drills, and the exercise of control through the command to transgress, rather than to repress, appear as practical instances of repressive desublimation pervading global culture.

== Criticism ==
Marcuse's idea has been criticized for utopianism in seeking to envisage an alternative to the happy consciousness of repressive desublimation that permeates postmodern culture, as well as for modernist elitism in his appeal for critical leverage to an 'autonomous' sphere of high culture.

Foucault expanded the concept into 'hyper-repressive desublimation', and simultaneously criticized it for ignoring the plurality and extent of competing sexual discourses that emerged from the sexual revolution.

== See also ==
- Brave New World
- Circe
- Counterculture of the 1960s
- Double bind
- Lad culture
- Nostalgie de la boue
- Pornotopia
- Repressive tolerance
- Sex addiction
