= Jindřich Zelený =

Czech philosopher and author (1922–1997)

- Born: November 13, 1922
- Died: September 11, 1997 (aged 74)

Education
- Education: Charles University

Jindřich Zelený (13 November 1922 – 11 September 1997) (translation: Henry Green) was a Czech orthodox Marxist-Leninist philosopher and the author of several books.

== Early years ==
He was born in Bítovany in 1922 and attended school in Chrudim and Hradec Králové. In 1948, Zeleny received a Ph.D. in philosophy and sociology from Charles University in Prague.

== Career ==
Zelený taught at Charles University, VŠPHV, University of Economics, and Czechoslovak Academy of Sciences (CSAV) FU. In 1981, he was admitted to the CSAV.

Most of his work is published in Czech. However, The logic of Marx, translated into English and edited by Terrell Carver, was published in 1980. Die Wissenschaftslogik bei Marx und "Das Kapital" was published 1968 in German.

== Later years ==
Zelený retired from teaching in 1990, the year after the Velvet Revolution, and died in Prague in 1997.

== Partial bibliography ==
- Zelený, J. (1980). The logic of Marx. Translated and edited by Terrell Carver. Oxford: Blackwell. ISBN 0-631-10911-0
- Schmidt, A. (1969). Beiträge zur marxistischen Erkenntnistheorie. Aufsätze von György Márkus, Jindřich Zelený, E. W. Iljenkow, Hans-Georg Backhaus, Henri Lefèbvre, Alfred Schmidt. Frankfurt am Main: Suhrkamp.
- Zelený, J. (1968). Die Wissenschaftslogik bei Marx und "Das Kapital". Kritische Studien zur Philosophie. Translated by Peter Bollhagen. Frankfurt am Main [u.a.]: Europäische Verlagsanstalt [u.a.].
