= Soviet Marxism: A Critical Analysis =

1958 book by Herbert Marcuse

- Cover of the first edition
- Author: Herbert Marcuse
- Language: English
- Series: Studies of the Russian Institute
- Subject: Ideology of the Communist Party of the Soviet Union
- Publisher: Columbia University Press
- Publication date: 1958
- Publication place: United States
- Media type: Print (Hardcover and Paperback)
- Pages: 271
- ISBN: 978-0710017918

Soviet Marxism: A Critical Analysis is a 1958 book by the philosopher Herbert Marcuse, in which the author provides a critique of the ideology of the Communist Party of the Soviet Union. It received positive reviews, describing it as a convincing discussion of its subject.

== Summary ==
Soviet Marxism: A Critical Analysis is a book by Herbert Marcuse, published in 1958. In this book, Marcuse examines how the Soviet Union used Marxist ideas. He argues that the Soviet Union changed Marx’s original theories to justify its own power. Marcuse believes that the Soviet version of Marxism turned into a tool for controlling people. It was also used to maintain the government’s power.

Marcuse focuses on how the Soviet government emphasized a method called "dialectical materialism". It looked at how society and nature develop. He argues that this focus made the Soviet view of society too rigid and mechanical. Marcuse also says that the Soviet Union paid less attention to "historical materialism". Marx believed that "historical materialism" is how societies change over time. Marcuse believes that this shift weakened Marx’s original goal of achieving social change. He argues that it made Marxism a way to support the existing state.

The book also talks about how the Soviet government used Marxism as an official ideology to control people’s thoughts and suppress any opposition. Marcuse criticizes the way the government used Marxism to keep the working class from achieving true freedom. In his view, Soviet Marxism failed to bring about the change that Marx had originally hoped for.

This book is important for understanding how Marxist ideas were applied in the Soviet Union and how they were used to maintain a totalitarian state. It shows how political ideologies can be manipulated to serve those in power, which is useful for understanding politics today.

== Background and publication history ==
According to the philosopher Douglas Kellner, Soviet Marxism was based in part on Marcuse's work for the Office of Strategic Services (predecessor of the Central Intelligence Agency) and the State Department after 1945, and the classified intelligence report he wrote. The book was first published in the United States in 1958 by Columbia University Press, as part of the series Studies of the Russian Institute, and in the United Kingdom in 1958 by Routledge & Kegan Paul. In 1985, Columbia University Press reprinted the book with a new introduction by Kellner.

== Reception ==
Soviet Marxism received positive reviews from the Catholic priest John Francis Cronin in the American Catholic Sociological Review and the historian Sidney Monas in the American Sociological Review. The book received a negative review from the professor of government Edward Taborsky in Southwestern Social Science Quarterly.

Cronin described the book as persuasive and challenging, and compared it to the work of Milovan Đilas.

Monas concluded that, "Marcuse brings the best insights of his masters (Hegel, Marx, Freud) to bear on his analysis of Soviet Marxism, and the result is a dense, eloquent, and convincing book, demonstrating that what these masters revealed of human possibilities is not about to be accomplished in the modern world." He noted that Marcuse's analysis of the Soviet Union differed from that of the Marxist writer Isaac Deutscher, and described his "rather bleak" conclusions as contrasting with his previous work Eros and Civilization (1955).

Taborsky argued that Marcuse was mistaken on several important matters related to Soviet communism and had adopted questionable conclusions, such as that faith in the rationality of Soviet indoctrination was "a decisive element in the popular strength of the Soviet regime", that Communist parties independent of the Soviet Union and perhaps even the Communist Party of the Soviet Union itself might develop into social democratic parties, and that it is difficult to find Soviet moral ideas that are not common to western ethics. He argued that these mistakes were the result of Marcuse's belief in the "over-riding rationality" of the Soviet system and similar biases and accused him of suggesting that the totalitarian nature of Soviet communism was caused by the "existence of a competitive Western society".
