= Bítov =

Bítov may refer to places in the Czech Republic:

- Bítov (Nový Jičín District) a municipality and village in the Moravian-Silesian Region
- Bítov (Znojmo District), a municipality and village in the South Moravian Region
  - Bítov Castle in the municipality
- Bítov (Koněprusy), a village and part of Koněprusy in the Central Bohemian Region
- Bítov (Přehýšov), a village and part of Přehýšov in the Plzeň Region
- Bítov (Radenín), a village and part of Radenín in the South Bohemian Region
