= George Katsiaficas =

American historian and social theorist

George Katsiaficas (born 1949, El Paso, Texas) is an American historian and social theorist. He is known for his many writings on social movements, including The Imagination of the New Left: The Global Analysis of 1968 and The Subversion of Politics: European Autonomous Social Movements and the Decolonization of Everyday Life. He was a professor of humanities and sociology at the Wentworth Institute of Technology in Boston from 1985 up to his retirement in 2015. He sits on the editorial board of New Political Science, published by the Caucus for a New Political Science.

== Eros effect ==
After being mentored by Herbert Marcuse (the author of Eros and Civilization), Katsiaficas created the concept of the "eros effect," an analytical tool for explaining mass political awakenings and spontaneous rebellions which sweep through the world in certain time periods. According to this theory, economics and technology alone cannot account for the spread of these movements. Instead, it posits that humanist instincts for liberty and justice are triggered by persistent inequality and explode virally across populations.

Katsiaficas writes that "in moments of eros effect, universal interests become generalized at the same time as the dominant values of society are negated (such as national chauvinism, hierarchy, and individualism)." Other scholars of the theory note that "rebellions in both industrial and preindustrial nations exhibit shared interests in anti-authoritarian self-governance, international solidarity, the transformation of everyday life, and the creation and promotion of alternative values and ethics." Katsiaficas and others have applied this framework to the anti-globalization movement, the "people power" uprisings in Asia in the 1980s (especially the Gwangju Uprising), and the Arab Spring, among other events.
