= The Aesthetic Dimension =

Book by Herbert Marcuse

The Aesthetic Dimension: Towards a Critique of Marxist Aesthetics
- Cover of the first edition
- Author: Herbert Marcuse
- Original title: Die Permanenz der Kunst: Wider eine bestimmte marxistische Ästhetik
- Translator: Herbert Marcuse, Erica Sherover
- Language: German
- Subject: Aesthetics
- Published: 1977 (Carl Hanser Verlag, in German); 1978 (Beacon Press, in English)
- Publication place: Germany
- Media type: Print
- Pages: 88
- ISBN: 0-333-26674-9

The Aesthetic Dimension: Toward a Critique of Marxist Aesthetics (German: Die Permanenz der Kunst: Wider eine bestimmte marxistische Ästhetik) is a 1977 book on aesthetics by the philosopher Herbert Marcuse, in which the author provides an account of modern art's political implications and relationship with society at large.

It is the final major work by Marcuse, a founding member of the Frankfurt School.

== Summary ==
The book is a response to previous writings within critical theory on the subject of art, notably those of Walter Benjamin and Theodor Adorno. Marcuse rejected Benjamin's call in "The Work of Art in the Age of Mechanical Reproduction" for the politicization (i.e., a literal reflection of perceived political realities) of modern, reproducible art both to reflect the state of a society and to incite change. Like both Benjamin and Adorno, Marcuse believed that art promises resistance to societal repression, and that a cultural revolution is necessarily connected to a political or social revolution. Adorno (as represented mainly by his posthumous Aesthetic Theory) and Marcuse agreed that this possibility must be realized through artistic detachment and symbolism. Marcuse however offered a more inclusive and less radical suggestion for modern art's source of power than did Adorno, who believed that the works of high culture were the sole artistic source of potential emancipation.

Marcuse then pointed to what he perceived to be the successes of high culture and translated these to all areas of art. For Marcuse, art's promise of transcendence could only be fulfilled via a conceptual independence from society, but this independence is accessible through a host of media. The successful artist will attain truth in his work through detachment that results in symbolic representation. This successful art must necessarily invoke a longing for something utopian and the promise of ultimate happiness represented by beauty. This symbolic longing for fulfillment will awaken us from complacency.

Marcuse stated in the book's introduction that he considered literature the primary source of his influence for this system, but feels that the ideas would apply to music and visual arts as well. He further stated that "This standard not only allows us to distinguish between "high" and "trivial" literature, opera and operetta, comedy and slapstick, but also between good and bad art within these genres."
