= Bítovany =

- Municipality
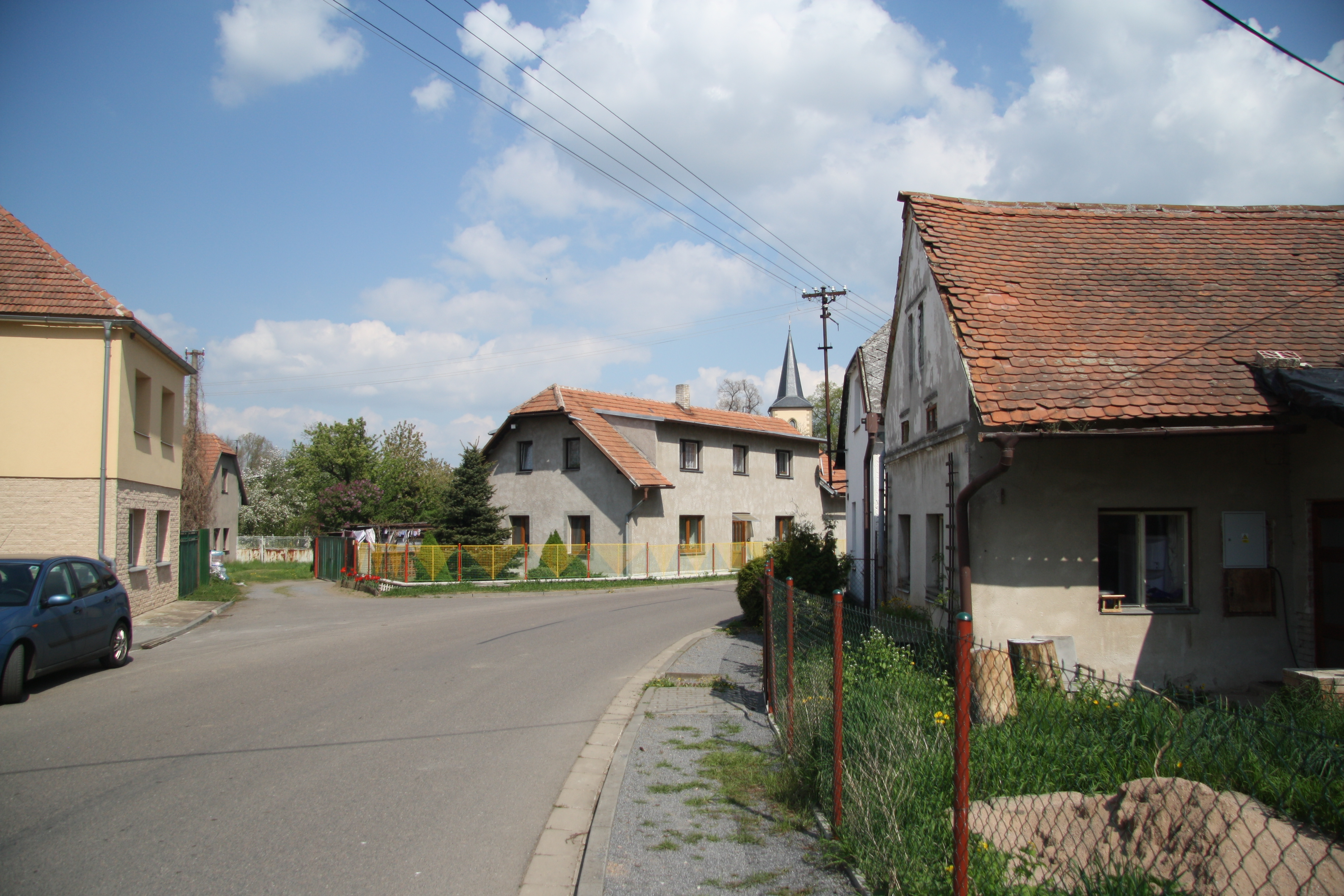
- Centre of Bítovany

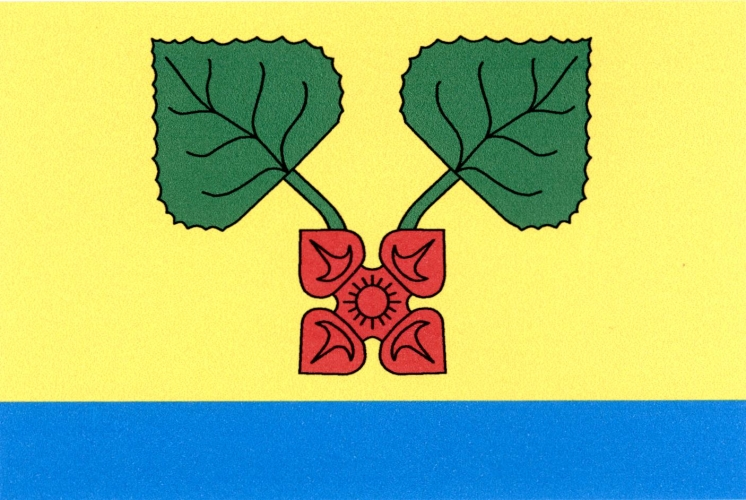
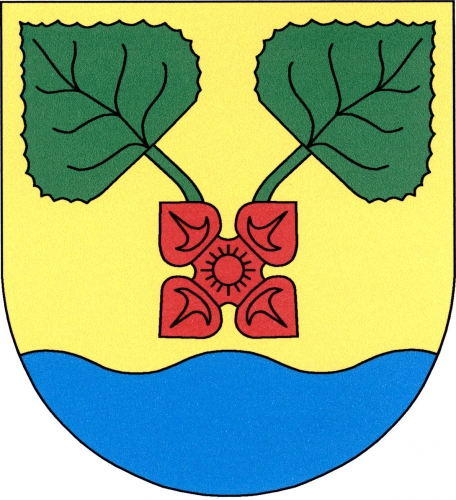
- Flag Coat of arms

- Location in the Czech Republic
- Coordinates: 49°53′50″N 15°51′53″E
- Country: Czech Republic
- Region: Pardubice
- District: Chrudim
- First mentioned: 1347

Area
  - Total: 3.49 km^{2} (1.35 sq mi)
- Elevation: 284 m (932 ft)

Population (2026-01-01)
  - Total: 457
  - Density: 131/km^{2} (339/sq mi)
- Time zone: UTC+1 (CET)
  - Summer (DST): UTC+2 (CEST)
- Postal code: 538 51
- Website: www.bitovany.cz

Bítovany is a municipality and village in Chrudim District in the Pardubice Region of the Czech Republic. It has about 500 inhabitants.

== Administrative division ==
Bítovany consists of two municipal parts (in brackets population according to the 2021 census):

- Bítovany (414)
- Bítovánky (25)

== Etymology ==
The name Bítovany means "the village of people from Bítov". The name of the village of Bítovánky is a diminutive of Bítovany.

== Geography ==
Bítovany is located about 7 kilometres (4 mi) southeast of Chrudim and 16 km (10 mi) south of Pardubice. Almost the entire municipal territory lies in an agricultural landscape in the Svitavy Uplands. The southernmost part extends into the Iron Mountains and includes the highest point of Bítovany at 315 m (1,033 ft) above sea level. The Ležák Stream flows through the municipality. The territory of Bítovany is rich in small fishponds.

== History ==
The first written mention of Bítovany is from 1347.

== Demographics ==
Historical population

Year	Pop.	±%
1869	513	—
1880	596	+16.2%
1890	641	+7.6%
1900	680	+6.1%
1910	716	+5.3%

Year	Pop.	±%
1921	751	+4.9%
1930	690	−8.1%
1950	561	−18.7%
1961	563	+0.4%
1970	502	−10.8%

Year	Pop.	±%
1980	448	−10.8%
1991	415	−7.4%
2001	389	−6.3%
2011	413	+6.2%
2021	439	+6.3%

Source: Censuses

== Transport ==
The railway line Pardubice–Havlíčkův Brod passes through the municipal territory, but there is no train station. Bítovany is served by the station in neighbouring Zaječice.

== Sights ==
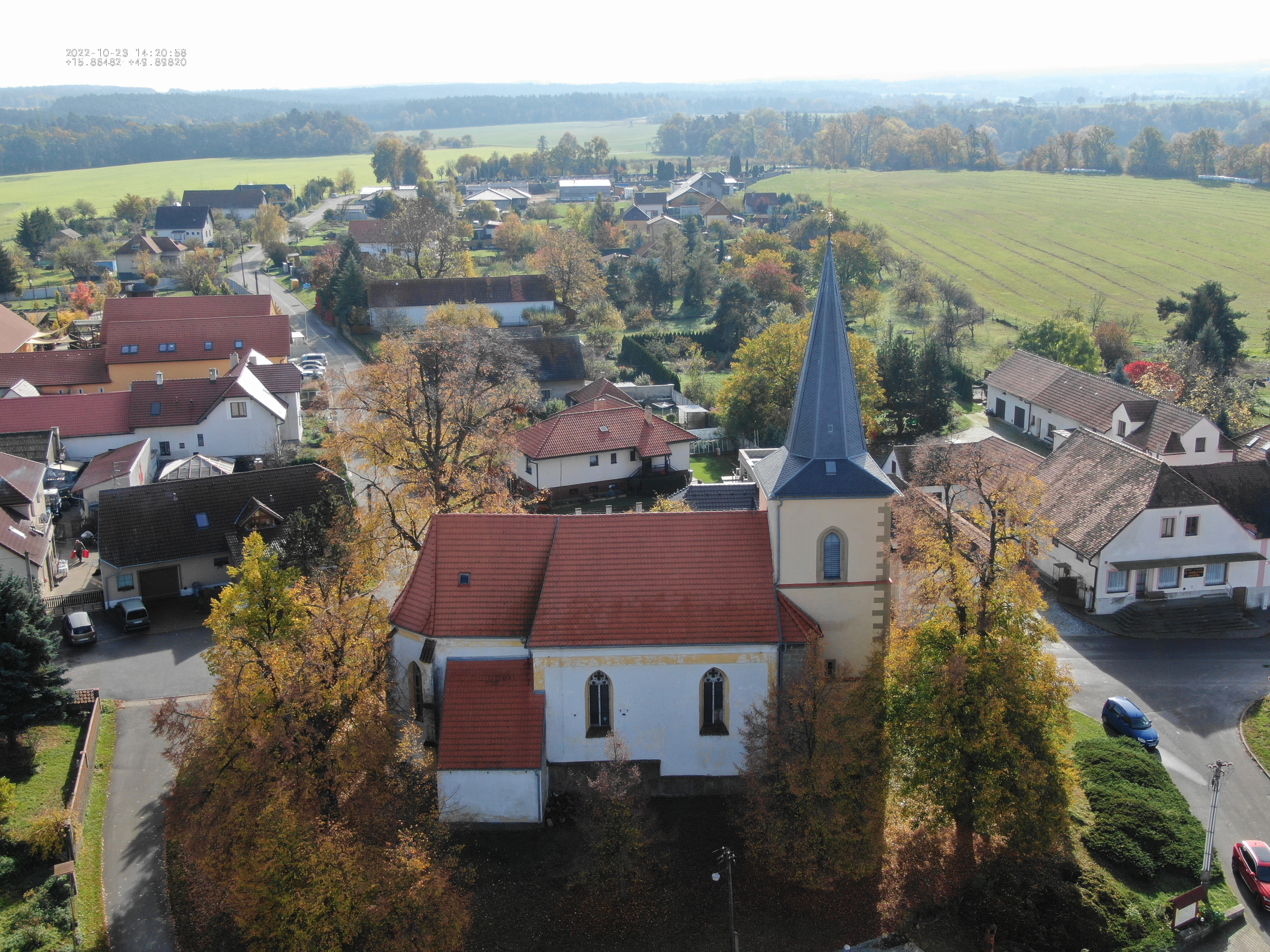
Church of Saint Bartholomew

The main landmark of Bítovany and the oldest building is the Church of Saint Bartholomew. It was first mentioned in 1350 as a Gothic parish church. After 1650, Baroque modifications were made. The current neo-Gothic appearance dates from 1883.
