= An Essay on Liberation =

1969 book by Herbert Marcuse

- Cover of the first edition
- Author: Herbert Marcuse
- Language: English
- Subject: Industrial society
- Publisher: Beacon Press
- Publication date: 1969
- Publication place: United States
- Media type: Print (Hardcover and Paperback)
- Pages: 91
- ISBN: 0-8070-0595-9

An Essay on Liberation is a 1969 book by the Frankfurt School philosopher Herbert Marcuse.

== Summary ==
The author of One-Dimensional Man argues that the time for utopian speculation has come. Marcuse argues that advanced industrial society has rendered the traditional conception of human freedom obsolete, and outlines new possibilities for contemporary human liberation "from each according to his ability, to each according to his needs".

== Publication history ==
An Essay on Liberation was first published by Beacon Press in 1969.

== Reception ==
The author Brian Easlea writes that Marcuse, having in the past been attacked by Marxists for his "quite unambiguous indictment of science and perhaps feeling that he had directed too much attention away from the rulers of advanced industrial society", apparently "reversed direction" in An Essay on Liberation by endorsing science and technology as "great vehicles of liberation".
