= Harold Marcuse =

American historian of Europe

Harold Marcuse (born 1957 in Waterbury, Connecticut) is an American professor of modern and contemporary German history and public history. He teaches at the University of California, Santa Barbara. He is the grandson of philosopher Herbert Marcuse.

== Education ==
Marcuse majored in physics at Wesleyan University (B.A. 1979, magna cum laude) in Middletown, Connecticut. He earned an M.A. in art history from the University of Hamburg in 1987, with a thesis about a 1949 memorial dedicated "to the Victims of National Socialist Persecution and the Resistance Struggle".

In 1985, Marcuse co-produced a photographic exhibition on monuments and memorials commemorating events of the Nazi and World War II periods. In 1986, he entered the Ph.D. program at the University of Michigan, Ann Arbor, to write a dissertation about the post-1945 history of the (former) Dachau concentration camp that examined the legacies of Dachau. Marcuse says that since the end of World War II, much art, literature and public debate in Germany have revolved around the issues of resistance, collaboration and complicity with the Third Reich.

== Career ==
Marcuse began teaching history at UC Santa Barbara in 1992. Marcuse's courses focus on German history, genocide studies, and historical memory.His study of the different ways Germans memorialized events under Hitler's rule led him to research the broader question of what people get out of learning about historical events. He examines the ways historical events have been portrayed over time, and the meanings various groups of people have derived from those events and portrayals. Marcuse was instrumental in connecting a student, Collette Waddell, with a Polish Holocaust survivor, Nina Morecki, which led to a book about the Holocaust that discussed not just the era, but how survivors pursued their lives afterward. Marcuse has stated that his interest in history education also resulted in him becoming active in the reform of UC Santa Barbara's General Education requirements between 1997 and 2004.

He is also interested in the use of technology, such as videorecording and the Internet in history education; the use of oral history in social studies teaching; and questions of public conceptions of history, often referred to as "collective memory." He serves as webmaster of the Marcuse family's website.

== Personal ==
Marcuse and his first wife (m. 1987–2010) had two children, Aaron (born 1988) and Miriam (born 1993). On the family website, Marcuse states that he and his first wife separated in 2001 and divorced in 2010. He married again in 2012. He is the grandson of German critical theorist and philosopher Herbert Marcuse, his father being Herbert's son Peter Marcuse.

In 2012, Marcuse stated that his interests were "history education and public exposure to history (monuments, museums, school curricula, films, ...)." This in turn led him to study the effects of the No Child Left Behind Act on his local school system from 2004 to 2008. Since 2002 he has worked to reform the University of California, Santa Barbara General Education Curriculum.

== Books and selected publications ==
- Harold Marcuse, Frank Schimmelfennig and Jochen Spielmann (1985). Steine des Anstosses: Nationalsozialismus und Zweiter Weltkrieg in Denkmalen, 1945–1985. Museum for the History of Hamburg.
- Harold Marcuse (1990). "Das ehemalige Konzentrationslager Dachau: Der mühevolle Weg zur Gedenkstätte, 1945-1968," in: Dachauer Hefte 6(1990), 182–205.
- Harold Marcuse (1993). "Die Museale Darstellung des Holocaust an Orten der ehemaligen Konzentrationslager in der Bundesrepublik, 1945-1990." In: Erinnerung: Zur Gegenwart des Holocaust in Deutschland West und Deutschland Ost (Frankfurt: Haag and Herchen), 79–98.
- Harold Marcuse (1998). "The Revival of Holocaust Awareness in West Germany, Israel, and the United States." In: Carole Fink, Philipp Gassert, Detlef Junker (eds.), 1968: The World Transformed (New York: Cambridge University Press), 421–38.
- Harold Marcuse (1999). "Dachau: The Political Aesthetics of Holocaust Memorials," in: Peter Hayes (ed.), Lessons and Legacies III: Memory, Memorialization, and Denial (Evanston, IL: Northwestern Univ. Press, 1999), 138–168, 278–287.
- Harold Marcuse (2000). "Experiencing the Jewish Holocaust in Los Angeles: The Beit Hashoah--Museum of Tolerance," on-line journal Other Voices, 2:1(2000).
- Harold Marcuse (2001). Legacies of Dachau: The Uses and Abuses of a Concentration Camp, 1933–2001. Cambridge University Press. ISBN 0-521-55204-4.
- "Die vernachlässigten Massengräber: Der Skandal um dem Leitenberg, 1949–50," Dachauer Hefte 19(2003), 3–23.
- "Memories of the World War II and the Holocaust in Europe," in: Gordon Martel (ed.), A Companion to Europe, 1900–1945 (Oxford: Blackwell, 2006), pp. 487–503.
- "Holocaust Memorials: The Emergence of a Genre," American Historical Review, 115:1(Feb. 2010), pp. 53–89.
- "The Afterlife of the Camps," in: Jane Caplan and Nikolaus Wachsmann (eds.), Concentration Camps in Nazi Germany: The New Histories (New York: Routledge, 2010), pp. 186–211.
- "Memorializing Persecuted Jews in Dachau and Other West German Concentration Camp Memorial Sites," in: William Niven and Chloe Paver (eds.), Memorialization in Germany since 1945 (New York: Palgrave Macmillan, 2010), 192–204.
- "Nicht Rekonstruieren, sondern Rezeptionsspuren sichtbar werden lassen: Thesen zur Gestaltung der Überreste des Kräutergartens," in: Gabriele Hammermann and Dirk Riedel (eds.), Sanierung – Rekonstruktion – Neugestaltung: Zum Umgang mit historischen Bauten in Gedenkstätten (Göttingen: Wallstein, 2014), 50–64.
- "The Origin and Reception of Martin Niemöller's Quotation 'First They Came for the Communists...'," Yard sign in North Carolina, First came for immigrantsin: Michael Berenbaum et al (eds.), Remembering for the Future: Armenia, Auschwitz, and Beyond (Paragon, 2016), 173–199.
- "The Political Without the Personal," [Scholars Forum: Thomas Weber's Becoming Hitler: The Making of a Nazi] In: Dapim: Studies on the Holocaust 32:2(2018), 130–137.

== See also ==
- First they came ... (quotation by Martin Niemöller, theologian)
- Reception history
