= Hasker and Marcuse Factory =

- U.S. National Register of Historic Places
- Virginia Landmarks Register
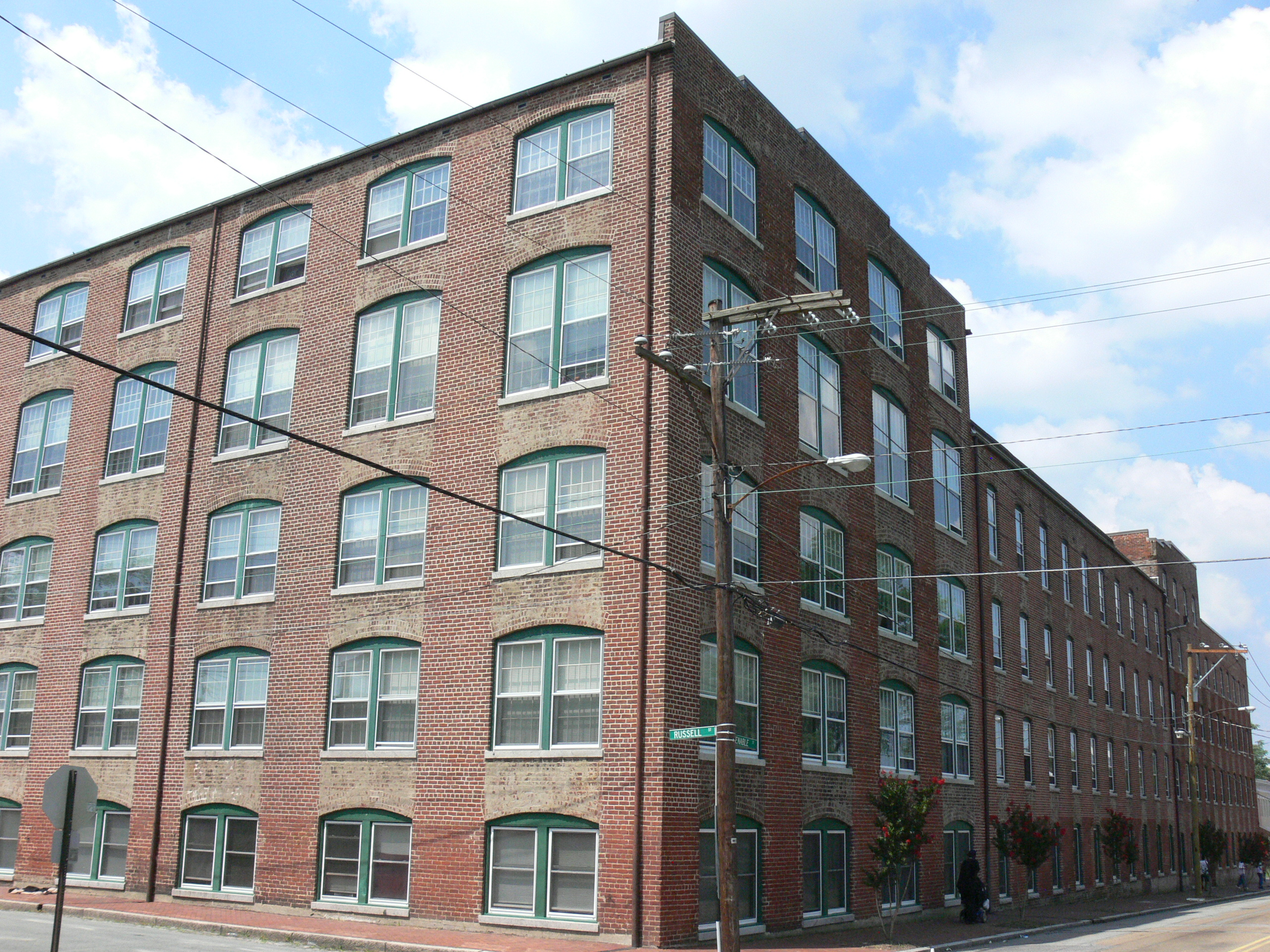
- Hasker and Marcuse Factory, July 2011

- Location within Virginia Location within the United States
- Location: 2401-2413 Venable St., Richmond, Virginia
- Coordinates: 37°32′17″N 77°24′52″W
- Area: less than one acre
- Built: 1893
- NRHP reference No.: 83003303
- VLR No.: 127-0299

Significant dates
- Added to NRHP: August 11, 1983
- Designated VLR: April 19, 1983

Hasker and Marcuse Factory, originally part of the American Can Company, is a historic factory building located in Richmond, Virginia. The original section was built in 1893 and expanded through 1915. It is a four- to five-story, brick industrial building. The factory housed manufacturers of printed, polychromatic tin boxes and tin tags (labels) for plugs of chewing tobacco.

It was listed on the National Register of Historic Places in 1983. It is now the Church Hill House Apartments.
