= Technological rationality =

Philosophical idea

Technological rationality or technical rationality posits that rational decisions to incorporate technological advances into society can, once the technology is ubiquitous, change what is considered rational within that society.

The philosophical idea was first postulated by the Frankfurt School philosopher Herbert Marcuse in his 1941 article "Some Social Implications of Modern Technology," published first in the journal Studies in Philosophy and Social Sciences, Vol. IX. It gained mainstream repute and a more holistic treatment in his 1964 book One-Dimensional Man.

== Overview ==
Marcuse writes that technological progress has the potential to free humanity from its requirement to labor for survival. Freedom from labor is true freedom for humanity, and this freedom from labor can be achieved from technological rationality. But instead of embracing this freedom, humanity has been subsumed by a new system of reason rooted in technological innovation. This new rationality, technological rationality, encompasses all elements of life and replaces political rationality.

Under this new system, technology and industry control the structure of the economy, intellectual pursuits, and leisure activities. False needs, which are defined by Marcuse as needs created by technological rationality, become inseparable from true needs, which are needs that are life sustaining. Reason in its pre-technological form collapses as opposition to the norms of technological society is denied under the new system of rationality. Complacency within the status quo replaces reason as people grow content with the better life offered by technology. This contentment and the subsequent loss of opposition makes humanity one-dimensional, which in turn makes humanity less free than before the onset of technological rationality. In this way technological rationality becomes totalitarian.

== Effects of technological rationality ==
Because of the totalitarian nature of technological rationality, Marcuse demonstrates in One-Dimensional Man the various ways that technological rationality has changed various facets of life.

=== Labor ===
Technology, rather than freeing the proletariat class, has instead entrenched their enslavement to the classist system. The worker no longer has to labor with the same intensity due to mechanization, and this decreases the laborers feelings of enslavement. The ratio of white collar to blue collar workers increases as fewer workers are needed to produce goods. Progress has created a "technological veil" between the worker and his or her work, and the distinction between blue collar and white collar workers breaks down as technology reduces the labor gap between the blue collar and white collar worker. The worker associates himself or herself more strongly with the factory rather than his or her class, and the factory owners become "bureaucrats in a corporate machine." The Master-Slave relationship between worker and factory owner no longer exists, and the factory owner loses his or her power. Under technological rationality, the technicians and scientists become the new authority.

=== Government ===
Under technological rationality, the Welfare State rises in both need and prominence. Increased productivity, the rational goal under technological rationality, requires planning on the scale that only the Welfare State can provide. This new Welfare State is less free. It requires the restriction of leisure time, the availability of goods and services, and the cognitive ability to understand and desire self-realization. Yet as long as one's quality of life is improved under the new state as compared to the previous one, the people will not revolt.

This society is driven to increase production by fear of the Enemy, which causes the state to exist constantly as a "defense society". The Enemy can take the form of an idealized pure communism or pure capitalism. This Enemy does not truly exist, but its constant feared presence drives the society to greater productivity.

=== Art ===
Under technological rationality, high art has desublimated. Culture and social reality have flattened from two dimensions into one. Artistic alienation, which inspired the artistic works of the past, has disappeared due to this flattening. The high culture before technological rationality no longer makes sense to the modern onlooker. Art under technological rationality instead becomes common and mass-produced. This mass-produced art is integrated into everyday life, thus fully removing the distinction between high culture and social reality.

== Responses to technological rationality ==
Over 300,000 copies of the first-edition of One-Dimensional Man were sold. The book was a New York Times bestseller and launched Marcuse's career as a leftist public intellectual. His conception of technological rationality and its negative societal consequences were a direct critique to the industrial capitalist society of the time. This critique was incorporated into the ideology of the New Left that rose in the 1960s. Many politicians on the right, such as Ronald Reagan and William F. Buckley, and philosophers, such as Alasdair MacIntyre, attacked Marcuse's idea of technological rationality. Marcuse received death threats, and Brandeis and the University of California system attempted to fire him from his teaching positions due to One-Dimensional Man.

Ultimately, the conception of technological rationality and Marcuse's book One-Dimensional Man fell out of favor with the left in the 1990s. A small uptick in interest did resurface when One-Dimensional Man reached its fiftieth anniversary of publication in 2014.

== See also ==
- Communicative rationality
