= Peter Marcuse =

German-American lawyer and professor (1928–2022)

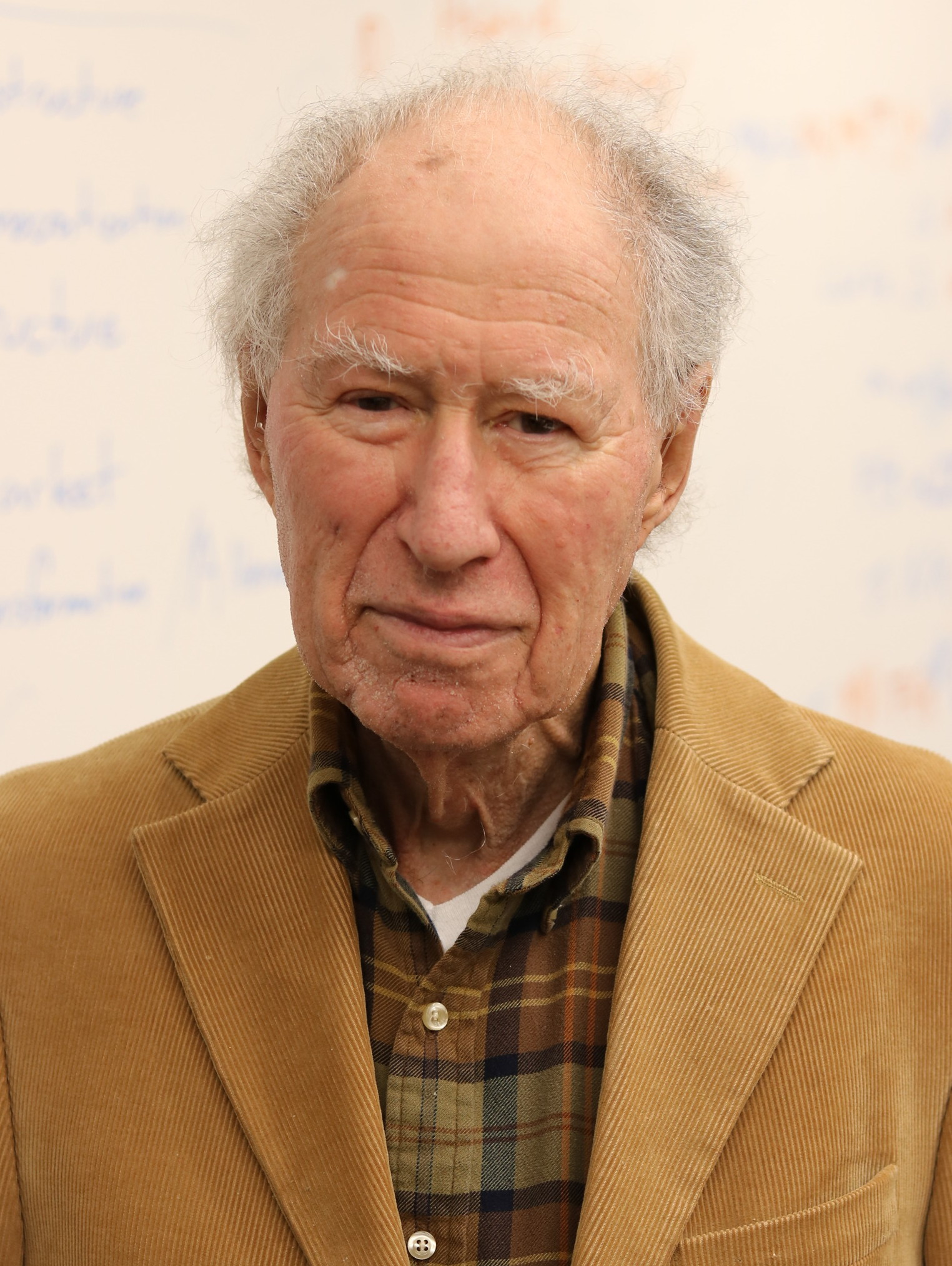
- Marcuse at the Massachusetts Institute of Technology, 2017
- Born: November 13, 1928; Berlin, Prussia, Germany
- Died: March 4, 2022 (aged 93); Santa Barbara, California, U.S.
- Occupations: scholar, lawyer, urban planner
- Title: Harvey Perloff Professor of Planning, University of California at Los Angeles; Professor of Urban Planning, Columbia University

Academic background
- Education: JD, Ph.D.
- Alma mater: University of California, Berkeley
- Thesis: Home Ownership Programs for Lower Income Families: Legal and Financial Implications (1972)

Academic work
- Discipline: Lawyer, urban planner
- Institutions: University of California, Los Angeles, Columbia University
- Website: marcuse.org/peter/peter.htm

Peter Marcuse (November 13, 1928 – March 4, 2022) was a German-born American lawyer and professor of urban planning.

== Early life and education ==
Marcuse was the older son of Sophie Wertheim and philosopher and critical theorist Herbert Marcuse. He was born in Berlin, in a highly assimilated Ashkenazi family, and left Germany shortly after Hitler came to power, immigrating to the U.S. in 1934.

Marcuse obtained a JD from Yale Law School in 1952. He earned master's degrees from Columbia in public law and government in 1963 and from Yale in urban studies in 1968. He completed a PhD at UC Berkeley in city and regional planning in 1972 with a thesis on the legal and financial implications of home ownership for low income families.

== Career ==
Marcuse began his career as a lawyer in New Haven and Waterbury, Connecticut, where he served as majority leader of the board of aldermen from 1959 to 1963. In July 1964 he participated in the Freedom Summer in Mississippi, publishing a series of articles about his experience there. He was a member of the Waterbury City Plan Commission from 1964 to 1968.

Marcuse was a professor of urban planning at UCLA from 1972 to 1975, then at Columbia University from 1975 to 2003. He wrote extensively on gentrification, various forms of ghettoization (imposed ghettos, "enclaves," and "citadels"), the right to the city and the Occupy movement.

=== Views on public transit ===
While a Los Angeles City planning commissioner and professor at UCLA, Marcuse strongly opposed proposals in the 1970s to build a rail transit system in Los Angeles. He argued in 1974 that rail transit primarily benefitted the middle-class and wealthy real estate owners, promoted sprawl, and was funded by regressive sales taxes. The office of Los Angeles Mayor Tom Bradley, a strong proponent of a rail system in Los Angeles, considered Marcuse's public criticisms of the mayor's proposals to be damaging.

=== Views on housing ===
In 2008, Marcuse criticized New York City Mayor Michael Bloomberg's PlaNYC, a strategic plan to prepare New York City for one million more residents by expanding housing, enacting congestion pricing, repairing infrastructure, and reducing greenhouse gas emissions. Marcuse called the process of participation a "sham", and said the plan focused narrowly on infrastructure and environmental threats without comprehensively evaluating the city's economic and racial inequalities.

In the 2016 book In Defense of Housing (co-authored with David Madden), Marcuse argues that zoning changes and policy changes cannot solve the housing crisis unless housing is de-commodified and removed from the market entirely.

== Personal life ==
Marcuse had three children with his wife, Frances (née Bessler): novelist Irene Marcuse, UC Santa Barbara history professor Harold Marcuse, and Andrew Marcuse. He died on March 4, 2022, at the age of 93.

== Books and publications ==
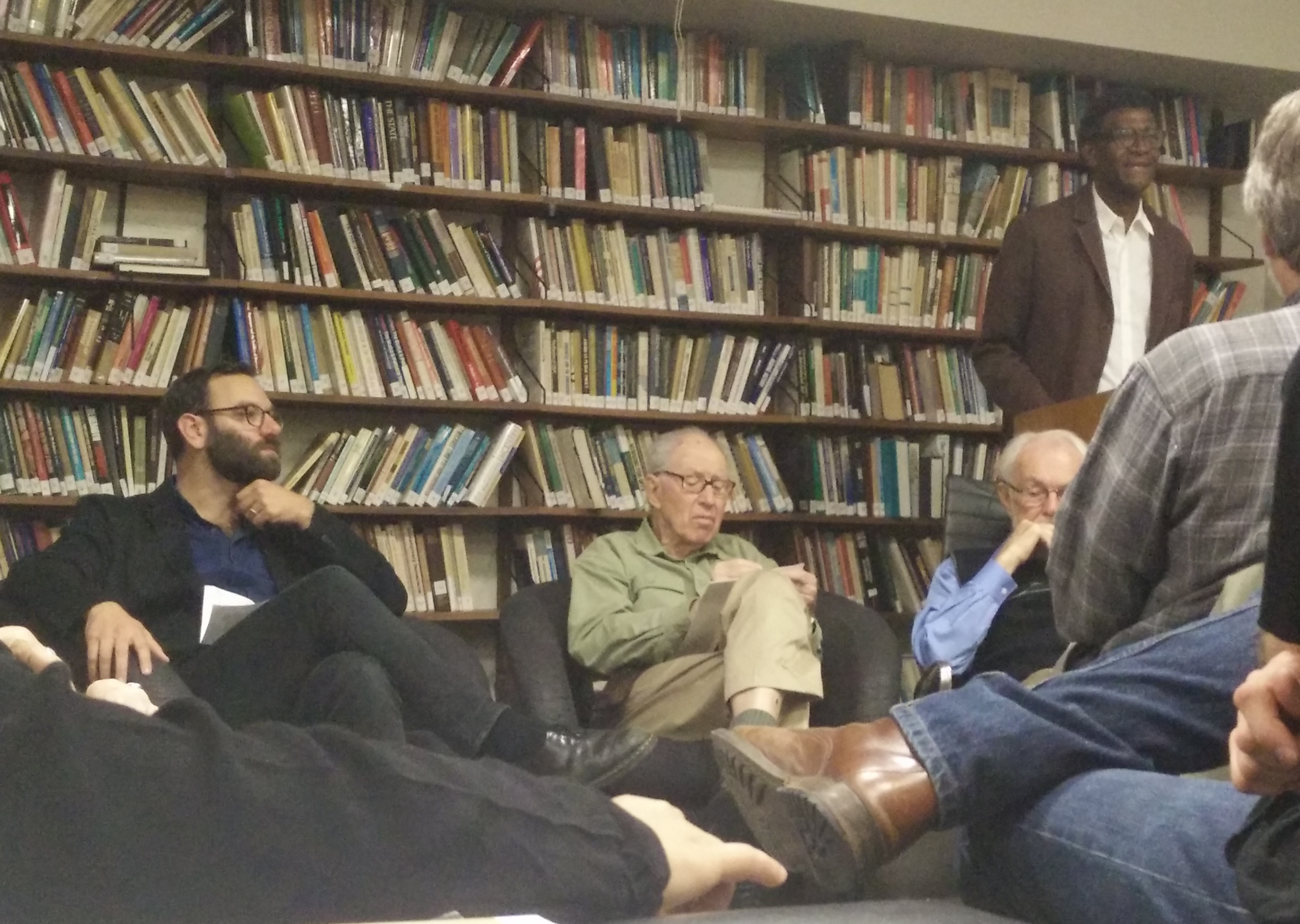
David Madden, Peter Marcuse (center), David Harvey, and Gregory Baggett at The Graduate Center, CUNY for the In Defense of Housing book launch.

- Missing Marx: A Personal and Political Journal of a Year in East Germany, 1989-1990. Monthly Review Press. 1991. ISBN 0853458278.
- Of States and Cities: The Partitioning of Urban Space. Oxford University Press. 2002. ISBN 019829719X.
- with James Connolly, Johannes Novy, Ingrid Olivo, Cuz Potter, Justin Steil, Searching for the Just City: Debates in Urban Theory and Practice. Routledge 2009. ISBN 978-0415687614
- with Neil Brenner and Margit Mayer, Cities for People Not for Profit: Critical Urban Theory and the Right to the City. Taylor and Francis. 2011.
- Madden, David; Marcuse, Peter (2016). In Defense of Housing: The Politics of Crisis. Verso Books. ISBN 9781784783549.
- "From Utopian and Realistic to Transformative Planning," in: Beatrix Haselsberger, ed. Encounters in Planning Thought: 16 Autobiographical Essays from Key Thinkers in Spatial Planning (Routledge, 2017), pp 35–50.
- "From Gerrymandering to Co-Mandering: Redrawing the Lines," in: Andrea Kahn and Carol J. Burns (eds.), Site Matters: Strategies for Uncertainty through Planning and Design (New York: Routledge, 2020), pp. 252–266.
- "From Gerrymandering to "Social Mandering", Progressive City Newsletter, June 2021, https://www.progressivecity.net/single-post/from-gerrymandering-to-social-mandering
