= Irene Marcuse =

American author of mystery novels

- Education: Columbia University (BA, MSW)
- Occupation: Author
- Parent: Peter Marcuse (father)
- Relatives: Herbert Marcuse (grandfather)
- Writing career
- Genre: Mystery fiction
- Website: www.marcuse.org/irene/

Irene Marcuse was an American author of mystery novels. She was a finalist for the Agatha Award in 2000. She died March 8, 2021.

Marcuse held a BA in Literature and Creative Writing and a Master of Social Work from Columbia University. She was the granddaughter of social philosopher Herbert Marcuse and daughter of his only child Peter Marcuse.

== Books ==
Marcuse's Anita Servi series includes:

- The Death of an Amiable Child (2000)
- Guilty Mind (2001)
- Consider the Alternative (2002)
- Under the Manhattan Bridge (2004)

Her book Under the Manhattan Bridge is set in October 2001, in a city still coping with the impact of 9/11. According to a review in The New York Times of post-9/11 mystery novels, it features "garbage trucks used as barricades and surreally polite New Yorkers."
