= Přehýšov =

- Municipality
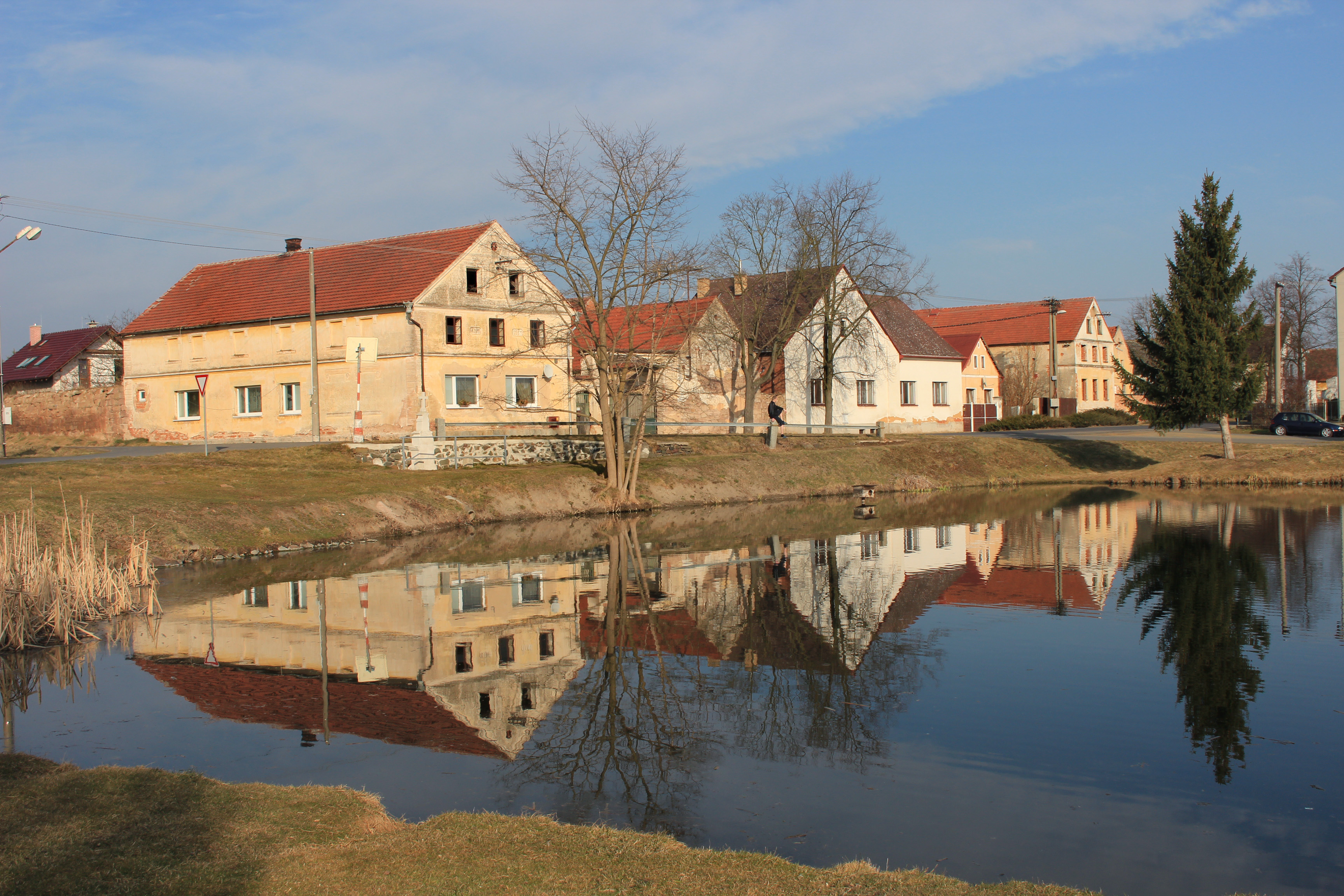
- Centre of Přehýšov

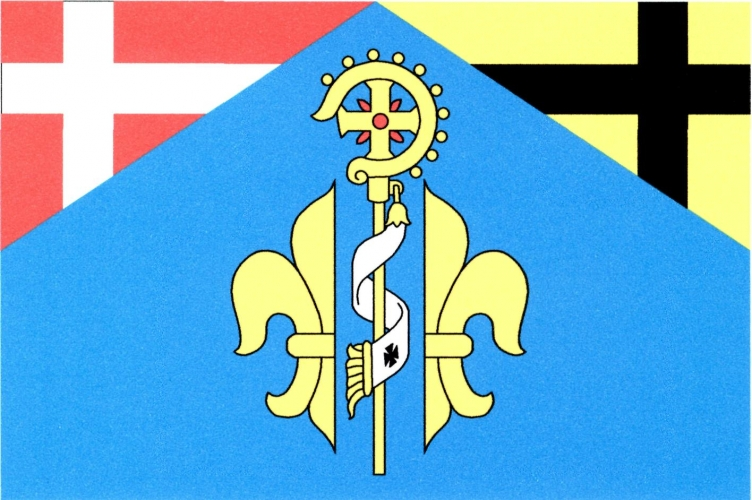
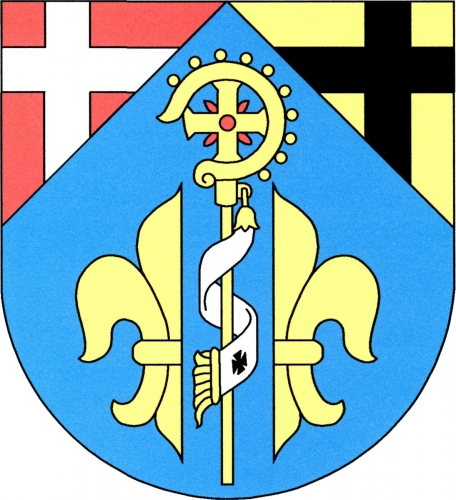
- Flag Coat of arms

- Location in the Czech Republic
- Coordinates: 49°42′10″N 13°7′37″E
- Country: Czech Republic
- Region: Plzeň
- District: Plzeň-North
- First mentioned: 1248

Area
  - Total: 17.28 km^{2} (6.67 sq mi)
- Elevation: 371 m (1,217 ft)

Population (2026-01-01)
  - Total: 592
  - Density: 34.3/km^{2} (88.7/sq mi)
- Time zone: UTC+1 (CET)
  - Summer (DST): UTC+2 (CEST)
- Postal code: 330 23
- Website: www.prehysov.cz

Přehýšov is a municipality and village in Plzeň-North District in the Plzeň Region of the Czech Republic. It has about 600 inhabitants.

Přehýšov lies approximately 18 kilometres (11 mi) west of Plzeň and 102 km (63 mi) south-west of Prague.

== Administrative division ==
Přehýšov consists of three municipal parts (in brackets population according to the 2021 census):

- Přehýšov (401)
- Bítov (56)
- Radějovice (53)

== Demographics ==
Historical population
Year	Pop.	±%
1869	949	—
1880	1,178	+24.1%
1890	1,330	+12.9%
1900	1,290	−3.0%
1910	1,300	+0.8%
1921	1,369	+5.3%
1930	1,334	−2.6%
1950	844	−36.7%
1961	688	−18.5%
1970	590	−14.2%
1980	495	−16.1%
1991	397	−19.8%
2001	557	+40.3%
2011	414	−25.7%
2021	510	+23.2%
Source: Censuses
