= A Critique of Pure Tolerance =

1965 book by Robert Paul Wolff, Barrington Moore Jr., and Herbert Marcuse

- Cover of the first edition
- Authors: Robert Paul Wolff, Barrington Moore Jr., Herbert Marcuse
- Language: English
- Subjects: Tolerance; Freedom of speech
- Publisher: Beacon Press
- Publication date: 1965
- Publication place: United States
- Media type: Print (Hardcover and Paperback)
- Pages: 123
- ISBN: 978-0807015599

A Critique of Pure Tolerance is a 1965 book by the philosopher Robert Paul Wolff, the sociologist Barrington Moore Jr., and the philosopher Herbert Marcuse, in which the authors discuss the political role of tolerance.

== Summary ==
The book has three main parts: "Beyond Tolerance" by Robert Paul Wolff, "Tolerance and the Scientific Outlook" by Barrington Moore Jr., and "Repressive Tolerance" by Herbert Marcuse. It also includes a foreword jointly written by its authors.

The authors explain that the book's title refers to the philosopher Immanuel Kant's Critique of Pure Reason (1781), and suggest that their ideas may resemble those of Kant. They note that they have different perspectives on philosophy, with Wolff accepting, and Marcuse opposing, the approach of analytic philosophy, and Moore being critical of philosophy in general. They write that the purpose of the book is to discuss the political role of tolerance and that despite their disagreements with each other they believe that "the prevailing theory and practice of tolerance" is hypocritical and conceals "appalling political realities."

Wolff argues that tolerance should be studied "by means of an analysis of the theory and practice of democratic pluralism."

Marcuse argues that "the realization of the objective of tolerance" requires "intolerance toward prevailing policies, attitudes, opinions, and the extension of tolerance to policies, attitudes, and opinions which are outlawed or suppressed." He makes the case for "liberating tolerance", which would consist of intolerance to right-wing movements and toleration of left-wing movements.

== Publication history ==
A Critique of Pure Tolerance was first published by Beacon Press in 1965. In 1969, it was published as a Beacon Paperback.

== Reception ==
A Critique of Pure Tolerance received a negative review from the sociologist Nathan Glazer in the American Sociological Review. The book was also reviewed by the philosopher John Herman Randall Jr. in The Journal of Philosophy and L. Del Grosso Destreri in Studi di Sociologia.

Glazer described the book as "peculiar". He credited Marcuse with being open in his advocacy of intolerance, but accused Wolff of being incapable of distinguishing "facts from theory" in his criticisms of tolerance and pluralist democracy. He disagreed with Wolff's view that "The application of the theory of pluralism always favors the groups in existence against those in formation", maintaining that it was contradicted by many historical examples, including the civil rights movement of the 1950s, and described his views as "politically naive." He accused Moore of advocating violence, and wrote that Marcuse appeared to support measures such as breaking up meetings and destroying the literature of his opponents. He considered it fortunate that "the means by which he might impose his opinions are not terribly impressive."

In 1970, the philosopher Maurice Cranston called A Critique of Pure Tolerance Marcuse's most popular and disturbing work to date. Cranston commented that it was published, "in a peculiar format, bound in black like a prayer book or missal and perhaps designed to compete with The Thoughts of Chairman Mao as devotional reading at student sit-ins." The philosopher Alasdair MacIntyre argued that Marcuse's theory of the right of revolutionary minorities to suppress opinions is both false and could potentially become "an effective barrier to any rational progress and liberation". He accused Marcuse of having "taken over from liberal and right-wing critics of the European revolutionary tradition a theory which they falsely ascribed to the left, but which was rarely held until Marcuse espoused it." Against Marcuse, he argued that the proper end of tolerance is not truth but rationality, and that Marcuse's proposals undermined the possibility of rationality and critical discussion. He stated that Marcuse's case against tolerance made those radicals who espouse it "allies of the very forces which they claim to attack." The political scientist Ronald Bayer identified Marcuse's arguments about "repressive tolerance" as an influence on gay rights activists, who disrupted lectures by psychiatrists and refused to tolerate the views of their opponents as they campaigned for homosexuality to be declassified as a mental disorder.

== See also ==
- Paradox of tolerance
- Tyranny of the majority

== Bibliography ==
Books

- Bayer, Ronald (1987). Homosexuality and American Psychiatry: The Politics of Diagnosis. Princeton: Princeton University Press. ISBN 0-691-02837-0.
- Cranston, Maurice (1970). "Foreword". In Cranston, Maurice (ed.). The New Left. London: The Bodley Head. ISBN 0-37000397-7.
- MacIntyre, Alasdair (1970). Marcuse. London: Fontana.
- Marcuse, Herbert (1969). "Repressive Tolerance". A Critique of Pure Tolerance. Boston: Beacon Press.
- ——— (2003) [1965]. Marcuse, Harold (ed.). "Repressive tolerance". Herbert Marcuse official homepage.
- Moore, Barrington (1969). "Tolerance and the Scientific Outlook". A Critique of Pure Tolerance. Boston: Beacon Press.
- Wolff, Robert Paul (1969). "Beyond Tolerance". A Critique of Pure Tolerance. Boston: Beacon Press.
- ———; Moore, Barrington; Marcuse, Herbert (1969). "Foreword". A Critique of Pure Tolerance. Boston: Beacon Press.

Journals

- Del Grosso Destreri, L. (1968). "Review of A Critique of Pure Tolerance". Studi di Sociologia. 6 (1).
- Glazer, Nathan (1966). "Review of A Critique of Pure Tolerance". American Sociological Review. 31 (3). doi:10.2307/2090833. JSTOR 2090833.
- Randall, John Herman (1966). "Review of A Critique of Pure Tolerance". The Journal of Philosophy. 63 (16): 457–65. doi:10.2307/2024137. JSTOR 2024137.
