= Eros and Civilization =

1955 book by Herbert Marcuse

Eros and Civilization: A Philosophical Inquiry into Freud
- Cover of the first edition
- Author: Herbert Marcuse
- Language: English
- Subject: Sigmund Freud
- Publisher: Beacon Press
- Publication date: 1955
- Publication place: United States
- Media type: Print (hardcover and paperback)
- Pages: 277 (Beacon Press paperback edition)
- ISBN: 0-8070-1555-5

Eros and Civilization: A Philosophical Inquiry into Freud (1955; second edition, 1966) is a book by the German philosopher and social critic Herbert Marcuse.

== See also ==
- Eros effect
- Eros (Freud)
- Freudo-Marxism
- Libidinal Economy
