= Alfred Schmidt (philosopher) =

German philosopher (1931–2012)

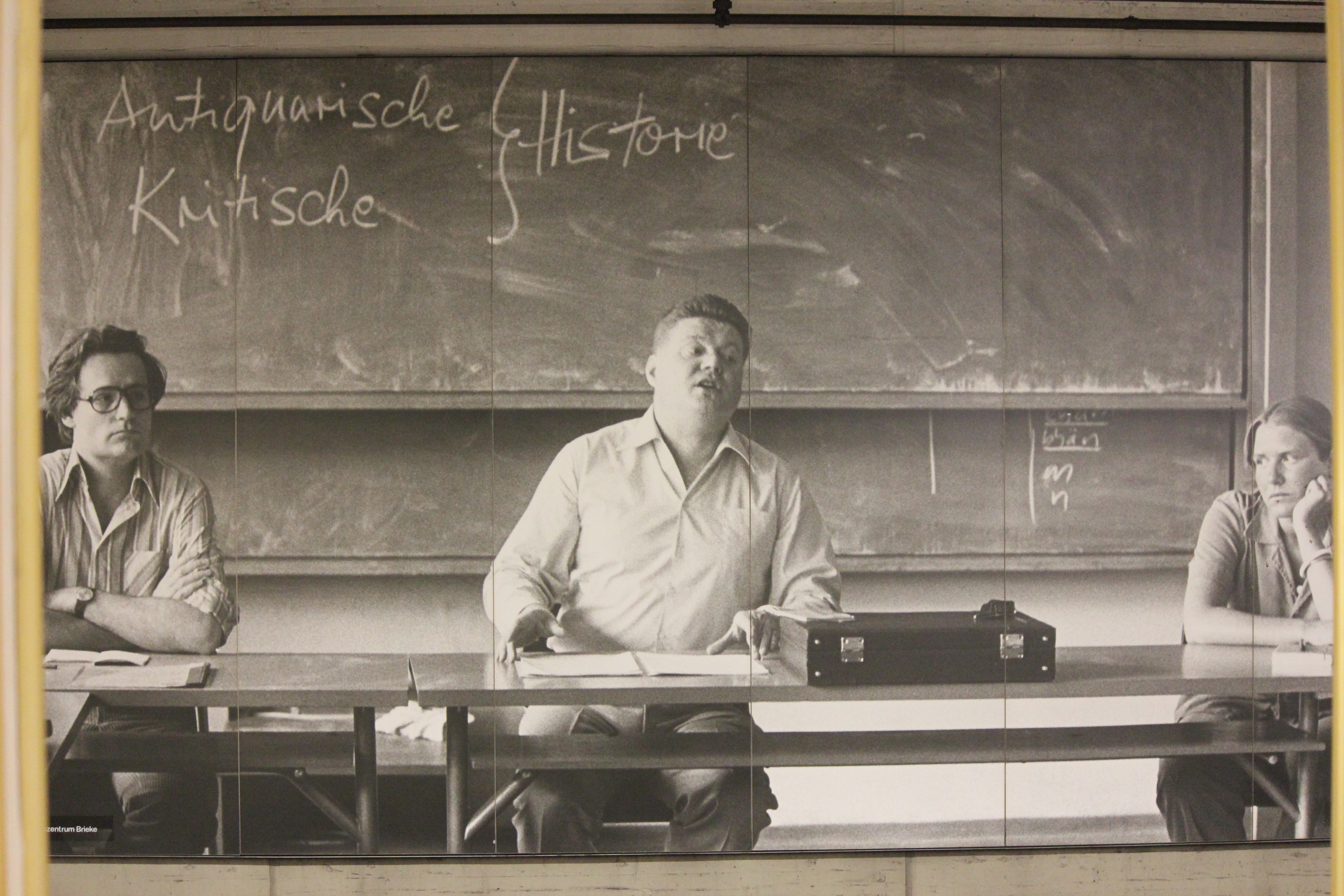
Train station poster in Frankfurt U-Bahn with Alfred Schmidt.

Alfred Schmidt (/ʃmɪt/; German: [ʃmɪt]; born 19 May 1931, Berlin – 28 August 2012, Frankfurt am Main) was a German philosopher.

== Biography ==
Schmidt studied history and English as well as classical philology at the Goethe University Frankfurt and later philosophy and sociology. He was a student of Theodor W. Adorno and Max Horkheimer and gained his doctorate with his The Concept of Nature in Marx.

Schmidt was professor of philosophy and sociology at the University of Frankfurt from 1972 and was made emeritus in 1999. Schmidt's primary research topics were the critical theory of the Frankfurt School, philosophy of religion, and Arthur Schopenhauer's philosophy.

Schmidt was a member of the International PEN and an honorary member of the Schopenhauer Society.

== Major works ==
- Der Begriff der Natur in der Lehre von Karl Marx. Frankfurt am Main: Europäische Verlagsanstalt, 1962. (English translation: The Concept of Nature in Marx. Translated by Ben Fowkes. London: NLB, 1971, ISBN 0-902308-41-6.)
- Geschichte und Struktur. Fragen einer marxistischen Historik. München: Hanser, 1971, ISBN 3-446-11504-8. (English translation: History and structure. An essay on Hegelian-Marxist and structuralist theories of history. Translated by Jeffrey Herf. Cambridge, Massachusetts: MIT Press, 1981, ISBN 0-262-19198-9.)
- Herbert Marcuse and Alfred Schmidt: Existenzialistische Marx-Interpretation. Frankfurt am Main: Europäische Verlagsanstalt, 1973, ISBN 3-434-20055-X.
- Emanzipatorische Sinnlichkeit. Ludwig Feuerbachs anthropologischer Materialismus. München: Hanser, 1973, ISBN 3-446-11652-4. (Spanish translation: Feuerbach, o, La sensualidad emancipada. Translated by Julio Carabaña. Madrid: Taurus, 1975, ISBN 84-306-1129-0.)
- Zur Idee der Kritischen Theorie. Elemente der Philosophie Max Horkheimers. München: Hanser, 1974, ISBN 3-446-11863-2.
- Die Kritische Theorie als Geschichtsphilosophie. München: Hanser, 1976, ISBN 3-446-12201-X.
- Drei Studien über Materialismus. Schopenhauer. Horkheimer. Glücksproblem. München: Hanser, 1977, ISBN 3-446-12460-8.
- Kritische Theorie, Humanismus, Aufklärung. Philosophische Arbeiten. Stuttgart: Reclam, 1981, ISBN 3-15-009977-3.
- Goethes herrlich leuchtende Natur. Philosophische Studie zur deutschen Spätaufklärung. München: Hanser, 1984, ISBN 3-446-14141-3.
- Die Wahrheit im Gewande der Lüge. Schopenhauers Religionsphilosophie. München; Zürich: Piper, 1986, ISBN 3-492-10639-0.
- Entstehungsgeschichte der humanitären Freimaurerei. Deistische Wurzeln und Aspekte. Ed. by Klaus-Jürgen Grün and Thomas Forwe. Leipzig: Salier-Verlag, 2014, ISBN 978-3-943539-40-0 (posthumous).
