= The Concept of Nature in Marx =

1962 book by Alfred Schmidt

- Cover of the first edition
- Author: Alfred Schmidt
- Original title: Der Begriff der Natur in der Lehre von Marx
- Language: German
- Subject: Karl Marx
- Published: 1962 (in German); 1971 (in English)
- Publication place: Germany
- Media type: Print (Hardcover and Paperback)
- ISBN: 978-1781681473

The Concept of Nature in Marx (German: Der Begriff der Natur in der Lehre von Marx) is a 1962 book by the philosopher Alfred Schmidt. First published in English in 1971, it is a classic account of Karl Marx's ideas about nature.

== Summary ==
Schmidt argues that, according to Marx, "[h]uman beings are part of Nature yet able to stand over against it; and this partial separation from Nature is itself part of their nature."

== Reception ==
The political scientist David McLellan describes The Concept of Nature in Marx as, "an important and well-documented consideration of the importance of Marx's materialism."
