= One-Dimensional Man =

1964 book by Herbert Marcuse

- Cover of the first edition
- Author: Herbert Marcuse
- Language: English
- Subjects: Capitalism, communism, democracy, industrialization
- Publisher: Beacon Press
- Publication date: 1964
- Publication place: United States
- Media type: Print
- Pages: 257
- ISBN: 0-415-07429-0 (2. ed.)
- Dewey Decimal: 301.243
- LC Class: HM101 .M268

One-Dimensional Man: Studies in the Ideology of Advanced Industrial Society is a 1964 book by the German–American philosopher and critical theorist Herbert Marcuse, in which the author offers a wide-ranging critique of both the contemporary capitalist society of the Western Bloc and the communist society of the Soviet Union, documenting the parallel rise of new forms of social repression in both of these societies, and the decline of revolutionary potential in the West. He argues that the "advanced industrial society" created false needs, which integrate individuals into the existing system of production and consumption via mass media, advertising, industrial management, and contemporary modes of thought.

This results in a "one-dimensional" universe of thought and behavior, in which aptitude and ability for critical thought and oppositional behavior wither away. Against this prevailing climate, Marcuse promotes the "great refusal" (described at length in the book) as the only adequate opposition to all-encompassing methods of control. Much of the book is a defense of "negative thinking" as a disrupting force against the prevailing positivism.

Marcuse also analyzes the integration of the industrial working class into capitalist society and new forms of capitalist stabilization, thus questioning the Marxian postulates of the revolutionary proletariat and the inevitability of capitalist crisis. In contrast to orthodox Marxism, Marcuse champions non-integrated forces of minorities, outsiders, and radical intelligentsia, attempting to nourish oppositional thought and behavior through promoting radical thinking and opposition. He considers the trends towards bureaucracy in supposedly Marxist countries to be as oppositional to freedom as those in the capitalist West. One-Dimensional Man bolstered Marcuse's fame as a contemporary Western philosopher.

== Summary ==
Marcuse strongly criticizes consumerism and modern "industrial society", which he claims is a form of social control. Marcuse argues that while the system the West lives in may claim to be democratic, it is actually totalitarian. A form of technological rationality has imposed itself on every aspect of culture and public life, and has become hegemonic. Through our identification with this hegemonic ideology of modern industrial society, this ideology doesn't only represent a form of "false consciousness", yet rather has succeeded in becoming reality.

Modern industrial societies have furthermore created an "affluent society", which in increasing comfort have disguised the exploitative nature of the system, and have therefore strengthened means of domination and control. Modern "affluent society" therefore limits opportunities for political revolution against capitalism.

Marcuse contends that in contemporary consumer societies, a select few wield the power to shape our conceptions of freedom by offering us the means to purchase our own happiness. In this state of "unfreedom", consumers act irrationally by working more than they are required to in order to fulfill actual basic needs, by ignoring the psychologically destructive effects, by ignoring the waste and environmental damage it causes, and by searching for social connection through material items.

It is even more irrational in the sense that the creation of new products, calling for the disposal of old products, fuels the economy and encourages the need to work more to buy more. An individual loses his humanity and becomes a tool in the industrial machine and a cog in the consumer machine. Additionally, advertising sustains consumerism, which disintegrates societal demeanor, delivered in bulk and informing the masses that happiness can be bought, an idea that is psychologically damaging.

There are alternatives to counter the consumer lifestyle. Anti-consumerism is a lifestyle that demotes any unnecessary consumption, as well as unnecessary work, waste, etc. But even this alternative is complicated by the extreme interpenetration of advertising and commodification because everything is a commodity, even those things that are actual needs.

== Reception ==
The critical theorist Douglas Kellner asserted that One-Dimensional Man stands out as a paramount work of the 1960s and remains one of the most subversive literary contributions of the twentieth century. Despite its pessimism, represented by the citation of the words of Walter Benjamin at the end of this book that "Nur um der Hoffnungslosen willen ist uns die Hoffnung gegeben" ("It is only for the sake of those without hope that hope is given to us"), it influenced many in the New Left as it articulated their growing dissatisfaction with both capitalist societies and Soviet communist societies.

In One Dimensional Man In Class Society, political writer Paul Mattick criticized Marcuse's book, arguing that Marcuse overstates integration and underestimates capitalism’s continued proneness toward crisis. In a private correspondence to Mattick, Marcuse praised this critique, stating that "yours is the only central criticism."

The philosopher Ronald Aronson wrote in 2014 that One-Dimensional Man is more prescient than Marcuse could have ever realized and that it is more relevant than ever.

== See also ==
- Critical theory
- Criticism of capitalism
- Drux Flux, an animated short inspired by One-Dimensional Man.
- Inverted totalitarianism
- J. L. Talmon
- Minority rights
- Repressive desublimation
- Superficiality
- Totalitarian democracy
- Unflattening, a scholarly graphic novel expanding on many ideas from One-Dimensional Man.
