= Herbert Marcuse =

German–American philosopher, sociologist, and political theorist (1898–1979)

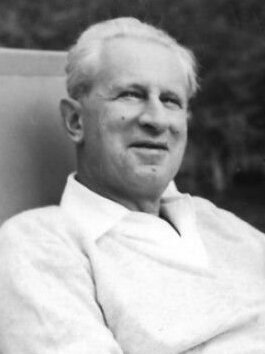
- Marcuse in 1955
- Born: July 19, 1898; Berlin, German Empire
- Died: July 29, 1979 (aged 81); Starnberg, West Germany
- Spouse(s): Sophie Wertheim (m. 1924; died 1951) Inge Neumann (m. 1955; died 1973) Erica Sherover (m. 1976)

Education
- Education: University of Berlin; University of Freiburg (PhD, 1922; Dr. phil. hab., 1932)
- Doctoral advisor: Martin Heidegger (Dr. phil. hab. advisor)

Philosophical work
- Era: 20th-century philosophy
- Region: Western philosophy
- School: Continental philosophy; Frankfurt School; Western Marxism; Dialectical phenomenology
- Institutions: University of Frankfurt am Main; Columbia University; Harvard University; Brandeis University; University of California, San Diego; Max Planck Society
- Doctoral students: Angela Davis; Andrew Feenberg; Paul Gottfried; William Leiss
- Notable students: Kenley R. Dove
- Main interests: Social theory; communism; socialism; industrialism; technology
- Notable works: Eros and Civilization (1955); One-Dimensional Man (1964)
- Notable ideas: Technological rationality; great refusal; one-dimensional man; work as free play of human faculties; repressive tolerance; repressive desublimation; negative thinking; totalitarian democracy

Herbert Marcuse (/mɑːrˈkuːzə/ mar-KOO-zə; German: [maʁˈkuːzə]; July 19, 1898 – July 29, 1979) was a German and American philosopher, social critic, and political theorist, associated with the Frankfurt School of critical theory. Born in Berlin, Marcuse studied at the Friedrich Wilhelm University of Berlin and then at the University of Freiburg, where he received his PhD under the supervision of Martin Heidegger. He was a prominent figure in the Frankfurt-based Institute for Social Research, which later became known as the Frankfurt School. In his written works, he criticized capitalism, modern technology, Soviet Communism, and popular culture, arguing that they represent new forms of social control.

In the 1960s and the 1970s, he became known as the pre-eminent theorist of the New Left and the student movements of West Germany, France, and the United States; some consider him "the Father of the New Left".

The best-known works of Herbert Marcuse are Eros and Civilization (1955) and One-Dimensional Man (1964). His Marxist scholarship inspired many radical intellectuals and political activists in the 1960s and 1970s, and has from then on considerably influenced left-wing political thinking in the Western world. The name "Marcuse" itself, however, remains obscure outside of specialized contexts where critical theory is taught or referenced.

== Biography ==
=== Early years ===
Herbert Marcuse was born July 19, 1898, in Berlin, to Carl Marcuse and Gertrud Kreslawsky. Marcuse's family was a German upper-middle-class Jewish family that was well integrated into German society. Marcuse moved from Berlin to the suburb of Charlottenburg, the center of West Berlin. Marcuse's formal education began at Mommsen Gymnasium and continued at the Kaiserin-Augusta Gymnasium in Charlottenburg from 1911 to 1916. In 1916, he was drafted into the German Army, but only worked in horse stables in Berlin during World War I. He spent his entire military service in Germany. While in Berlin, he managed to secure permission to attend lectures at the university of Berlin while still on active duty. He then became a member of a Soldiers' Council that participated in the abortive socialist Spartacist uprising. During the instability in Germany immediately after WW1, right-wing snipers were targeting left-wing demonstrators and dissenters. Marcuse was assigned a position as an anti-sniper, searching for and shooting the right-wing snipers.

In 1919, he attended the Friedrich Wilhelm University of Berlin, taking classes for four semesters. In 1920, he transferred to the University of Freiburg to concentrate on German literature, philosophy, politics, and economics. He completed his Ph.D. thesis at the University of Freiburg in 1922 on the German Künstlerroman, after which he moved back to Berlin, where he worked in publishing. Two years later, he married Sophie Wertheim, a mathematician.

He returned to Freiburg in 1928 to write a habilitation under Martin Heidegger, titled Hegel's Ontology and the Theory of Historicity (Hegels Ontologie und die Theorie der Geschichtlichkeit, 1932). Written during the Hegel Renaissance across Europe, it focused on Hegel's ontology of life and history, and his idealist theory of spirit and dialectic.

=== Institute for Social Research ===
In 1932, Marcuse stopped working with Heidegger, who joined the Nazi Party in 1933. Marcuse understood that he would not qualify as a professor under the Nazi regime. Marcuse was then hired to work for the University of Frankfurt Institute for Social Research. The Institute deposited their endowment in Holland in anticipation of the Nazi takeover, so Marcuse never actually worked in the school there. Instead, he left Nazi Germany in May 1933 and began his work with the Institute in Geneva, where a branch office had been formed. While a member of the Frankfurt School, Marcuse developed a model for critical social theory, created a theory of the new stage of state and monopoly capitalism, described the relationships between philosophy, social theory, and cultural criticism, and provided an analysis and critique of German Nazism. Marcuse worked closely with critical theorists while at the institute.

=== Emigration to the United States ===
Marcuse emigrated to the United States in June 1934. He served at the institute's Columbia University branch from 1934 through 1942. He traveled to Washington, D.C., in 1942, to work for the Office of War Information, and afterward the Office of Strategic Services. Marcuse went on to teach at Brandeis University and the University of California, San Diego, later in his career. In 1940, he became a US citizen and resided in the country until his death in 1979. Although he never returned to Germany to live, he remained one of the major theorists associated with the Frankfurt School, along with Max Horkheimer and Theodor W. Adorno (among others). In 1940, Marcuse published Reason and Revolution, a dialectical work studying Hegel and Karl Marx.

=== World War II ===
During World War II, Marcuse first worked for the US Office of War Information (OWI) on anti-Nazi propaganda projects. In 1943, he transferred to the Research and Analysis Branch (R&A) of the Office of Strategic Services (OSS), the precursor to the Central Intelligence Agency. Marcuse joined fellow Frankfurt School scholar Franz Neumann in R&A's Central European Section as senior analyst. He rapidly established himself as "the leading analyst on Germany". A compilation of Marcuse's reports was later published in Secret Reports on Nazi Germany: The Frankfurt School Contribution to the War Effort (2013).

Directed by the Harvard historian William L. Langer, R&A was the largest American research institution in the first half of the twentieth century. At its zenith between 1943 and 1945, it employed over twelve hundred, four hundred of whom were stationed abroad. In many respects, it was the site where post-World War II American social science was born, with protégés of some of the most esteemed American university professors, as well as numerous European intellectual émigrés, in its ranks.

After the OSS was dissolved in 1945, Marcuse was employed by the US Department of State as head of the Central European section, becoming an intelligence analyst of Nazism. He analyzed the ideology of the Communist Party of the Soviet Union, publishing his criticism in the book Soviet Marxism: A Critical Analysis (1958). He retired after the death of his first wife in 1951.

=== Post-war career ===
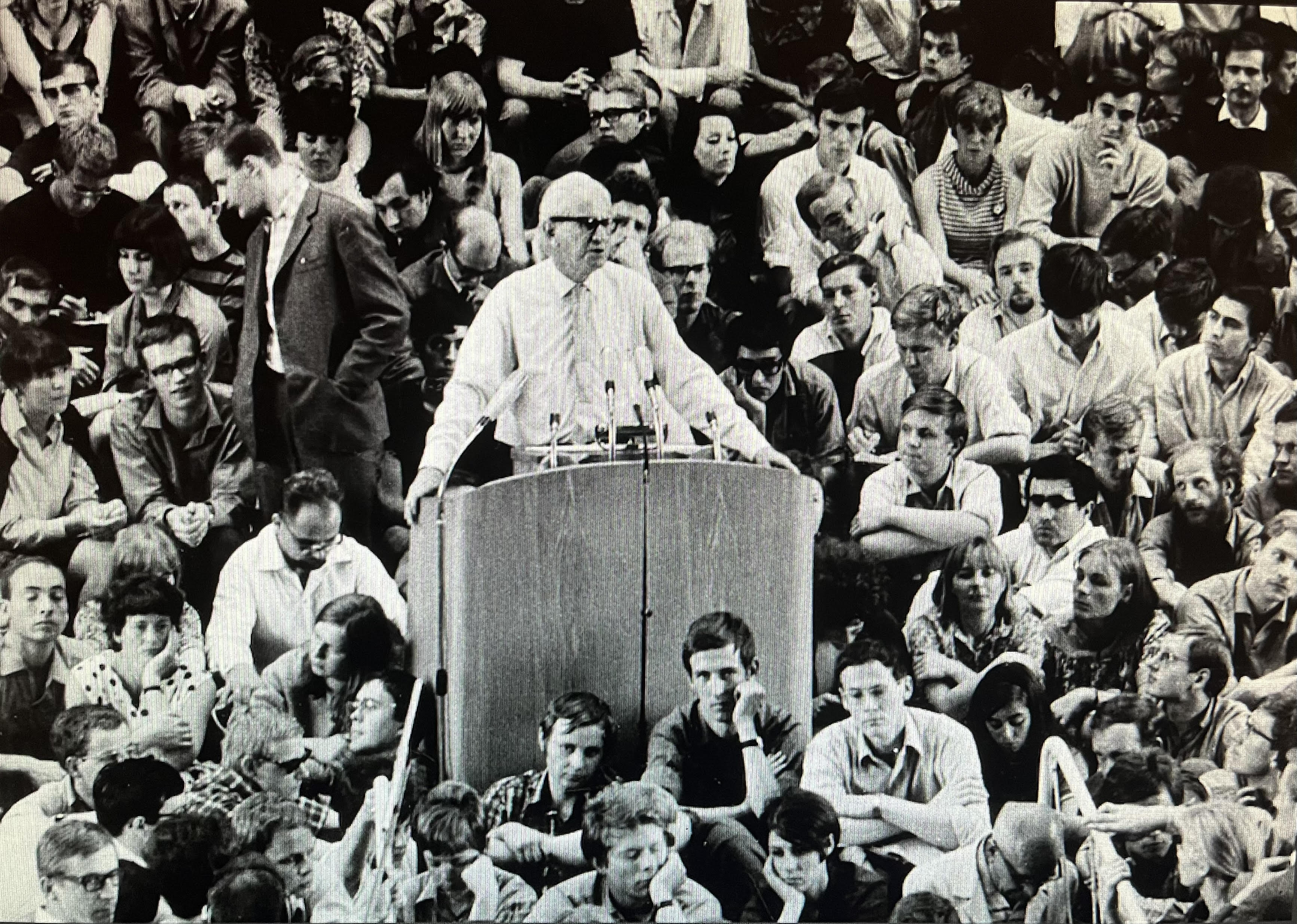
Marcuse giving a lecture in Berlin, 1967

Marcuse began his teaching career as a political theorist at Columbia University, then continued at Harvard University in 1952. Marcuse worked at Brandeis University from 1954 to 1965, then at the University of California, San Diego from 1965 to 1970. It was during his time at Brandeis that he wrote his most famous work, One-Dimensional Man (1964).

Marcuse was a friend and collaborator of the political sociologist Barrington Moore Jr. and of the political philosopher Robert Paul Wolff. He was also a friend of the Columbia University sociology professor C. Wright Mills, one of the founders of the New Left movement. In his "Introduction" to One-Dimensional Man, Marcuse wrote: "I should like to emphasize the vital importance of the work of C. Wright Mills."

In the post-war period, Marcuse rejected the theory of class struggle and the Marxist concern with labor, instead claiming, according to Leszek Kołakowski, that since "all questions of material existence have been solved, moral commands and prohibitions are no longer relevant." He regarded the realization of man's erotic nature as the true liberation of humanity, which inspired the utopias of Jerry Rubin and others.

Marcuse's critiques of capitalist society (especially his 1955 synthesis of Marx and Sigmund Freud in Eros and Civilization, his 1964 book One-Dimensional Man, and his 1965 essay "Repressive Tolerance") resonated with the concerns of the student movement in the 1960s because of his willingness to speak at student protests. He had been given the title "Philosopher of the New Left" for his rejection of the traditions of Western civilization. The New Left provided an attractive alternative to American society and Marcuse was able to appeal to many young individuals through his teachings of utopianism. His ideas critiqued contemporary liberalism and its conservative vestiges of nineteenth-century liberalism. Marcuse soon became known in the media as "Father of the New Left." Contending that the students of the '60s were not waiting for the publication of his work to act, Marcuse brushed the media's branding of him as "Father of the New Left" aside lightly, saying: "It would have been better to call me not the father, but the grandfather, of the New Left." His work strongly influenced intellectual discourse on popular culture and scholarly popular culture studies. In particular, he influenced youth because he "spoke their language." He understood the importance of rock and roll, for example, as a symbol for New Left activism. He had many speaking engagements in the US and Western Bloc in the late 1960s and 1970s. He became a close friend and inspirer of the French philosopher André Gorz.

Marcuse defended the arrested East German dissident Rudolf Bahro (author of Die Alternative: Zur Kritik des real existierenden Sozialismus [trans., The Alternative in Eastern Europe]), discussing in a 1979 essay Bahro's theories of "change from within".

=== Marriages ===
Marcuse and his first wife, Sophie Marcuse, in their New York apartment

Marcuse married three times. His first wife was mathematician Sophie Wertheim (1901–1951), whom he married in 1924 and had his first son Peter with in 1928. Before emigrating to New York in 1934, they resided in Freiburg, Berlin, Geneva, and Paris. They lived in Los Angeles/Santa Monica and Washington, D.C., in the 1930s and 1940s. In 1951, Sophie Wertheim died due to cancer. Marcuse later married Inge Neumann (1914–1973), the widow of his close friend Franz Neumann (1900–1954). After his second wife Inge died in 1973, Marcuse married Erica Sherover (1938–1988), a former graduate student at the University of California, in 1976.

=== Children ===
In his first marriage with Sophie Wertheim, they had one son, Peter Marcuse, born in 1928. Peter Marcuse was a professor emeritus of urban planning at Columbia University in New York. Although Marcuse did not have any children with Inge Neumann Marcuse, he helped raise her two sons, Thomas Neumann and Michael Neumann. Thomas (now Osha) is a Berkeley-based writer, activist, lawyer, and muralist. Michael works as a philosophy professor at Trent University in Peterborough, Ontario, Canada.

Marcuse's granddaughter was the novelist Irene Marcuse and his grandson, Harold Marcuse, is a professor of history at the University of California, Santa Barbara.

=== Death ===
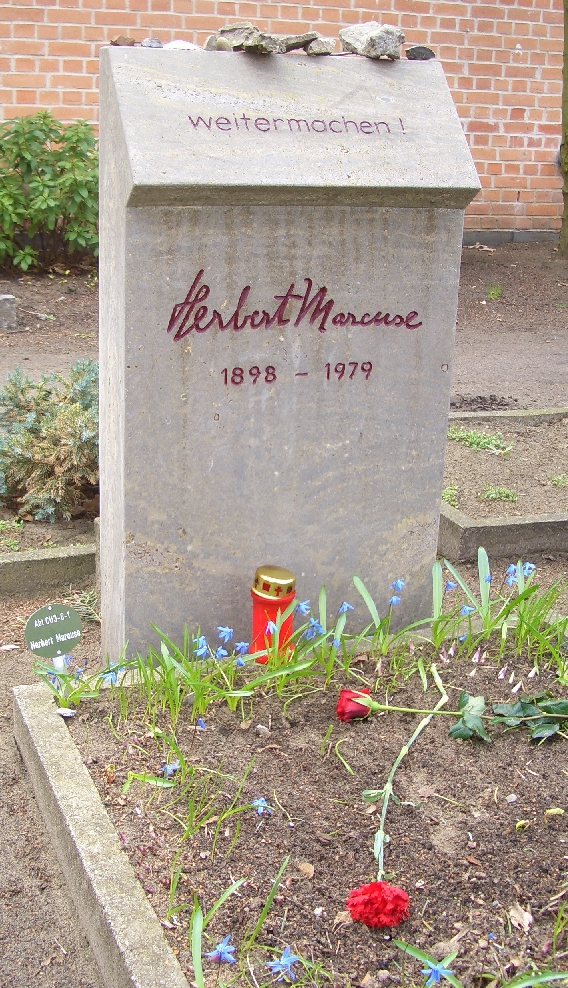
Grave in the Dorotheenstädtischer cemetery, Berlin, where Marcuse's ashes were buried in 2003

In July 1979, Marcuse spoke at the Frankfurt Römerberggespräche in Germany. At the invitation of second-generation Frankfurt School theorist Jürgen Habermas, he was then to visit the Max Planck Institute for the Study of the Scientific-Technical World in Starnberg, where he had delivered lectures and participated in discussions from 1974 to 1979 On his way there, however, he suffered a stroke and died on July 29, 1979, ten days after his eighty-first birthday.

In 2003, after Marcuse's ashes were rediscovered in the United States, they were buried in the Dorotheenstädtischer cemetery in Berlin.

== Philosophy and views ==
Marcuse's concept of repressive desublimation, which has become well-known, refers to his argument that postwar mass culture, with its profusion of sexual provocations, serves to reinforce political repression. If people are preoccupied with inauthentic sexual stimulation, their political energy will be "desublimated"; instead of acting constructively to change the world, they remain repressed and uncritical. Marcuse advanced the prewar thinking of critical theory toward a critical account of the "one-dimensional" nature of bourgeois life in Europe and America. His thinking has been seen as an advance of the concerns of earlier liberal critics such as David Riesman.

Two aspects of Marcuse's work are of particular importance. First, his use of language more familiar from the critique of Soviet or Nazi regimes to characterize developments in the advanced industrial world. Second, his grounding of critical theory in a particular use of psychoanalytic thought.

=== Marcuse's early Heideggerian Marxism ===
During his years in Freiburg, Marcuse wrote a series of essays that explored the possibility of synthesizing Marxism and Heidegger's fundamental ontology, as begun in the latter's work Being and Time (1927). This early interest in Heidegger followed Marcuse's demand for "concrete philosophy," which, he declared in 1928, "concerns itself with the truth of contemporaneous human existence." These words were directed against the neo-Kantianism of the mainstream, and against both the revisionist and orthodox Marxist alternatives, in which the subjectivity of the individual played little role. Though Marcuse quickly distanced himself from Heidegger following Heidegger's endorsement of Nazism, thinkers such as Jürgen Habermas have suggested that an understanding of Marcuse's later thinking demands an appreciation of his early Heideggerian influence.

=== Marcuse and capitalism ===
Marcuse's analysis of capitalism derives partially from one of Karl Marx's main concepts: Objectification, which under capitalism becomes alienation. Marx believed that capitalism was exploiting humans; that by producing objects of a certain character, laborers became alienated, and this ultimately dehumanized them into functional objects themselves.

Marcuse took this belief and expanded it. He argued that capitalism and industrialization pushed laborers so hard that they began to see themselves as extensions of the objects they were producing. At the beginning of One-Dimensional Man Marcuse writes, "The people recognize themselves in their commodities; they find their soul in their automobile, hi-fi set, split-level home, kitchen equipment," meaning that under capitalism (in consumer society), humans become extensions of the commodities that they buy, thus making commodities extensions of people's minds and bodies. Affluent mass technological societies, he argues, are controlled and manipulated. In societies based upon mass production and mass distribution, the individual worker has become merely a consumer of its commodities and entire commodified way of life. Modern capitalism has created false needs and false consciousness geared to the consumption of commodities: it locks one-dimensional man into the one-dimensional society which produced the need for people to recognize themselves in their commodities.

The very mechanism that ties the individual to his society has changed, and social control is anchored in the new needs that it has produced. Most important of all, the pressure of consumerism has led to the total integration of the working class into the capitalist system. Its political parties and trade unions have become thoroughly bureaucratized and the power of negative thinking or critical reflection has rapidly declined. The working class is no longer a potentially subversive force capable of bringing about revolutionary change.

Marcuse evolved a theory over the years that stated modern technology is repressive naturally. He believed that in both capitalist and communist societies, workers did not question the manner in which they lived due to the mechanism of repression of technological advances. The use of technology allowed people to not be aware of what is occurring around them such as the fact that they might soon be out of their jobs because these technologies are carrying out their same jobs quicker and cheaper. He claimed the modern-day workers were not as rebellious as before during the Karl Marx era (19th century). They just freely conformed to the system they were under for the sake of satisfying their needs and survival. Since they had conformed, the people's revolution that Marcuse felt was necessary never happened.

As a result, rather than looking to the workers as the revolutionary vanguard, Marcuse put his faith in an alliance between radical intellectuals and those groups not yet integrated into one-dimensional society: the socially marginalized, the substratum of the outcasts and outsiders, the exploited and persecuted of other ethnicities and other colors, the unemployed and the unemployable. These were the people whose standards of living demanded the ending of intolerable conditions and institutions and whose resistance to one-dimensional society would not be diverted by the system. Their opposition was revolutionary even if their consciousness was not.

=== The New Left and radical politics ===
Many radical scholars and activists were influenced by Marcuse, such as Norman O. Brown, Angela Davis, Charles J. Moore, Abbie Hoffman, Rudi Dutschke, Germaine Greer, and Robert M. Young (see the List of Scholars and Activists link below). Among those who critiqued him from the left were Marxist-humanist Raya Dunayevskaya, fellow German emigre Paul Mattick, both of whom subjected One-Dimensional Man to a Marxist critique, and Noam Chomsky, who knew and liked Marcuse "but thought very little of his work." In his 1965 essay "Repressive Tolerance," Marcuse argues that genuine tolerance does not permit support for "repression", since doing so ensures that marginalized voices will remain unheard. He characterizes tolerance of repressive speech as "inauthentic". Instead, he advocates a form of tolerance that is intolerant of repressive (namely right-wing) political movements:

Liberating tolerance, then, would mean intolerance against movements from the Right and toleration of movements from the Left. Surely, no government can be expected to foster its own subversion, but in a democracy such a right is vested in the people (i.e. in the majority of the people). This means that the ways should not be blocked on which a subversive majority could develop, and if they are blocked by organized repression and indoctrination, their reopening may require apparently undemocratic means. They would include the withdrawal of toleration of speech and assembly from groups and movements that promote aggressive policies, armament, chauvinism, discrimination on the grounds of race and religion, or that oppose the extension of public services, social security, medical care, etc.

Marcuse later expressed his radical ideas through three pieces of writing. He wrote An Essay on Liberation in 1969, in which he celebrated liberation movements such as those in Vietnam, which inspired many radicals. In 1972 he wrote Counterrevolution and Revolt, which argues that the hopes of the 1960s were facing a counterrevolution from the right.

After Brandeis denied the renewal of his teaching contract in 1965, Marcuse taught at the University of California, San Diego. In 1966, the FBI officially began systematic surveillance on Marcuse due to his perceived role in the emerging student protest movement. His FBI file revealed that he had already been under surveillance between 1942 and 1952. In 1968, California Governor Ronald Reagan and other conservatives objected to his reappointment, but the university decided to let his contract run until 1970. He devoted the rest of his life to teaching, writing and giving lectures around the world. His efforts brought him attention from the media, which claimed that he openly advocated violence, although he often clarified that only "violence of defense" could be appropriate, not "violence of aggression." He continued to promote Marxian theory, with some of his students helping to spread his ideas. He published his final work The Aesthetic Dimension in 1977 on the role of art in the process of what he termed "emancipation" from bourgeois society.

=== Marcuse and feminism ===
Marcuse felt that societal reform may be found among the outcast of society, thus he supported movements such as the feminist movement.

Marcuse was particularly concerned with feminism near the end of his life, for reasons he explained in a public lecture Marxism and Feminism in 1974, mentioning this in a Stanford lecture, "I believe the Women's Liberation Movement is perhaps the most important and potentially the most radical political movement that we have – even if the consciousness of this fact has not yet penetrated the Movement as a whole". Many themes and ambitions from Marcuse's work found embodiment in socialist feminism, especially ideas developed in Eros and Civilization. It involved changes not only in the structural power relations of society, but in the instinctual drives of individual human beings. Although he regarded women's participation in the labor force as positive, and a necessary condition for women's liberation, Marcuse did not consider it sufficient for true freedom. He hoped for a shift in moral values away from aggressive and masculine qualities towards feminine ones.

Jessica Benjamin and Nancy Chodorow believed that Marcuse's reliance on Freud's drive theory as the source of the desire for societal change is inadequate for both philosophers since he fails to account for the individual's intersubjective growth.

== Criticism ==
Leszek Kołakowski described Marcuse's views as essentially anti-Marxist, in that they ignored Marx's critique of Hegel and discarded the historical theory of class struggle entirely in favor of an inverted Freudian reading of human history where all social rules could and should be discarded to create a "New World of Happiness." Kołakowski concluded that Marcuse's ideal society "is to be ruled despotically by an enlightened group [who] have realized in themselves the unity of Logos and Eros, and thrown off the vexatious authority of logic, mathematics, and the empirical sciences."

The philosopher Alasdair MacIntyre asserted that Marcuse falsely assumed consumers were completely passive, uncritically responding to corporate advertising. MacIntyre frankly opposed Marcuse. "It will be my crucial contention in this book," MacIntyre stated, "that almost all of Marcuse's key positions are false. For example, Marcuse was not an orthodox Marxist. Like many of the Frankfurt School, Marcuse wrote of "critical theory" not of "Marxism" and MacIntyre notes a similarity in this to the Right Hegelians, whom Marx attacked. Hence, MacIntyre proposed that Marcuse be regarded as "a pre-Marxist thinker". According to MacIntyre, Marcuse's assumptions about advanced industrial society were wrong in whole and in part. "Marcuse," concluded MacIntyre, "invokes the great names of freedom and reason while betraying their substance at every important point."

== Legacy ==
Herbert Marcuse appealed to students of the New Left through his emphasis on the power of critical thought and his vision of total human emancipation and a selectively repressive civilization. He supported students he felt were subject to the pressures of a commodifying system, and has been regarded as an inspirational intellectual leader. He is also considered among the most influential of the Frankfurt School critical theorists on American culture, due to his studies on student and counter-cultural movements on the 1960s. The legacy of the 1960s, of which Marcuse was a vital part, lives on, and the great refusal is still practiced by oppositional groups and individuals.

Eros and Civilization is one of Marcuse's most notable works, and his insensitivity to human relatedness portrayed in this project is considered the key failure of this work. His insights of psychoanalytic object relations theory in this project have not been wedded or reinterpreted, without abandoning its core principles.

Marcuse's thought remains influential in the 21st century. In the introduction to an issue of the journal New Political Science dedicated to Marcuse, Robert Kirsch and Sarah Surak described his influence as "alive and well, vibrant across multiple fields of inquiry across many areas of social relations". Marcuse's concept of repressive tolerance attracted renewed attention following the 9/11 attacks. Repressive tolerance is also relevant to 21st-century campus protests and the Black Lives Matter movement.

Marcuse is not widely remembered outside of contexts where critical theory is taught or referenced. This theory, rooted in Marxist philosophy, remains as one of the main components of Marcuse's influence.

== Bibliography ==
Books

- Hegel's Ontology and the Theory of Historicity (1932), originally written in German, in English 1987.
- Studie über Autorität und Familie (1936) in German, republished 1987, 2005. Marcuse wrote just over 100 pages in this 900-page study.
- Reason and Revolution: Hegel and the Rise of Social Theory (1941) ISBN 978-1-57392-718-5
- Eros and Civilization: A Philosophical Inquiry into Freud (1955) ISBN 978-0-415-18663-6
- Soviet Marxism: A Critical Analysis (1958)
- One-Dimensional Man: Studies in the Ideology of Advanced Industrial Society (1964)
- A Critique of Pure Tolerance (1965) Essay "Repressive Tolerance," with additional essays by Robert Paul Wolff and Barrington Moore Jr.
- Negations: Essays in Critical Theory (1968)
- An Essay on Liberation (1969)
- Five Lectures (1969)
- Counterrevolution and Revolt (1972) ISBN 978-0-8070-1533-9
- The Aesthetic Dimension: Toward a Critique of Marxist Aesthetics (1978) ISBN 978-0-8070-1519-3

Essays

- "Neue Quellen zur Grundlegung des Historischen Materialismus" (1932)
- "Repressive Tolerance" (1965)
- "Liberation" (1969)
- "On the Problem of the Dialectic" (1976)
- "Protosocialism and Late Capitalism: Toward a Theoretical Synthesis Based on Bahro's Analysis" (1980)

== See also ==
- Eros effect
- Men of Ideas

== Sources ==
- MacIntyre, Alasdair (1970), Herbert Marcuse. An exposition and a polemic, New York: Viking.
