= List of Nobel laureates affiliated with Columbia University as alumni or faculty =

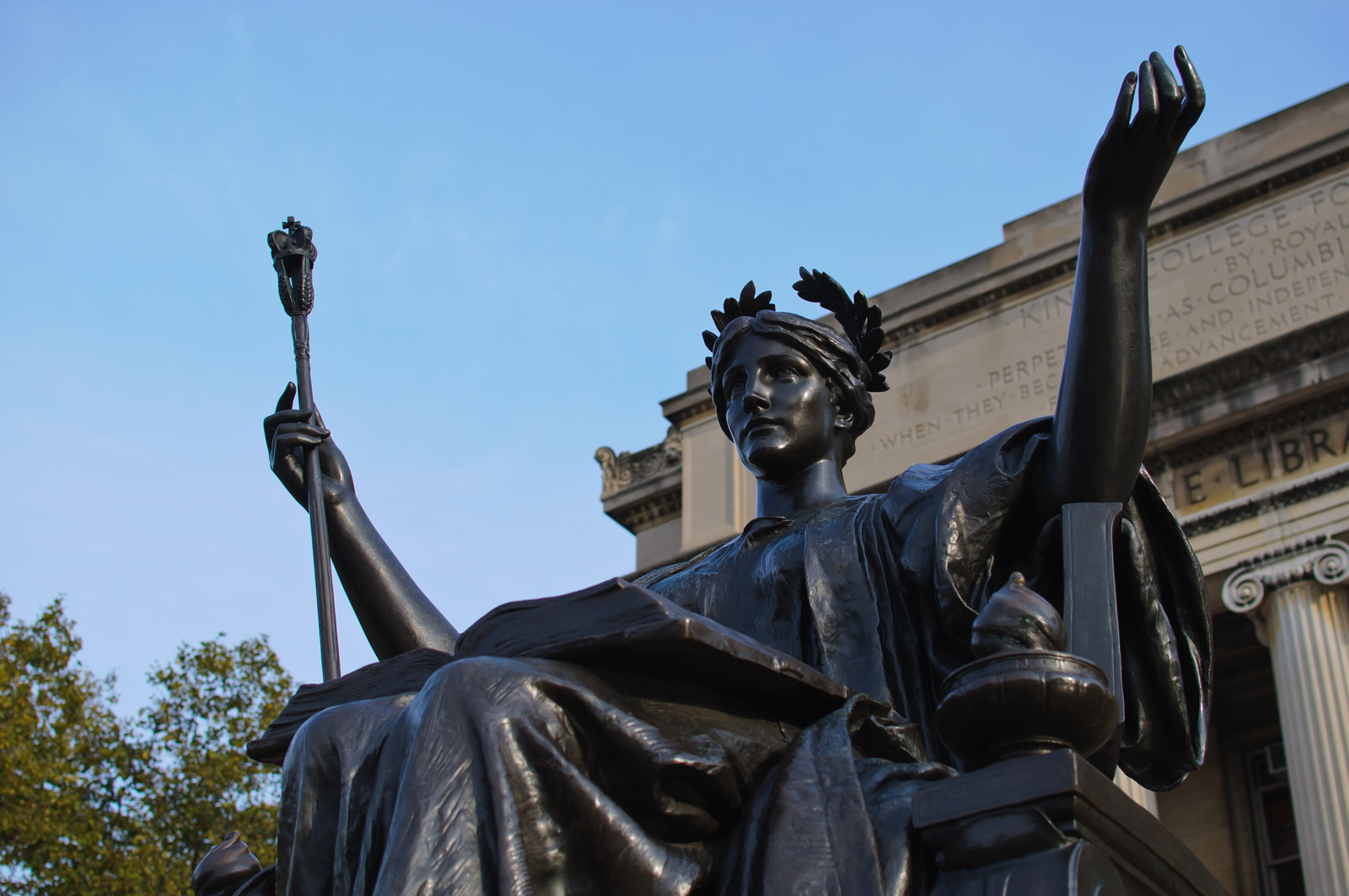
The central Alma Mater statue at Columbia University. As of the 2026 awards, 106 Nobel laureates have been affiliated with Columbia University.

This list of Nobel laureates affiliated with Columbia University as alumni or faculty comprehensively shows alumni (graduates and attendees) or faculty members (professors of various ranks, researchers, and visiting lecturers or professors) affiliated with Columbia University in New York City who were awarded the Nobel Prize or the Nobel Memorial Prize in Economic Sciences. People who have given public lectures, talks or non-curricular seminars; studied as non-degree students; received honorary degrees; or served as administrative staff at the university are excluded from the list. Summer school attendees and visitors are generally excluded from the list, since summer terms are not part of formal academic years; the same rule applies to the extension school.

Alumni or faculty members of Barnard College after 1900 and Bard College by 1944 are included in the list. Physicians and long-term medical staff of the Mary Imogene Bassett Hospital are included in the list.

The Nobel Prizes, established by the 1895 will of Alfred Nobel, are awarded to individuals who make outstanding contributions in the fields of Chemistry, Literature, Peace, Physics, and Physiology or Medicine. An associated prize, the Sveriges Riksbank Prize in Economic Sciences in Memory of Alfred Nobel (commonly known as the Nobel Prize in Economics), was instituted by Sweden's central bank, Sveriges Riksbank, in 1968 and was first awarded in 1969.

As of the 2026 awards, 106 Nobel laureates have been affiliated with Columbia University as alumni or faculty. Among the 106 laureates, 72 are Nobel laureates in natural sciences; (Note: The total number of laureates in natural sciences: Physics, Chemistry, and Physiology or Medicine.) 47 are Columbia alumni (graduates and attendees) and 36 have been long-term academic members of the Columbia faculty; and subject-wise, 33 laureates have won the Nobel Prize in Physics, more than any other subject. This list considers Nobel laureates as equal individuals and does not consider their various prize shares or if they received the prize more than once.

== Summary ==
All types of affiliations, namely alumni and faculty members, count equally in the following table and throughout the whole page. (Note: This is because, according to Wikipedia policies on no original research and objectivity/neutrality, it is not possible in Wikipedia to subjectively assign various weights to different types of affiliations.)

In the following list, the number following a person's name is the year they received the prize; in particular, a number with asterisk (*) means the person received the award while they were working at Columbia University (including emeritus staff). A name marked with a dagger (^{†}) indicates that this person has already been listed in a previous category (i.e., multiple affiliations).

Summary of Columbia University's Nobel Laureates
Category	Alumni	Professors of various ranks	Researchers or visitors
Total: 106	47	36	43
Physics (33)	1. Robert Millikan – 1923; 2. Isidor Rabi – 1944; 3. Julian Schwinger – 1965; 4. Leon Cooper – 1972; 5. James Rainwater – 1975; 6. Arno Penzias – 1978; 7. Val Fitch – 1980; 8. Leon Lederman – 1988; 9. Melvin Schwartz – 1988; 10. Norman Ramsey – 1989; 11. Martin Perl – 1995; 12. Arthur Ashkin – 2018; 13. John Clauser – 2022	1. Enrico Fermi – 1938; 2. Isidor Rabi^{†} – 1944*; 3. Hideki Yukawa – 1949*; 4. Willis Lamb – 1955; 5. Polykarp Kusch – 1955*; 6. Tsung-Dao Lee – 1957*; 7. Charles Townes – 1964; 8. James Rainwater^{†} – 1975*; 9. Samuel Ting – 1976; 10. Melvin Schwartz^{†} – 1988; 11. Leon Lederman^{†} – 1988; 12. Jack Steinberger – 1988; 13. Norman Ramsey^{†} – 1989; 14. Horst Störmer – 1998*	1. Emilio Segrè – 1959; 2. Maria Mayer – 1963; 3. Hans Bethe – 1967; 4. Murray Gell-Mann – 1969; 5. Aage Bohr – 1975; 6. Samuel Ting^{†} – 1976; 7. Steven Weinberg – 1979; 8. Arthur Schawlow – 1981; 9. Carlo Rubbia – 1984; 10. Leon Lederman^{†} – 1988; 11. Daniel Tsui – 1998; 12. John C. Mather – 2006; 13. Giorgio Parisi – 2021
Chemistry (16)	1. Irving Langmuir – 1932; 2. John H. Northrop – 1946; 3. William H. Stein – 1972; 4. Roald Hoffmann – 1981; 5. Herbert Hauptman – 1985; 6. Sidney Altman – 1989; 7. William S. Knowles – 2001; 8. Robert Grubbs – 2005; 9. Robert Lefkowitz – 2012; 10. Louis E. Brus – 2023	1. Harold Urey – 1934*; 2. Martin Chalfie – 2008*; 3. Martin Karplus – 2013; 4. Joachim Frank – 2017*; 5. Louis E. Brus^{†} – 2023*	1. Willard Libby – 1960; 2. Luis Leloir – 1970
Physiology or Medicine (23)	1. Hermann J. Muller – 1946; 2. Edward C. Kendall – 1950; 3. Dickinson Richards – 1956; 4. Joshua Lederberg – 1958; 5. Konrad Bloch – 1964; 6. George Wald – 1967; 7. Konrad Lorenz – 1973; 8. Baruch Blumberg – 1976; 9. Baruj Benacerraf – 1980; 10. Harold Varmus – 1989; 11. Louis Ignarro – 1998; 12. Richard Axel – 2004	1. Thomas H. Morgan – 1933; 2. André Cournand – 1956*; 3. Dickinson Richards^{†} – 1956*; 4. Eric Kandel – 2000*; 5. Richard Axel^{†} – 2004*; 6. James Rothman – 2013	1. Hermann J. Muller^{†} – 1946; 2. Joshua Lederberg^{†} – 1958; 3. Konrad Bloch^{†} – 1964; 4. Salvador Luria – 1969; 5. Baruch Blumberg^{†} – 1976; 6. Carleton Gajdusek – 1976; 7. Daniel Nathans – 1978; 8. Baruj Benacerraf^{†} – 1980; 9. Sune Bergström – 1982; 10. Donnall Thomas – 1990; 11. Linda Buck – 2004; 12. David Julius – 2021
Economics (18)	1. Simon Kuznets – 1971; 2. Kenneth Arrow – 1972; 3. Milton Friedman – 1976; 4. Robert Fogel – 1993; 5. William Vickrey – 1996; 6. Robert C. Merton – 1997; 7. Alvin Roth – 2012	1. George Stigler – 1982; 2. Gary Becker – 1992; 3. William Vickrey^{†} – 1996*; 4. Robert Mundell – 1999*; 5. James Heckman – 2000; 6. Joseph Stiglitz – 2001*; 7. Edmund Phelps – 2006*; 8. Michael Woodford – 2026*	1. Milton Friedman^{†} – 1976; 2. Franco Modigliani – 1985; 3. Robert Solow – 1987; 4. Joseph Stiglitz^{†} – 2001; 5. David Card – 2021; 6. Joshua Angrist – 2021
Literature (7)	1. Louise Glück – 2020	1. Orhan Pamuk – 2006	1. Gabriela Mistral – 1945; 2. Joseph Brodsky – 1987; 3. Nadine Gordimer – 1991; 4. Derek Walcott – 1992; 5. Orhan Pamuk^{†} – 2006; 6. László Krasznahorkai – 2025
Peace (9)	1. Theodore Roosevelt – 1906; 2. Nicholas Butler – 1931; 3. Jose Ramos-Horta – 1996; 4. Barack Obama – 2009	1. Nicholas Butler^{†} – 1931; 2. Maria Ressa – 2021	1. Elie Wiesel – 1986; 2. Al Gore – 2007; 3. Liu Xiaobo – 2010; 4. Leymah Gbowee – 2011

== Nobel laureates by category ==
=== Nobel laureates in Physics ===
Nobel Laureates in Physics
No.	Image	Name	Year	Affiliation with Columbia University
1	Portrait of Robert Andrews Millikan	Robert Millikan	1923	PhD
2	Portrait of Enrico Fermi	Enrico Fermi	1938	Professor
3	Portrait of Isidor Isaac Rabi	Isidor Rabi	1944	PhD; professor
4	Portrait of Hideki Yukawa	Hideki Yukawa	1949	Professor
5	Portrait of Polykarp Kusch	Polykarp Kusch	1955	Professor
6	Portrait of Willis Lamb	Willis Lamb	1955	Professor
7	Portrait of Tsung-Dao Lee	Tsung-Dao Lee	1957	Professor
8	Portrait of Emilio Segrè	Emilio Segrè	1959	Visitor (1935, 1936)
9	Portrait of Maria Mayer	Maria Mayer	1963	Researcher (1942–1945); Manhattan Project (1939–1945)
10	Portrait of Charles Townes	Charles Townes	1964	Professor
11	Portrait of Julian Schwinger	Julian Schwinger	1965	BA, PhD
12	Portrait of Hans Bethe	Hans Bethe	1967	Visiting professor (Spring 1941, 1948)
13	Portrait of Murray Gell-Mann	Murray Gell-Mann	1969	Visiting associate professor (Fall 1954)
14	Portrait of Leon Cooper	Leon Cooper	1972	BA, MA, PhD
15	Portrait of Aage Bohr	Aage Bohr	1975	Visiting Fellow (1949–1950)
16	Portrait of James Rainwater	James Rainwater	1975	MA, PhD; professor
17	Portrait of Samuel Ting	Samuel Ting	1976	Assistant professor (1965–1967) and instructor (1964–1965)
18	Portrait of Arno Penzias	Arno Penzias	1978	MA, PhD
19	Portrait of Steven Weinberg	Steven Weinberg	1979	Instructor (1957–1959)
20	Portrait of Val Fitch	Val Fitch	1980	PhD
21	Portrait of Arthur Schawlow	Arthur Schawlow	1981	Visiting associate professor (1960); fellow and research associate (1949–1951)
22	Portrait of Carlo Rubbia	Carlo Rubbia	1984	Research Fellow (1958–1959)
23	Portrait of Leon Lederman	Leon Lederman	1988	MA, PhD; professor
24		Melvin Schwartz	1988	BA, PhD; professor; research associate
25	Portrait of Jack Steinberger	Jack Steinberger	1988	Professor
26		Norman Foster Ramsey Jr.	1989	BA, PhD; associate professor
27	Portrait of Martin Perl	Martin Perl	1995	PhD
28	Portrait of Horst Störmer	Horst Störmer	1998	Professor
29		Daniel C. Tsui	1998	Adjunct scientist
30	Portrait of John C. Mather	John C. Mather	2006	Lecturer (1975–1976)
31	Portrait of Arthur Ashkin	Arthur Ashkin	2018	BA
32		Giorgio Parisi	2021	Researcher (1973–1974)
33		John Clauser	2022	MA, PhD

=== Nobel laureates in Chemistry ===
Nobel Laureates in Chemistry
No.	Image	Name	Year	Affiliation with Columbia University
1	Portrait of Irving Langmuir	Irving Langmuir	1932	BS
2	Portrait of Harold Urey	Harold Urey	1934	Professor
3	Portrait of John H. Northrop	John H. Northrop	1946	BS, MA, PhD
4		Willard Libby	1960	Head, Chemistry Division of the Columbia University branch of the Manhattan Project (1942–1945)
5	Portrait of Luis Federico Leloir	Luis Leloir	1970	Researcher, College of Physicians and Surgeons at Columbia (1944–1945)
6		William H. Stein	1972	PhD
7	Portrait of Roald Hoffmann	Roald Hoffmann	1981	BA
8	Portrait of Herbert Hauptman	Herbert Hauptman	1985	MA
9	Portrait of Sidney Altman	Sidney Altman	1989	Graduate student in physics
10		William S. Knowles	2001	PhD
11	Portrait of Robert Grubbs	Robert Grubbs	2005	PhD
12	Portrait of Martin Chalfie	Martin Chalfie	2008	Professor
13	Portrait of Robert Lefkowitz	Robert Lefkowitz	2012	BA, MD
14	Portrait of Martin Karplus	Martin Karplus	2013	Professor
15	Portrait of Joachim Frank	Joachim Frank	2017	Professor
16		Louis E. Brus	2023	PhD; professor

=== Nobel laureates in Physiology or Medicine ===
Nobel Laureates in Physiology or Medicine
No.	Image	Name	Year	Affiliation with Columbia University
1	Portrait of Thomas H. Morgan	Thomas H. Morgan	1933	Professor
2	Portrait of Hermann J. Muller	Hermann J. Muller	1946	BA, MA, PhD; instructor in Zoology (1918–1920)
3	Portrait of Edward C. Kendall	Edward C. Kendall	1950	BS, MS, PhD
4	Portrait of André Cournand	André Cournand	1956	Professor
5	Portrait of Dickinson Richards	Dickinson Richards	1956	MD; professor
6	Portrait of Joshua Lederberg	Joshua Lederberg	1958	BA; research assistant
7	Portrait of Konrad Bloch	Konrad Bloch	1965	PhD; researcher
8	Portrait of George Wald	George Wald	1967	PhD
9	Portrait of Salvador Luria	Salvador Luria	1969	Research assistant in Surgical Bacteriology (1940–1942)
10	Portrait of Konrad Lorenz	Konrad Lorenz	1973	Undergraduate attendee (1922, one semester of premedical studies)
11	Portrait of Baruch Blumberg	Baruch Blumberg	1976	MD; medical resident
12	Portrait of Carleton Gajdusek	Carleton Gajdusek	1976	Medical resident at Columbia-Presbyterian Medical Center
13		Daniel Nathans	1978	Intern (1954–1955) and resident (1957–1959) in Medicine, Columbia-Presbyterian Medical Center
14	Portrait of Baruj Benacerraf	Baruj Benacerraf	1980	BS; researcher
15	Portrait of Sune Bergström	Sune Bergström	1982	Research Fellow (1940–1941)
16	Portrait of Harold E. Varmus	Harold Varmus	1989	MD
17	Portrait of Edward Donall Thomas	Donnall Thomas	1990	Physician-in-chief, Mary Imogene Bassett Hospital (1955–1963)
18	Portrait of Louis Ignarro	Louis Ignarro	1998	BA
19	Portrait of Eric Kandel	Eric Kandel	2000	Professor
20	Portrait of Linda Buck	Linda Buck	2004	Postdoctoral researcher (1980–1984)
21	Portrait of Richard Axel	Richard Axel	2004	BA; professor
22		James Rothman	2013	Professor
23		David Julius	2021	Postdoctoral researcher (1984–1990)

=== Nobel Memorial Prize laureates in Economics ===
Nobel Memorial Prize Laureates in Economics
No.	Image	Name	Year	Affiliation with Columbia University
1	Portrait of Simon Kuznets	Simon Kuznets	1971	BS, MA, PhD
2	Portrait of Kenneth Arroww	Kenneth Arrow	1972	MA, PhD
3	Portrait of Milton Friedman	Milton Friedman	1976	PhD; visiting professor
4		George Stigler	1982	Professor
5	Portrait of Franco Modigliani	Franco Modigliani	1985	Instructor at Bard College (1942–1944)
6	Portrait of Robert Solow	Robert Solow	1987	Research Fellow (1949–1950)
7	Portrait of Gary Becker	Gary Becker	1992	Professor
8	Portrait of Robert William Fogel	Robert Fogel	1993	MA
9		William Vickrey	1996	MA, PhD; professor
10	Portrait of Robert C. Merton	Robert C. Merton	1997	BS
11	Portrait of Robert Mundell	Robert Mundell	1999	Professor
12		James Heckman	2000	Associate professor
13	Portrait of Joseph E. Stiglitz	Joseph Stiglitz	2001	Professor; Stern Visiting Professor
14	Portrait of Edmund Phelps	Edmund Phelps	2006	Professor
15	Portrait of Alvin E. Roth	Alvin Roth	2012	BS
16		David Card	2021	Visiting professor (1990–1991)
17		Joshua Angrist	2021	Visiting professor (2018)
18		Michael Woodford	2026	Professor

=== Nobel laureates in Literature ===
Nobel Laureates in Literature
No.	Image	Name	Year	Affiliation with Columbia University
1	Portrait of Gabriela Mistral	Gabriela Mistral	1945	Visiting professor at Barnard College (1930–1931)
2	Portrait of Joseph Brodsky	Joseph Brodsky	1987	Adjunct professor (1978–1985)
3	Portrait of Nadine Gordimer	Nadine Gordimer	1991	Adjunct professor (1971–1972, 1976–1978, 1983)
4	Portrait of Derek Walcott	Derek Walcott	1992	Visiting professor (1979, 1981–1983, 1984)
5	Portrait of Orhan Pamuk	Orhan Pamuk	2006	Professor; visiting scholar
6	Portrait of Louise Glück	Louise Glück	2020	Undergraduate attendee
7	Portrait of László Krasznahorkai	László Krasznahorkai	2025	Writer-in-residence

=== Nobel Peace Prize laureates ===
Nobel Peace Prize Laureates
No.	Image	Name	Year	Affiliation with Columbia University
1	Portrait of Theodore Roosevelt	Theodore Roosevelt	1906	Law student
2	Portrait of Nicholas Butler	Nicholas Butler	1931	BA, MA, PhD; professor; president
3	Portrait of Elie Wiesel	Elie Wiesel	1986	Visiting professor at Barnard College (1997–1999)
4	Portrait of José Ramos-Horta	José Ramos-Horta	1996	Graduate student, SIPA
5	Portrait of Al Gore	Al Gore	2007	Visiting professor (2001)
6	Portrait of Barack Obama	Barack Obama	2009	BA
7		Liu Xiaobo	2010	Visiting scholar (1988–1989)
8	Portrait of Leymah Gbowee	Leymah Gbowee	2011	Distinguished Fellow in Social Justice at Barnard College (2013–2014)
9		Maria Ressa	2021	Professor

== Some visitors not qualified as faculty members ==
Visiting positions such as the "Global Fellowship" of SIPA and "Ernest Kempton Adams (EKA) Lectureship" at Columbia do not require employment-level duties, and thus are excluded from this list. The EKA Fund was established in 1904, enabling Columbia to invite scientists to deliver a series of public lectures.

Affiliates during the Manhattan Project, the scientific research project which developed the first nuclear weapons, who specifically worked for the military are also excluded from this list.

Some visitors not qualified as faculty members
Name	Nobel Prize	Year	Role in Columbia University
Hendrik Lorentz	Physics	1902	EKA Lecturer about a month in the spring of 1906; Lorentz began his lectures on March 23, and gave his final lecture on April 27; later book Theory of Electrons was based on a course of lectures delivered during that period
Wilhelm Wien	Physics	1911	EKA Lecturer (1913); delivered six public lectures in April 1913
Max Planck	Physics	1918	EKA Lecturer (1909); delivered eight public lectures in the spring of 1909
Walter Brattain	Physics	1956	Physicist (1941–1943) at the Division of War Research under National Defense Research Committee, working on magnetic detection of submarines
William Shockley	Physics	1956	Research director (1942–1944) of the Antisubmarine Warfare Operations Research Group (set up by the US Navy Department at Columbia) for military projects
John van Vleck	Physics	1977	Visiting lecturer for summer school (1934)
Kofi Annan	Peace	2001	Global Fellow (Spring 2009), School of International and Public Affairs, for public lectures and seminars

== Notes ==
1. The total number of laureates in natural sciences: Physics, Chemistry, and Physiology or Medicine.
2. This is because, according to Wikipedia policies on no original research and objectivity/neutrality, it is not possible in Wikipedia to subjectively assign various weights to different types of affiliations.
