= Inside New York =

- Categories: Guide Book
- Frequency: 1 per year
- Circulation: 75,000
- First issue: September 1980
- Country: United States
- Language: American English
- Website: www.insidenewyork.com

Inside New York is a New York City guidebook written and published annually by students of several universities, including Columbia University, New York University, The New School and other New York City universities. Founded in 1978 as the Columbia Guide to New York and given exclusively to incoming freshmen, it currently is distributed to several colleges, graduate programs, and businesses throughout New York City, in addition to being sold at independent bookstores and major retailers. Inside New York launched the first electronic edition of the guide book in September 2013.
