= Max Horkheimer =

German philosopher and sociologist (1895–1973)

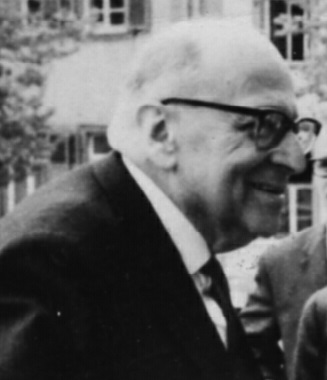
- Horkheimer in 1964
- Born: 14 February 1895; Zuffenhausen (now Stuttgart), Württemberg, German Empire
- Died: 7 July 1973 (aged 78); Nuremberg, Bavaria, West Germany

Education
- Education: Ludwig-Maximilians-Universität München; University of Frankfurt am Main (PhD, 1922; Dr. phil. hab., 1925)
- Doctoral advisor: Hans Cornelius

Philosophical work
- Era: 20th century philosophy
- Region: Western philosophy
- School: Continental philosophy, Frankfurt School critical theory, Western Marxism
- Institutions: University of Frankfurt am Main; Columbia University; University of Chicago
- Main interests: Social theory, Counter-Enlightenment
- Notable ideas: Critical theory as opposed to traditional theory, culture industry, authoritarian personality, eclipse of reason, critique of instrumental reason

Max Horkheimer (/ˈhɔːrkhaɪmər/ HORK-hy-mər; German: [ˈhɔɐ̯kˌhaɪmɐ]; 14 February 1895 – 7 July 1973) was a German Marxist philosopher and sociologist best known for his role in developing critical theory as director of the Institute for Social Research, commonly associated with the Frankfurt School.

Advancing a Historical materialist theory of reason and society, Horkheimer analyzed the rise of instrumental reason, the erosion of the concept of truth, the decline of individual autonomy, the social-psychological roots of authoritarianism, and the reproduction of domination under modern capitalism. He attributed these negative outcomes to the societal effects of the division of labor, and criticized "traditional theory" for its clinical and detached "way of knowing". These perspectives became fundamental to critical theory.

His most influential works include Eclipse of Reason (1947), Dialectic of Enlightenment (1947, with Theodor W. Adorno), and a series of foundational essays written in the 1930s for the Zeitschrift für Sozialforschung, later collected in Between Philosophy and Social Science and Critical Theory: Selected Essays. He also composed aphoristic reflections between the late 1920s and the 1960s, published posthumously as Dämmerung (Dawn and Decline). As director of the institute, Horkheimer planned, supported, and made possible many other significant works.

== Biography ==
=== Early life ===
On 14 February 1895, Horkheimer was born the only son of Moritz and Babetta Horkheimer. Horkheimer was born into a conservative, wealthy Orthodox Jewish family. His father was a successful businessman who owned several textile factories in the Zuffenhausen district of Stuttgart, where Max was born. Moritz expected his son to follow in his footsteps and own the family business.

Max was taken out of school in 1910 to work in the family business, where he eventually became a junior manager. During this period he would begin two relationships that would last for the rest of his life. First, he met Friedrich Pollock, who would later become a close academic colleague, and who would remain Max's closest friend. He also met Rose Riekher, his father's personal secretary. Eight years Max's senior, a Christian, and from a lower economic class, Riekher was not considered a suitable match by Moritz Horkheimer. Despite this, Max and Maidon (as Riekher was affectionately known) would marry in 1926 and remain together until her death in 1969.

In 1917, his manufacturing career ended and his chances of taking over his family business were interrupted when he was drafted into World War I. However, Horkheimer avoided military service, being rejected on medical grounds.

=== Education ===
In the spring of 1919, after failing an army physical, Horkheimer enrolled at the Ludwig-Maximilians-Universität München. While living in Munich, he was mistaken for the revolutionary playwright Ernst Toller and arrested and imprisoned.

After being released, Horkheimer moved to Frankfurt am Main, where he studied philosophy and psychology under Hans Cornelius. There, he met Theodor Adorno, several years his junior, with whom he would strike a lasting friendship and a collaborative relationship. After an abortive attempt at writing a dissertation on Gestalt psychology, Horkheimer, with Cornelius's direction, completed his doctorate in philosophy with a 78-page dissertation titled The Antinomy of Teleological Judgment (Zur Antinomie der teleologischen Urteilskraft). In 1925, Horkheimer was habilitated with a dissertation entitled Kant's Critique of Judgment as Mediation between Practical and Theoretical Philosophy (Über Kants Kritik der Urteilskraft als Bindeglied zwischen theoretischer und praktischer Philosophie). There, he met Friedrich Pollock, who would be his colleague at the University of Frankfurt Institute for Social Research. The following year, Max was appointed Privatdozent. Shortly after, in 1926, Horkheimer married Rose Riekher.

=== Institute of Social Research (Institut für Sozialforschung) ===
In 1926, Horkheimer was an "unsalaried lecturer in Frankfurt". Shortly after, in 1930, he was promoted to professor of philosophy at the University of Frankfurt am Main. In the same year, when the Institute for Social Research's directorship became vacant, after the departure of Carl Grünberg, Horkheimer was elected to the position "by means of an endowment from a wealthy businessman". The Institute had had its beginnings in a Marxist study group started by Felix Weil, a one-time student of political science at Frankfurt who used his inheritance to fund the group as a way to support his leftist academic aims. Pollock and Horkheimer were partners with Weil in the early activities of the institute.

Horkheimer worked to make the Institute a purely academic enterprise. As director, he changed the institute from an orthodox Marxist school to a heterodox school for critical social research. The following year publication of the institute's Zeitschrift für Sozialforschung began, with Horkheimer as its editor.

Horkheimer intellectually reoriented the institute, proposing a programme of collective research aimed at specific social groups (specifically the working class) that would highlight the problem of the relationship between history and reason. The Institute focused on integrating the views of Karl Marx and Sigmund Freud. The Frankfurt School attempted this by systematically hitching together the different conceptual structures of historical materialism and psychoanalysis.

During the time between Horkheimer's being named Professor of Social Philosophy and director of the Institute in 1930, the Nazi party became the second largest party in the Reichstag. In the midst of the violence surrounding the Nazis' rise, Horkheimer and his associates began to prepare for the possibility of moving the Institute out of Germany. Horkheimer's venia legendi was revoked by the new Nazi government because of the Marxian nature of the institute's ideas as well as its prominent Jewish association. When Hitler was named the Chancellor in 1933, the institute was thus forced to close its location in Germany.

He emigrated to Geneva, Switzerland, and then to New York City the following year, where Horkheimer met with president of Columbia University Nicholas Murray Butler to discuss hosting the institute. To Horkheimer's surprise, the president agreed to host the Institute in exile as well as offer Horkheimer a building for the institute. In July 1934, Horkheimer accepted an offer from Columbia University to relocate the institute to one of their buildings.

In 1940, Horkheimer received American citizenship and moved to the Pacific Palisades district of Los Angeles, California, where his collaboration with Adorno would yield the Dialectic of Enlightenment. In 1942, Horkheimer assumed the directorship of the Scientific Division of the American Jewish Committee. In this capacity, he helped launch and organize a series of five Studies in Prejudice, which were published in 1949 and 1950. The most important of these was the pioneering study in social psychology entitled The Authoritarian Personality, itself a methodologically advanced reworking of some of the themes treated in a collective project produced by the Institute in its first years of exile, Studies in Authority and Family.

=== Return to Germany ===
In 1949, he returned to Frankfurt, where the Institute for Social Research reopened in 1950. In the years that followed, Horkheimer did not publish much, although he continued to edit Studies in Philosophy and Social Science as a continuation of the Zeitschrift. Between 1951 and 1953 Horkheimer was rector of the University of Frankfurt am Main. In 1953, Horkheimer stepped down from director of the Institute and took on a smaller role in the institute, while Adorno became director.

Horkheimer continued to teach at the university until his retirement in the mid-1960s. In 1953, he was awarded the Goethe Plaque of the City of Frankfurt, and was later named an honorary citizen of Frankfurt for life. He returned to the United States in 1954 and 1959 to lecture as a frequent visiting professor at the University of Chicago.

=== Personal life and death ===
Max and Maidon married in 1926 and remained together until her death in 1969. They moved to Montagnola, Ticino in 1957. He died after a routine examination in Nuremberg in 1973 and was buried in the Jewish cemetery of Bern next to his wife. In the late 1960s, Horkheimer supported Pope Paul VI's stand against artificial contraception, specifically the pill, arguing that it would lead to the end of romantic love.

=== Legacy ===
He remained an important figure until his death. Max Horkheimer, with the help of Theodor Adorno, Herbert Marcuse, Walter Benjamin, Leo Löwenthal, Otto Kirchheimer, Frederick Pollock and Franz Neumann, developed "Critical Theory". According to Larry Ray "Critical Theory" has "become one of the most influential social theories of the twentieth century".

== Thought ==
Horkheimer's work is marked by a concern to show the relation between affect (especially suffering) and concepts (understood as action-guiding expressions of reason). In that, he responded critically to what he saw as the one-sidedness of both neo-Kantianism (with its focus on concepts) and Lebensphilosophie (with its focus on expression and world-disclosure). He did not think that either was wrong, but he insisted that the insights of each school on its own could not adequately contribute to the repair of social problems. Horkheimer focused on the connections between social structures, networks/subcultures and individual realities and concluded that we are affected and shaped by the proliferation of products on the marketplace. It is also important to note that Horkheimer collaborated with Herbert Marcuse, Erich Fromm, Theodor Adorno, and Walter Benjamin.

=== Critical theory ===
Through critical theory, a social theory focusing on critiquing and changing society, Horkheimer "attempted to revitalize radical social, and cultural criticism" and discussed authoritarianism, militarism, economic disruption, environmental crisis and the poverty of mass culture. Horkheimer helped to create critical theory through a mix of radical and conservative lenses that stem from radical Marxism and end up in "pessimistic Jewish transcendentalism".

He developed his critical theory by examining his own wealth while witnessing the juxtaposition of the bourgeois and the impoverished. This critical theory embraced the future possibilities of society and was preoccupied with forces which moved society toward rational institutions that would ensure a true, free, and just life. He was convinced of the need to "examine the entire material and spiritual culture of mankind" in order to transform society as a whole. Horkheimer sought to enable the working class to reclaim their power in order to resist the lure of fascism. Horkheimer stated himself that "the rationally organized society that regulates its own existence" was necessary along with a society that could "satisfy common needs". To satisfy these needs, it reached out for a total understanding of history and knowledge. Through this, critical theory develops a "critique of bourgeois society through which 'ideology critique' attempted to locate the 'utopian content' of dominant systems of thought". Above all, critical theory sought to develop a critical perspective in the discussion of all social practices.

=== Writing ===
==== Between Philosophy and Social Science ====
Between Philosophy and Social Science appeared between 1930 and 1938, during the time the Frankfurt school moved from Frankfurt to Geneva to Columbia University. It included: "Materialism and Morality", "The Present Situation of Moral Philosophy and the Tasks of an Institute for Social Research", "On the Problem of Truth", "Egoism and the Freedom Movement", "History and Psychology", "A New Concept of Ideology", "Remarks on Philosophical Anthropology", and "The Rationalism Debate in Contemporary Philosophy". It also included "The Present Situation of Social Philosophy and the Tasks for an Institute of Social Research", "Egoism and Freedom Movements" and "Beginnings of the Bourgeois Philosophy of History". The essays within "Between Philosophy and Social Science" were Horkheimer's attempts to "remove the individual from mass culture, a function for philosophy from the commodification of everything". Horkheimer was extremely invested in the individual. In one of his writings, he states, "When we speak of an individual as a historical entity, we mean not merely the space-time and the sense existence of a particular member of the human race, but in addition, his awareness of his own individuality as a conscious human being, including recognition of his own identity."

"The Present Situation of Social Philosophy and the Tasks for an Institute of Social Research" was not only included in this volume, but it was also used as Horkheimer's inaugural speech as director of the Frankfurt School. In this speech he related economic groups to the struggles and challenges of real life. Horkheimer often referenced human struggle and used this example in his speech because it was a topic he understood well.

"Egoism and Freedom Movements" and "Beginnings of the Bourgeois Philosophy of History" are the longest of the essays. The first is an evaluation of Machiavelli, Hobbes and Vico; the latter discusses the bourgeois control. In Beginnings of the Bourgeois Philosophy of History, Horkheimer explained "what he learned from the bourgeois rise to power and what of the bourgeois he thought was worth preserving.

The volume also looks at the individual as the "troubled center of philosophy." Horkheimer expressed that "there is no formula that defines the relationship among individuals, society and nature for all time". To understand the problem of the individual further, Horkheimer included two case studies on the individual: one on Montaigne and one on himself.

==== Eclipse of Reason ====
Horkheimer's book, Eclipse of Reason, started in 1941 and published in 1947, is broken into five sections: Means and Ends, Conflicting Panaceas, The Revolt of Nature, The Rise and Decline of the Individual, and On the Concept of Philosophy. The Eclipse of Reason focuses on the concept of reason within the history of Western philosophy, which can only be fostered in an environment of free, critical thinking while also linking positivist and instrumental reason with the rise of fascism. He distinguishes between objective, subjective and instrumental reason, and states that we have moved from the former through the center and into the latter (though subjective and instrumental reason are closely connected). Objective reason deals with universal truths that dictate that an action is either right or wrong. It is a concrete concept and a force in the world that requires specific modes of behavior. The focus in the objective faculty of reason is on the ends, rather than the means. Subjective reason is an abstract concept of reason, and focuses primarily on means. Specifically, the reasonable nature of the purpose of action is irrelevant – the ends only serve the purpose of the subject (generally self-advancement or preservation). To be "reasonable" in this context is to be suited to a particular purpose, to be "good for something else". This aspect of reason is universally conforming, and easily furnishes ideology. In instrumental reason, the sole criterion of reason is its operational value or purposefulness, and with this, the idea of truth becomes contingent on mere subjective preference (hence the relation with subjective reason). Because subjective/instrumental reason rules, the ideals of a society, for example democratic ideals, become dependent on the "interests" of the people instead of being dependent on objective truths. Horkheimer writes, "Social power is today more than ever mediated by power over things. The more intense an individual's concern with power over things, the more will things dominate him, the more will he lack any genuine individual traits, and the more will his mind be transformed into an automation of formalized reason."

Horkheimer acknowledges that objective reason has its roots in Reason ("Logos" in Greek) and concludes, "If by enlightenment and intellectual progress we mean the freeing of man from superstitious belief in evil forces, in demons and fairies, in blind fate – in short, the emancipation from fear – then denunciation of what is currently called reason is the greatest service we can render."

==== Dialectic of Enlightenment ====
Max Horkheimer and Theodor Adorno collaborated to publish Dialectic of Enlightenment, which was originally published in 1944. The inspiration for this piece came from when Horkheimer and Adorno had to flee Germany, because of Hitler, and go to New York. They went to America and "absorbed the popular culture"; thinking that it was a form of totalitarianism. Nonetheless, Dialectic of Enlightenment's main argument was to serve as a wide-ranging critique of the "self-destruction of enlightenment". The work criticized popular culture as "the product of a culture industry whose goal was to stupefy the masses with endless mass produced copies of the same thing" (Lemert). Along with that, Horkheimer and Adorno had a few arguments; one being that these mass-produced products only appear to change over time. Horkheimer and Adorno stated that these products were so standardized in order to help consumers comprehend and appreciate the products with little attention given to them. They expressed, "the result is a constant reproduction of the same thing" (Adorno and Horkheimer, 1993 [1944]). However, they also explain how pseudo-individuality is encouraged among these products in order to keep the consumers coming back for more. They argue that small differences in products within the same area are acceptable.

The similar patterns found in the content of popular culture (films, popular songs and radio) have the same central message; "it's all linked to "the necessity of obedience of the masses to the social hierarchy in place in advanced capitalist societies". These products appeal to the masses and encourage conformity to the consumers. In return, capitalism remains in power while buyers continue to consume from the industry. This is dangerous because the consumers' belief that the powers of technology are liberating, starts to increase. To support their claim, Horkheimer and Adorno, "proposed an antidote: not just thinking the relations of things, but also, as an immediate second step, thinking through that thinking, self-reflexively." In other words, technology lacks self-reflexivity. Nonetheless, Horkheimer and Adorno believed that art was an exception, because it "is an open-ended system with no fixed rules"; thus, it could not be an object of the industry.

== Criticisms ==
Perry Anderson sees Horkheimer's attempt to make the Institute purely academic as "symptomatic of a more universal process, the emergence of a 'Western Marxism' divorced from the working-class movement and dominated by academic philosophers and the 'product of defeat'" because of the isolation of the Russian Revolution. Rolf Wiggershaus, author of The Frankfurt School, believed Horkheimer lacked the audacious theoretical construction produced by those like Marx and Lukács and that his main argument was that those living in misery had the right to material egoism. In his book, "Social Theory", Alex Callinicos claims that Dialectic of Enlightenment offers no systematic account of conception of rationality, but rather professes objective reason intransigently to an extent. Charles Lemert discusses in his book Social Theory that in writing Dialectic of Enlightenment, Horkheimer and Adorno lack sufficient sympathy for the cultural plight of the average working person, unfair to criticize the tastes of ordinary people, and that popular culture does not really buttress social conformity and stabilize capitalism as much as the Frankfurt school thinks.

Ingar Solty, in a February 2020 Jacobin magazine article, notes that the work of Horkheimer, Adorno, and the Frankfurt School as a whole is marked by "the vast historical defeats suffered by the interwar socialist movement." He notes, "Horkheimer and Adorno thus became increasingly pessimistic with regards to the working class's ability to overthrow capitalism ... Horkheimer did not conduct empirical research on capitalism and its crises ... the hierarchical nature of the international division of labor, the organization of internationalizing capitalism in a system of nation-states, the origins of imperialism and inter-imperial rivalries, or such ... For Horkheimer, the working class had been a revolutionary subject only in the abstract ... [it] was essentially an empty placeholder for the subject which would overthrow an economic and social system which they considered wrong. If it failed to live up to its expectations, then it could easily be replaced by another subject of revolution—or the conclusion that there was no way out (of capitalism)."

Solty contextualizes Horkheimer's (and, by implication, the Frankfurt School's) "return from 'revolutionary optimism' to 'revolutionary pessimism'" by noting, "[m]any postwar radical leftists and anti-capitalists, especially those not organized in real workers' parties, were disappointed revolutionaries. The German writer Alfred Andersch, who had been close to the KPD before 1933 and then withdrawn into "inner emigration," called the West German postwar left a "homeless left." The working classes' betrayals seemed to continue after 1945. After the short-lived socialist revival, the Cold War and the internationalization of the New Deal as the Keynesian welfare state seemed to have completely absorbed what was left of revolutionary working-class spirit. This led many disappointed leftists to culture and ideology as levels of analyses which could explain this failure of the working class." Solty identifies Horkheimer's (and, implicitly, the Frankfurt School's) work as an important influence on that of Michel Foucault:

Ultimately, both Horkheimer and Foucault only considered the defense of remaining elements of freedom and the identification of "micro-powers" of domination a possibility, but changes in the macro-power structures were out of reach. In other words, a Left was born that was no longer oriented toward "counter-hegemony" (as per Antonio Gramsci), as a way of building toward power, but rather "anti-hegemony" (Horkheimer, Foucault, etc.), as John Sanbonmatsu put it in his critique of postmodernism.

== Selected works ==
=== Books ===
- Authority and the Family (1936)
- Traditional and Critical Theory (1937)
- Dialectic of Enlightenment (1947) – with Theodor Adorno ISBN 978-0-8264-0093-2
- Eclipse of Reason (1947) (orig. 1941 "The End of Reason", Studies in Philosophy and Social Sciences, Vol. IX) ISBN 978-1-4437-3041-9
- Egoism and the Freedom Movement
- The Longing for the Totally Other
- Critique of Instrumental Reason (1967) ISBN 978-0-8264-0088-8
- Critical Theory: Selected Essays (1972) ISBN 978-0-8264-0083-3
- Dawn & Decline (1978) ISBN 978-0-8164-9329-6
- His collected works have been issued in German as Max Horkheimer: Gesammelte Schriften (1985–1996). 19 volumes, edited by Alfred Schmidt and Gunzelin Schmid Noerr. S. Fischer Verlag, Frankfurt am Main.
- A life in letters : selected correspondence / Max Horkheimer ; edited, translated, and with an introduction by Manfred R. Jacobson and Evelyn M. Jacobson. Lincoln : University of Nebraska Press, 2007. ISBN 9780803224308
- Dialectic of Enlightenment / Max Horkheimer, Theodor W. Adorno, Gunzelin Schmid Noeri. Stanford, CA : Stanford University Press, 2020. ISBN 9780804788090

=== Articles ===
- "The social function of philosophy", in Studies in Philosophy and Social Science, vol. 8, n°3, New-York, 1939.
- "The Authoritarian State". 15 (Spring 1973). New York: Telos Press.
