= Columbia MM =

Columbia MM (Mail Manager) is an email client using a command-line interface. It was developed at Columbia University between 1984 and 1990, and is a Unix reimplementation of a 1978 TOPS-20 email program, also known as MM, which in turn was an update of an earlier program by Mike McMahon of SRI International. Columbia MM has also been built on other platforms, including MS-DOS and VMS.

MM was unusual for its time in its support of "message sequences," which allowed the user to select a subset of messages in a mailbox for batch operations. The message sequence feature proved so popular with MM users that TOPS-20 MM author Mark Crispin went on to implement similar filtering capabilities in Pine. Columbia MM also offered context-sensitive help, command completion, and command history, carried over from the TOPS-20 version, before such features were commonplace in Unix software.

After a lull in development in 1990, MM development picked up again in 2002 with an interim release, including changes for Linux portability and POP support.

== History ==
At Columbia University in the late 1970s, the DEC-20 based MM was adopted in favor of DEC-20 MAIL and RDMAIL, and was used initially among the programming staff. Its use spread to the students and faculty, to the extent that several courses came to use it heavily. It was likely that, if one did a SYSTAT on any DEC-20 at Columbia between 1978 and 1988, they would see about half the users running emacs and the other half MM, with only occasional time out for text formatting, program compilation, and file transfer. When Columbia switched to Unix-based platforms during the 1980s the MM program was rewritten for that platform and development continued on the program for the next 20 years.

As of version 0.91 (2003), MM worked on the following platforms: Solaris (2.5.1 and later); SunOS 4.1; Linux (e.g. RH7.1); FreeBSD 4.4; OpenBSD 3.0, NetBSD 1.5.2.

== See also ==
- Brief tutorial showing basic commands from 1997
