= Journal of Politics & Society =

- Discipline: Social sciences
- Language: English

Publication details
- Former name(s): Columbia University Journal of Law and Public Policy
- History: 1989–present
- Publisher: Helvidius Group (United States)
- Frequency: Biannual

Standard abbreviations
- ISO 4: J. Politics Soc.

Indexing
- ISSN: 1555-7359
- LCCN: 2004255117
- OCLC no.: 54849951

Links
- Journal homepage; Online archives

The Journal of Politics & Society is a biannual academic journal covering the social sciences published by the Helvidius Group, a nonprofit student organization at Columbia University. It was established in 1989 by Columbia University student Peter Tomassi as a magazine distributed to schools in the Ivy League and the US Congress. It was originally called the Columbia University Journal of Law and Public Policy and was intended to provide undergraduates a platform for meaningful political discourse without regard to partisanship.

== History ==
The Journal of Politics & Society was originally founded as the Helvidius Group, established in 1989 by Peter Tomassi (CC ’91), to provide a forum for undergraduate discourse on issues concerning law and public policy in the form of a publication. The Journal of Politics & Society is the realization of that mission.

Originally an annual magazine distributed to Ivy League universities and to members of Congress, the Journal has adopted a more scholarly focus and has grown to encompass all of the social sciences. Now in its thirty-fifth year, the Journal only published academic papers submitted by undergraduates. In a process comparable to the peer review and editing procedures of professional academic journals, selected papers are rigorously edited by the Editorial Board, itself composed exclusively of Columbia University undergraduates.

Over its history, Journal has featured the works of noted public figures and scholars in addition to fine undergraduate scholarship. Past contributors include United Nations Secretary-General Kofi Annan, President Bill Clinton, New Jersey Governor and EPA Administrator Christie Todd Whitman, former Secretary of Defense William Cohen, Senator Elizabeth Dole, Secretary of State Hillary Rodham Clinton, the late Senator Daniel Patrick Moynihan, former World Bank President James D. Wolfensohn, Human Rights Watch President Kenneth Roth, Anthony Marx, and Kenneth Waltz.

Leadership on the Journal has also provided counsel and guidance to emerging undergraduate and graduate academic journals such as those at the United States Military Academy, Tbilisi State University in Georgia, and Columbia University. The Journal is not affiliated with or sponsored by any political organization, and it remains staunchly nonpartisan. It welcomes the questions of students looking to establish or develop similar publications at their institutions.

Following troubles in large part due to the COVID-19 pandemic, the current iteration of the Journal was reconstituted in 2022 by Jaehee Cho (Co-Editor-in-Chief, Class of 2023), Samuel Braun (Co-Editor-in-Chief, Class of 2024), Susan Li (Lead Senior Editor, Class of 2023), Ariella Mitchel (Business Director, Class of 2024), Sophie Hanin (Outreach Director, Class of 2024), Madelyn Elisondo (Secretary, Barnard College Class of 2025), and Alisha Arshad (Technology Director, Class of 2024). This website was redesigned by Samuel Braun and Jaehee Cho.

== The Guest Essay ==
The guest essay, the only segment written by non-undergraduates, contextualizes the research in the journal within the broader sociopolitical dialogue.

Past contributors include:

- Bill Clinton, former president of the United States
- Kofi Annan, former United Nations Secretary-General
- Christine Todd Whitman, former New Jersey Governor and EPA Administrator
- William Cohen, former Secretary of Defense
- Elizabeth Dole, former United States Senator
- Hillary Clinton, former first lady, United States Senator, and United States Secretary of State
- Daniel Patrick Moynihan, former United States Senator
- James D. Wolfensohn, former president of the World Bank
- Kenneth Roth, Executive Director of Human Rights Watch
- Anthony Marx, President and CEO of the New York Public Library
- Kenneth Waltz, former political scientist and founder of neorealism in international relations theory
- Andrew J. Nathan, professor at Columbia University
