= Mary Imogene Bassett Hospital =

Health care system in central New York State, United States

Bassett Healthcare Network

Geography
- Location: Cooperstown, New York, United States
- Coordinates: 42.6956°N 74.9237°W

Organization
- Type: Teaching
- Affiliated university: Columbia University

Services
- Emergency department: Level III trauma center
- Beds: 180

Helipads
- Helipad: Yes (FAA LID: 3NK2)
Number	Length		Surface
Number	ft	m	Surface
H1	80 x 80	24 x 24	concrete

History
- Former name: Mary Imogene Bassett Hospital
- Opened: June 1922

Links
- Website: www.bassett.org
- Lists: Hospitals in New York State

The Mary Imogene Bassett Hospital (Bassett Medical Center) is a teaching hospital in Cooperstown, New York. The hospital opened in June 1922. The hospital has 180 beds. It is associated with Columbia University. It is home to the Bassett Cancer Institute.

== History ==
Some of the early work on bone marrow transplants was performed here by Nobel Prize winner E. Donnall Thomas and his wife Dottie Thomas. Joseph Wiley Ferrebee was also a transplant scientist working at the hospital.

The Bassett Healthcare Network runs this hospital and six others, including:

- A.O. Fox Memorial Hospital in Oneonta and Tri-Town Campus
- Bassett Hospital in Schoharie
- Cobleskill Regional Hospital in Cobleskill
- Little Falls Hospital in Little Falls
- O’Connor Hospital in Delhi

== Publishing ==
The hospital has published a number of works including

- Clinical Miscelleny vols 1 & 2, 1930s

== Designations ==
- ACS-verified Level III Trauma Center
- Primary Stroke Center
- Level I Perinatal Center
