= E. Donnall Thomas =

American hematologist

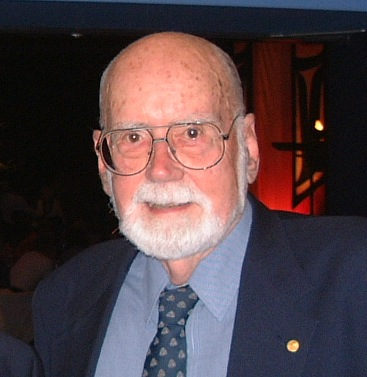
- Thomas in 2000
- Born: Edward Donnall Thomas; March 15, 1920; Mart, Texas, U.S.
- Died: October 20, 2012 (aged 92); Seattle, Washington, U.S.
- Education: University of Texas at Austin (BA, MA); Harvard University (MD)
- Known for: Transplantation
- Awards: Nobel Prize in Physiology or Medicine; National Medal of Science
- Scientific career
- Fields: Medicine
- Workplaces: Mary Imogene Bassett Hospital
- Notable students: Eloise Giblett

Edward Donnall "Don" Thomas (March 15, 1920 – October 20, 2012) was an American physician, professor emeritus at the University of Washington, and director emeritus of the clinical research division at the Fred Hutchinson Cancer Research Center. In 1990 he shared the Nobel Prize in Physiology or Medicine with Joseph E. Murray for the development of cell and organ transplantation. Thomas and his wife and research partner Dottie Thomas developed bone marrow transplantation as a treatment for leukemia.

Thomas was a lead investigator in a failed series of experimental treatments for leukemia and for Graft-versus-host disease at Seattle's Fred Hutchinson Cancer Research Center from 1981 to 1993. Participants were not informed that Thomas and other researchers had a potential financial conflict of interest in the trials, and were never properly informed of the risks. The study continued despite objections from members of the Center’s Internal Review Board. 84 of the 85 participants in the study died.

== Biography ==
Born in Mart, Texas, Thomas often shadowed his father who was a general practice doctor. Later, he attended the University of Texas at Austin where he studied chemistry and chemical engineering, graduating with a Bachelor of Arts in 1941 and a Master's degree in 1943. While Thomas was an undergraduate he met his wife, Dorothy (Dottie) Martin while she was training to be journalist. They had three children. Thomas entered Harvard Medical School in 1943, receiving a Doctor of Medicine in 1946. Dottie became a lab technician during this time to support the family, and the pair worked closely thereafter. He did his residency at Peter Bent Brigham Hospital before serving two years in the United States Army as an internist stationed in Germany. "In 1955, he was appointed physician in chief at the Mary Imogene Bassett Hospital, now Bassett Medical Center, in Cooperstown, New York, an affiliate of Columbia University."

At Mary Imogene Bassett, he began to study rodents that received lethal doses of radiation who were then saved by an infusion of marrow cells. At the time, patients who underwent bone marrow transplantation all died from infections or immune reactions that weren't seen in the rodent studies. Thomas began to use dogs as a model system. In 1963, he moved his lab to the United States Public Health Service in Seattle.

Thomas also received National Medal of Science in 1990. In 2003 he was one of 22 Nobel laureates who signed the Humanist Manifesto.

He died of heart failure.

== Awards and honors ==
- 1965-1969 Hematology Study Section, National Institutes of Health
- 1969-1973 Member, Board of Trustees and Medical and Scientific Advisory Committee, Leukemia Society of America, Inc.
- 1970-1974 Clinical Cancer Investigation Review Committee, National Cancer Institute
- 1974 First Annual Eugene C. Eppinger Lecture at Peter Bent Brigham Hospital and the Harvard Medical School
- 1975 A. Ross McIntyre Award, University of Nebraska Medical Center
- 1975 The Henry M. Stratton Lecture, American Society of Hematology, Dallas
- 1977 The Lilly Lecture, Royal College of Physicians, London
- 1979 The Philip Levine Award, American Society of Clinical Pathologists, New Orleans
- 1980 American Cancer Society Award for Distinguished Service in Basic Research
- 1981 Kettering Prize of the General Motors Cancer Research Foundation for contributions to the diagnosis and treatment of cancer
- 1981 Honorary Doctorate of Medicine, University of Cagliari, Sardinia
- 1981 Special Keynote Address Award, American Society of Therapeutic Radiologists
- 1982 Stratton Lecture, International Society of Hematology
- 1982 Paul Aggeler Lecturer, University of California, San Francisco
- 1983 David A. Karnofsky Memorial Lecturer, Annual Meeting of the American Society of Clinical Oncology
- 1983 Robert Roesler de Villiers Award, Leukemia Society of American
- 1984 Sixty-fifth Mellon Lecturer, University of Pittsburgh School of Medicine, May 13
- 1985 Stanley Wright Memorial Lecturer, Annual Meeting of the Western Society for Pediatric Research
- 1987 Karl Landsteiner Memorial Award, Annual Meeting of the American Association of Blood Banks,
- 1987-1988 President, American Society of Hematology
- 1989 Elected Corresponding Member, Academie Royale de Medecine de Belgigue
- 1990 Terry Fox Award, Canada
- 1990 Gairdner Foundation International Award
- 1990 North American Medical Association of Hong Kong Prize
- 1990 Nobel Prize in Medicine
- 1990 Presidential Medal of Science
- 1991 Adolfo Ferrata Lecture, Italian Society of Hematology, Verona, Italy
- 1991 Honorary Doctorate of Medicine, University of Verona
- 1992 Kober Medal, American Association of Physicians
- 1992 Honorary Member, The Royal College of Physicians and Surgeons of Canada
- 1992 Honorary Doctorate of Medicine, University of Parma
- 1993 Golden Plate Award of the American Academy of Achievement
- 1994 Honorary Member, National Academia of Medicine
- 1994 Honorary Degree, University of Barcelona
- 1996 Honorary Degree, University of Warsaw
- 1998 Medal of Merit, State of Washington
