= Dottie Thomas =

American hematologist

- Born: Dorothy Martin; September 18, 1922; San Antonio, Texas, United States
- Died: January 9, 2015 (aged 92); Seattle, Washington, United States
- Known for: Transplantation
- Scientific career
- Fields: Medicine
- Workplaces: Fred Hutchinson Cancer Research Center

Dorothy "Dottie" Thomas (née Martin) (San Antonio, Texas, September 18, 1922 – Seattle, January 9, 2015) was an American hematology researcher and administrator known for her work in developing bone marrow transplants. She and her husband, Edward Donnall Thomas, partnered to research leukemia and other blood disorders, and developed the technique for transplanting bone marrow. Her husband was awarded a Nobel Prize in Physiology or Medicine in 1990 due to his discoveries about cell and organ transplantation in the treatment of human diseases that he had completed along with Dorothy. This Nobel Prize was shared with Joseph Edward Murray, an American plastic surgeon.

== Early life and education ==
Dorothy Elaine Martin was born and raised in Texas, attending public school in her hometown of San Antonio throughout her childhood. She studied journalism at the University of Texas at Austin. Heavy snow showers changed her future after she threw a snowball that crashed into a senior student of chemistry, Edward Donnall Thomas.

The couple got married in December 1942 and in 1943 Edward Donnall Thomas was admitted to Harvard Medical School from the Army of the United States.

== Career and research ==
After the admission of her husband to the Harvard Medical School, Dorothy decided to switch to medicine in 1943 and moved to New England Deaconess Hospital, where she realized a medical technology training and she qualified as a hematology technician. Thomas graduated from medical technology training in the 1940s and worked as a technician for other physicians while her husband completed his degree and got his laboratory. Dorothy Thomas worked part time in her husband's lab while their children were young. In the 1950s, Donnall became physician-in-chief at Mary Imogene Bassett Hospital in Cooperstown, New York, and the work on bone marrow transplant began. In 1963 they moved to Seattle and continued their research at the University of Washington School of Medicine. Since the beginning of 1975, they conducted research together at Seattle's Fred Hutchinson Cancer Research Center beginning in 1975, when it was founded and where she was, for fifteen years, chief administrator of the clinical research division, of which Donnall was the director. During her investigation in the Fred Hutchinson Cancer Research Center, Dorothy Thomas drew blood from patients, realized lab works, and edited and corrected every scientific article that was made by the team of the center. Moreover, as chief administrator of the center and in support of her husband, she managed the team, budgets, and schedules.

Throughout the 1950s Donnall, Dorothy's husband, successfully performed the first bone marrow transplant. Moreover, the transplant team became one of the first options for bone marrow transplants.

== Last years ==
Dorothy was the editor of the book Bone Marrow Transplantation that her husband wrote in 1994. In addition to her administrative and scientific duties, she also took care of her children.

In 2012, in honor of the 90th birthday of Dorothy Thomas, the Spanish tenor, José Carreras, held a charity concert in the Benaroya Hall of Seattle, recalling the 25th anniversary of the first bone marrow transplant in Fred Hutchinson center. With this concert, they earned a significant amount of money which was earmarked for the study of leukemia in Barcelona.

In addition, her daughter, Elaine Thomas, who is a physicist and teacher at the University of New Mexico, explained that her mother was brilliant and she could have achieved many goals, nevertheless, at that time, she had to stay with her husband.

== Recognition ==
When Donnall Thomas was awarded a Nobel Prize in 1990 for the couple's work, this prize was also shared with Joseph Edward Murray, who responded "I'm pleased for my wife and for me and for my team and for the cancer center."

George Santos, a transplant specialist, remarked that if Donnall Thomas was considered the father of bone marrow transplants, "then Dottie Thomas was the mother".

== Legacy ==
In 2014, Dorothy Thomas became a major benefactor of the Fred Hutchinson Center where she created a financial endowment called Dottie's Bridge with the intention to boost young researchers with fellowships. Dorothy was closely tied to science until her death in the year 2015.
