= Columbia University =

Private university in New York City, New York, US

Columbia University in the City of New York
- Coat of arms
- Latin: Universitas Columbiae
- Former names: King's College (1754–1784); Columbia College (1784–1896)
- Motto: In lumine Tuo videbimus lumen (Latin)
- Motto in English: "In Thy light shall we see light"
- Type: Private research university
- Established: May 25, 1754; 272 years ago
- Founder: George II of Great Britain
- Accreditation: MSCHE
- Academic affiliations: AAU; NAICU; URA; space-grant
- Endowment: $17.9 billion (2026)
- President: Jennifer Mnookin
- Provost: Angela Olinto
- Faculty: 4,628
- Students: 36,649
- Undergraduates: 9,761
- Postgraduates: 26,888
- Location: New York City, United States; 40°48′27″N 73°57′43″W
- Campus: 299 acres (1.21 km^{2}); Large city
- Newspaper: Columbia Daily Spectator
- Colors: Columbia blue and white
- Nickname: Lions
- Sporting affiliations: NCAA Division I FCS – Ivy League; EARC; IRA; EAWRC
- Mascot: Roar-ee the Lion
- Website: columbia.edu

Columbia University in the City of New York, commonly referred to as Columbia University, is a private Ivy League research university in New York City. Established in 1754 as King's College by royal charter under George II of Great Britain on the grounds of Trinity Church in Manhattan, it is the oldest institution of higher education in New York and the fifth-oldest in the United States.

The university was renamed Columbia College in 1784 following the American Revolution, and in 1787 was placed under a private board of trustees headed by former students Alexander Hamilton and John Jay. In 1896, the campus was renamed Columbia University. The following year, it moved to its current location in Morningside Heights, Manhattan.

Columbia is organized into 17 schools, two affiliated colleges – Barnard College and Teachers College – and two affiliated seminaries – Jewish Theological Seminary (JTS) and Union Theological Seminary (UTS). The university's research efforts include the Lamont–Doherty Earth Observatory, the Goddard Institute for Space Studies, and accelerator laboratories with Big Tech firms such as Amazon and IBM. Columbia is a founding member of the Association of American Universities and was the first school in the United States to grant the MD degree. The university also administers and annually awards the Pulitzer Prize.

As of December 2021, its alumni, faculty, and staff have included seven of the Founding Fathers of the United States of America; (Note: Founding Fathers include five alumni: Alexander Hamilton, John Jay, Robert R. Livingston, Egbert Benson, and Gouverneur Morris. Additionally, Founding Fathers George Clinton and William Samuel Johnson served as presidents of the university.) four U.S. presidents; (Note: Three presidents have attended Columbia: Theodore Roosevelt, Franklin D. Roosevelt, and Barack Obama. Dwight D. Eisenhower served as the president of the university from 1948 to 1953.) 34 foreign heads of state or government; (Note: Alumni who served as foreign heads of state or government include: Muhammad Fadhel al-Jamali (Iraq, 1953–54), Kassim Rimawi (Jordan, 1980), Giuliano Amato (Italy, 1992–1993 and 2000–2001), Hafizullah Amin (Afghanistan, 1979), Nahas Angula (Namibia, 2005–12), Marek Belka (Poland, 2004–05), Chen Gongbo (China, 1944–45), Włodzimierz Cimoszewicz (Poland, 1996–97), Gaston Eyskens (Belgium, 1949–50, 1958–61 and 1968–73), Mark Eyskens (Belgium, 1981), Ashraf Ghani (Afghanistan, 2014–21), José Ramos-Horta (East Timor, 2007–12 and 2022– ), Toomas Hendrik Ilves (Estonia, 2006–16), Wellington Koo (China 1926–27), Lee Huan (Taiwan, 1989–90), Benjamin Mkapa (Tanzania, 1995–2005), Mohammad Musa Shafiq (Afghanistan, 1972–73), Nwafor Orizu (Nigeria, 1965–6), Santiago Peña (Paraguay, 2023–present), Mikheil Saakashvili (Georgia, 2004–13), Juan Bautista Sacasa (Nicaragua, 1933–36), Salim Ahmed Salim (Tanzania, 1984–85), Ernesto Samper (Colombia, 1994–98), T. V. Soong (China, 1945–47), Sun Fo (China, 1932; Taiwan, 1948–49), C. R. Swart (South Africa, 1959–67), Tang Shaoyi (China, 1912), Abdul Zahir (Afghanistan, 1971–72), and Zhou Ziqi (China, 1922). Faculty and fellows include Fernando Henrique Cardoso (Brazil, 1995–2002), Alfred Gusenbauer (Austria, 2007–2008), Václav Havel (Czechoslovakia, 1989–1992; Czech Republic, 1993–2003), Lucas Papademos (Greece, 2011–2012), Mary Robinson (Ireland, 1990–1997).) two secretaries-general of the United Nations; (Note: Boutros Boutros-Ghali taught as a Fulbright Research Scholar from 1954 to 1955. Kofi Annan was a global fellow at SIPA from 2009 to 2018.) 10 justices of the United States Supreme Court; 103 Nobel laureates; 125 National Academy of Sciences members; 53 living billionaires; 23 Olympic medalists; 33 Academy Award winners; and 125 Pulitzer Prize recipients. Columbia scientists and scholars have played pivotal roles in scientific breakthroughs including brain–computer interface; the laser and maser; nuclear magnetic resonance; the first nuclear pile; the first nuclear fission reaction in the Americas; the first evidence for plate tectonics and continental drift; and much of the initial research and planning for the Manhattan Project during World War II.

== History ==
=== 18th century ===
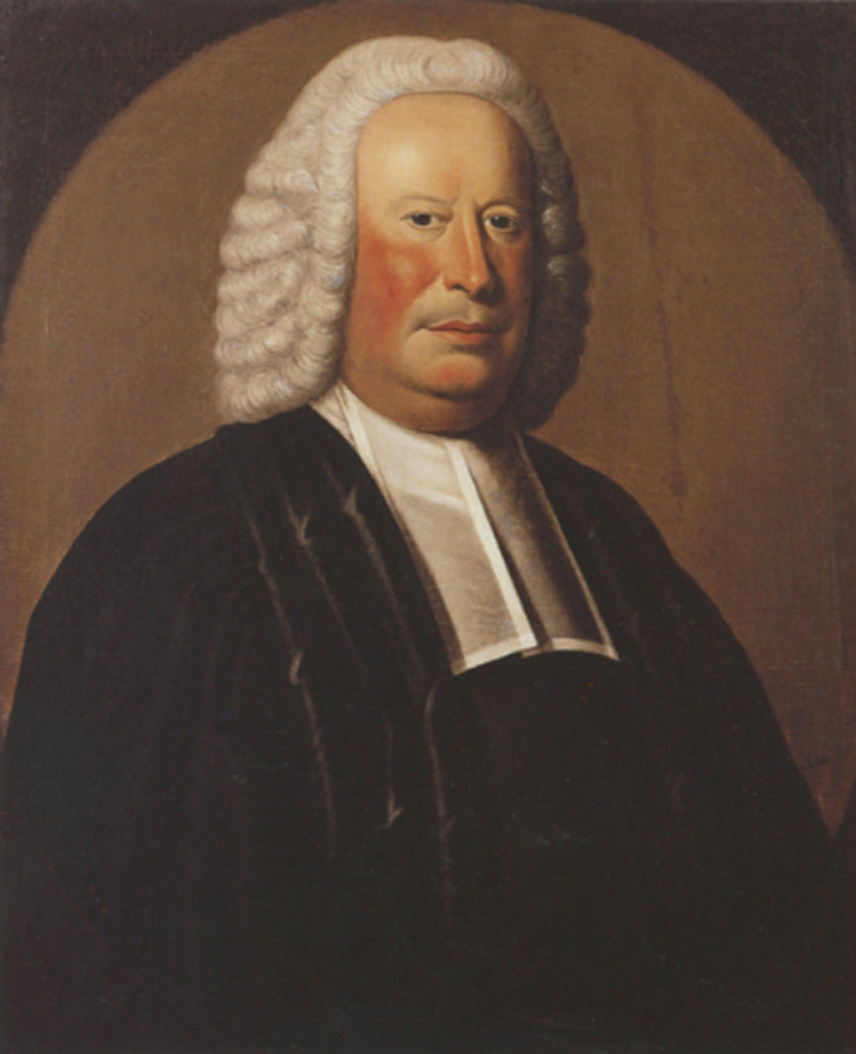
Samuel Johnson, the first president of Columbia

Discussions regarding the founding of a college in the Province of New York began as early as 1704. Classes were initially held in July 1754 and were presided over by the college's first president, Samuel Johnson. The college was officially founded on October 31, 1754, as King's College by royal charter of George II, making it the oldest institution of higher learning in the State of New York and the fifth oldest in the United States.

In 1763, Johnson was succeeded in the presidency by Myles Cooper, a graduate of The Queen's College, Oxford, and an ardent Tory. In the charged political climate of the American Revolution, his chief opponent in discussions at the college was an undergraduate of the class of 1777, Alexander Hamilton. The Irish anatomist, Samuel Clossy, was appointed professor of natural philosophy in October 1765 and later the college's first professor of anatomy in 1767.

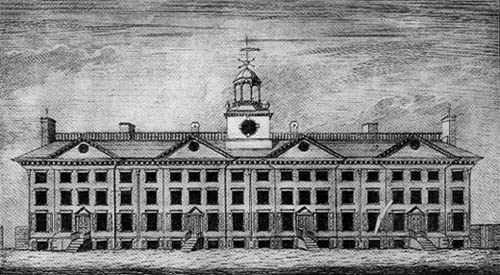
King's College Hall in 1790

Following the start of the American Revolutionary War and the arrival of Continental Army in 1776, the school suspended instruction for eight years. The suspension continued through the military occupation of New York City by British troops until their departure in 1783. During this time, the college's library was looted and its sole building requisitioned for use as a barracks and military hospital first by American and then British forces.

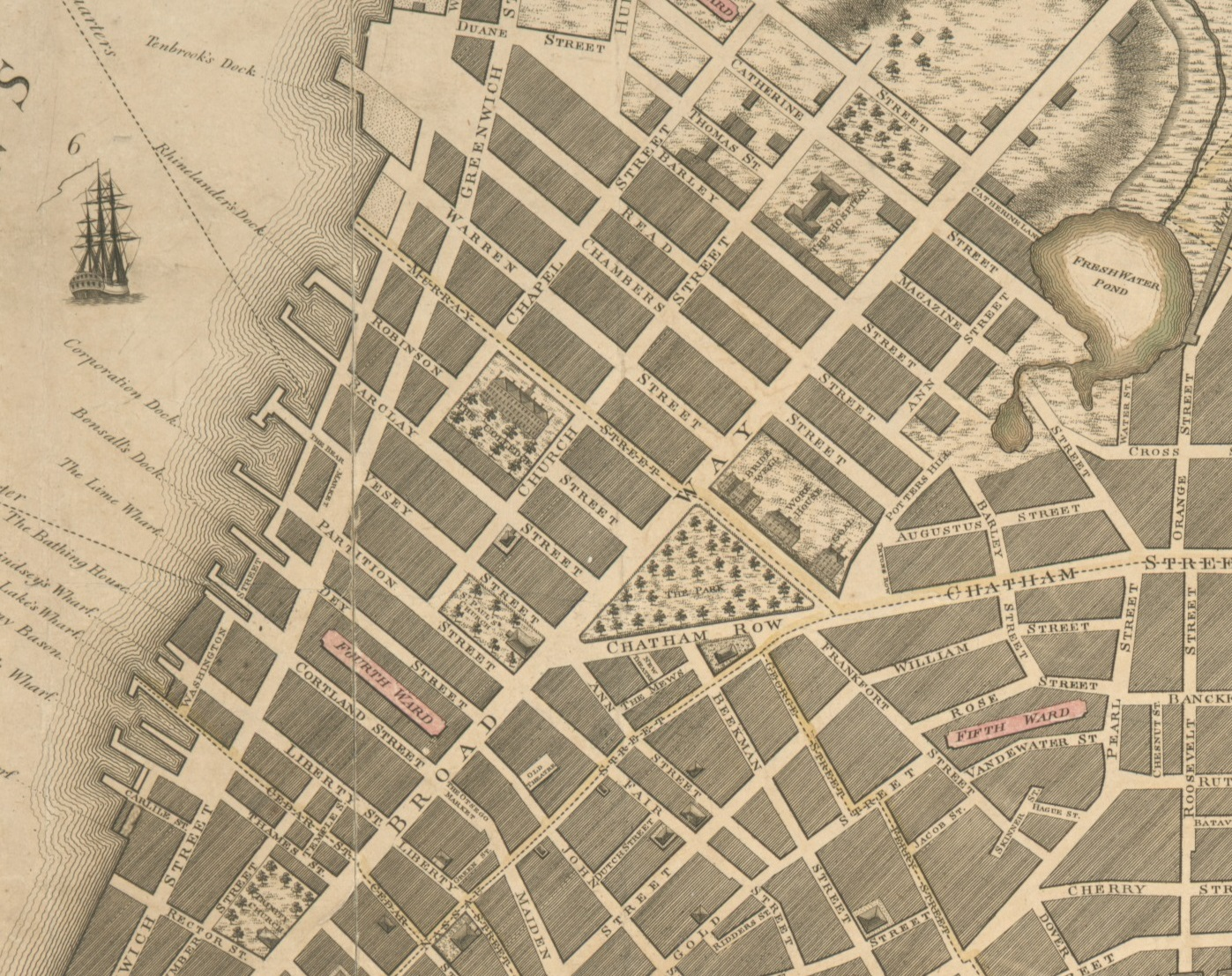
The 1797 Taylor Map of New York City, showing "The Colledge [sic]" at its Park Place (then Robinson Street) location and its earlier location, Trinity Church, on the lower left

The legislature agreed to assist the college. On May 1, 1784, it passed "an Act for granting certain privileges to the College heretofore called King's College". The Act created a board of regents to oversee the resuscitation of King's College. In an effort to demonstrate its support for the new Republic, the legislature stipulated that "the College within the City of New York heretofore called King's College be forever hereafter called and known by the name of Columbia College." In February 1787, the Regents appointed a revision committee, which was headed by John Jay and Alexander Hamilton. In April of that same year, a new charter was adopted for the college granted the power to a separate board of 24 trustees. For a period in the 1790s, with New York City as the federal and state capital and the country under successive Federalist governments, a revived Columbia operated under Federalists such as Hamilton and Jay. President George Washington and Vice President John Adams, in addition to both houses of Congress attended the college's commencement on May 6, 1789, as a tribute of honor to the alumni of the school who had been involved in the American Revolution.

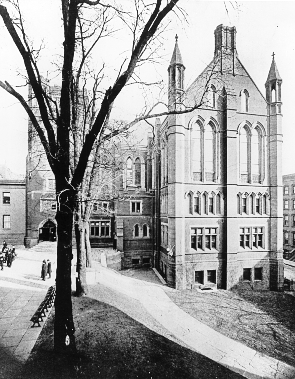
The library and law school buildings, both constructed in a Gothic Revival style, on the Madison Avenue campus

=== 19th century ===
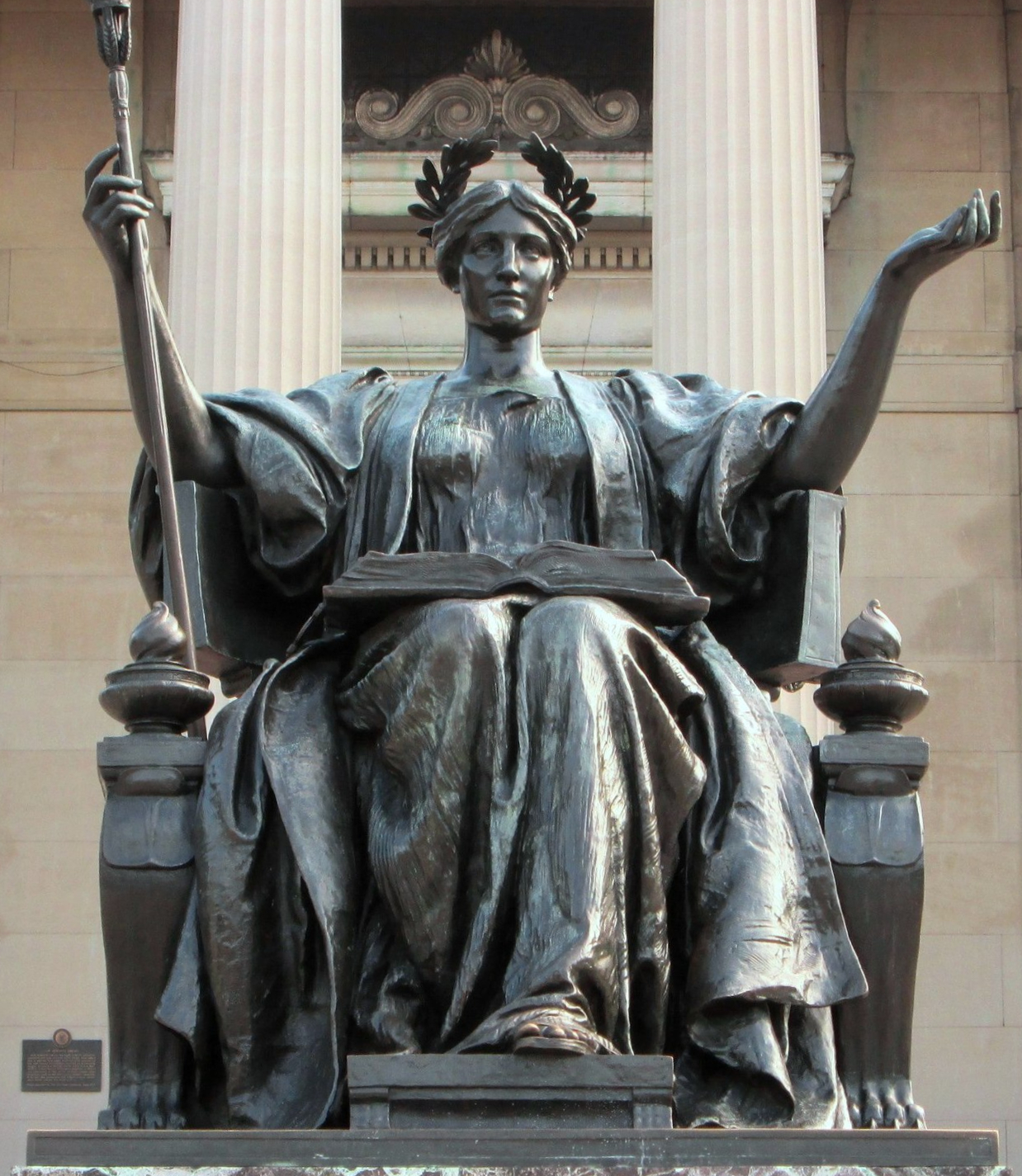
Alma Mater, by Daniel Chester French (1903)

In 1813, the college incorporated its medical school with The College of Physicians and Surgeons, a new school created by the Regents of New York, forming Columbia University College of Physicians and Surgeons. In 1857, the college moved from the King's College campus at Park Place to a primarily Gothic Revival campus on 49th Street and Madison Avenue, where it remained for the next forty years. During the last half of the 19th century, under the presidency of Frederick A. P. Barnard, for whom Barnard College is named, the institution rapidly assumed the shape of a modern university. Barnard College was created in 1889 as a response to the university's refusal to accept women. In 1896, university president Seth Low moved the campus from 49th Street to its present location, a more spacious campus in the developing neighborhood of Morningside Heights.

=== 20th century ===
In March 1917, as a result of America's entrance into World War 1, Columbia president Nicholas Murray Butler formed the Columbia Reserve Officers Training Corps. All students over the age of 18 who passed a physical exam were entered into this program. Within 4 months, over 1,400 students were enrolled within the program. They were one of 12 universities designated by the War department to create a naval section for the Student Army Training Corps. As part of this new program, the US Army charged Columbia to create a "War Issues" course. In 1919, a similar course was created for Columbia students, a "peace issues" course that evolved into "Introduction to Contemporary Civilization in the West", part of the university's core curriculum for undergraduate students.

In 1919, Columbia established a student application process characterized by The New York Times as "the first modern college application". In 1928, Seth Low Junior College was established by Columbia University in order to mitigate the number of Jewish applicants to Columbia College. The college was closed in 1936 due to the adverse effects of the Great Depression and its students were subsequently taught at the Morningside Heights campus, although they did not belong to any college but to the university at large.

In the 1940s, faculty members, including John R. Dunning, Isidor Isaac Rabi, Enrico Fermi, and Polykarp Kusch, began what became the Manhattan Project, creating the first nuclear fission reactor in the Americas and researching gaseous diffusion. In the aftermath of World War II, the discipline of international relations became a major scholarly focus of the university, and in response, the School of International and Public Affairs was founded in 1946, drawing upon the resources of the faculties of political science, economics, and history. In 1947, University Extension, an evening school program open to all for a fee, was reorganized as an undergraduate college and designated the School of General Studies in response to the return of GIs after World War II.

The Columbia University Bicentennial was celebrated in 1954. During the 1960s, student activism reached a climax with protests in the spring of 1968, when hundreds of students occupied buildings on campus. The incident forced the resignation of Columbia's president, Grayson Kirk, and the establishment of the University Senate. Though several schools in the university had admitted women for years, Columbia College first admitted women in the fall of 1983, after a decade of failed negotiations with Barnard College, the all-female institution affiliated with the university, to merge the two schools. Barnard College still remains affiliated with Columbia, and all Barnard graduates are issued diplomas signed by the presidents of Columbia University and Barnard College.

During the late 20th century, the university underwent significant academic, structural, and administrative changes as it developed into a major research university. For much of the 19th century, the university consisted of decentralized and separate faculties specializing in Political Science, Philosophy, and Pure Science. In 1979, these faculties were merged into the Graduate School of Arts and Sciences. In 1991, the faculties of Columbia College, the School of General Studies, the Graduate School of Arts and Sciences, the School of the Arts, and the School of Professional Studies were merged into the Faculty of Arts and Sciences, leading to the academic integration and centralized governance of these schools. In 1995, the Division of Special Programs, later called the School of Continuing Education and now the School of Professional Studies, was established to reprise the former role of University Extension.

=== 21st century ===
==== Bollinger presidency (2002–2023) ====
Lee C. Bollinger became Columbia's 19th president in June 2002, succeeding George Rupp. Bollinger was appointed in October 2001 after arriving from the presidency of the University of Michigan. His presidency emphasized campus expansion, defense of affirmative action in college admissions, support for government funding of private sector media, and opposition to disinformation.

Under Bollinger's tenure, the university publicly launched a record $4 billion capital campaign in September 2006. Financial aid was improved, eliminating loans for undergraduates from families earning under $50,000, and additional funds were allocated to support Bollinger's efforts toward the Manhattanville campus expansion, which nearly doubled Columbia's physical footprint. This expansion was supported by a major gift from trustee Gerry Lenfest.

Globalization efforts continued with the World Leaders Forum and the creation of the Committee on Global Thought, chaired by Joseph Stiglitz.

In 2006, Norries Wilson became the first African-American head football coach in the Ivy League, when he began his tenure with the Columbia University football team.

The 2008 financial crisis impacted Columbia's endowment. The endowment recovered, hitting $8.2B in Oct 2013. Despite the downturn, the university pressed on with Manhattanville construction, receiving final state approval in June 2009.

In May 2011, following the repeal of "Don't Ask, Don't Tell," the University Senate voted 51–17 to invite ROTC back after a 40-year absence, and Bollinger announced an agreement with the Navy.

From 2014 to 2021, Columbia University pursued significant physical expansion, notably opening major facilities on the Manhattanville campus (ZMBBI, Lenfest Center, The Forum). Key strategic initiatives launched included the Knight First Amendment Institute, Columbia World Projects, and the new Columbia Climate School (2020). A $5 billion university capital campaign was launched (with a $1.5B A&S target), major gifts like $50M for A&S's Uris Hall renovation were secured, and the endowment grew significantly ($14.35B by mid-2021).

In February 2022, Columbia's mathematics professor Michael Thaddeus published a website and argued that data submitted by Columbia for U.S. News college rankings was "inaccurate, dubious or highly misleading". In July 2022, U.S. News & World Report unranked Columbia citing failed verification. In September 2022, Columbia acknowledged the submission of incorrect data to U.S. News college rankings. In June 2023, Columbia announced its non-participation in the rankings. In July 2025, Columbia offered to pay US$9 million to settle a class-action lawsuit by its students in Manhattan federal court over the alleged submission of false data to boost its U.S. News college rankings.

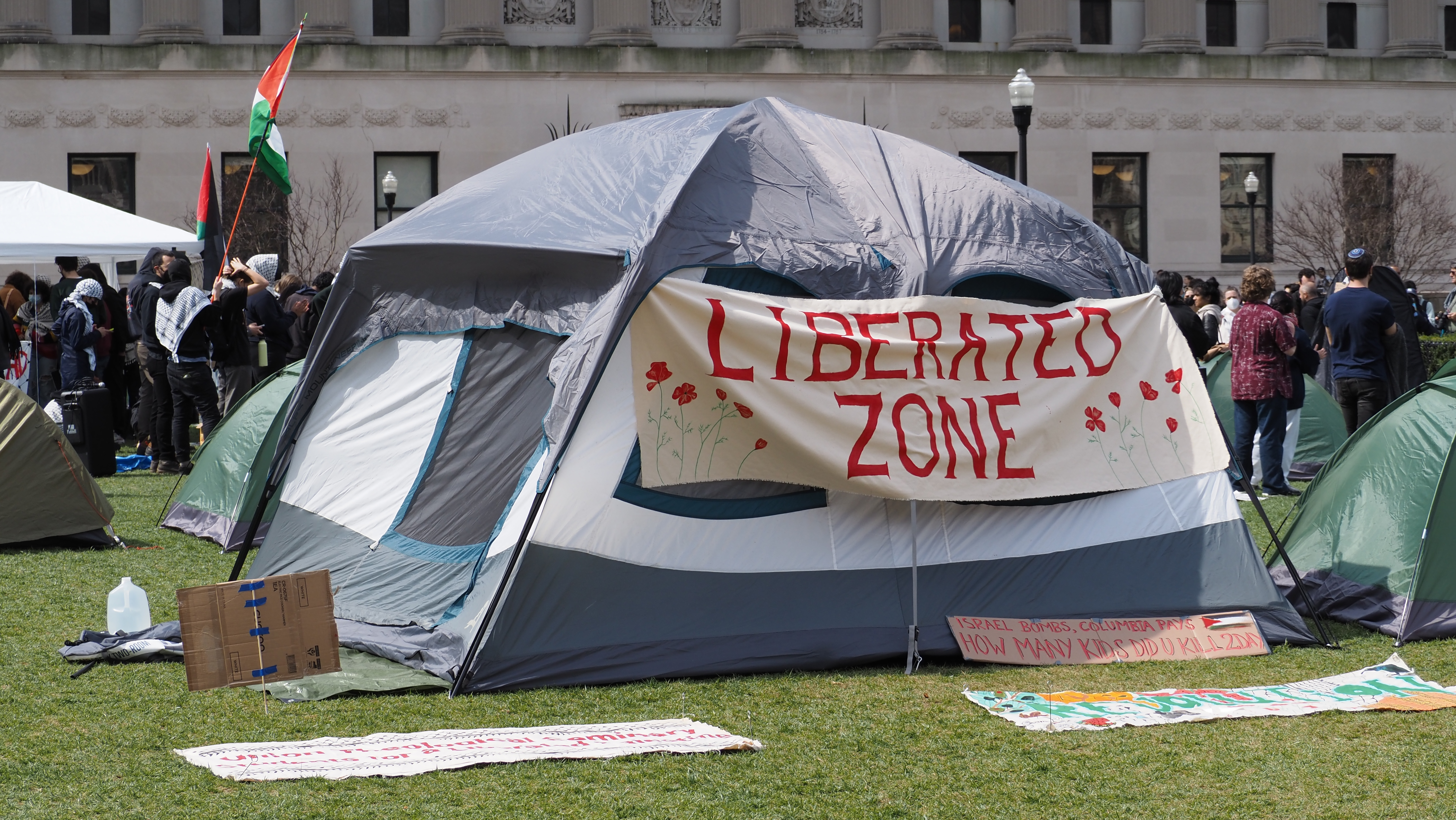
A tent in the Gaza Solidarity Encampment (April 17–30, 2024), part of a broader protest movement at the university during the Gaza war and genocide, April 17, 2024.

==== Acting presidents ====
Beginning in fall 2023, protests at Columbia University against the Gaza war and what student protesters described as Columbia's complicity in the Gaza genocide, resulted in police action, student disciplinary measures, and the appointment of Katrina Armstrong, MD as interim president in August 2024 after the resignation of former university president Minouche Shafik. The federal government also launched an investigation into antisemitism and then withdrew funding, prompting the university to adopt new policies and adjust disciplinary processes.

Claire Shipman was appointed acting president in March 2025. Columbia also closed its Morningside Heights campus to the general public, allowing access only to holders of Columbia ID cards and approved guests. In July 2025, Columbia finalized a $220 million settlement to resume federal funding, agreeing to implement a set of reforms to address anti-semitism. The university also adopted the IHRA definition of antisemitism.

In March 2026, a $481 million ruling that Columbia University had won against software company Gen Digital for infringing patents related to cybersecurity technology was overturned. The U.S. Court of Appeals for the Federal Circuit stated that Columbia's patents may be invalid and sent the case back to Virginia federal court.

Jennifer Mnookin, who previously served as chancellor of the University of Wisconsin-Madison, became the president of Columbia University on July 1, 2026, after the university announced in January 2026 that she had been chosen for the role.

== Campus ==
=== Morningside Heights ===
The majority of Columbia's graduate and undergraduate studies are conducted in the Upper Manhattan neighborhood of Morningside Heights on Seth Low's late-19th century vision of a university campus where all disciplines could be taught at one location. The campus was designed along Beaux-Arts planning principles by the architects McKim, Mead & White. Columbia's main campus occupies more than six city blocks, or 32 acres (13 ha), in Morningside Heights, New York City, a neighborhood that contains a number of academic institutions.

The university owns over 7,800 apartments in Morningside Heights, housing faculty, graduate students, and staff. Almost two dozen undergraduate dormitories (purpose-built or converted) are located on campus or in Morningside Heights. Columbia University has an extensive tunnel system, more than a century old, with the oldest portions predating the present campus. Some of these remain accessible to the public, while others have been cordoned off.

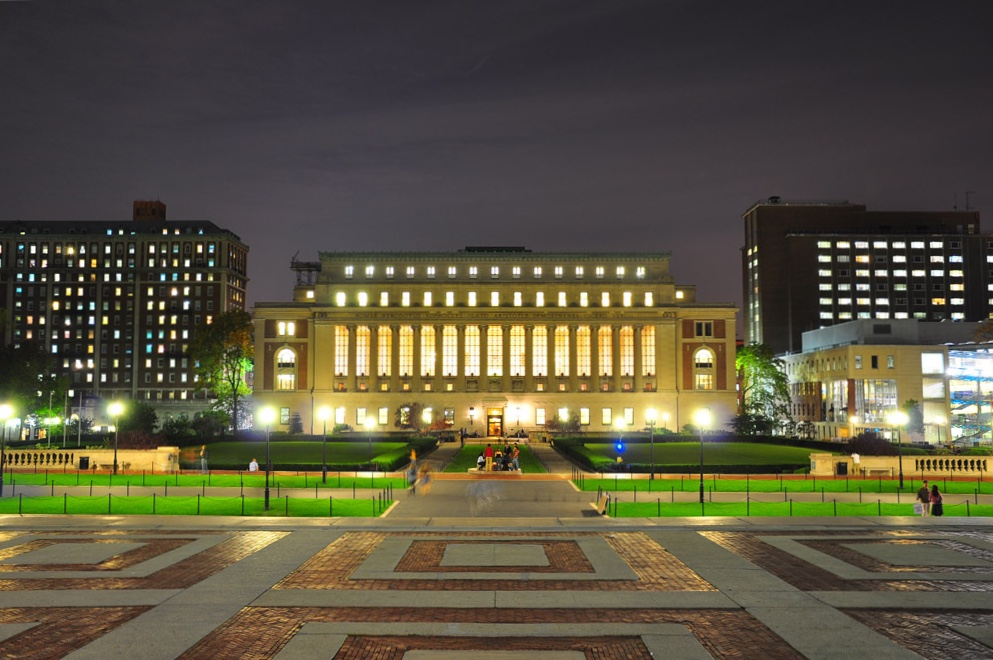
Butler Library

Butler Library is the largest in the Columbia University Libraries system and one of the largest buildings on the campus. It was completed in 1934 and renamed to Butler Library in 1946. As of 2020, Columbia's library system includes over 15.0 million volumes, making it the eighth largest library system and fifth largest collegiate library system in the United States.

Several buildings on the Morningside Heights campus are listed on the National Register of Historic Places. Low Memorial Library, a National Historic Landmark and the centerpiece of the campus, is listed for its architectural significance. Philosophy Hall is listed as the site of the invention of FM radio. Also listed is Pupin Hall, another National Historic Landmark, which houses the physics and astronomy departments. Here the first experiments on the fission of uranium were conducted by Enrico Fermi. The uranium atom was split there ten days after the world's first atom-splitting in Copenhagen, Denmark. Other buildings listed include Casa Italiana, the Delta Psi, Alpha Chapter building of St. Anthony Hall, Earl Hall, and the buildings of the affiliated Union Theological Seminary.

A statue by sculptor Daniel Chester French called Alma Mater is centered on the front steps of Low Memorial Library. The statue represents a personification of the traditional image of the university as an alma mater, or "nourishing mother", draped in an academic gown and seated on a throne. She wears a laurel wreath on her head and holds in her right hand a scepter capped by a King's Crown, a traditional symbol of the university. A book, representing learning, rests on her lap. The arms of her throne end in lamps, representing "Sapientia et Doctrina", or "Wisdom and Learning"; on the back of the throne is embossed an image of the seal of the university.

The small hidden owl on the sculpture is also the subject of many Columbia legends, the main legend being that the first student in the freshmen class to find the hidden owl on the statue will be valedictorian, and that any subsequent Columbia male who finds it will marry a Barnard student, given that Barnard is a women's college.

"The Steps", alternatively known as "Low Steps" or the "Urban Beach", are a popular meeting area for Columbia students. The term refers to the long series of granite steps leading from the lower part of campus (South Field) to its upper terrace.

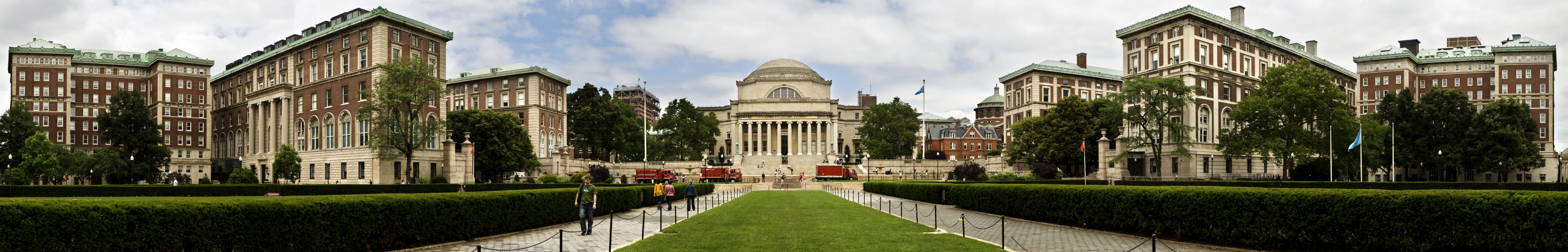
A panoramic view of the Morningside Heights campus as seen from Butler Library and facing Low Memorial Library

=== Other campuses ===
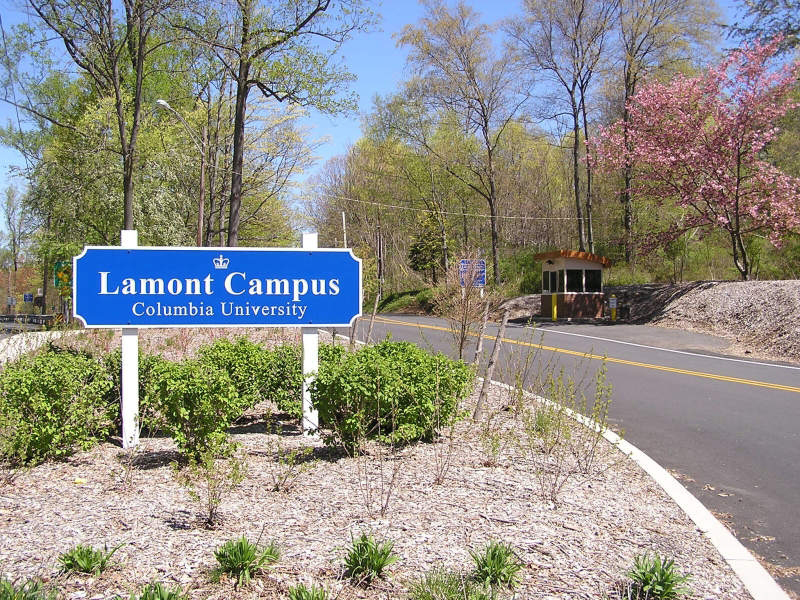
Lamont Campus entrance in Palisades, New York

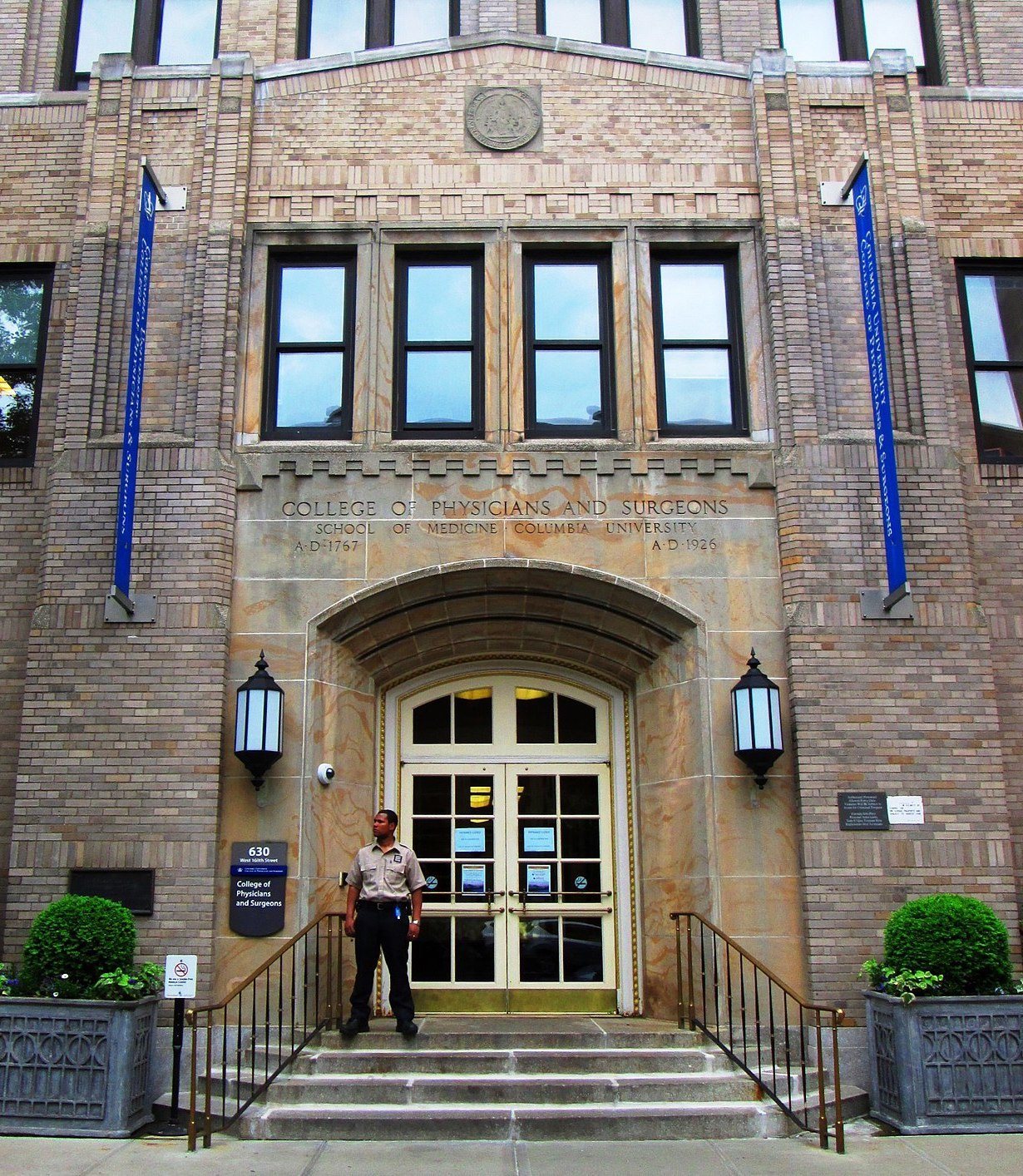
The entrance to the College of Physicians and Surgeons in Washington Heights

In April 2007, the university purchased more than two-thirds of a 17 acres (6.9 ha) site for a new campus in Manhattanville, an industrial neighborhood to the north of the Morningside Heights campus. Stretching from 125th Street to 133rd Street, Columbia Manhattanville houses buildings for Columbia's Business School, School of International and Public Affairs, Columbia School of the Arts, and the Jerome L. Greene Center for Mind, Brain, and Behavior, where research will occur on neurodegenerative diseases such as Parkinson's and Alzheimer's.

The $7 billion expansion plan included demolishing all buildings, except three that are historically significant (the Studebaker Building, Prentis Hall, and the Nash Building), eliminating the existing light industry and storage warehouses, and relocating tenants in 132 apartments. Replacing these buildings created 6.8 million square feet (630,000 m^{2}) of space for the university. Community activist groups in West Harlem fought the expansion for reasons ranging from property protection and fair exchange for land, to residents' rights.

Subsequent public hearings drew neighborhood opposition. As of December 2008, the State of New York's Empire State Development Corporation approved use of eminent domain, which, through declaration of Manhattanville's "blighted" status, gives governmental bodies the right to appropriate private property for public use. On May 20, 2009, the New York State Public Authorities Control Board approved the Manhanttanville expansion plan.

NewYork-Presbyterian Hospital is affiliated with the medical schools of both Columbia University and Cornell University. According to U.S. News & World Report's "2020–21 Best Hospitals Honor Roll and Medical Specialties Rankings", it is ranked fourth overall and second among university hospitals. Columbia's medical school has a strategic partnership with New York State Psychiatric Institute, and is affiliated with 19 other hospitals in the U.S. and four hospitals in other countries. Health-related schools are located at the Columbia University Medical Center, a 20-acre (8.1 ha) campus located in the neighborhood of Washington Heights, fifty blocks uptown. Other teaching hospitals affiliated with Columbia through the NewYork-Presbyterian network include the Payne Whitney Clinic in Manhattan, and the Payne Whitney Westchester, a psychiatric institute located in White Plains, New York.

On the northern tip of Manhattan island (in the neighborhood of Inwood), Columbia owns the 26-acre (11 ha) Baker Field, which includes the Lawrence A. Wien Stadium as well as facilities for field sports, outdoor track, and tennis. There is a third campus on the west bank of the Hudson River, the 157-acre (64 ha) Lamont–Doherty Earth Observatory and Earth Institute in Palisades, New York. A fourth is the 60-acre (24 ha) Nevis Laboratories in Irvington, New York, for the study of particle and motion physics. A satellite site in Paris holds classes at Reid Hall.

=== Sustainability ===
In 2006, the university established the Office of Environmental Stewardship to initiate, coordinate and implement programs to reduce the university's environmental footprint. The U.S. Green Building Council selected the university's Manhattanville plan for the Leadership in Energy and Environmental Design (LEED) Neighborhood Design pilot program. Columbia has been rated "B+" by the 2011 College Sustainability Report Card for its environmental and sustainability initiatives.

=== Transportation ===
The main campus is primarily boxed off by the streets of Amsterdam Avenue, Broadway, 114th street, and 120th street, with some buildings, including Barnard College, located just outside the area. The nearest major highway is the Henry Hudson Parkway (NY 9A) to the west of the campus. It is located 3.4 miles (5.5 km) south of the George Washington Bridge.

Columbia Transportation is the bus service of the university, operated by Academy Bus Lines. The buses are open to all Columbia faculty, students, Dodge Fitness Center members, and anyone else who holds a Columbia ID card. In addition, all TSC students can ride the buses. In the New York City Subway, the train serves the university at 116th Street-Columbia University. The M4, M104 and M60 buses stop on Broadway while the M11 stops on Amsterdam Avenue.

== Academics ==
Columbia University Schools	Founded
Columbia College	1754
College of Physicians and Surgeons	1767
Columbia Law School	1858
Fu Foundation School of Engineering and Applied Science	1864
Graduate School of Arts and Sciences	1880
Graduate School of Architecture, Planning and Preservation	1881
Teachers College, Columbia University (affiliate)	1887
Barnard College (affiliate)	1889
School of Nursing	1892
School of Social Work	1898
Graduate School of Journalism	1912
Columbia Business School	1916
College of Dental Medicine	1916
Mailman School of Public Health	1922
Union Theological Seminary (affiliate)	1928
School of International and Public Affairs	1946
School of General Studies	1947
Jewish Theological Seminary of America (affiliate)	1954
School of the Arts	1965
School of Professional Studies	1995
Columbia Climate School	2020

=== Organization ===
Columbia University is an independent, privately supported, nonsectarian and not-for-profit institution of higher education. Its official corporate name is Trustees of Columbia University in the City of New York.

Joint degree programs are available through Union Theological Seminary, the Jewish Theological Seminary of America, and the Juilliard School. Teachers College and Barnard College are official faculties of the university; both colleges' presidents are deans under the university governance structure. The Columbia University Senate includes faculty and student representatives from Teachers College and Barnard College who serve two-year terms; all senators are accorded full voting privileges regarding matters impacting the entire university. Teachers College is an affiliated, financially independent graduate school with their own board of trustees. Pursuant to an affiliation agreement, Columbia is given the authority to confer "degrees and diplomas" to the graduates of Teachers College. The degrees are signed by presidents of Teachers College and Columbia University in a manner analogous to the university's other graduate schools.

=== Undergraduate admissions and financial aid ===
Undergraduate admissions statistics
- 2021 entering class
- Admit rate: 3.9% (▼ −2.1)
- Yield rate: 66.5% (▲ +1.4)

Test scores middle 50%
- SAT Total: 1510–1560 (▼ −10 median)

Columbia is a racially diverse school, with approximately 52% of all students identifying themselves as persons of color. Additionally, around 50% of all undergraduates received grants from Columbia. The college is need-blind for domestic applicants. In April 2007, Columbia University announced a $400 million donation from media billionaire alumnus John Kluge to be used exclusively for undergraduate financial aid. The donation is among the largest single gifts to higher education. However, this did not apply to international students, transfer students, visiting students, or students in the School of General Studies. In the fall of 2010, admission to Columbia's undergraduate colleges Columbia College and the Fu Foundation School of Engineering and Applied Science (also known as SEAS or Columbia Engineering) began accepting the Common Application. The policy change made Columbia one of the last major academic institutions and the last Ivy League university to switch to the Common Application.

=== International partnerships ===
Columbia students can study abroad for a semester or a year at partner institutions such as Sciences Po, École des hautes études en sciences sociales (EHESS), École normale supérieure (ENS), Panthéon-Sorbonne University, King's College London, London School of Economics, University College London and the University of Warwick. Select students can study at either the University of Oxford or the University of Cambridge for a year if approved by both Columbia and either Oxford or Cambridge. Columbia also has a dual MA program with the Aga Khan University in London.

=== Rankings ===
Academic rankings

National
- Forbes: 2
- U.S. News & World Report: 12 (tie)
- WSJ/College Pulse: 8

Global
- ARWU: 8 (tie)
- QS: 43 (tie)
- THE: 18 (tie)
- U.S. News & World Report: 10

Columbia University was ranked 12th in the United States and tenth globally for 2023–2024 by U.S. News & World Report.

In 2021, Columbia was ranked seventh in the world (sixth in the United States) by Academic Ranking of World Universities, sixth in the world by U.S. News & World Report, 19th in the world by QS World University Rankings, and 11th globally by Times Higher Education World University Rankings. It was ranked in the first tier of American research universities, along with Harvard, MIT, and Stanford, in the 2019 report from the Center for Measuring University Performance.

In 2025, Columbia was ranked 250 out of 257 top colleges in "Free Speech Rankings" by the Foundation for Individual Rights and Expression and "College Pulse", after ranking 214 of 248 in 2024 and at the bottom of 203 in 2022/2023. In 2024 and 2025, Columbia received a D on the "Campus Antisemitism Report Card" of the Anti-Defamation League, which the advocacy organization first launched in spring 2024, in the lead-up to and in the context of campus conflict over the 2024 Columbia University pro-Palestinian campus occupations.

=== Research ===
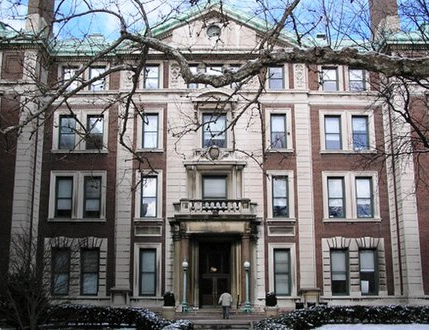
Havemeyer Hall, a National Historic Chemical Landmark, where deuterium was discovered in 1931. Research conducted in Havemeyer has been recognized with seven Nobel Prizes in Chemistry.

Columbia is classified among "R1: Doctoral Universities – Very high research activity". Columbia scientists have been credited with about 175 new inventions in the health sciences each year. Columbia is affiliated with many research facilities, such as the Columbia Institute for Tele-Information dedicated to telecommunications and the Goddard Institute for Space Studies, which is an astronomical observatory affiliated with NASA. Columbia has been the site of many scientific milestones, including the first nuclear fission in North America, the invention of FM radio and the laser, and key contributions to neuroscience. Researchers at Columbia have also advanced efforts in technology, such as digital media, cellular imaging, and brain-computer interfaces.

=== Military and veteran enrollment ===
Columbia is a long-standing participant of the United States Department of Veterans Affairs Yellow Ribbon Program, allowing eligible veterans and their dependents to pursue a Columbia undergraduate degree regardless of socioeconomic status for over 70 years. As a part of the Eisenhower Leader Development Program (ELDP) in partnership with the United States Military Academy at West Point, Columbia is the only school in the Ivy League to offer a graduate degree program in organizational psychology to aid military officers in tactical decision making and strategic management.

=== Awards ===
Several prestigious awards are administered by Columbia University, most notably the Pulitzer Prize and the Bancroft Prize in history. Other prizes, which are awarded by the Graduate School of Journalism, include the Alfred I. duPont–Columbia University Award, the National Magazine Awards, the Maria Moors Cabot Prizes, the John Chancellor Award, and the Lukas Prizes, which include the J. Anthony Lukas Book Prize and Mark Lynton History Prize. The university also administers the Louisa Gross Horwitz Prize, which is considered an important precursor to the Nobel Prize, 55 of its 117 recipients having gone on to win either a Nobel Prize in Physiology or Medicine or Nobel Prize in Chemistry as of October 2024; the W. Alden Spencer Award; the Vetlesen Prize, which is known as the Nobel Prize of geology; the Japan-U.S. Friendship Commission Prize for the Translation of Japanese Literature, the oldest such award; the Edwin Howard Armstrong award; the Calderone Prize in public health; and the Ditson Conductor's Award.

== Student life ==
Student body composition as of May 2, 2022
Race and ethnicity	Total
White	33%
Foreign national	18%
Asian	17%
Hispanic	15%
Other (Note: Other consists of Multiracial Americans and those who prefer not to say.)	10%
Black	7%
Economic diversity
Low-income (Note: The percentage of students who received an income-based federal Pell grant intended for low-income students.)	19%
Affluent (Note: The percentage of students who are a part of the American middle class at the bare minimum.)	81%

Columbia University has a large, diverse population, with a significant numbers of students identifying as members of underrepresented racial, ethnic and socioeconomic groups, including, in many cases, first-generation college students.

Columbia University is home to many fraternities, sororities, and co-educational Greek organizations. Approximately 10–15% of undergraduate students are associated with Greek life. Many Barnard women also join Columbia sororities. There has been a Greek presence on campus since the establishment in 1836 of the Delta chapter of Alpha Delta Phi.

=== Publications ===
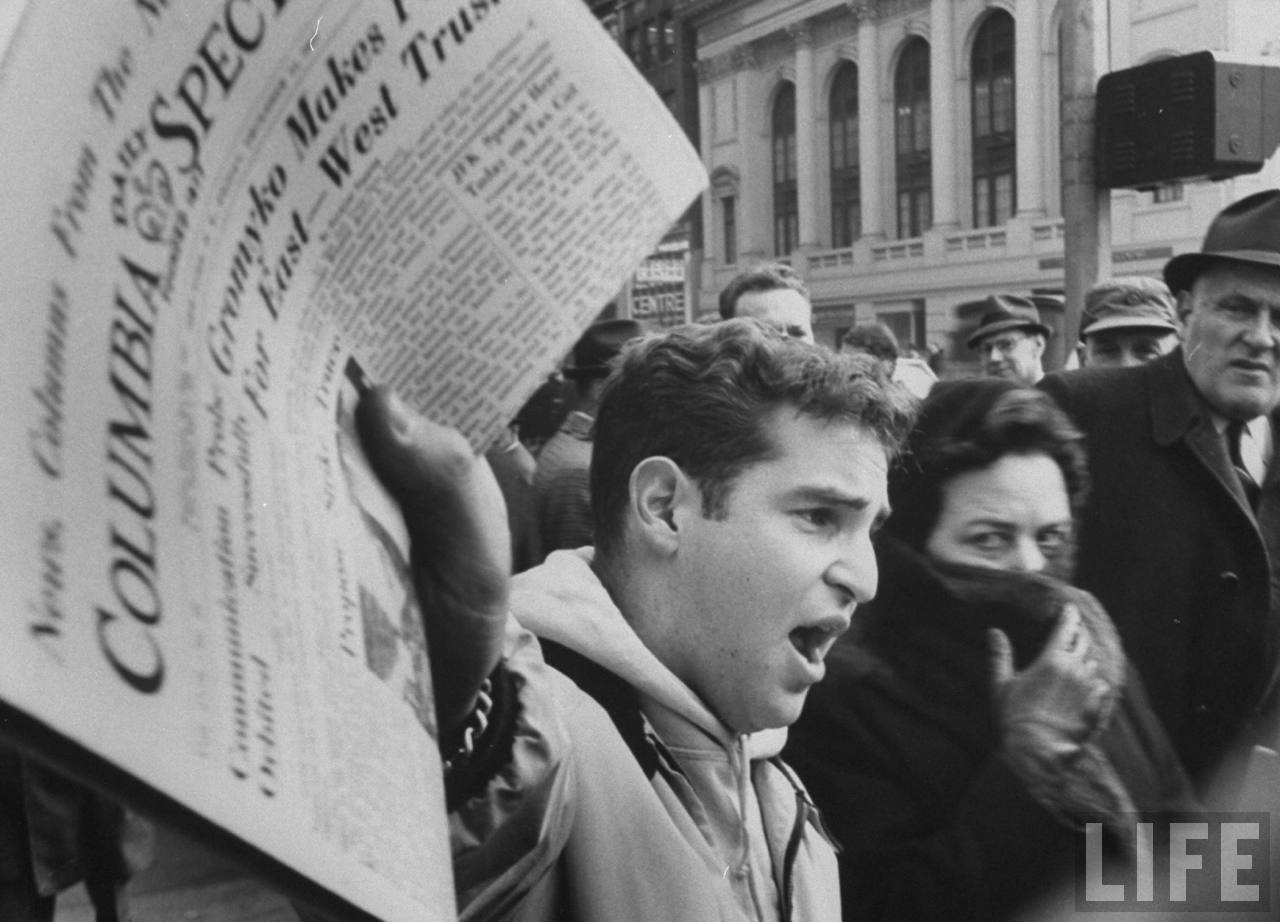
Copies of the Columbia Daily Spectator being sold during the 1962–1963 New York City newspaper strike

The Columbia Daily Spectator is the nation's second-oldest continuously operating daily student newspaper. The Blue and White is a monthly literary magazine established in 1890 that discusses campus life and local politics. Bwog, originally an offshoot of The Blue and White but now fully independent, is an online campus news and entertainment source. The Morningside Post is a student-run multimedia news publication.

Political publications include The Current, a journal of politics, culture and Jewish Affairs; the Columbia Political Review, the multi-partisan political magazine of the Columbia Political Union; and AdHoc, which denotes itself as the "progressive" campus magazine and deals largely with local political issues and arts events.

Columbia Magazine is the alumni magazine of Columbia, serving all 340,000+ of the university's alumni. Arts and literary publications include The Columbia Review, the nation's oldest college literary magazine; Surgam, the literary magazine of the Philolexian Society; Quarto, Columbia University's official undergraduate literary magazine; 4x4, a student-run alternative to Quarto; Columbia, a nationally regarded literary journal; the Columbia Journal of Literary Criticism; and The Mobius Strip, an online arts and literary magazine. Inside New York is an annual guidebook to New York City, written, edited, and published by Columbia undergraduates. Through a distribution agreement with Columbia University Press, the book is sold at major retailers and independent bookstores.

Columbia is home to numerous undergraduate academic publications. The Columbia Undergraduate Science Journal prints original science research in its two annual publications. The Journal of Politics & Society is a journal of undergraduate research in the social sciences; Publius is an undergraduate journal of politics established in 2008 and published biannually; the Columbia East Asia Review allows undergraduates throughout the world to publish original work on China, Japan, Korea, Tibet, and Vietnam and is supported by the Weatherhead East Asian Institute; The Birch is an undergraduate journal of Eastern European and Eurasian culture that is the first national student-run journal of its kind; the Columbia Economics Review is the undergraduate economic journal on research and policy supported by the economics department; and the Columbia Science Review is a science magazine that prints general interest articles and faculty profiles.

Humor publications campus include The Fed, a triweekly satire and investigative newspaper, and the Jester of Columbia. Other publications include The Columbian, the undergraduate colleges' annually published yearbook; the Gadfly, a biannual journal of popular philosophy produced by undergraduates; and Rhapsody in Blue, an undergraduate urban studies magazine.

Professional journals published by academic departments include Current Musicology and The Journal of Philosophy. The Graduate School of Journalism publishes The Bronx Beat each spring, a bi-weekly newspaper covering the South Bronx. In 1961, the journalism school founded the Columbia Journalism Review, a professional magazine which is published six times a year. Defunct publications include the Columbia University Forum, a review of literature and cultural affairs for alumni.

=== Broadcasting ===
Columbia is home to two pioneers in undergraduate campus radio broadcasting, WKCR-FM and CTV. A student-run radio station, WKCR broadcasts to the Tri-state area and claims to be the oldest FM radio station in the world, owing to the university's affiliation with Edwin Howard Armstrong. The station has its studios on the second floor of Alfred Lerner Hall on the Morningside campus with its main transmitter tower at 4 Times Square in Midtown Manhattan. Columbia Television (CTV) is the nation's second oldest student television station and the home of CTV News, a weekly live news program produced by undergraduate students.

=== Debate and Model UN ===
The Philolexian Society is a literary and debating club founded in 1802, making it the oldest student group at Columbia, as well as the third oldest collegiate literary society in the country. The society annually administers the Joyce Kilmer Memorial Bad Poetry Contest. The Columbia Parliamentary Debate Team competes in tournaments around the country as part of the American Parliamentary Debate Association, and hosts both high school and college tournaments on Columbia's campus, as well as public debates on issues affecting the university. The Columbia International Relations Council and Association (CIRCA), oversees Columbia's Model United Nations activities. CIRCA hosts college and high school Model UN conferences, hosts speakers influential in international politics to speak on campus, and trains students from underprivileged schools in New York in Model UN.

=== Technology and entrepreneurship ===
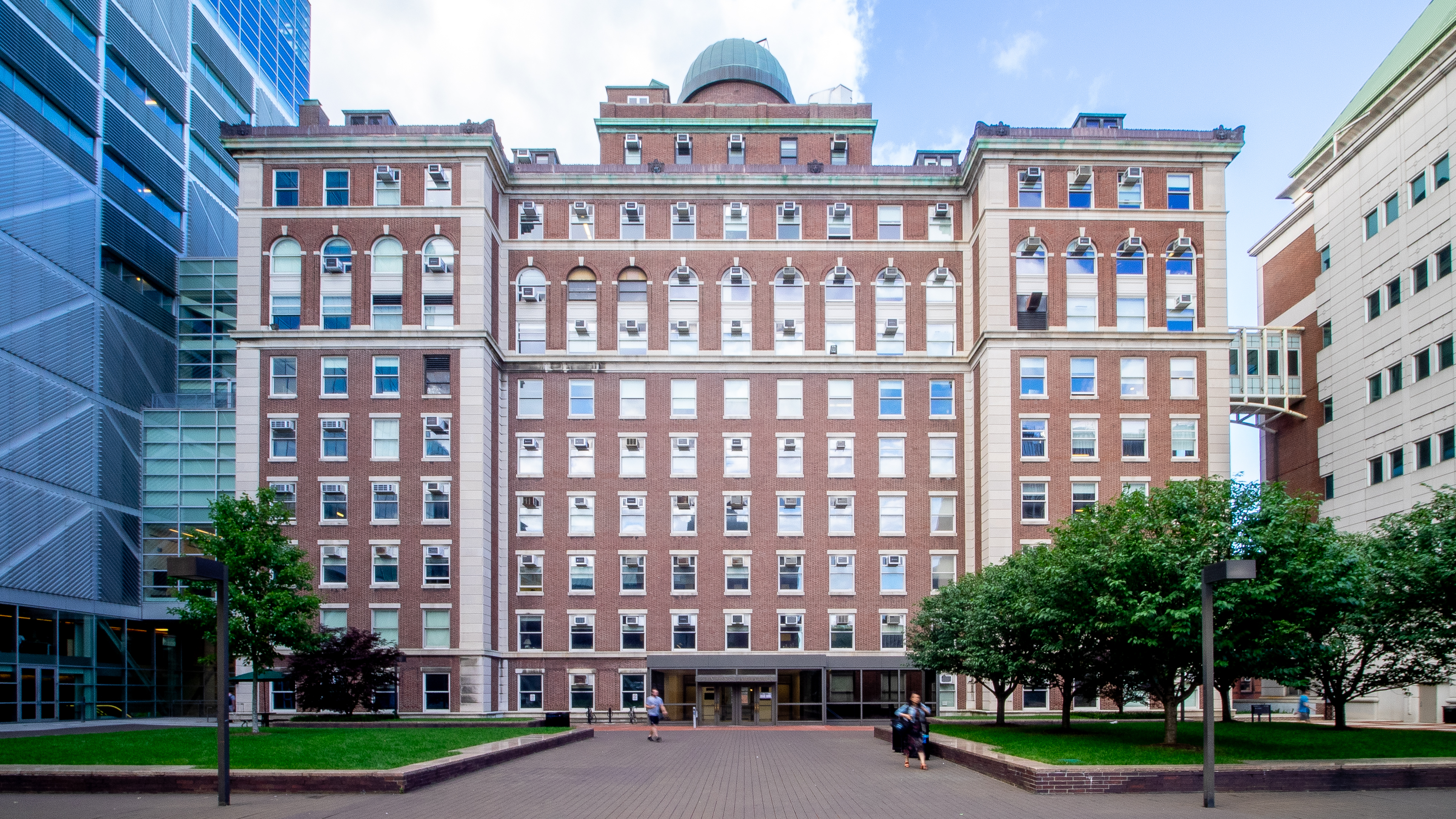
Pupin Hall, the physics building, showing the rooftop Rutherfurd Observatory

Many engineering entrepreneurs in New York City have attended Columbia. Since 1990, graduates of Columbia have established more than 100 technology companies.

The student-run group Columbia University Organization of Rising Entrepreneurs (CORE) was founded in 1999 with an aim to foster entrepreneurship on campus. Each year CORE hosts events, including #StartupColumbia, a conference and venture competition for $250,000, and Ignite@CU, a weekend for undergraduate students interested in design, engineering, and entrepreneurship. Notable speakers include Peter Thiel, Jack Dorsey, Alexis Ohanian, Drew Houston, and Mark Cuban.

CampusNetwork, an on-campus social networking site called Campus Network that preceded Facebook, was created and popularized by Columbia engineering student Adam Goldberg in 2003. Mark Zuckerberg later asked Goldberg to join him in Palo Alto to work on Facebook, but Goldberg declined the offer. The Fu Foundation School of Engineering and Applied Science offers a minor in Technical Entrepreneurship through its Center for Technology, Innovation, and Community Engagement. SEAS' entrepreneurship activities focus on community building initiatives in New York and worldwide, made possible through partners such as Microsoft Corporation.

On June 14, 2010, Mayor Michael R. Bloomberg launched the NYC Media Lab to promote innovations in New York's media industry. Situated at the New York University Tandon School of Engineering, the lab is a consortium of Columbia University, New York University, and New York City Economic Development Corporation acting to connect companies with universities in new technology research. The Lab is modeled after similar ones at MIT and Stanford, and was established with a $250,000 grant from the New York City Economic Development Corporation.

=== World Leaders Forum ===
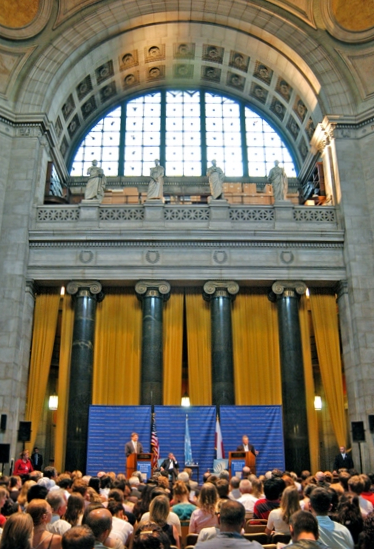
The World Leaders Forum at Low Memorial Library

Established in 2003 by university president Lee C. Bollinger, the World Leaders Forum at Columbia University provides the opportunity for students and faculty to listen to world leaders in government, religion, industry, finance, and academia.

Past forum speakers include former president of the United States Bill Clinton, former prime minister of India Atal Bihari Vajpayee, former president of Ghana John Agyekum Kufuor, president of Afghanistan Hamid Karzai, prime minister of Russia Vladimir Putin, president of the Republic of Mozambique Joaquim Alberto Chissano, president of the Republic of Bolivia Carlos Diego Mesa Gisbert, president of the Republic of Romania Ion Iliescu, president of the Republic of Latvia Vaira Vīķe-Freiberga, and the first female president of Finland Tarja Halonen.

Other speakers include President Yudhoyono of Indonesia, President Pervez Musharraf of the Islamic Republic of Pakistan, Iraq President Jalal Talabani, the 14th Dalai Lama, president of the Islamic Republic of Iran Mahmoud Ahmadinejad, financier George Soros, Mayor of New York City Michael R. Bloomberg, President Václav Klaus of the Czech Republic, President Cristina Fernández de Kirchner of Argentina, former Secretary-General of the United Nations Kofi Annan, and Al Gore.

=== Other ===
The Columbia University Orchestra was founded by composer Edward MacDowell in 1896, and is the oldest continually operating university orchestra in the United States. Undergraduate student composers at Columbia may choose to become involved with Columbia New Music, which sponsors concerts of music written by undergraduate students from all of Columbia's schools. The Notes and Keys, the oldest a cappella group at Columbia, was founded in 1909.

There are a number of performing arts groups at Columbia dedicated to producing student theater, including the Columbia Players, King's Crown Shakespeare Troupe (KCST), Columbia Musical Theater Society (CMTS), NOMADS (New and Original Material Authored and Directed by Students), LateNite Theatre, Columbia University Performing Arts League (CUPAL), Black Theatre Ensemble (BTE), sketch comedy group Chowdah, and improvisational troupes Alfred and Fruit Paunch.

The Columbia Queer Alliance is the central Columbia student organization that represents the bisexual, lesbian, gay, transgender, and questioning student population. It is the oldest gay student organization in the world, founded as the Student Homophile League in 1967 by students including lifelong activist Stephen Donaldson.

Columbia University campus military groups include the U.S. Military Veterans of Columbia University and Advocates for Columbia ROTC. In the 2005–06 academic year, the Columbia Military Society, Columbia's student group for ROTC cadets and Marine officer candidates, was renamed the Hamilton Society for "students who aspire to serve their nation through the military in the tradition of Alexander Hamilton".

Columbia has several secret societies, including St. Anthony Hall, which was founded at the university in 1847, and two senior societies, the Nacoms and Sachems.

== Athletics ==
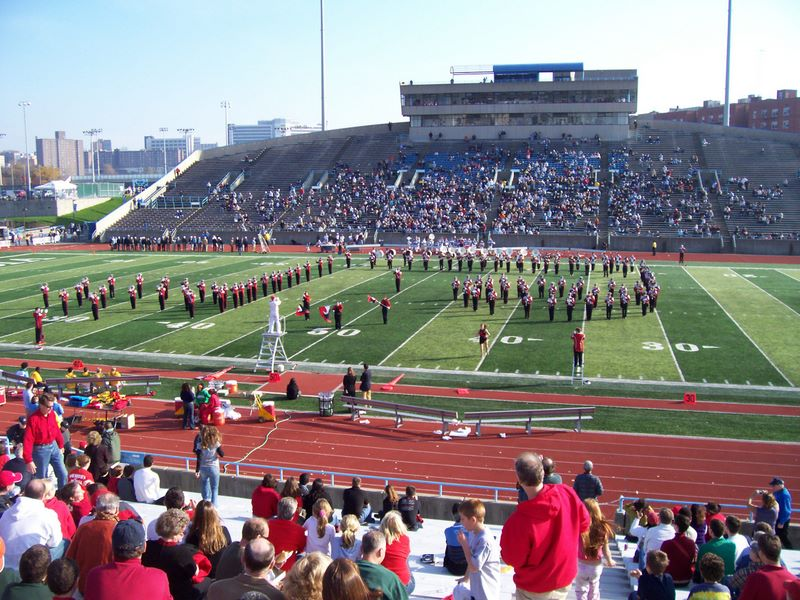
Robert K. Kraft Field at Lawrence A. Wien Stadium in Manhattan, home field of Columbia Lions football

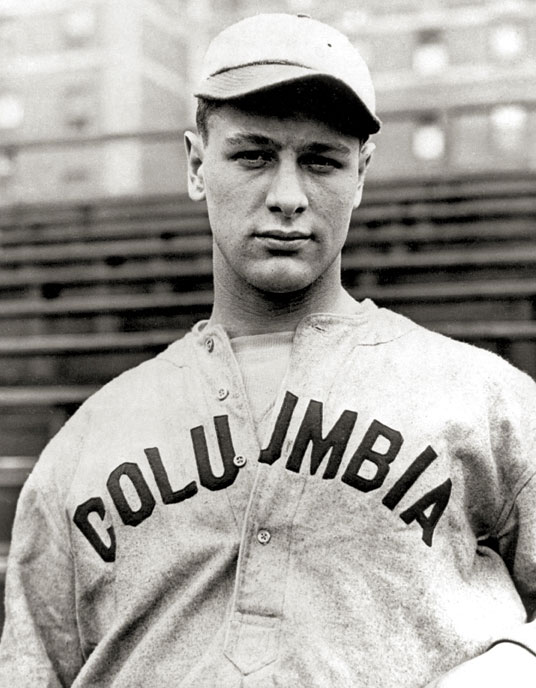
Lou Gehrig, who attended Columbia University in 1922 and 1923

A member institution of the National Collegiate Athletic Association (NCAA) in Division I FCS, Columbia fields varsity teams in 29 sports and is a member of the Ivy League. The football Lions play home games at the 17,000-seat Robert K. Kraft Field at Lawrence A. Wien Stadium. The Baker Athletics Complex also includes facilities for baseball, softball, soccer, lacrosse, field hockey, tennis, track, and rowing, as well as the new Campbell Sports Center, which opened in January 2013. The basketball, fencing, swimming & diving, volleyball, and wrestling programs are based at the Dodge Physical Fitness Center on the main campus.

Former students include Baseball Hall of Famers Lou Gehrig and Eddie Collins, football Hall of Famer Sid Luckman, Marcellus Wiley, and world champion women's weightlifter Karyn Marshall. On May 17, 1939, fledgling NBC broadcast a doubleheader between the Columbia Lions and the Princeton Tigers at Columbia's Baker Field, making it the first televised regular athletic event in history.

Between 1983 and 1988, the Columbia University football team lost 44 games in a row. The streak was broken on October 8, 1988, with a 16–13 victory over Princeton University. A new tradition has developed with the Liberty Cup. The Liberty Cup is awarded annually to the winner of the football game between Fordham and Columbia Universities, two of the only three NCAA Division I football teams in New York City.

== Traditions ==
=== The Varsity Show ===
Founded in 1893 as a fundraiser for the university's fledgling athletic teams, the Varsity Show draws together the entire Columbia undergraduate community for a series of performances every April. Dedicated to producing a unique full-length musical that skewers and satirizes many dubious aspects of life at Columbia, the Varsity Show is written and performed exclusively by university undergraduates. Various renowned playwrights, composers, authors, directors, and actors have contributed to the Varsity Show, either as writers or performers, while students at Columbia, including Richard Rodgers, Oscar Hammerstein II, Lorenz Hart, Herman J. Mankiewicz, I. A. L. Diamond, Herman Wouk, Greta Gerwig, and Kate McKinnon.

Notable past shows include Fly With Me (1920), The Streets of New York (1948), The Sky's the Limit (1954), and Angels at Columbia (1994). In particular, Streets of New York, after having been revived three times, opened off-Broadway in 1963 and was awarded a 1964 Drama Desk Award. The Mischief Maker (1903), written by Edgar Allan Woolf and Cassius Freeborn, premiered at Madison Square Garden in 1906 as Mam'zelle Champagne.

=== Tree Lighting and Yule Log ceremonies ===
The campus Tree Lighting ceremony was inaugurated in 1998. It celebrates the illumination of the medium-sized trees lining College Walk in front of Kent Hall and Hamilton Hall on the east end and Dodge Hall and Pulitzer Hall on the west, just before finals week in early December. The lights remain on until February 28. Students meet at the sundial for free hot chocolate, performances by a cappella groups, and speeches by the university president and a guest.

Immediately following the College Walk festivities is one of Columbia's older holiday traditions, the lighting of the Yule Log. The Christmas ceremony dates to a period prior to the American Revolutionary War, but lapsed before being revived by President Nicholas Murray Butler in 1910. A troop of students dressed as Continental Army soldiers carry the eponymous log from the sundial to the lounge of John Jay Hall, where it is lit amid the singing of seasonal carols. The Christmas ceremony is accompanied by a reading of A Visit From St. Nicholas by Clement Clarke Moore and Yes, Virginia, There is a Santa Claus by Francis Pharcellus Church.

== Notable people ==
=== Alumni ===
The university has graduated many notable alumni, including five Founding Fathers of the United States, an author of the United States Constitution and prominent Hollywood figures. Three United States presidents have attended Columbia, as well as 10 justices of the Supreme Court of the United States, including three chief justices. As of 2011, 125 Pulitzer Prize winners, five United States Poet Laureates, and 39 Oscar winners had attended Columbia.

Columbia faculty members have received multiple Nobel Prizes. Recipients include Joseph Stiglitz (Economics, 2001), Richard Axel and Linda Buck (Medicine, 2004), Edmund Phelps (Economics, 2006), and Orhan Pamuk (Literature, 2006).

In a 2016 ranking of universities worldwide with respect to living graduates who are billionaires, Columbia ranked second, after Harvard.

=== Faculty ===
As of 2021, Columbia employs 4,381 faculty, including 70 members of the National Academy of Sciences,, 178 members of the American Academy of Arts and Sciences, and 65 members of the National Academy of Medicine. In total, the Columbia faculty has included 52 Nobel laureates, 12 National Medal of Science recipients, and 32 National Academy of Engineering members. Notable university presidents include 34th President of the United States Dwight D. Eisenhower, 4th Vice President of the United States George Clinton, Founding Father and U.S. Senator from Connecticut William Samuel Johnson, Nobel Peace Prize laureate Nicholas Murray Butler, and First Amendment scholar Lee Bollinger.

Other notable Columbia University faculty include Zbigniew Brzezinski, Sonia Sotomayor, Kimberlé Crenshaw, Lee Bollinger, Franz Boas, Margaret Mead, Edward Sapir, John Dewey, Charles A. Beard, Max Horkheimer, Herbert Marcuse, Edward Said, Gayatri Chakravorty Spivak, Orhan Pamuk, Edwin Howard Armstrong, Enrico Fermi, Chien-Shiung Wu, Tsung-Dao Lee, Jack Steinberger, Joachim Frank, Joseph Stiglitz, Jeffrey Sachs, Robert Mundell, Thomas Hunt Morgan, Eric Kandel, Richard Axel, Andrei Okounkov, Minky Worden, and William York Tindall.

Columbia University faculty played particularly important roles during World War II and the creation of the New Deal under President Franklin D. Roosevelt, who attended Columbia Law School. The three core members of Roosevelt's Brain Trust: Adolf A. Berle, Raymond Moley, and Rexford Tugwell, were law professors at Columbia. Former United States Secretary of Labor, Francis Perkins was the principle architect of the New Deal and also earned her Master's from Columbia University. The Statistical Research Group, which used statistics to analyze military problems during World War II, was composed of Columbia researchers and faculty including George Stigler and Milton Friedman. Columbia faculty and researchers, including Enrico Fermi, Leo Szilard, Eugene T. Booth, John R. Dunning, George B. Pegram, Walter Zinn, Chien-Shiung Wu, Francis G. Slack, Harold Urey, Herbert L. Anderson, and Isidor Isaac Rabi, also played a significant role during the early phases of the Manhattan Project.

Following the rise of Nazi Germany, the exiled Institute for Social Research at Goethe University Frankfurt would affiliate itself with Columbia from 1934 to 1950. It was during this period that thinkers including Theodor W. Adorno, Max Horkheimer, and Herbert Marcuse wrote and published some of the most seminal works of the Frankfurt School, including Reason and Revolution, Dialectic of Enlightenment, and Eclipse of Reason. Professors Edward Said, author of Orientalism, and Gayatri Chakravorty Spivak are generally considered as founders of the field of postcolonialism; other professors that have significantly contributed to the field include Hamid Dabashi, Rashid Khalidi, and Joseph Massad. The works of professors Kimberlé Crenshaw, Patricia J. Williams, and Kendall Thomas were foundational to the field of critical race theory.

Columbia and its affiliated faculty have also made significant contributions to the study of religion. The affiliated Union Theological Seminary is a center of liberal Christianity in the United States, having served as the birthplace of Black theology through the efforts of faculty including James H. Cone and Cornel West, and Womanist theology, through the works of Katie Cannon, Emilie Townes, and Delores S. Williams. Likewise, the Jewish Theological Seminary of America was the birthplace of Conservative Judaism movement in the United States, which was founded and led by faculty members including Solomon Schechter, Alexander Kohut, and Louis Ginzberg in the early 20th century, and is a major center for Jewish studies in general. Other schools of thought in the humanities to which Columbia professors made significant contributions include the Dunning School, founded by William Archibald Dunning; the anthropological schools of historical particularism and cultural relativism, founded by Franz Boas; and functional psychology, whose founders and proponents include John Dewey, James McKeen Cattell, Edward L. Thorndike, and Robert S. Woodworth.

== See also ==
- Columbia Encyclopedia
- Columbia Glacier, a glacier in Alaska, U.S., named for Columbia University
- Columbia MM, a text-based mail client developed at Columbia University
- Columbia Non-neutral Torus, a small stellarator at the Columbia University Plasma Physics Laboratory
- Columbia-Princeton Electronic Music Center, an album of electronic music released in 1961
- Columbia Revolt, a black-and-white 1968 documentary film
- Columbia Scholastic Press Association
- Columbia School of Linguistics
- Columbia Spelling Board, a historic etymological organization
- Columbia Unbecoming controversy
- Columbia University in popular culture
- Mount Columbia, a mountain in Colorado, U.S., named for Columbia University
- Nutellagate, a controversy surrounding high Nutella consumption at Columbia University
- The Strawberry Statement, a non-fiction account of the 1968 protests
- 2024 Columbia University pro-Palestinian campus occupations

== Sources ==
- "about us". Columbia University. Archived from the original on February 28, 2010.
- Groce, C. G. (1937). William Samuel Johnson: A Maker of the Constitution. New York, New York: Columbia University Press.
- "Columbia University Senate". Columbia University. Archived from the original on October 14, 2012.
- "Board of Trustees, Office of the Secretary". Columbia University. Archived from the original on April 19, 2024.
