= Eclipse of Reason (Horkheimer) =

1947 non-fiction book by Max Horkheimer

- Cover of the first edition
- Author: Max Horkheimer
- Subject: Philosophy
- Publisher: Oxford University Press
- Publication date: 1947
- Media type: Print

Eclipse of Reason is a 1947 book by Max Horkheimer, a Frankfurt School philosopher, arguing that in modernity, the concept of objective reason has been transformed from a truth-seeking means of ethical understanding into a tool for achieving practical goals. He calls this shift the "eclipse of reason", where reason becomes instrumental, and contends that it has led to the rise of authoritarianism and to the dominance of a manipulative culture industry that serves the interests of those in power. He asserts that to counter these trends, it is necessary to develop a more substantive and critical form of reason that is grounded in a commitment to human emancipation and the pursuit of a more just society.

== Summary ==
Horkheimer deals with the concept of reason within the history of Western philosophy. He defines true reason as rationality, which can only be fostered in an environment of free, critical thinking. He details the differences between objective, subjective, and instrumental reason, and writes that we have moved from the former through the center and into the latter, and that subjective and instrumental reason are interrelated.

Objective reason treats universal truths that dictate that an action is either right or wrong. It is a concrete concept and a force in the world that requires specific modes of behavior. The focus in the objective faculty of reason is on the ends, rather than the means. Subjective reason is an abstract concept of reason and focuses primarily on means (specifically, the reasonable nature of the purpose of action is irrelevant, as the ends only serve the subject's purpose, generally self-advancement or preservation). To be "reasonable" in this context is to be suited to a particular purpose, to be "good for something else". This aspect of reason is universally conforming, and easily furnishes ideology. In instrumental reason, the sole criterion of reason is its operational value or purposefulness, and with this, the idea of truth becomes contingent on mere subjective preference, relating instrumental reason to subjective reason.

Horkheimer argues that modern philosophy has increasingly advocated subjective rationality to the point of rejecting any form of meaning or objective rationality and enabling technocracy. He associates the decline in objective rationality in philosophy with a mechanical worldview, disenchantment and the decline of a belief in a living or holistic nature. Although he denounces a wide range of contemporary philosophical schools of thought, Horkheimer asserts that these trends are epitomized in positivism, a term he defines broadly.

Because subjective/instrumental reason rules, the ideals of a society, for example democratic ideals, become dependent on the "interests" of the people instead of being dependent on objective truths. Nevertheless, Horkheimer admits that objective reason has its roots in Reason ("Logos" in Greek) of the subject. He concludes,

If by enlightenment and intellectual progress we mean the freeing of man from superstitious belief in evil forces, in demons and fairies, in blind fate – in short, the emancipation from fear – then denunciation of what is currently called reason is the greatest service we can render.

== Influence ==
Horkheimer's argument in Eclipse of Reason that social repression demands the repression of the natural environment and of human nature influenced later developments in ecofeminism.

== See also ==
- Dialectic of Enlightenment – 1947 book by Max Horkheimer and Theodor W. Adorno

== Bibliography ==
- Eclipse of Reason. Oxford University Press. 1947. ISBN 9781847144645.
