= Dialogic =

Use of conversation to explore the meaning of something

Dialogic refers to the use of conversation or shared dialogue to explore the meaning of something. (This is as opposed to monologic which refers to one entity with all the information simply giving it to others without exploration and clarification of meaning through discussion.) The word "dialogic" relates to or is characterized by dialogue and its use. A dialogic is communication presented in the form of dialogue. Dialogic processes refer to implied meaning in words uttered by a speaker and interpreted by a listener. Dialogic works carry on a continual dialogue that includes interaction with previous information presented. The term is used to describe concepts in literary theory and analysis as well as in philosophy.

Along with dialogism, the term can refer to concepts used in the work of Russian philosopher Mikhail Bakhtin, especially the texts Problems of Dostoevsky's Poetics and The Dialogic Imagination: Four Essays by M.M. Bakhtin.

== Overview ==
Bakhtin contrasts the dialogic and the "monologic" work of literature. The dialogic work carries on a continual dialogue with other works of literature and other authors. It does not merely answer, correct, silence, or extend a previous work, but informs and is continually informed by the previous work. Dialogic literature is in communication with multiple works. This is not merely a matter of influence, for the dialogue extends in both directions, and the previous work of literature is as altered by the dialogue as the present one is. Though Bakhtin's "dialogic" emanates from his work with colleagues in what we now call the "Bakhtin Circle" in years following 1918, his work was not known to the West or translated into English until the 1970s. For those only recently introduced to Bakhtin's ideas but familiar with T. S. Eliot, his "dialogic" is consonant with Eliot's ideas in "Tradition and the Individual Talent," where Eliot holds that "the past should be altered by the present as much as the present is directed by the past". For Bakhtin, the influence can also occur at the level of the individual word or phrase as much as it does the work and even the oeuvre or collection of works. A German cannot use the word "fatherland" or the phrase "blood and soil" without (possibly unintentionally) also echoing (or, Bakhtin would say "refracting") the meaning that those terms took on under Nazism. Every word has a history of usage to which it responds, and anticipates a future response.

The term 'dialogic' does not only apply to literature. For Bakhtin, all language—indeed, all thought—appears as dialogical. This means that everything anybody ever says always exists in response to things that have been said before and in anticipation of things that will be said in response. In other words, we do not speak in a vacuum. All language (and the ideas which language contains and communicates) is dynamic, relational and engaged in a process of endless redescriptions of the world.

Bakhtin also emphasized certain uses of language that maximized the dialogic nature of words, and other uses that attempted to limit or restrict their polyvocality. At one extreme is novelistic discourse, particularly that of a Dostoevsky (or Mark Twain) in which various registers and languages are allowed to interact with and respond to each other. At the other extreme would be the military order (or "1984" newspeak) which attempts to minimize all orientations of the work toward the past or the future, and which prompts no response but obedience.

== Distinction between dialogic and dialectic ==
A dialogic process stands in contrast to a dialectic process (proposed by G. W. F. Hegel):

- In a dialectic process describing the interaction and resolution between multiple paradigms or ideologies, one putative solution establishes primacy over the others. The goal of a dialectic process is to merge point and counterpoint (thesis and antithesis) into a compromise or other state of agreement via conflict and tension (synthesis). "Synthesis that evolves from the opposition between thesis and antithesis." Examples of dialectic process can be found in Plato's Republic.
- In a dialogic process, various approaches coexist and are comparatively existential and relativistic in their interaction. Here, each ideology can hold more salience in particular circumstances. Changes can be made within these ideologies if a strategy does not have the desired effect.

These two distinctions are observed in studies of personal identity, national identity, and group identity.

Sociologist Richard Sennett has stated that the distinction between dialogic and dialectic is fundamental to understanding human communication. Sennett says that dialectic deals with the explicit meaning of statements, and tends to lead to closure and resolution. Whereas dialogic processes, especially those involved with regular spoken conversation, involve a type of listening that attends to the implicit intentions behind the speaker's actual words. Unlike a dialectic process, dialogics often do not lead to closure and remain unresolved. Compared to dialectics, a dialogic exchange can be less competitive, and more suitable for facilitating cooperation.

== See also ==
- Allusion
- Dialogic learning
- Dialogical analysis
- Dialogical self
- Heteroglossia
- Internal discourse
- Relational dialectics
