= Carnivalesque =

Literary genre

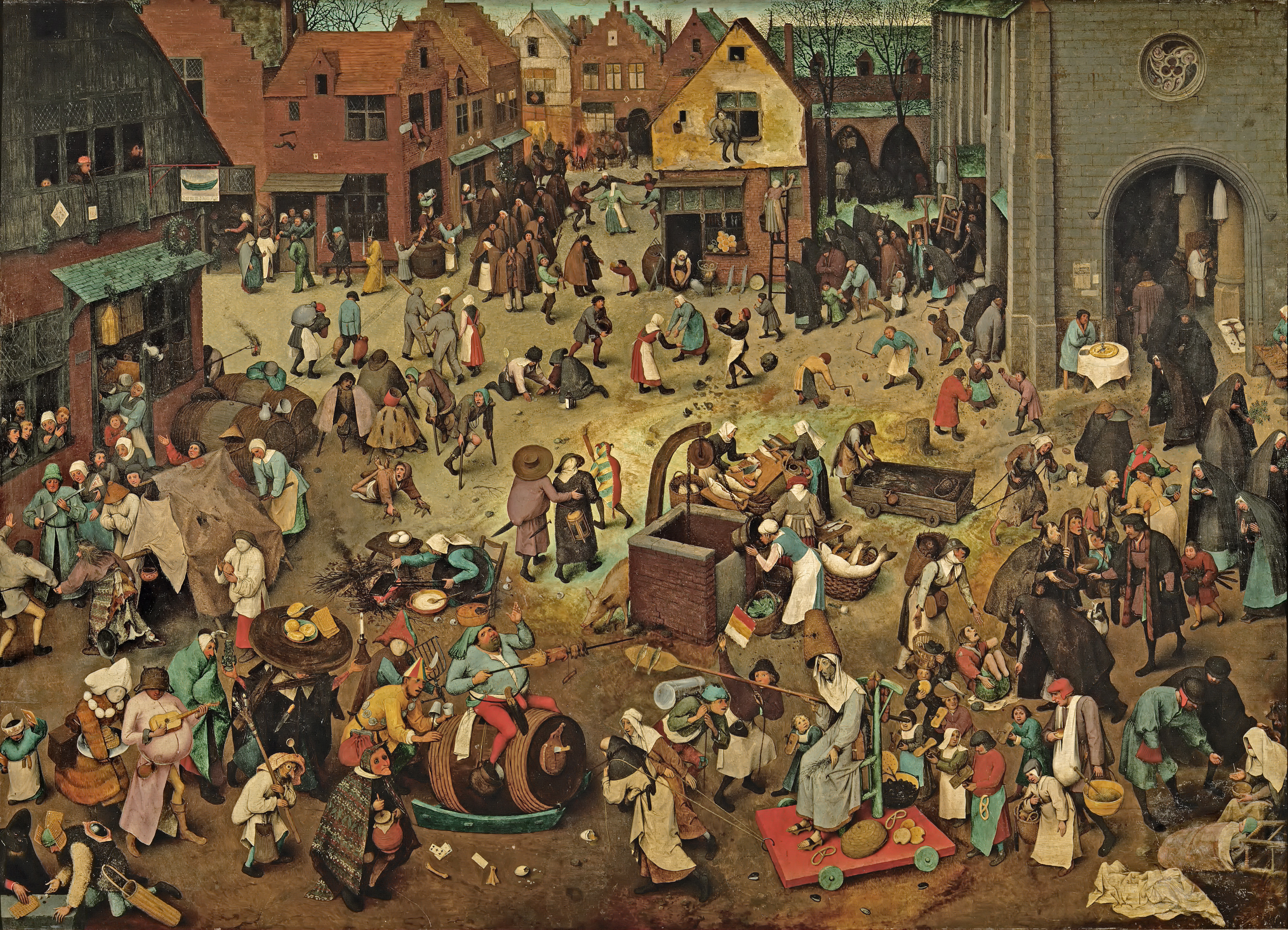
The Fight Between Carnival and Lent, by Pieter Bruegel the Elder (1559)

The Carnivalesque is a literary type that subverts and liberates the assumptions of the dominant style or atmosphere through humor and chaos. It originated as "carnival" in Mikhail Bakhtin's Problems of Dostoevsky's Poetics and was more developed in Rabelais and His World. For Bakhtin, "carnival" (the totality of popular festivities, rituals and other carnival forms) is deeply rooted in the human psyche on both the collective and individual levels. Though historically complex and varied, it has over time worked out "an entire language of symbolic concretely sensuous forms" which express a unified "carnival sense of the world, permeating all its forms". This language, Bakhtin argues, cannot be adequately verbalized or translated into abstract concepts, but it is amenable to transposition into an artistic language that resonates with its essential qualities: it can, in other words, be "transposed into the language of literature". Bakhtin calls this transposition the carnivalization of literature. Although he considers a number of literary forms and individual writers, it is François Rabelais, the French Renaissance author of Gargantua and Pantagruel, and the 19th-century Russian author Fyodor Dostoevsky, that he considers the primary exemplars of carnivalization in literature.

== Carnival sense of the world ==
Bakhtin identifies four principal categories of the carnival sense of the world.

- Familiar and free interaction between people: carnival often brought the unlikeliest of people together, those ordinarily separated by impenetrable socio-hierarchical barriers. The suspension of distance between people encouraged free interaction and free individual expression.
- Eccentricity: with the dissolution of hierarchical relationships, ordinarily unacceptable behaviour becomes acceptable. Behaviour, gesture and discourse that are normally considered eccentric and inappropriate are encouraged, permitting "the latent sides of human nature to reveal and express themselves".
- Carnivalistic mésalliances: the familiar and free format of carnival allows all dualistic separations of the hierarchical worldview to reunite in living relationship with one another — heaven and hell, the sacred and the profane, the high and the low, the great and the small, the clever and the stupid, etc.
- Profanation: in the carnival, the strict rules of piety and respect for official notions of the 'sacred' are stripped of their power — blasphemy, obscenity, debasing, 'bringing down to earth', celebration rather than condemnation of the earthly and body-based.

The primary act of carnival is the mock crowning and subsequent de-crowning of a carnival king. It is a "dualistic ambivalent ritual" that typifies the inside-out world of carnival and the "joyful relativity of all structure and order". The act sanctifies ambivalence toward that which is normally considered absolute, single, or monolithic. Carnivalistic symbols always include their opposite within themselves: "Birth is fraught with death, and death with new birth." The crowning implies the de-crowning, and the de-crowning implies a new crowning. It is thus the process of change itself that is celebrated, not that which is changed.

The carnival sense of the world "is opposed to that one-sided and gloomy official seriousness which is dogmatic and hostile to evolution and change, which seeks to absolutize a given condition of existence or a given social order." This is not to say that liberation from all authority and sacred symbols was desirable as an ideology. Because participation in Carnival extracts all individuals from non-carnival life, nihilistic and individualistic ideologies are just as impotent and just as subject to the radical humour of carnival as any form of official seriousness. The spirit of carnival grows out of a "culture of laughter". Because it is based in the physiological realities of the lower bodily stratum (birth, death, renewal, sexuality, ingestion, evacuation etc.), it is inherently anti-elitist: its objects and functions are necessarily common to all humans—"identical, involuntary and non-negotiable".

Bakhtin argues that we should not compare the "narrow theatrical pageantry" and "vulgar Bohemian understanding of carnival" characteristic of modern times with his Medieval Carnival. Carnival was a powerful creative event, not merely a spectacle. Bakhtin suggests that the separation of participants and spectators has been detrimental to the potency of Carnival. Its power lay in there being no "outside". Everyone participated, and everyone was subject to its lived transcendence of social and individual norms: "carnival travesties: it crowns and uncrowns, inverts rank, exchanges roles, makes sense from nonsense and nonsense of sense."

== Carnivalization of literature ==
Bakhtin's term the carnivalization of literature (which Morson and Emerson point out could also be called "the literization of carnival") refers to the transposition of the essential qualities of the carnival sense of the world into a literary language and a literary genre.

=== Seriocomic genres ===
The ancient seriocomic genres initiated the "carnivalistic line" in Western literature. Of these, the most significant were Socratic dialogue and Menippean satire.

According to Bakhtin, the seriocomic genres always began with "the living present". Everything took place "in a zone of immediate and even crudely familiar contact with living contemporaries." Unlike the "serious" genres (tragedy, epic, high rhetoric, lyric poetry), the seriocomic genres did not rely on legend or long-held tribal belief and custom for their legitimacy. Instead, they consciously relied on experience and free invention, often manifesting a critical and even cynical attitude toward conventional subjects and forms. They eschewed the single-voiced, single-styled nature of the serious genres, and intentionally cultivated heterogeneity of voice and style. Characteristic of these genres are "multi-toned narration, the mixing of high and low, serious and comic; the use of inserted genres – letters, found manuscripts, retold dialogues, parodies on the high genres... a mixing of prosaic and poetic speech, living dialects and jargons..." Thus in the ancient seriocomic genres, language was not merely that which represents, but itself became an object of representation.

=== Socratic dialogue ===
Originally a kind of memoir genre consisting of recollections of actual conversations conducted by Socrates, the Socratic dialogue became, in the hands of Plato, Xenophon and others, a freely creative form bound only by the Socratic method of dialogically revealing the truth. Bakhtin lists five aspects of the genre that link it to carnivalization:

- The Socratic notion of the dialogic nature of truth and human thought, posited in opposition to "official monologism, which pretends to possess a ready-made truth" (Bakhtin notes that this is a formal quality only, and that in the hands of a dogmatic school or religious doctrine, the dialogue can be transformed into merely another method for expounding a ready-made truth);
- Syncrisis, the juxtaposition of differing perspectives on an object, and anacrisis, the elicitation or provocation of a full verbal expression of the interlocutor's opinion and its underlying assumptions;
- The protagonist is always an ideologist and the interlocutors are made into ideologists, thus provoking the event of the testing of truth;
- A tendency to create the extraordinary situation (e.g. Socrates on the threshold of an impending death sentence in The Apology), which forces a deeper exposition through the loosening of the bonds of convention and habit;
- It introduces, in embryonic form, the concept of the image of an idea (which will later attain full expression in Dostoevsky): "the idea is organically combined with the image of a person... The dialogic testing of the idea is simultaneously also the testing of the person who represents it".

=== Menippean satire ===
The tradition known as Menippean satire began in ancient Greece with Antisthenes, an author of Socratic dialogues, and the Cynic satirist Menippus, although it first became recognized as a genre through the first century B.C.E. Roman scholar Varro. According to Bakhtin, the roots of the genre "reach directly back into carnivalized folklore, whose decisive influence is here even more significant than it is in the Socratic dialogue." Its characteristics include intensified comicality, freedom from established constraints, bold use of fantastic situations for the testing of truth, abrupt changes, inappropriate behaviour, abnormal or psychopathological mental states, inserted genres and multi-tonality, parodies, oxymorons, scandal scenes, and a sharp satirical focus on contemporary ideas and issues. Despite the apparent heterogeneity of these elements, Bakhtin emphasizes the internal integrity of the genre and its thorough grounding in a carnival sense of the world. He notes its unparalleled capacity for reflecting the social and philosophical ethos of its historical setting – principally the epoch of the decline of national legend, which brought with it the gradual dissolution of long-established ethical norms and a concomitant rise in free interaction and argumentation over all manner of "ultimate questions". The internal dialogical freedom of the genre is coupled with an equally free external capacity for the absorption of other genres, for example, the diatribe, the soliloquy and the symposium.

=== Dostoevsky and polyphony ===
The tradition of Menippean satire reached its summit in the nineteenth century, according to Bakhtin, in the work of Dostoevsky. Menippean satire was the fertile ground on which Dostoevsky was able to grow his entirely new carnivalized genre—the polyphonic novel. According to Bakhtin, Dostoevsky was familiar with works by Lucian (such as Dialogues of the Dead and Menippus, or The Descent Into Hades), Seneca (Apocolocyntosis), Petronius (The Satyricon), Apuleius (The Golden Ass), and possibly also the satires of Varro. He was also probably influenced by modern European manifestations of the genre in authors such as Goethe, Fénelon, Diderot, and Voltaire. Bakhtin observes that although Dostoevsky may not have consciously recognized his place as the heir of the tradition, he undoubtedly instinctively adopted many of its carnivalistic forms, as well as its liberated approach to the use of those forms, and adapted them to his own artistic purposes. The dialogic sense of truth, the device of the extraordinary situation, the unencumbered frankness of speech, the clash of extreme positions and embodied ideas over ultimate questions, the technique of anacrisis, "threshold" dialogues in extreme or fantastic situations: present in Menippean satire, these qualities are given a new and more profound life in Dostoevsky's polyphonic novel. In this "carnival space and time", a reality beyond the quotidian fog of convention and habit comes to life, allowing a special type of "purely human" dialogue to occur. In polyphony, character voices are liberated from the finalizing and monologizing influence of authorial control, much as the participants in the carnival revel in the temporary dissolution of authoritarian social definitions and "ready-made" truths, and a new dialogical truth emerges in the play of difference: a "plurality of consciousnesses, with equal rights and each with its own world, combine but are not merged in the unity of the event."

== See also ==
- Grotesque body
- Dialogue (Bakhtin)
- Culture of popular laughter

== Bibliography ==
- Bakhtin, Mikhail (1941). Rabelais and his world. Bloomington: Indiana University Press.
- Dentith, Simon (1995). Bakhtinian Thought: An introductory reader. Routledge.
- Bakhtin, Mikhail (1929). Problems of Dostoevsky's Poetics. Minneapolis, MN: University of Minnesota.
