= Gary Saul Morson =

American academic

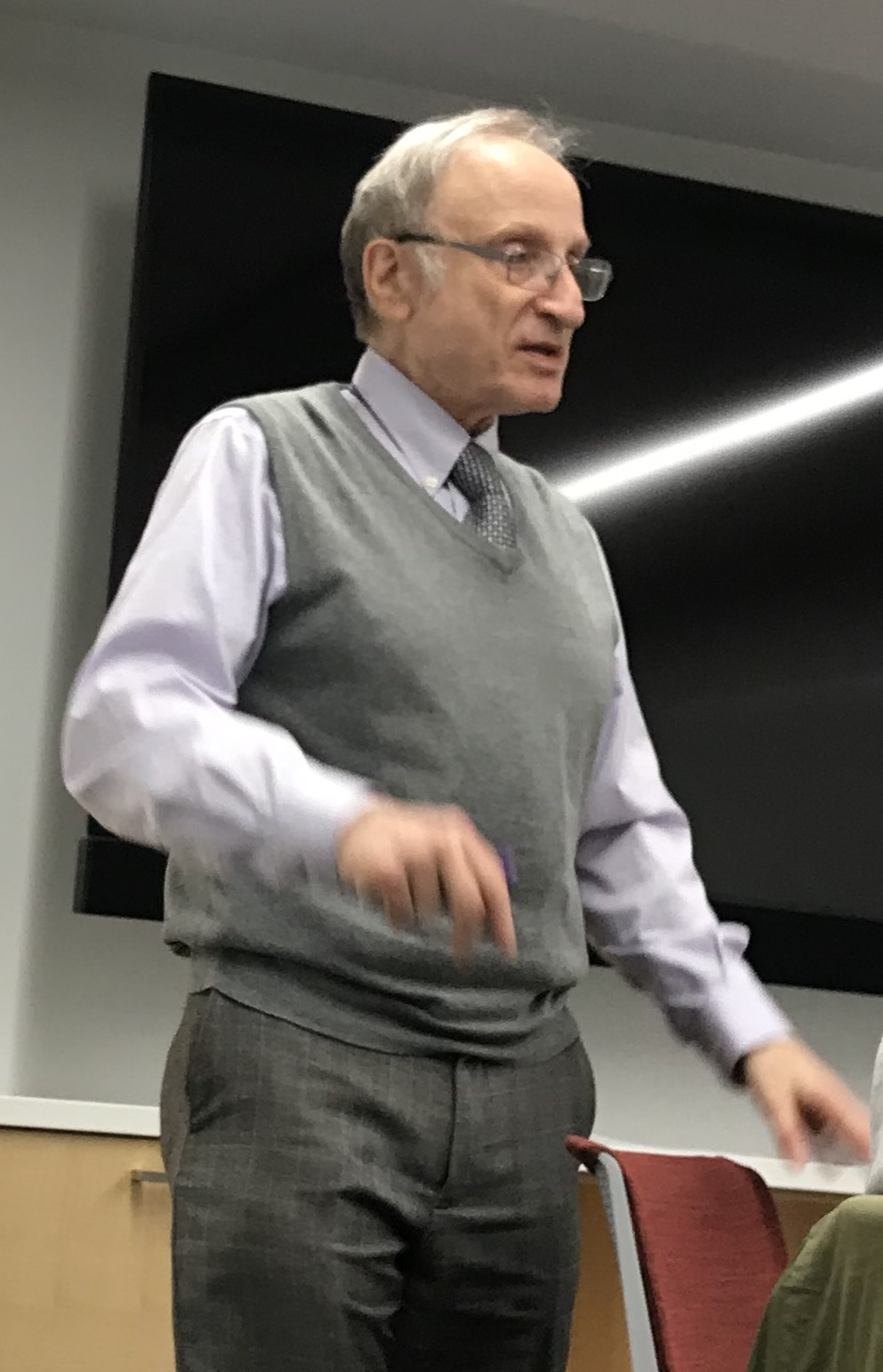
- Morson in 2018
- Born: April 19, 1948 (age 78); New York City, U.S.
- Education: Yale University (B.S., Ph.D.)
- Known for: Teaching the largest Slavic language class offered in the United States
- Scientific career
- Fields: Literary criticism
- Workplaces: Northwestern University

Gary Saul Morson (born April 19, 1948) is an American literary critic and Slavist. He is particularly known for his scholarly work on the Russian novelists Leo Tolstoy and Fyodor Dostoevsky and the literary theorist Mikhail Bakhtin. Morson is Lawrence B. Dumas Professor of the Arts and Humanities at Northwestern University. Prior to this, he was chair of the Department of Slavic Languages and Literatures at the University of Pennsylvania for many years.

== Academic career ==
Gary Saul Morson was born in New York City and attended the Bronx High School of Science. He then went to Yale University. He completed his Ph.D. degree at Yale.

In 1974 Morson started teaching at the University of Pennsylvania where he later became chair of the Department of Slavic Languages and Literatures. Since 1986 he has been teaching at Northwestern University.

Morson is the editor of a scholarly book series titled Studies in Russian Literature and Theory (SRLT) published by Northwestern University Press, which the publisher described as "reflecting trends within the field of Slavic studies over the years... providing perspectives on Russian literature from all periods and genres, as well as its place in the broader culture."

== Personal life ==
Gary Saul Morson lives in Evanston, Illinois with his wife Katharine Porter, a psychiatrist whom he married in 2004. He was previously married to Jane Ackerman Morson with whom he has two children, Emily and Alexander.

== Selected works ==
- 1981 – The Boundaries of Genre: Dostoevsky's Diary of a Writer and the Traditions of Literary Utopia (University of Texas Press) ISBN 0-292-70732-0.
- 1986 – Bakhtin, Essays and Dialogues on His Work (edited volume, University of Chicago Press) ISBN 0-226-54132-0.
- 1986 – Literature and History: Theoretical Problems and Russian Case Studies (edited volume, Stanford University Press) ISBN 0-8047-1302-2.
- 1987 – Hidden in Plain View: Narrative and Creative Potentials in War and Peace (Stanford University Press) ISBN 0-8047-1387-1.
- 1989 – Rethinking Bakhtin: Extensions and Challenges (edited with Caryl Emerson, Northwestern University Press) ISBN 0-8101-0809-7.
- 1990 – Mikhail Bakhtin: Creation of a Prosaics (with Caryl Emerson, Stanford University Press) ISBN 0-8047-1821-0.
- 1994 – Narrative and Freedom: The Shadows of Time (Yale University Press) ISBN 0-300-05882-9.
- 1995 – Freedom and Responsibility in Russian Literature: Essays in Honor of Robert Louis Jackson (edited with Elizabeth Cheresh Allen, Northwestern University Press) ISBN 0-8101-1146-2.
- 2000 – And Quiet Flows the Vodka, or When Pushkin Comes to Shove (under the pseudonym Alicia Chudo, Northwestern University Press) ISBN 0-8101-1788-6
- 2007 – Anna Karenina in Our Time: Seeing More Wisely (Yale University Press) ISBN 978-0-300-10070-9.
- 2011 – The Words of Others: From Quotations to Culture (Yale University Press) ISBN 978-0-300-16747-4.
- 2012 – The Long and Short of It: From Aphorism to Novel (Stanford University Press) ISBN 978-0-8047-8051-3.
- 2013 – Prosaics and Other Provocations: Empathy, Open Time, and the Novel (Academic Studies Press) ISBN 978-1-61811-161-6.
- 2015 – The Fabulous Future? America and the World in 2040 (edited with Morton Schapiro, Northwestern University Press) ISBN 978-0-8101-3196-5.
- 2017 – Cents and Sensibility: What Economics Can Learn From the Humanities (with Morton Schapiro, Princeton University Press) ISBN 978-0-691-17668-0.
- 2023 – Wonder Confronts Certainty: Russian Writers on the Timeless Questions and Why Their Answers Matter (Harvard University Press) ISBN 978-0-674-97180-6.

He is a main author of the entry "Russian literature" in an online version of the Encyclopædia Britannica. His critique of literalist translation methods appeared in Commentary in 2010.

== See also ==
- Russian literature
- Heteroglossia
- Chronotope
- Menippean satire
- Polyphony (literature)
