= Ensemble cast =

Cast with many actors given similar standing

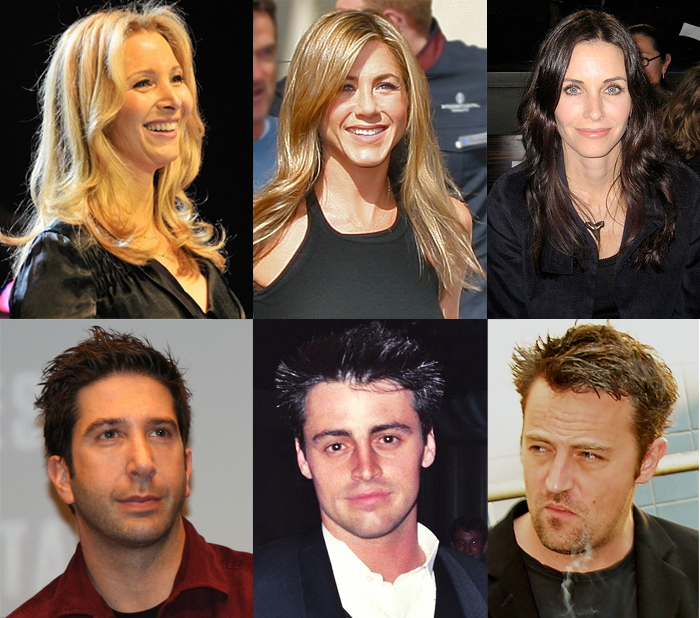
Friends' main cast, from left, clockwise: Lisa Kudrow, Jennifer Aniston, Courteney Cox, Matthew Perry, Matt LeBlanc, and David Schwimmer, share similar screen times.

In a dramatic production, an ensemble cast is one that comprises many principal actors and performers who are typically assigned roughly equal amounts of screen time.

== Structure ==
In contrast to the popular model, which gives precedence to a sole protagonist, an ensemble cast leans more towards a sense of "collectivity and community".

=== Cinema ===
Ensemble casts in film were introduced as early as September 1916, with D. W. Griffith's silent epic film Intolerance, featuring four separate though parallel plots. The film follows the lives of several characters over hundreds of years, across different cultures and time periods. The unification of different plot lines and character arcs is a key characteristic of ensemble casting in film; whether it is a location, event, or an overarching theme that ties the film and characters together.

Films that feature ensembles tend to emphasize the interconnectivity of the characters, even when the characters are strangers to one another. The interconnectivity is often shown to the audience through examples of the "six degrees of separation" theory, and allows them to navigate through plot lines using cognitive mapping. Examples of this method, where the six degrees of separation is evident in films with an ensemble cast, are in productions such as Love Actually, and Babel, which all have strong underlying themes interwoven within the plots that unify each film. Whodunit films also often feature interconnected characters as suspects, such as in Death on the Nile, Clue, and Knives Out.

The Avengers, X-Men, Suicide Squad and Justice League are four examples of ensemble casts in the superhero genre. Referential acting is a key factor in executing this balance, as ensemble cast members "play off each other rather than off reality".

Filmmakers known for their use of ensemble casts include Robert Altman, Woody Allen, Spike Lee, Quentin Tarantino, Wes Anderson, James Gunn and Paul Thomas Anderson among others.

=== Television ===
Ensemble casting also became more popular in television series because it allows flexibility for writers to focus on different characters in different episodes. In addition, the departure of players is less disruptive than would be the case with a regularly structured cast. The television series The Muppets, The Golden Girls, The Proud Family, The Simpsons, Family Guy and Friends are archetypal examples of ensemble casts in American sitcoms. The science-fiction mystery drama Lost features an ensemble cast. Ensemble casts of 20 or more actors are common in soap operas, a genre that relies heavily on the character development of the ensemble. The genre also requires continuous expansion of the cast as the series progresses, with soap operas such as General Hospital, Days of Our Lives, Coronation Street, EastEnders, Guiding Light, Neighbours, The Young and the Restless, and The Bold and the Beautiful staying on air for decades.

An example of a success for television in ensemble casting is the Emmy Award-winning HBO series Game of Thrones. The fantasy series features one of the largest ensemble casts on the small screen. The series is notorious for major character deaths, resulting in constant changes within the ensemble.

Ensemble casts are common in children's television, with both human and non-human casts. Examples include Sesame Street, Thomas & Friends, Foster's Home for Imaginary Friends, My Little Pony: Friendship is Magic, Rugrats, SpongeBob SquarePants, Total Drama, Arthur, Animaniacs, Tiny Toon Adventures, Freakazoid!, Cow and Chicken, Hey Arnold!, The Replacements, and Xiaolin Showdown.

== See also ==
- All-star
- Polyphony (literature)
- Supergroup (music)
