= Epic and Novel =

1941 essay on literary theory by Mikhail Bakhtin

Epic and Novel: Towards a Methodology for the Study of the Novel [Эпос и роман (О методологии исследования романа)] is an essay written by Mikhail Bakhtin in 1941 that compares the novel to the epic; it was one of the major literary theories of the twentieth century.

The essay was originally given as a paper in the Moscow Institute of World Literature on 24 March 1941 under the name "The Novel as a Literary Genre" ['Роман как литературный жанр']. However, it became well known after its 1970 publication (under its current name) in the Russian journal Questions of Literature [Вопросы Литературы]. It was re-published in a 1975 collection of Bakhtin's writings, Questions of Literature and Aesthetics [Вопросы литературы и эстетики]. The essay, along with others from this collection, was translated into English by Michael Holquist and Caryl Emerson in their publication The Dialogic Imagination: Four Essays by M.M. Bakhtin.

In vol. 3 of Bakhtin's Collected Writings [Собрание сочинений], published in 2012, this article appears under Bakhtin's original title ("The Novel as a Literary Genre"), and with the opening paragraph, edited out from earlier publications, restored. Also published are Bakhtin's notes for the lecture, on which the article is based, and a partial transcript of the discussion that followed the lecture. As the newly published material reveals, Bakhtin framed this article as a study in the philosophy of genres.

== Summary ==
In this essay, Bakhtin attempts to outline a theory of the novel and its unique properties by comparing it to other literary forms, in particular the epic. Bakhtin sees the novel as capable of achieving much of what other forms cannot, including an ability to engage with contemporary reality, and an ability to re-conceptualize the individual in a complex way that interrogates his subjectivity and offers the possibility of redefining his own image. He also stresses the novel's flexibility: he argues it is a genre with the unique ability to constantly adapt and change, partly because there is no generic canon of the novel as there is for epic or lyric poetry.

The epic, on the other hand, is a ‘high-distance genre’. That is, its form and structure situate it in a distant past that assumes a finished quality, meaning it cannot be re-evaluated, re-thought or changed by us. Bakhtin compares the novel to clay, a material which can be remodeled, and the epic to marble, which cannot. The epic past is one that is irretrievable and idealized: it is valorized in a way that makes it appear hierarchically superior to the present. The epic form is a ‘walled’ one, meaning it builds boundaries which block it off from the present. The individual in the epic is a fully finished and completed lofty hero who is entirely ‘externalized’: his appearance, actions and internal world are external characteristics which are literally expressed in the written word.

While Bakhtin does make reference to proto-novels in antiquity, he places the rise of the modern novel in the Renaissance and suggests that it developed then precisely because of a new temporal perspective: man had become conscious of the present not only as a continuation of the past, but also as a ‘heroic and new beginning’. This allowed the novel, a genre that was concerned with the possibilities of the present, to flourish. The novel was "the only genre born of this new world and in total affinity with it" (Bakhtin 1981:7), and was therefore the most apt form for literary expression in the modern world.

One interesting observation in the essay is the ability of the novel to influence and ‘novelize’ other genres. Bakhtin argues that the prominence of the novel caused other genres to adapt themselves and try to treat time in the same way as the novel. He gives the specific example of Lord Byron's Childe Harold as a poem that adopted certain novelistic features.
