= Valentin Voloshinov =

Russian-Soviet linguist and Marxist theorist

Valentin Voloshinov

Valentin Nikolaevich Voloshinov (Russian: Валенти́н Никола́евич Воло́шинов; June 18, 1895, St. Petersburg – June 13, 1936, Leningrad) was a Russian Soviet linguist, whose work has been influential in the field of literary theory and Marxist theory of ideology.

== Biography ==
Details of Voloshinovs's early life is unclear but it is believed he was born in to the family of an attorney. In his youth, he was a member of the mystical Rosicrucian society where he befriended Anastasia and Marina Tsvetayeva. Even before the revolution, he became a close friend of Mikhail Bakhtin, a participant in the Nevel school of philosophy.

Voloshinov studied at the Faculty of Law of Petrograd University but his studies were interrupted in 1916. From 1919 to 1922, he lived in Nevel, later in Vitebsk where he published several articles on music, gave lectures on art history and literature at the Proletarian University founded by Pavel Medvedev in Vitebsk. In 1922, following Medvedev, he returned to Petrograd, where, after he and Bakhtin moved there in the spring of 1924, their close communication continued. He performed poems and musical sketches in the salon of pianist Maria Yudina.

After graduating from Leningrad University, he was a postgraduate student of the Research Institute of Comparative History of Literature and Languages of the West and East and later an associate professor at the Herzen Pedagogical Institute.

In the 1920s, after turning from mysticism to Marxism, Voloshinov translated several linguistics texts into Russian, including works by Karl Bühler and Ernst Cassirer.

He was arrested and incarcerated in the 1930s. In the last years of his life, Voloshinov was seriously ill and was cut off from his work and even reading. He died from tuberculosis in a tuberculosis sanatorium in Detskoye Selo, Leningrad.

Some scholars believe that works bearing Voloshinov's name were actually authored by his colleague Mikhail Bakhtin, although the topic is still the subject of debate; a few of these works have been added to reprinted editions of Bakhtin's collected works. Additional scholarship provides evidence that Voloshinov, not Bakhtin, authored the Voloshinov-signed texts. Some scholars argue that attributing the disputed texts to Bakhtin allowed Western criticism to engage the texts' dialogism while setting aside the Marxist, historical materialist commitments Voloshinov made explicit.

== Discourse in Life and Discourse in Art ==
Voloshinov's 1926 essay Discourse in Life and Discourse in Art: Concerning Sociological Poetics analyzes literary and linguistic form from a historical materialist, sociological perspective. Voloshinov critiques the Formalist distinction between everyday and poetic language, arguing that all speech is aesthetic and socially-situated (p. 98), and all theories of art are theories of society (pp. 95-96). Influences on the essay include the work of Karl Bühler and of Gestalt theory.

== Freudianism ==
In Freudianism (first published in Russian in 1927), Voloshinov applied his Marxist, sociological theory of language to psychoanalysis and contemporary psychology. Voloshinov critiques Freudianism as an exemplar of subjective psychology, rooted in bourgeois, ruling class ideology. He attributes Freud's popularity to the bourgeois "fear of history" manifesting in historical periods of ruling class decline, including those of Ancient Greece, Rome, and pre-revolutionary France (p. 11). Throughout the text, Voloshinov critiques Freudianism for mistaking the sociological for the biological.

Due to the book's Marxist commitments, Emerson (1991) argues that it is unlikely that the non-Marxist Bakhtin authored or co-authored the text (p. 33). Petrilli (2016) suggests that Freudianism anticipates the poststructuralist critiques of Lacan, Deleuze, and Guattari.

== Marxism and the Philosophy of Language ==
Published in 1929, Voloshinov's Marxism and the Philosophy of Language (Russian: Марксизм и философия языка, romanized: Marksizm i filosofija jazyka) attempts to incorporate the field of linguistics into Marxism. The book's main inspiration does not come from previous Marxists, whom Voloshinov saw as largely indifferent towards the study of language. Voloshinov's theories are instead built on critical engagement with Wilhelm von Humboldt's concept of language as a continuous creative or "generative" process, and with the view of language as a sign-system posited by Ferdinand de Saussure. To some extent, Voloshinov's linguistic thought is also mediated by the analyses of his Soviet contemporary Nicholas Marr.

For Voloshinov, language is the medium of ideology, and cannot be separated from ideology. Ideology, however, is not to be understood in the classical Marxist sense as an illusory mental phenomenon that arises as a reflex of a "real" material economic substructure. Language, as a socially constructed sign-system, is what allows consciousness to arise, and is in itself a material reality. Because of this belief that language and human consciousness are closely related, Voloshinov holds that the study of verbal interaction is key to understanding social psychology. Voloshinov further argues for understanding psychological mechanisms within a framework of ideological function in his book Freudianism: A Marxist critique.

Voloshinov argues that it is a mistake to study language abstractly and synchronically (i.e. in an unhistorical manner), as Saussure does. For Voloshinov, words are dynamic social signs, which take different meanings for different social classes in different historical contexts. The meaning of words is not subject to passive understanding, but includes the active participation of both the speaker (or writer) and hearer (or reader). While every word is a sign taken from an inventory of available signs, the manipulation of the word contained in each speech act or individual utterance is regulated by social relations. In Voloshinov's view, the meaning of verbal signs is the arena of continuous class struggle: a ruling class will try to narrow the meaning of social signs, making them "uni-accentual", but the clash of various class-interests in times of social unrest will make clear the "multi-accentuality" of words.

By virtue of his belief that the "struggle for meaning" coincides with class struggle, Voloshinov's theories have much in common with those of Italian Communist Antonio Gramsci, who shared an interest in linguistics. Voloshinov's work can also be seen to prefigure many of the concerns of poststructuralism.

Voloshinov devotes the last portion of Marxism and the Philosophy of Language to a treatment of reported speech in order to show social and temporal relations between utterances to be integral properties of language. This was taken up by Roman Jakobson in an essay entitled: "Shifters and Verbal Categories," and influenced the development of the Prague School of functional linguistics as well as linguistic anthropology.

Through an entirely parallel evolution, Voloshinov's model of dialogism, of meaning being functionally contextual and of cognition/consciousness emerging from verbal behaviour, prefigured the empirically derived poststructuralist model of language and cognition Relational Frame Theory which emerged in the 1990s, and upon which CBT and ACT therapies are based.

== See also ==
- Charles Sanders Peirce
- György Lukács
- Lev Vygotsky
- Otto Jespersen
- Pavel Nikolaevich Medvedev
- Russian formalism
