= Problems of Dostoevsky's Poetics =

1963 book by Mikhail Bakhtin

Problems of Dostoevsky's Poetics (Russian: Проблемы поэтики Достоевского, Problemy poètiki Dostoevskogo) is a book by the 20th century Russian philosopher and literary theorist Mikhail Bakhtin. It was originally published in 1929 in Leningrad under the title Problems of Dostoevsky's Creative Art (Russian: Проблемы творчества Достоевского, Problemy tvorčestva Dostoevskogo) but was re-published with significant additions under the new title in 1963 in Moscow. The book was first translated into English in 1973 by R. William Rotsel but this version is now out of print. Caryl Emerson's 1984 translation is the version now used for academic discussion in English.

Problems of Dostoevsky's Poetics is considered to be a seminal work in Dostoevsky studies as well as an important contribution to literary theory. Bakhtin introduces a number of key concepts, such as polyphony and carnivalisation, to elucidate what he saw as unique in Dostoevsky's literary art. He argues that Dostoevsky's works are essentially dialogical, unfolding on the basis of interaction between autonomous voices, as opposed to monological, where plot and character unfold within the confines of a single authorial universe. In consequence, it is argued that attempts to expound Dostoevsky's novels from any sort of monological critical perspective will always fail to penetrate them.

== Summary of the work ==
There are 5 chapters, a brief preface ("From the Author") and a Conclusion. In the Preface, Bakhtin writes: "We consider Dostoevsky one of the greatest innovators in the realm of artistic form. He created a completely new type of artistic thinking, which we have provisionally called polyphonic. This type of artistic thinking found its expression in Dostoevsky's novels, but its significance extends far beyond the limits of the novel and touches upon several basic principles of European aesthetics. It could even be said that Dostoevsky created something like a new artistic model of the world, one in which many basic aspects of old artistic form were subjected to a radical restructuring. The present work aims at bringing out, through theoretical literary analysis, this fundamental innovation of Dostoevsky."

=== Chapter 1: Dostoevsky's Polyphonic Novel and Its Treatment in Critical Literature ===
Bakhtin begins by identifying polyphony as the chief characteristic of Dostoevsky's work: "A plurality of independent and unmerged voices and consciousnesses, a genuine polyphony of fully valid voices..." The discussion of polyphony and its incommensurability with the usual monological approach to writing and criticism is followed by an overview of the currently available scholarly literature on Dostoevsky, particularly that from Russia. Each critic or theorist is assessed according to the degree to which they approach an understanding of polyphony as the essential quality of Dostoevsky's writing.

=== Chapter 2: The Hero, and the Position of the Author with Regard to the Hero, in Dostoevsky's Art ===
According to Bakhtin, Dostoevsky is not interested in characters as individuals or social types occupying a specific place in the author's universe, where who or what they are is fixed, defined, and limited by certain 'objective' qualities. The hero interests Dostoevsky as a "particular point of view on the world and on oneself." Dostoevsky thus carries out a kind of "Copernican revolution" in fiction by making subjectivity and self-consciousness the basis for a character's exposition, so that even the functions usually reserved for the author or narrator (descriptions, characterisations, definitions, etc) are transferred into the field of vision of the character themselves: "the author no longer illuminates the hero's reality but the hero's self-consciousness." Alongside the hero's consciousness, only other equally self-defining and self-validating consciousnesses can be juxtaposed. There can be no overriding authorial or narratorial voice: such a voice can only be another voice in the polyphonic texture. Bakhtin calls self-consciousness Dostoevsky's "artistic dominant".

=== Chapter 3: The Idea in Dostoevsky ===
In Dostoevsky, the hero's discourse about himself is merged with his ideological discourse about the world. There is an "artistic fusion" of personal life and worldview that strengthens the integrity of self-signification in the face of the myriad forms of external definition. This fusion lends an unprecedented power to the idea in Dostoevsky. In a character of the monological type, an idea becomes "a mere aspect of reality, one more of reality's predetermined features": in Dostoevsky, it acquires the power to live in the world through its fusion with an unfinalized consciousness in its interaction with others of the same kind. The idea, as Dostoevsky understood it, is not some sort of entity residing within a person's head, it is a "live event" played out in the realm of inter-subjectivity. Like the word, the idea inherently seeks the other's response: it is by nature dialogic. Its outwardly monologic form is merely the conventional form of expression that has emerged, according to Bakhtin, from the trend toward ideological monologism characteristic of modern times.

=== Chapter 4: Characteristics of Genre and Plot Composition in Dostoevsky's Works ===
In the earlier work, this chapter only discussed the function of the adventure plot in Dostoevsky's novels. In the revised work it is greatly expanded to include discussions of Dostoevsky's place at the end of a literary tradition going back to the ancient world (Menippean satire), and his translation of the folk carnival ethos—where conventional behaviours and attitudes are suspended, undermined or overturned—into the literary realm (Carnivalisation).

=== Chapter 5: Discourse in Dostoevsky ===
Bakhtin argues that dialogic interactions of the kind found in Dostoevsky are not reducible to forms that are studiable by linguistics and can only be understood as discourse. The discursive word is never separate from a subject who utters it in address to another subject: the word must be embodied for it to have any dialogical status. Bakhtin identifies three main types of discourse: (i) unmediated discourse directed exclusively toward its referential object; (ii) objectified discourse (of a represented person); (iii) discourse with an orientation toward someone else's discourse (double-voiced discourse). It is this third type in its various forms (for example, internal dialogization) that is of primary interest to Bakhtin in his investigation into the dialogical process and its striking presence in Dostoevsky's writing.

== Key concepts ==
=== Polyphony ===
According to Bakhtin, Dostoevsky was the creator of the polyphonic novel, and it was a fundamentally new genre that could not be analysed according to preconceived frameworks and schema that might be useful for other manifestations of the European novel. Dostoevsky does not describe characters and contrive plot within the context of a unified, author-imposed reality: rather his function as author is to illuminate the self-consciousness of the characters so that each participates on their own terms, in their own voice, according to their own ideas about themselves and the world. The author's worldview is not absent, but this worldview does not define, limit or qualify the other voices, and hence cannot directly control how events will unfold. It is present only as another participant in "the great dialogue", with no more capacity for direct signification than any other voice. Bakhtin calls this multi-voiced, dialogic reality "polyphony".

What unfolds... is not a multitude of characters and fates in a single objective world, illuminated by a single authorial consciousness; rather a plurality of consciousnesses, with equal rights and each with its own world, combine but are not merged in the unity of the event. Dostoevsky's major heroes are, by the very nature of his creative design, not only objects of authorial discourse but also subjects of their own directly signifying discourse.

He later describes it as "the event of interaction between autonomous and internally unfinalized consciousnesses."

=== Unfinalizability ===
Bakhtin summarizes the general principle behind unfinalizability in Dostoevsky thus:

Nothing conclusive has yet taken place in the world, the ultimate word of the world and about the world has not yet been spoken, the world is open and free, everything is still in the future and will always be in the future.

On the individual level, this means that a person can never be entirely externally finalized. The ability to never be entirely enclosed in the dictates of the outside world is an essential attribute of consciousness. Though external objectification (definition, description, causal or genetic explanation, etc.) is inevitable, it can never be the whole truth, devoid of the living, dialogical response. That is what Bakhtin calls a "monologic" truth, and he is highly critical of tendencies in Western thought that seek to finalize humanity and individual humans, in this way. According to Bakhtin, Dostoevsky always wrote in opposition to currents of thought that turn human beings into objects (scientific, economic, social, psychological, etc.), enclosing them in an alien web of definition and causation, robbing them of freedom and responsibility: "He saw in it a degrading reification of a person's soul, a discounting of its freedom and its unfinalizability... Dostoevsky always represents a person on the threshold of a final decision, at a moment of crisis, at an unfinalizable, and unpredeterminable, turning point for their soul."

=== Carnivalization ===
Bakhtin derives his concept of carnival from ancient, medieval and Renaissance carnival traditions, which are united in their essential qualities by what he calls a "carnival sense of the world". Carnivalization is the translation of these essential qualities into the literary realm, beginning with the ancient seriocomic genres, such as Socratic Dialogue and Menippean Satire, and reaching its highest point in the novels of Rabelais and Dostoevsky. The concept suggests an ethos where normal hierarchies, social roles, proper behaviors and assumed truths are subverted in favor of the "joyful relativity" of free participation in the festival. Gary Saul Morson and Caryl Emerson call Bakhtin's carnival "the apotheosis of unfinalizability". Carnival, through its temporary dissolution or reversal of conventions, generates the 'threshold' situations where disparate individuals come together and express themselves on an equal footing, without the oppressive constraints of social objectification: the usual preordained hierarchy of persons and values becomes an occasion for laughter, its absence an opportunity for creative interaction. In carnival, "opposites come together, look at one another, are reflected in one another, know and understand one another." Bakhtin sees carnivalization in this sense as a basic principle of Dostoevsky's art: love and hate, faith and atheism, loftiness and degradation, love of life and self-destruction, purity and vice, etc. "everything in his world lives on the very border of its opposite." Bakhtin emphasizes that the carnival mode of being and thinking is not based in abstraction, but in a creative participation in the intensities of real life. Like the traditional carnival, which is not merely a spectacle to be passively experienced, the carnivalized literary text implies the participation of the reader in the great dialogue. Carnivalistic categories are not "abstract thoughts about equality and freedom, the interrelatedness of all things or the unity of opposites... they are concretely sensuous ritual-pageant "thoughts" experienced and played out in the form of life itself, "thoughts" that had coalesced and survived for thousands of years among the broadest masses of European mankind", and therein lies the source of their power in literary forms.

=== Menippean satire ===
Bakhtin discusses the development of Menippean satire from its origins in ancient Greece with the Cynic satirist Menippus and examines its essential characteristics. These characteristics include intensified comicality, freedom from established constraints, bold use of fantastic situations for the testing of truth, abrupt changes, inserted genres and multi-tonality, parodies, oxymorons, scandal scenes, inappropriate behaviour, and a sharp satirical focus on contemporary ideas and issues. According to Bakhtin, the roots of the genre "reach directly back into carnivalized folklore". He notes its unparalleled capacity for reflecting the social and philosophical ethos of its ancient historical setting – principally the epoch of the decline of national legend, which brought with it the gradual dissolution of long-established ethical norms and a concomitant rise in free interaction and argumentation over all manner of "ultimate questions". Bakhtin credits Dostoevsky with revitalizing the genre and enhancing it with his own innovation in form and structure: the polyphonic novel. Although he may not have consciously recognized his place as the heir of the tradition, he undoubtedly instinctively adopted many of its carnivalistic forms, as well as its liberated approach to the use of those forms, and adapted them to his own artistic purposes. In polyphony, the dialogical freedom of Menippean satire is taken to a new and more profound level: character voices are liberated from the finalizing and monologizing influence of authorial control, much as the participants in carnival revel in the temporary dissolution of authoritarian social definitions and established truths, allowing a new type of "purely human" dialogue to emerge.

=== Double-voiced discourse ===
In Dostoevsky "almost no word is without its intense sideward glance at someone else's word." There is a great diversity of discursive styles characterised by their orientation toward another's discourse, which Bakhtin calls double-voiced discourse. The diversity is underscored by the continual sudden transition from one style to another: "from parody to internal polemic, from polemic to hidden dialogue, from hidden dialogue to stylization in serene hagiographic tones, then back to parodistic narration, and finally to an extremely intense open dialogue... All this is interwoven with the deliberately dull thread of informative documentary discourse..." But even this dry documentary discourse registers "the bright reflections or dense shadows of nearby utterances".

In the monological novel, the author's ultimate semantic authority is always exerted over whatever discourse types are introduced. Intensifying the accents of others' discourse only serves the ultimate purpose of accentuating the author's own ideological concerns; the outcome of the struggle for dominance between voices is decided in advance; sooner or later everything is gathered together in a single voice representing that of the author. Dostoevsky goes in the opposite direction: his artistic purposes are served by the activation and intensification of autonomous voices in their relation to each other. His aim is a plurality of voices, not homogenization. Discourse is almost never "objectified" in Dostoevsky: his novels live and develop in the dialogical interaction of subjective voices and consciousnesses, and thus no particular voice, even and especially that of the author, can have the capacity for finalization of another. According to Bakhtin,

"the orientation of one person to another person's discourse and consciousness is, in essence, the basic theme of all Dostoevsky's works. The hero's attitude toward himself is inseparably bound up with his attitude toward another, and with the attitude of another toward him. His consciousness of self is constantly perceived against the backdrop of the other's consciousness of him—"I for myself" against the backdrop of "I for another"."

In addition to the ubiquitous "word with a sideward glance", Bakhtin identifies what he calls "the word with a loophole". The self, though aware that it is constituted in its dialogue with the other, also insists upon its own unfinalizability, and retains for itself the possibility of assigning the final meaning to its own words. The word with a loophole is a penultimate word masquerading as an ultimate word: the possibility of reinterpretation, should the other's real or imagined response imply a finalization, accompanies this apparently definite word "like a shadow". The most extreme example of this type of discourse is to be found in the character of the Underground Man in Notes From Underground.

== See also ==
- Rabelais and His World
- Dialogue (Bakhtin)
