= Logosphere =

Concept in semantics and sociology

Logosphere (Greek from logos / nous) (coined by Mikhail Bakhtin) is an adaptation of the concepts biosphere and noosphere: logosphere is derived from the interpretation of words' meanings, conceptualized through an abstract sphere.

== Overview ==
The logosphere is not active like Vernadsky’s noosphere, but still occupies a type of four-dimensional space.

The chronotope is the conduit through which meaning enters the logosphere.

Mikhail Bakhtin's chronotope, or time-space (deterministic) makes outside-the-logosphere (unintelligible) information relevant to the logosphere through narrative structure. Time takes on a protagonist's 'flesh'.

The adventure chronotope is thus characterized by a technical, abstract connection between space and time, by the reversibility of moments in a temporal sequence, and by their interchangeability in space. ...Every concretization, of even the most simple and everyday variety, would introduce its own rule-generating force, its own order, its inevitable ties to human life and to the time specific to that life. ...Biographical time is not reversible vis-à-vis the events of life itself, which are inseparable from historical events. But with regard to character, such time is reversible[.]

— Mikhail Bakhtin

== Logosphere applications ==
=== Technological conceptualizations ===
The term was later taken up by virtual reality enthusiasts to describe the logical universe.

=== Telecommunications ===
The logosphere, in decades past, has been used in reference to the new world of communication created by the invention of the radio. French philosopher Gaston Bachelard proclaimed, "Everyone can hear everyone else and we can all listen in peace." This "domain of world speech" should be called the logosphere, he reasoned.
