= Rabelais and His World =

1965 book by Mikhail Bakhtin

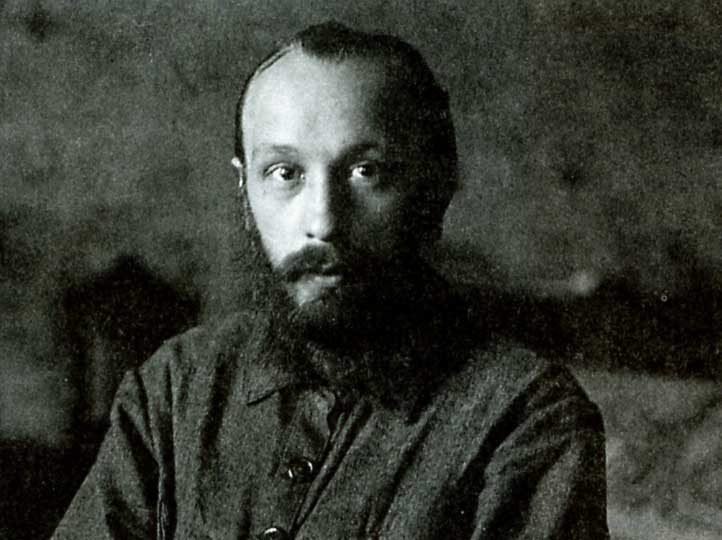
Mikhail Bakhtin, author of Rabelais and His World, pictured in 1920

Rabelais and His World (Russian: Творчество Франсуа Рабле и народная культура средневековья и Ренессанса, Tvorčestvo Fransua Rable i narodnaja kul'tura srednevekov'ja i Renessansa; 1965) is a scholarly work by the 20th century Russian philosopher and literary critic Mikhail Bakhtin. It is considered to be a classic of Renaissance studies, and an important work in literary studies and cultural interpretation.

The book explores the cultural ethos of the Middle Ages and Renaissance as depicted by the French Renaissance writer François Rabelais, particularly in his novel Gargantua and Pantagruel. Bakhtin argues that for centuries Rabelais's work has been misunderstood. He attempts to redress this and clarify Rabelais's intentions through recovery of sections of Gargantua and Pantagruel that were previously either ignored or suppressed, and analysis of the Renaissance social system in order to discover the balance between language that was permitted and language that was not. Bakhtin identifies two important subtexts: carnival, which he describes as a social institution, and grotesque realism, which he defines as a literary mode. Rabelais and His World examines the interaction between the social and the literary, as well as the meaning of the body.

== History of the text ==
Bakhtin completed his book on Rabelais (titled Rabelais in the History of Realism) in 1940. After several attempts to get the book published fell through, it was submitted as a dissertation for the Candidate of Sciences degree at the Gorky Institute of World Literature in Moscow. At the dissertation's defense in 1946, all three official opponents were in favor of awarding Bakhtin a higher doctoral degree, the Doctor of Sciences, and their motion was accepted with a narrow majority vote. However, following an assault on the institute published in the press at the time, and after six years of repeated revisions and deliberations, USSR's VAK decided Bakhtin would only receive the Candidate of Sciences degree (roughly equivalent to a research doctorate). The book was eventually published in Russian in 1965, under the title Rabelais and Folk Culture of the Middle Ages and Renaissance. Its 1968 English translation by Hélène Iswolsky was given the title, Rabelais and His World. A new translation (by Sergeiy Sandler) with extensive scholarly apparatus came out in 2025.

== Carnival ==
For Bakhtin, carnival is associated with the collectivity. Those attending a carnival do not merely constitute a crowd; rather the people are seen as a whole, organized in a way that defies socioeconomic and political organization. According to Bakhtin, "[A]ll were considered equal during carnival. Here, in the town square, a special form of free and familiar contact reigned among people who were usually divided by the barriers of caste, property, profession, and age." The carnival atmosphere holds the lower strata of life most important, as opposed to higher functions (thought, speech, soul) which were usually held dear in the signifying order. At carnival time, the unique sense of time and space causes individuals to feel they are a part of the collectivity, at which point they cease to be themselves. It is at this point that, through costume and mask, an individual exchanges bodies and is renewed. At the same time there arises a heightened awareness of one's sensual, material, bodily unity and community.

== Grotesque ==
In the grotesque body, emphasis is placed on the open, the penetrative, and the "lower stratum." The open (the mouth, the anus, the vagina, etc.) and the penetrative (the nose, the penis, etc.) allow exchange between the body and the world (mostly through sex, eating, and drinking), but also to produce degrading material (curses, urine, feces, etc.). The lower stratum (belly, womb, etc.) is the place where renewal happens, where new life is forged, thus connecting degradation to renewal. The grotesque body is one of unashamed excess, anathema to authority and pious austerity.

Bakhtin's notion of carnival is connected with that of the grotesque. In the carnival, usual social hierarchies and proprieties are upended; emphasis is placed on the body in its open dimension, in its connection to the life of the community. This emphasis on the material dimension which links humans, rather than on the differences and separations between them, allows for the consciousness of the continuity of human life as a whole: for every death, there is a birth, a renewal of the human spirit. This process allows for progress. Due to its inscription in time and its emphasis on bodily changes (through eating, evacuation, and sex), the grotesque has been interpreted by some critics as a dimension of the body that allows perception of the historicity of man: in this reading it is used as a measuring device.

== History of laughter ==
Bakhtin opens this work with a quotation from Alexander Herzen: "It would be extremely interesting to write the history of laughter".

One of the primary expressions of the ancient world's conceptions of laughter is the text that survives in the form of apocryphal letters of Hippocrates about Democritus (Hippocratic Corpus, Epistles 10–21). The laughter of Democritus had a philosophical character, being directed at the life of man and at all the vain fears and hopes related to the gods and to life after death. Democritus here made of his laughter a complete conception of the world, a certain spiritual premise of the man who has attained maturity and has awakened. Hippocrates finally perfectly agreed with him.

== See also ==
- Problems of Dostoevsky's Poetics
