= Chronotope =

Concept in literary theory

In literary theory and philosophy of language, the chronotope is how configurations of time and space are represented in language and discourse. The term was taken up by Russian literary scholar Mikhail Bakhtin who used it as a central element in his theory of meaning in language and literature. The term itself comes from the Russian xронотоп, which in turn is derived from the Greek χρόνος ('time') and τόπος ('space'); it thus can be literally translated as "time-space." Bakhtin developed the term in his 1937 essay "Forms of Time and of the Chronotope in the Novel" («Формы времени и хронотопа в романе»). Here Bakhtin showed how different literary genres operated with different configurations of time and space, which gave each genre its particular narrative character.

== Overview ==
For Bakhtin, chronotope is the conduit through which meaning enters the logosphere. Genre is rooted in how one perceives the flow of events and its representation of particular worldviews or ideologies.

Bakhtin scholars Caryl Emerson and Michael Holquist state that the chronotope is "a unit of analysis for studying language according to the ratio and characteristics of the temporal and spatial categories represented in that language". They argue that Bakhtin's concept differs from other uses of time and space in literary analysis because neither category is given a privileged status: they are inseparable and entirely interdependent. Bakhtin's concept is a way of analyzing literary texts that reveals the forces operating in the cultural system from which they emanate. Specific chronotopes are said to correspond to particular genres, or relatively stable ways of speaking, which themselves represent particular worldviews or ideologies.

In the essay Forms of Time and of the Chronotope in the Novel, Bakhtin describes his use of the term thus:

We will give the name chronotope (literally, 'time space') to the intrinsic connectedness of temporal and spatial relationships that are artistically expressed in literature. This term [space-time] is employed in mathematics, and was introduced as part of Einstein's Theory of Relativity. The special meaning it has in relativity theory is not important for our purposes; we are borrowing it for literary criticism almost as a metaphor (almost, but not entirely). What counts for us is the fact that it expresses the inseparability of space and time (time as the fourth dimension of space). We understand the chronotope as a formally constitutive category of literature; we will not deal with the chronotope in other areas of culture.

In the literary artistic chronotope, spatial and temporal indicators are fused into one carefully thought-out, concrete whole. Time, as it were, thickens, takes on flesh, becomes artistically visible; likewise, space becomes charged and responsive to the movements of time, plot and history. This intersection of axes and fusion of indicators characterizes the artistic chronotope.

The chronotope in literature has an intrinsic generic significance. It can even be said that it is precisely the chronotope that defines genre and generic distinctions, for in literature the primary category in the chronotope is time. The chronotope as a formally constitutive category determines to a significant degree the image of man in literature as well. The image of man is always intrinsically chronotopic.

Unlike Kant, who saw time and space as transcendental pre-conditions of experience, Bakhtin regards them as "forms of the most immediate reality". They are not mere "mathematical" abstractions, but have a concrete and, depending on context, qualitatively variable form. This is particularly noticeable in Bakhtin's own object of study—that of artistic cognition in literary genres—but he implies that it is applicable in other contexts as well. Different structures or orders of the universe cannot be assumed to operate within the same chronotope. For example, the chronotope of a biological organism like an ant will be qualitatively different from that of an organism like an elephant, or from that of a structure of a different order entirely, such as a star or a galaxy. Within the human world itself there is a huge variety of social activities that are defined by qualitatively different time/space fusions.

== Examples and use in other sciences ==
The concept of the chronotope has been widely used in literary studies. The scholar Timo Müller for example argued that analysis of chronotopes highlights the environmental dimension of literary texts because it draws attention to the concrete physical spaces in which stories take place. Müller discusses the chronotope of the road, which for Bakhtin was a meeting place but in recent literature no longer brings people together in this way because automobiles have changed the way we perceive the time and space of the road. Car drivers want to minimize the time they spend on the road. They are rarely interested in the road as a physical space, the natural environment around the road, or the environmental implications of their driving. This contrasts with earlier literary examples such as Robert Frost's poem "The Road Not Taken" or John Steinbeck's novel The Grapes of Wrath, where the road is described as part of the natural environment and the travelers are interested in that environment.

Linguistic anthropologist Keith Basso invoked "chronotopes" in discussing Western [Apache] stories linked with places. In the 1980s when Basso was writing, geographic features reminded the Western Apache of "the moral teachings of their history" by recalling to mind events that occurred there in important moral narratives. By merely mentioning "it happened at [the place called] 'men stand above here and there,'" storyteller Nick Thompson could remind locals of the dangers of joining "with outsiders against members of their own community." Geographic features in the Western Apache landscape are chronotopes, Basso says, in precisely the way Bakhtin defines the term when he says they are "points in the geography of a community where time and space intersect and fuse. Time takes on flesh and becomes visible for human contemplation; likewise, space becomes charged and responsive to the movements of time and history and the enduring character of a people. ...Chronotopes thus stand as monuments to the community itself, as symbols of it, as forces operating to shape its members' images of themselves" (qtd. in Basso 1984: 44–45).

Anthropologist of syncretism Safet HadžiMuhamedović built upon Bakhtin’s term in his ethnography of the Field of Gacko in the southeastern Bosnian highlands. In Waiting for Elijah: Time and Encounter in a Bosnian Landscape, he argued that people and landscapes may sometimes be trapped between timespaces and thus "schizochronotopic" (from the Greek σχίζειν (skhizein): "to split"). He described two overarching chronotopes as "collective timespace themes", both of which relied on certain kinds of past and laid claims to the Field’s future. One was told through proximities, the other through distances between religious communities. For Hadži Muhamedović, schizochronotopia is a rift occurring within the same body/landscape, through which the past and the present of place have rendered each other unbidden.

The concept of chronotope is also used in tourism research. Sociologist Hasso Spode explains the emergence of tourism in the 18th century as "time travel backwards". The tourist space thus functions as a romantic chronotopia. Anthropologist Antonio Nogués-Pedregal regards the touristic consuming and shaping of places as a chronotope.

The chronotope has also been adopted for the analysis of classroom events and conversations, for example by Raymond Brown and Peter Renshaw in order to view "student participation in the classroom as a dynamic process constituted through the interaction of past experience, ongoing involvement, and yet-to-be-accomplished goals" (2006: 247–259). Kumpulainen, Mikkola, and Jaatinen (2013) examined the space–time configurations of students’ technology-mediated creative learning practices over a year-long school musical project in a Finnish elementary school. The findings of their study suggest that "blended practices appeared to break away from traditional learning practices, allowing students to navigate in different time zones, spaces, and places with diverse tools situated in their formal and informal lives" (2013: 53).

Chronotope has been further employed as a concept in the study of film narrative. Writing for Australian Feminist Studies, Timothy Laurie argues that a chronotope of moral progress, linked in particular to the connection between childhood and adulthood for troubled men, can be found across films such as Boyz n the Hood (1991), Australian Rules (2002), Batman Begins (2005), Romulus, My Father (2007), and True History of the Kelly Gang (2019).

== See also ==
- Mikhail Bakhtin
- The Dialogic Imagination: Four Essays by M.M. Bakhtin
- Logosphere
- Literary theory
- Philosophy of language
- Spacetime
