= Mikhail Bakhtin =

Russian philosopher and literary theorist (1895–1975)

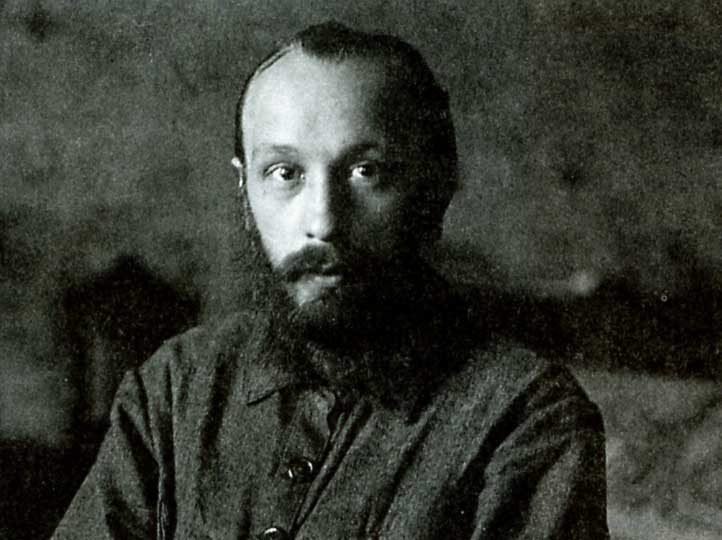
- Bakhtin in 1920
- Born: Mikhail Mikhailovich Bakhtin; 16 November [O.S. 4 November] 1895; Oryol, Russian Empire
- Died: 7 March 1975 (aged 79); Moscow, Russian SFSR, Soviet Union

Education
- Education: Odessa University (attended); Petrograd Imperial University

Philosophical work
- Era: 20th-century philosophy
- Region: Russian philosophy
- School: Neo-Kantianism (early); Dialogism (later)
- Institutions: Mordovian Pedagogical Institute
- Main interests: literary theory, literary criticism
- Notable ideas: Heteroglossia, dialogue, chronotope, carnivalesque, polyphony

Mikhail Mikhailovich Bakhtin (/ˈbɑːxtɪn/; Russian: Михаил Михайлович Бахтин, IPA: [mʲɪxɐˈil mʲɪˈxajləvʲɪdʑ bɐxˈtʲin]; 16 November [O.S. 4 November] 1895 – 7 March 1975) was a Russian philosopher and literary critic who worked on the philosophy of language, ethics, and literary theory. His writings, on a variety of subjects, inspired scholars working in a number of different traditions (Marxism, semiotics, structuralism, religious criticism) and in disciplines as diverse as literary criticism, history, philosophy, sociology, anthropology, and psychology. Although Bakhtin was active in the debates on aesthetics and literature that took place in the Soviet Union in the 1920s, his distinctive position did not become well known until he was rediscovered by Soviet scholars in the 1960s.

== Early life ==
Bakhtin was born in Oryol, Russia, to an old family of the nobility. His father was a bank manager who worked in several cities. For this reason Bakhtin spent his early childhood years in Oryol, in Vilnius, and then in Odessa, where in 1913 he joined the historical and philological faculty at the local university (the Odessa University). Katerina Clark and Michael Holquist write: "Odessa..., like Vilnius, was an appropriate setting for a chapter in the life of a man who was to become the philosopher of heteroglossia and carnival. The same sense of fun and irreverence that gave birth to Babel's Rabelaisian gangster or to the tricks and deceptions of Ostap Bender, the picaro created by Ilf and Petrov, left its mark on Bakhtin." He later transferred to Petrograd Imperial University to join his brother Nikolai. It is here that Bakhtin was greatly influenced by the classicist F. F. Zelinsky, whose works contain the beginnings of concepts elaborated by Bakhtin.

== Career ==
Bakhtin completed his studies in 1918. He then moved to a small city in western Russia, Nevel (Pskov Oblast), where he worked as a schoolteacher for two years. It was at that time that the first "Bakhtin Circle" formed. The group consisted of intellectuals with varying interests, but all shared a love for the discussion of literary, religious, and political topics. Included in this group were Valentin Voloshinov; Matvei Isaevich Kagan; Lev Vasilievich Pumpianskii; Ivan Ivanovich Sollertinskii; and, eventually, P. N. Medvedev, who joined the group later in Vitebsk. Vitebsk was "a cultural centre of the region" the perfect place for Bakhtin "and other intellectuals [to organize] lectures, debates and concerts." German philosophy was the topic talked about most frequently and, from this point forward, Bakhtin considered himself more a philosopher than a literary scholar. It was in Nevel, also, that Bakhtin worked tirelessly on a large work concerning moral philosophy that was never published in its entirety. However, in 1919, a short section of this work was published and given the title "Art and Responsibility". This piece constitutes Bakhtin's first published work. Bakhtin relocated to Vitebsk in 1920. It was here, in 1921, that Bakhtin married Elena Aleksandrovna Okolovič. Later, in 1923, Bakhtin was diagnosed with osteomyelitis, a bone disease that ultimately led to amputation of a leg in 1938. This illness hampered his productivity, but it helped him evade worse punishment after his arrest.

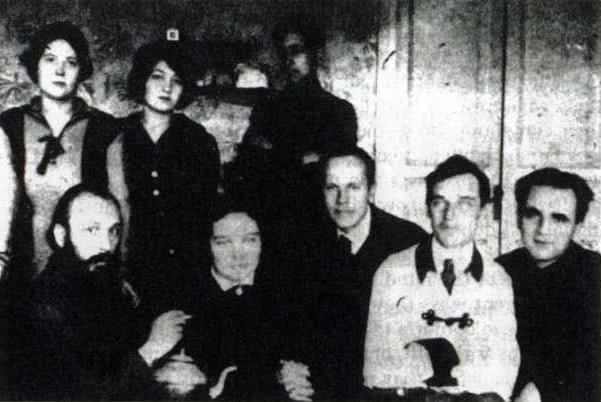
Bakhtin Circle, Leningrad, 1924–26.

In 1924, Bakhtin moved to Leningrad, where he assumed a position at the Historical Institute and provided consulting services for the State Publishing House. It is at this time that Bakhtin decided to share his work with the public, but, just before "On the Question of the Methodology of Aesthetics in Written Works" was to be published, the journal in which it was to appear stopped publication. This work was eventually published 51 years later. Repression and misplacement of his manuscripts would plague Bakhtin throughout his career. In 1929, "Problems of Dostoevsky's Art", Bakhtin's first major work, was published. It is here that Bakhtin introduces the concept of dialogism. However, just as this book was introduced, on 8 December 1928, right before Voskresenie's 10th anniversary, Meyer, Bakhtin and a number of others associated with Voskresenie were apprehended by the Soviet secret police, the OGPU. The leaders received sentences of up to ten years in labor camps of Solovki, though after an appeal to consider the state of his health, Bakhtin's sentence was commuted to exile to Kazakhstan, where he and his wife spent six years in Kustanai (now Kostanay). In 1936, they moved to Saransk (then in Mordovian ASSR, now the Republic of Mordovia), where Bakhtin taught at the Mordovian Pedagogical Institute.

During the six years he spent working as a bookkeeper in the town of Kustanai, he wrote several important essays, including "Discourse in the Novel". In 1936, living in Saransk, he became an obscure figure in a provincial college, dropping out of view and teaching only occasionally. In 1937, Bakhtin moved to Savelovo, across the river from Kimry, a town located one hundred kilometers from Moscow. Here, he completed work on a book concerning the 18th-century German novel, which was subsequently accepted by the Sovetskii Pisatel' Publishing House. However, the only copy of the manuscript disappeared during the upheaval caused by the German invasion of 1941.

After the amputation of a leg in 1938, Bakhtin's health improved and he became more prolific. In 1940, and until the end of World War II, Bakhtin lived in Moscow, where he submitted a dissertation on François Rabelais to the Gorky Institute of World Literature to obtain a postgraduate title, although the dissertation could not be defended until the war ended. In 1946 and 1949, the defense of this dissertation divided the scholars of Moscow into two groups: those official opponents guiding the defense, who accepted the original and unorthodox manuscript, and those other professors who were against the manuscript's acceptance. The book's earthy, anarchic topic was the cause of many arguments that ceased only when the government intervened. Ultimately, Bakhtin was denied a higher doctoral degree (Doctor of Sciences) and granted a lesser degree (Candidate of Sciences, a research doctorate), by the State Accrediting Bureau. Later, Bakhtin was invited back to Saransk, where he took on the position of chair of the General Literature Department at the Mordovian Pedagogical Institute. When, in 1957, the Institute changed from a teachers' college to a university, Bakhtin became head of the Department of Russian and World Literature. In 1961, Bakhtin's deteriorating health forced him to retire, and in 1969, in search of medical attention, he moved back to Moscow, where he lived until his death in 1975.

Bakhtin's works and ideas gained popularity only after his death, and he endured difficult conditions for much of his professional life, a time in which information was often seen as dangerous and therefore was often hidden. As a result, the details provided now are often of uncertain accuracy. Also contributing to the imprecision of these details is the limited access to Russian archival information during Bakhtin's life. It was only after the archives became public that scholars realized that much of what they thought they knew about Bakhtin's life was false or skewed, largely by Bakhtin himself.

== Works and ideas ==
=== Toward a Philosophy of the Act ===
Toward a Philosophy of the Act was first published in the USSR in 1986 with the title K filosofii postupka. The manuscript, written between 1919 and 1921, was found in bad condition with pages missing and sections of text that were illegible. Consequently, this philosophical essay appears today as a fragment of an unfinished work.Toward a Philosophy of the Act comprises only an introduction, of which the first few pages are missing, and part one of the full text. However, Bakhtin's intentions for the work were not altogether lost: he provided an outline in the introduction, in which he stated that the essay was to contain four parts. The first part of the essay provides an analysis of performed acts or deeds that comprise "the world actually experienced", as opposed to "the merely thinkable world." For the three subsequent and unfinished parts of Toward a Philosophy of the Act, Bakhtin states the topics he intended to discuss: the second part would have dealt with aesthetic activity and the ethics of artistic creation; the third with the ethics of politics; and the fourth with religion.

Toward a Philosophy of the Act reveals a Bakhtin in the process of developing his moral system by decentralizing the work of Kant, with a focus on ethics and aesthetics. It is here that Bakhtin lays out three claims regarding the acknowledgment of the uniqueness of one's participation in Being:

1. I both actively and passively participate in Being.
2. My uniqueness is given but it simultaneously exists only to the degree to which I actualize this uniqueness (in other words, it is in the performed act and deed that has yet to be achieved).
3. Because I am actual and irreplaceable I must actualize my uniqueness.

Bakhtin further states: "It is in relation to the whole actual unity that my unique thought arises from my unique place in Being." Bakhtin deals with the concept of morality whereby he attributes the predominating legalistic notion of morality to human moral action. According to Bakhtin, the I cannot maintain neutrality toward moral and ethical demands which manifest themselves as one's voice of consciousness.

It is here also that Bakhtin introduces an "architectonic" or schematic model of the human psyche, consisting of three components: "I-for-myself", "I-for-the-other", and "other-for-me". The I-for-myself is an unreliable source of identity; Bakhtin argues that it is the I-for-the-other through which human beings develop a sense of identity. The I-for-the-other serves as an amalgamation of the way in which others view the subject. Conversely, other-for-me describes the way in which others incorporate the subject's perceptions of them into their own identities. Identity, as Bakhtin describes it here, does not belong merely to the individual. Instead, it is shared by all.

=== Problems of Dostoevsky's Poetics: polyphony and unfinalizability ===
During his time in Leningrad, Bakhtin shifted his view away from the philosophy characteristic of his early works and towards the notion of dialogue. It was at this time that he began his engagement with the work of Fyodor Dostoevsky. Problems of Dostoevsky's Poetics is considered to be Bakhtin's seminal work, a work in which he introduces a number of important concepts. The work was originally published in Russia as Problems of Dostoevsky's Creative Art (Russian: Проблемы творчества Достоевского) in 1929, but was revised and extended in 1963 under the new title. It is the later work that is best known in the West.

The concept of unfinalizability is particularly important to Bakhtin's analysis of Dostoevsky's approach to character, although he frequently discussed it in other contexts. He summarises the general principle behind unfinalizability in Dostoevsky thus:

Nothing conclusive has yet taken place in the world, the ultimate word of the world and about the world has not yet been spoken, the world is open and free, everything is still in the future and will always be in the future.

On the individual level, this means that a person can never be entirely externally defined: the ability to never be fully enclosed by others' objectifications is essential to subjective consciousness. Though external finalization (definition, description, causal or genetic explanation etc) is inevitable and even necessary, it can never be the whole truth, devoid of the living response. Bakhtin is critical of what he calls the monologic tradition in Western thought that seeks to finalize humanity, and individual humans, in this way. He argues that Dostoevsky always wrote in opposition to ways of thinking that turn human beings into objects (scientific, economic, social, psychological etc.) – conceptual frameworks that enclose people in an alien web of definition and causation, robbing them of freedom and responsibility: "He saw in it a degrading reification of a person's soul, a discounting of its freedom and its unfinalizability... Dostoevsky always represents a person on the threshold of a final decision, at a moment of crisis, at an unfinalizable, and unpredeterminable, turning point for their soul."

'Carnivalization' is a term used by Bakhtin to describe the techniques Dostoevsky uses to disarm this increasingly ubiquitous enemy and make true intersubjective dialogue possible. The "carnival sense of the world", a way of thinking and experiencing that Bakhtin identifies in ancient and medieval carnival traditions, has been transposed into a literary tradition that reaches its peak in Dostoevsky's novels. The concept suggests an ethos where normal hierarchies, social roles, proper behaviors and assumed truths are subverted in favor of the "joyful relativity" of free participation in the festival. According to Morson and Emerson, Bakhtin's carnival is "the apotheosis of unfinalizability". Carnival, through its temporary dissolution or reversal of conventions, generates the 'threshold' situations where disparate individuals come together and express themselves on an equal footing, without the oppressive constraints of social objectification: the usual preordained hierarchy of persons and values becomes an occasion for laughter, its absence an opportunity for creative interaction. In carnival, "opposites come together, look at one another, are reflected in one another, know and understand one another." Bakhtin sees carnivalization in this sense as a basic principle of Dostoevsky's art: love and hate, faith and atheism, loftiness and degradation, love of life and self-destruction, purity and vice, etc. "everything in his world lives on the very border of its opposite."

Carnivalization and its generic counterpart—Menippean satire—were not a part of the earlier book, but Bakhtin discusses them at great length in the chapter "Characteristics of Genre and Plot Composition in Dostoesky's Works" in the revised version. He traces the origins of Menippean satire back to ancient Greece, briefly describes a number of historical examples of the genre, and examines its essential characteristics. These characteristics include intensified comicality, freedom from established constraints, bold use of fantastic situations for the testing of truth, abrupt changes, inserted genres and multi-tonality, parodies, oxymorons, scandal scenes, inappropriate behaviour, and a sharp satirical focus on contemporary ideas and issues. Bakhtin credits Dostoevsky with revitalizing the genre and enhancing it with his own innovation in form and structure: the polyphonic novel.

According to Bakhtin, Dostoevsky was the creator of the polyphonic novel, and it was a fundamentally new genre that could not be analysed according to preconceived frameworks and schema that might be useful for other manifestations of the European novel. Dostoevsky does not describe characters and contrive plot within the context of a single authorial reality: rather his function as author is to illuminate the self-consciousness of the characters so that each participates on their own terms, in their own voice, according to their own ideas about themselves and the world. Bakhtin calls this multi-voiced reality "polyphony": "a plurality of independent and unmerged voices and consciousnesses, a genuine polyphony of fully valid voices..." Later he defines it as "the event of interaction between autonomous and internally unfinalized consciousnesses."

=== Rabelais and His World: carnival and grotesque ===
During World War II Bakhtin submitted a dissertation on the French Renaissance writer François Rabelais which was not defended until some years later. The controversial ideas discussed within the work caused much disagreement, and it was consequently decided that Bakhtin be denied his higher doctorate. Thus, due to its content, Rabelais and Folk Culture of the Middle Ages and Renaissance was not published until 1965, at which time it was given the title Rabelais and His World (Russian: Творчество Франсуа Рабле и народная культура средневековья и Ренессанса, Tvorčestvo Fransua Rable i narodnaja kul'tura srednevekov'ja i Renessansa).

In Rabelais and His World, a classic of Renaissance studies, Bakhtin concerns himself with the openness of Gargantua and Pantagruel; however, the book itself also serves as an example of such openness. Throughout the text, Bakhtin attempts two things: he seeks to recover sections of Gargantua and Pantagruel that, in the past, were either ignored or suppressed, and conducts an analysis of the Renaissance social system in order to discover the balance between language that was permitted and language that was not. It is by means of this analysis that Bakhtin pinpoints two important subtexts: the first is carnival (carnivalesque) which Bakhtin describes as a social institution, and the second is grotesque realism which is defined as a literary mode. Thus, in Rabelais and His World Bakhtin studies the interaction between the social and the literary, as well as the meaning of the body and the material bodily lower stratum.

In Rabelais and His World, Bakhtin intentionally refers to the distinction between official festivities and folk festivities. While official festivities aim to supply a legacy for authority, folk festivities have a critical centrifugal social function. Carnival in this sense is categorized as a folk festivity by Bakhtin.

In his chapter on the history of laughter, Bakhtin advances the notion of its therapeutic and liberating force, arguing that "laughing truth, expressed in curses and abusive words, degraded power".

=== The Dialogic Imagination: chronotope and heteroglossia ===
The Dialogic Imagination (first published as a whole in 1975) is a compilation of four essays concerning language and the novel: "Epic and Novel" (1941), "From the Prehistory of Novelistic Discourse" (1940), "Forms of Time and of the Chronotope in the Novel" (1937–1938), and "Discourse in the Novel" (1934–1935). It is through the essays contained within The Dialogic Imagination that Bakhtin introduces the concepts of heteroglossia, dialogism and chronotope, making a significant contribution to the realm of literary scholarship. Bakhtin explains the generation of meaning through the "primacy of context over text" (heteroglossia), the hybrid nature of language (polyglossia) and the relation between utterances (intertextuality). Heteroglossia is "the base condition governing the operation of meaning in any utterance." To make an utterance means to "appropriate the words of others and populate them with one's own intention." Bakhtin's deep insights on dialogicality represent a substantive shift from views on the nature of language and knowledge by major thinkers such as Ferdinand de Saussure and Immanuel Kant.

In "Epic and Novel", Bakhtin demonstrates the novel's distinct nature by contrasting it with the epic. By doing so, Bakhtin shows that the novel is well-suited to the post-industrial civilization in which we live because it flourishes on diversity. It is this same diversity that the epic attempts to eliminate from the world. According to Bakhtin, the novel as a genre is unique in that it is able to embrace, ingest, and devour other genres while still maintaining its status as a novel. Other genres, however, cannot emulate the novel without damaging their own distinct identity.

"From the Prehistory of Novelistic Discourse" is a less traditional essay in which Bakhtin reveals how various different texts from the past have ultimately come together to form the modern novel.

"Forms of Time and of the Chronotope in the Novel" introduces Bakhtin's concept of chronotope. This essay applies the concept in order to further demonstrate the distinctive quality of the novel. The word chronotope literally means "time space" (a concept he refers to that of Einstein) and is defined by Bakhtin as "the intrinsic connectedness of temporal and spatial relationships that are artistically expressed in literature." In writing, an author must create entire worlds and, in doing so, is forced to make use of the organizing categories of the real world in which the author lives. For this reason chronotope is a concept that engages reality.

The final essay, "Discourse in the Novel", is one of Bakhtin's most complete statements concerning his philosophy of language. It is here that Bakhtin provides a model for a history of discourse and introduces the concept of heteroglossia. The term heteroglossia refers to the qualities of a language that are extralinguistic, but common to all languages. These include qualities such as perspective, evaluation, and ideological positioning. In this way most languages are incapable of neutrality, for every word is inextricably bound to the context in which it exists.

=== Speech Genres and Other Late Essays ===
In Speech Genres and Other Late Essays Bakhtin moves away from the novel and concerns himself with the problems of method and the nature of culture. There are six essays that comprise this compilation: "Response to a Question from the Novy Mir Editorial Staff", "The Bildungsroman and Its Significance in the History of Realism", "The Problem of Speech Genres", "The Problem of the Text in Linguistics, Philology, and the Human Sciences: An Experiment in Philosophical Analysis", "From Notes Made in 1970–71", and "Toward a Methodology for the Human Sciences".

"Response to a Question from the Novy Mir Editorial Staff" is a transcript of comments made by Bakhtin to a reporter from a monthly journal called Novy Mir that was widely read by Soviet intellectuals. The transcript expresses Bakhtin's opinion of literary scholarship whereby he highlights some of its shortcomings and makes suggestions for improvement.

"The Bildungsroman and Its Significance in the History of Realism" is a fragment from one of Bakhtin's lost books. The publishing house to which Bakhtin had submitted the full manuscript was blown up during the German invasion and Bakhtin was in possession of only the prospectus. However, due to a shortage of paper, Bakhtin began using this remaining section to roll cigarettes. So only a portion of the opening section remains. This remaining section deals primarily with Goethe.

"The Problem of Speech Genres" deals with the difference between Saussurean linguistics and language as a living dialogue (translinguistics). In a relatively short space, this essay takes up a topic about which Bakhtin had planned to write a book, making the essay a rather dense and complex read. It is here that Bakhtin distinguishes between literary and everyday language. According to Bakhtin, genres exist not merely in language, but rather in communication. In dealing with genres, Bakhtin indicates that they have been studied only within the realm of rhetoric and literature, but each discipline draws largely on genres that exist outside both rhetoric and literature. These extraliterary genres have remained largely unexplored. Bakhtin makes the distinction between primary genres and secondary genres, whereby primary genres legislate those words, phrases, and expressions that are acceptable in everyday life, and secondary genres are characterized by various types of text such as legal, scientific, etc. Secondary (complex) genres alter and absorb various primary (simple) genres: a novel contains everyday dialogs which yet serve the artistic purpose of the novel as a whole.

"The Problem of the Text in Linguistics, Philology, and the Human Sciences: An Experiment in Philosophical Analysis" is a compilation of the thoughts Bakhtin recorded in his notebooks. These notes focus mostly on the problems of the text, but various other sections of the paper discuss topics he has taken up elsewhere, such as speech genres, the status of the author, and the distinct nature of the human sciences. However, "The Problem of the Text" deals primarily with dialogue and the way in which a text relates to its context. Speakers, Bakhtin claims, shape an utterance according to three variables: the object of discourse, the immediate addressee, and a superaddressee. This is what Bakhtin describes as the tertiary nature of dialogue.

"From Notes Made in 1970–71" appears also as a collection of fragments extracted from notebooks Bakhtin kept during the years of 1970 and 1971. It is here that Bakhtin discusses interpretation and its endless possibilities. According to Bakhtin, humans have a habit of making narrow interpretations, but such limited interpretations only serve to weaken the richness of the past.

The final essay, "Toward a Methodology for the Human Sciences", originates from notes Bakhtin wrote during the mid-seventies and is the last piece of writing Bakhtin produced before he died. In this essay he makes a distinction between dialectic and dialogics and comments on the difference between the text and the aesthetic object. It is here also, that Bakhtin differentiates himself from the Formalists, who, he felt, underestimated the importance of content while oversimplifying change, and the Structuralists, who too rigidly adhered to the concept of "code."

== Disputed texts ==
Some of the works which bear the names of Bakhtin's close friends V. N. Voloshinov and P. N. Medvedev have been attributed to Bakhtin – particularly Marxism and Philosophy of Language and The Formal Method in Literary Scholarship. These claims originated in the early 1970s and received their earliest full articulation in English in Clark and Holquist's 1984 biography of Bakhtin. In the years since then, however, most scholars have come to agree that Vološinov and Medvedev ought to be considered the true authors of these works. Although Bakhtin undoubtedly influenced these scholars and may even have had a hand in composing the works attributed to them, it now seems clear that if it was necessary to attribute authorship of these works to one person, Voloshinov and Medvedev respectively should receive credit. Bakhtin had a difficult life and career, and few of his works were published in an authoritative form during his lifetime. As a result, there is substantial disagreement over matters that are normally taken for granted: in which discipline he worked (was he a philosopher or literary critic?), how to periodize his work, and even which texts he wrote (see below). He is known for a series of concepts that have been used and adapted in a number of disciplines: dialogism, the carnivalesque, the chronotope, heteroglossia and "outsidedness" (the English translation of a Russian term vnenakhodimost, sometimes rendered into English—from French rather than from Russian—as "exotopy"). Together these concepts outline a distinctive philosophy of language and culture that has at its center the claims that all discourse is in essence a dialogical exchange and that this endows all language with a particular ethical or ethico-political force.

== Legacy ==
As a literary theorist, Bakhtin is associated with the Russian Formalists, and his work is compared with that of Juri Lotman; in 1963 Roman Jakobson mentioned him as one of the few intelligent critics of Formalism. During the 1920s, Bakhtin's work tended to focus on ethics and aesthetics in general. Early pieces such as Towards a Philosophy of the Act and Author and Hero in Aesthetic Activity are indebted to the philosophical trends of the time—particularly the Marburg school neo-Kantianism of Hermann Cohen, including Ernst Cassirer, Max Scheler and, to a lesser extent, Nicolai Hartmann. Bakhtin began to be discovered by scholars in 1963, but it was only after his death in 1975 that authors such as Julia Kristeva and Tzvetan Todorov brought Bakhtin to the attention of the Francophone world, and from there his popularity in the United States, the United Kingdom, and many other countries continued to grow. In the late 1980s, Bakhtin's work experienced a surge of popularity in the West.

Bakhtin's primary works include Toward a Philosophy of the Act, an unfinished portion of a philosophical essay; Problems of Dostoyevsky's Art, to which Bakhtin later added a chapter on the concept of carnival and published with the title Problems of Dostoyevsky's Poetics; Rabelais and His World, which explores the openness of the Rabelaisian novel; The Dialogic Imagination, whereby the four essays that comprise the work introduce the concepts of dialogism, heteroglossia, and chronotope; and Speech Genres and Other Late Essays, a collection of essays in which Bakhtin concerns himself with method and culture.

In the 1920s there was a "Bakhtin school" in Russia, in line with the discourse analysis of Ferdinand de Saussure and Roman Jakobson.

=== Influence ===
He is known today for his interest in a wide variety of subjects, ideas, vocabularies, and periods, as well as his use of authorial disguises, and for his influence (alongside György Lukács) on the growth of Western scholarship on the novel as a premiere literary genre. As a result of the breadth of topics with which he dealt, Bakhtin has influenced such Western schools of theory as Neo-Marxism, Structuralism, Social constructionism, and Semiotics. Bakhtin's works have also been useful in anthropology, especially theories of ritual. However, his influence on such groups has, somewhat paradoxically, resulted in narrowing the scope of Bakhtin's work. According to Clark and Holquist, rarely do those who incorporate Bakhtin's ideas into theories of their own appreciate his work in its entirety.

While Bakhtin is traditionally seen as a literary critic, there can be no denying his impact on the realm of rhetorical theory. Among his many theories and ideas Bakhtin indicates that style is a developmental process, occurring within both the user of language and language itself. His work instills in the reader an awareness of tone and expression that arises from the careful formation of verbal phrasing. By means of his writing, Bakhtin has enriched the experience of verbal and written expression which ultimately aids the formal teaching of writing. Some even suggest that Bakhtin introduces a new meaning to rhetoric because of his tendency to reject the separation of language and ideology. According to Leslie Baxter, for Bakhtin, "all language use is riddled with multiple voices (to be understood more generally as discourses, ideologies, perspectives, or themes)" and thus "meaning-making in general can be understood as the interplay of those voices."

Bakhtin's concept of heteroglossia has influenced education research approaches to studying dialogue and discourse in learning environments.

=== Bakhtin and communication studies ===
Bakhtin has been called "the philosopher of human communication". Kim argues that Bakhtin's theories of dialogue and literary representation are potentially applicable to virtually all academic disciplines in the human sciences. According to White, Bakhtin's dialogism represents a methodological turn towards "the messy reality of communication, in all its many language forms." While Bakhtin's works focused primarily on text, interpersonal communication is also key, especially when the two are related in terms of culture. Kim states that "culture as Geertz and Bakhtin allude to can be generally transmitted through communication or reciprocal interaction such as a dialogue."

==== Communication and culture ====
According to Leslie Baxter, "Bakhtin's life work can be understood as a critique of the monologization of the human experience that he perceived in the dominant linguistic, literary, philosophical, and political theories of his time." He was "critical of efforts to reduce the unfinalizable, open, and multivocal process of meaning-making in determinate, closed, totalizing ways." For Baxter, Bakhtin's dialogism enables communication scholars to conceive of difference in new ways. The background of a subject must be taken into consideration when conducting research into their understanding of any text, since "a dialogic perspective argues that difference (of all kinds) is basic to the human experience." Culture and communication become inextricably linked, as one's understanding of a given utterance, text, or message, is contingent upon one's cultural background and experience.

Kim argues that "his ideas of art as a vehicle oriented towards interaction with its audience in order to express or communicate any sort of intention is reminiscent of Clifford Geertz's theories on culture."

==== Carnivalesque and communication ====
Sheckels contends that "what [... Bakhtin] terms the 'carnivalesque' is tied to the body and the public exhibition of its more private functions [...] it served also as a communication event [...] anti-authority communication events [...] can also be deemed 'carnivalesque'." Essentially, the act of turning society around through communication, whether it be in the form of text, protest, or otherwise serves as a communicative form of carnival, according to Bakhtin. Steele furthers the idea of carnivalesque in communication as she argues that it is found in corporate communication. Steele states "that ritualized sales meetings, annual employee picnics, retirement roasts and similar corporate events fit the category of carnival." Carnival cannot help but be linked to communication and culture as Steele points out that "in addition to qualities of inversion, ambivalence, and excess, carnival's themes typically include a fascination with the body, particularly its little-glorified or 'lower strata' parts, and dichotomies between 'high' or 'low'." The high and low binary is particularly relevant in communication as certain verbiage is considered high, while slang is considered low. Moreover, much of popular communication including television shows, books, and movies fall into high and low brow categories. This is particularly prevalent in Bakhtin's native Russia, where postmodernist writers such as Boris Akunin have worked to change low brow communication forms (such as the mystery novel) into higher literary works of art by making constant references to one of Bakhtin's favorite subjects, Dostoyevsky.

== Bibliography ==
- Bakhtin, M.M. (1929), Problems of Dostoevsky's Art (in Russian), Leningrad: Priboj.
- Bakhtin, M.M. (1963), Problems of Dostoevsky's Poetics (in Russian), Moscow: Khudozhestvennaja literatura.
- Bakhtin, M.M. (1971) [1965], Rabelais and His World, translated by Hélène Iswolsky., Cambridge, MA: MIT Press, ISBN 9780262520249.
- Bakhtin, M.M. (1975), Questions of Literature and Aesthetics (in Russian), Moscow: Progress.
- Bakhtin, M.M. (1979), Aesthetics of Verbal Art (in Russian), Moscow: Iskusstvo.
- Bakhtin, M.M. (1981), Michael Holquist. (ed.), The Dialogic Imagination: Four Essays by M.M. Bakhtin, translated by Caryl Emerson and Michael Holquist., Austin, TX / London: University of Texas Press, ISBN 9780292715349.
- Bakhtin, M.M. (1984), Caryl Emerson (ed.), Problems of Dostoevsky's Poetics, translated by Caryl Emerson, Minneapolis: University of Minnesota Press.
- Bakhtin, M.M. (1987), Emerson, Caryl; Holquist, Michael (eds.), Speech Genres and Other Late Essays, translated by McGee, Vern W., Austin, TX: University of Texas Press, ISBN 9780292775602.
- Bakhtin, M.M. (1990), Holquist, Michael; Liapunov, Vadim (eds.), Art and Answerability, translated by Liapunov, Vadim; Brostrom, Kenneth, Austin, TX: University of Texas Press, ISBN 9780292704121 [written 1919–1924, published 1974–1979].
- Bakhtin, M.M. (1993), Vadim Liapunov; Michael Holquist (eds.), Toward a Philosophy of the Act, translated by Liapunov, Vadim, Austin: University of Texas Press, ISBN 9780292708051.
- Bakhtin, M.M. (1996–2012), Collected Writings (in Russian), Moscow: Russkie slovari, 6 vols.
- Bakhtin, M.M.; Duvakin, V.D.; Bocharov, S.G. (2002), M.M. Bakhtin: Conversations with V.D. Duvakin (in Russian), Soglasie.
- Bakhtin, M.M. (2004), "Dialogic Origin and Dialogic Pedagogy of Grammar: Stylistics in Teaching Russian Language in Secondary School", Journal of Russian and East European Psychology, 42 (6), translated by Lydia Razran Stone: 12–49, doi:10.1080/10610405.2004.11059233.
- Bakhtin, M.M. (2014), "Bakhtin on Shakespeare: Excerpt from 'Additions and Changes to Rabelais'", PMLA, 129 (3), translated by Sergeiy Sandler: 522–537, doi:10.1632/pmla.2014.129.3.522, JSTOR 24769492.
- Bakhtin, Mikhail (2019), Gratchev, Slav; Marinova, Margarita (eds.), Mikhail Bakhtin: The Duvakin Interviews, 1973, Bucknell University Press, ISBN 9781684480913.
- Bakhtin, M. M. (2025) [1965], Rabelais and his world, translated by Sandler, Sergeiy, Cambridge, MA: MIT Press, ISBN 9780262553131.

== See also ==
- Lev Vygotsky
- Menippean satire
- Pavel Medvedev
