= The Dialogic Imagination =

Book by Mikhail Bakhtin

The Dialogic Imagination (full title: The Dialogic Imagination: Four Essays by M. M. Bakhtin) is a book on the nature and development of novelistic prose, comprising four essays by the twentieth century Russian philosopher and literary theorist Mikhail Bakhtin. It was edited and translated into English by Michael Holquist and Caryl Emerson, who gave the work its English title.

Holquist and Emerson chose the essays from a collection of six essays by Bakhtin published in Moscow under the title Вопросы литературы и эстетики (Voprosy literatury i ėstetiki; Problems of Literature and Aesthetics). According to Holquist, the unifying theme of the essays is "the novel and its relation to language." The title refers to the central place of the concept of dialogue in Bakhtin's theory of the novel. The novel, unlike other literary forms, embraces heterogeneity in discourse and meaning: it re-creates a reality that is based on the interactions of a variety of subjective consciousnesses and ways of thinking and speaking about the world. In this sense novelistic discourse undermines absolute or authoritative (monologic) language, which is revealed to be merely one form of ideological expression operating within an essentially intersubjective medium. Language, in Bakhtin's view, is inherently dialogic, and the novel is the literary genre that has the greatest capacity to artistically represent this reality. According to John Sturrock, for Bakhtin the novel is "the most complete and the most democratic of genres, coming as close as it is possible for an artform to come to capturing the multiplicity, richness and zest of life itself."

== The four essays ==
Problems of Literature and Aesthetics was published in 1975 and The Dialogic Imagination in 1981, but Bakhtin actually wrote the essays forty years earlier. Holquist and Emerson arranged the essays according to their relative complexity, from the simplest to the most difficult, rather than chronologically. The essays are: "Epic and Novel" (1941); "From the Prehistory of Novelistic Discourse" (1940); "Forms of Time and of the Chronotope in the Novel" (1937–38); "Discourse in the Novel" (1934). The editors provide an introduction placing the essays within the context of Bakhtin's conception of language, and a glossary explaining his extensive and idiosyncratic technical vocabulary.

=== Epic and Novel ===
In this essay, Bakhtin identifies the distinguishing features of the novel as a genre by contrasting it with the epic. The essential difference lies in what Emerson, following Lukacs, refers to as "the gap between self and society". The epic expresses a unity of worldview that does not permit the development of an alienated interiority of the soul, or indeed any form of behaviour, interpretation or language that is at variance with it. The epic takes place in an absolute past and speaks in an absolute language; the novel expresses the non-coincidence between hero and environment, and in doing so becomes an artistic medium for the genuinely new (novel) – in dialogue, temporal development and consciousness. Unlike the epic, the novel happily incorporates other genres, and thrives on a diversity of worldviews and ways of speaking about the world.

=== From the Prehistory of Novelistic Discourse ===
Bakhtin analyses a number of texts from the distant past in terms of their embodiment of a force that he calls 'novelness', which is indicated in them more as a potential than as a realized genre. The primary constituents of this force are polyglossia and parody (or 'laughter'). Polyglossia refers to "the simultaneous presence of two or more national languages interacting within a single cultural system". This interaction effectively destroys the myth of singularity and inherent unity assumed by each language/cultural system, and creates a new cultural paradigm in which each can be seen in the light of the other. Parody hints at the absurdity of absolute or 'serious' language by presenting a humorous image of the genre or discourse that is its object. Parodic forms were common in ancient, medieval and renaissance times, and Bakhtin contends that there were no serious genres that did not have some form of parodic 'double'.

=== Forms of Time and of the Chronotope in the Novel ===
Covering a range of novelistic prototypes, beginning with the ancient Greek Romance and proceeding historically to the work of Rabelais, Bakhtin analyzes the ways in which configurations of time and space (Chronotopes) have been represented in narrative literature. In undertaking such an analysis, Bakhtin is again concerned with demonstrating the capacity of novelistic prose to present a more profound image of people, actions, events, history and society.

=== Discourse in the Novel ===
In the final essay, Bakhtin provides a model for a history of discourse and introduces the concept of heteroglossia. Heteroglossia is the reflection in language of varying ways of evaluating, conceptualizing and experiencing the world. It is the convergence in language or speech of "specific points of view on the world, forms for conceptualizing the world in words, specific world views, each characterized by its own objects, meanings and values." Language is intrinsically shaped, historically and in each individual speech act, by qualities such as perspective, evaluation, and ideological positioning, and in this fundamental sense is not amenable to the science of linguistics. Every word is inextricably bound to the context in which it exists, the intention of the speaker, and the intentions of other speakers of the same word, and cannot be reduced to an abstraction. According to Bakhtin:

As a living, socio-ideological concrete thing, as heteroglot opinion, language, for the individual consciousness, lies on the borderline between oneself and the other. The word in language is half someone else’s. It becomes one’s “own” only when the speaker populates it with his own intentions, his own accent, when he appropriates the word, adapting it to his own semantic and expressive intention. Prior to this moment of appropriation, the word does not exist in a neutral and impersonal language (it is not, after all, out of the dictionary that a speaker gets his words!), but rather it exists in other people's mouths, in other people's contexts, serving other people's intentions… Language is not a neutral medium that passes freely and easily into the private property of the speaker’s intentions; it is populated –overpopulated– with the intentions of others. Expropriating it, forcing it to submit to one’s own intentions and accents, is a difficult and complicated process.

The novel as a genre and the novelist as an artist are uniquely suited to portraying the heteroglot reality of language and social discourse. Any form or use of language can enter into the world of the novel, and the novelist must be adept at harnessing this multiplicity for "the orchestration of his themes and for the refracted expression of his intentions and values." Language is relativised in the novel and is dialogic in nature: monologic language, language with pretensions to a unitary authority, becomes suspect, since it implies the exclusion of other voices, calcifying discourse and effacing the heteroglot reality that is the essence of living social discourse. In Bakhtin's terminology, the novel has the potential to undermine the centripetal (homogenising, hierarchising) forces and tendencies of language and culture through its exploitation of centrifugal (decrowning, decentering, dispersing) forces.

== See also ==
- Dialogue (Bakhtin)
