= Heteroglossia =

Coexistence of multiple points of view within a language

Heteroglossia is the coexistence of distinct linguistic varieties, styles of discourse, or points of view within a single language (in Greek: hetero- "different" and glōssa "tongue, language"). The term translates the Russian разноречие [raznorechie: literally, "varied-speechedness"], which was introduced by the Russian literary theorist Mikhail Bakhtin in his 1934 paper Слово в романе [Slovo v romane], published in English as "Discourse in the Novel." The essay was published in English in the book The Dialogic Imagination: Four Essays by M. M. Bakhtin, translated and edited by Michael Holquist and Caryl Emerson.

Heteroglossia is the presence in language of a variety of "points of view on the world, forms for conceptualizing the world in words, specific world views, each characterized by its own objects, meanings and values." For Bakhtin, this diversity of "languages" within a single language brings into question the basic assumptions of system-based linguistics. Every word uttered, in any specific time or place, is a function of a complex convergence of forces and conditions that are unique to that time and place. Heteroglossia is thus "the base condition governing the operation of meaning in any utterance" and that which always guarantees "the primacy of context over text." It is an attempt to conceptualize the reality of living discourse, where there is always a tension between centralizing and decentralizing forces. According to Bakhtin, linguistics—to the extent that it operates on the presumption that language is a system—inevitably suppresses the fundamentally heteroglot nature of language as it is lived and experienced by human beings in their day to day realities.

== Languages as points of view ==
Any language, in Bakhtin's view, stratifies into many voices: "social dialects, characteristic group behaviour, professional jargons, generic languages, languages of generations and age groups, tendentious languages, languages of the authorities, of various circles and of passing fashions". This diversity of voice is, Bakhtin asserts, the defining characteristic of the novel as a genre. When heteroglossia is incorporated into the novel, it is "another's speech in another's language, serving to express authorial intentions but in a refracted way".

Bakhtin proposes that these stratifications of language represent distinct points of view on the world, characterized by their own meanings and values. In this view, language is "shot through with intentions and accents", and thus there are no neutral words. Even the most unremarkable statement possesses a taste, whether of a profession, a party, a generation, a place or a time. To Bakhtin, words do not exist until they are spoken, and in that moment they are imprinted with the signature of the speaker.

Bakhtin identifies the act of speech, or of writing, as a literary-verbal performance, one that requires speakers or authors to take a position, even if only by choosing the dialect in which they will speak. Separate languages are often identified with separate circumstances. The prose writer, Bakhtin argues, must welcome and incorporate these many languages into his work.

== Heteroglossia and linguistics ==
Bakhtin rejects the idea that language is a system of abstract norms and that the utterance is a mere instantiation of the system of language. In "Discourse in the Novel", he criticizes linguistics, poetics, and stylistics for misunderstanding the fact that different people and groups speak differently. According to Bakhtin, language, like the psyche and everything else in culture, is never a finished, ordered system: it is a work in progress, always ongoing, never complete. There is a constant tension in language between the attempt to impose order and the fact that life itself is essentially chaotic. Real life is complex, spontaneous, subjective, impulsive, not pre-determined, full of disorder, the unexpected, the unknown, the undefined, the indefinable, and it refuses to be (or rather it cannot be) contained in a system that imagines and imposes an order of things. These dis-ordering forces in language, which Bakhtin refers to as centrifugal, are not unified or somehow conscious of themselves as forces of opposition. Centrifugal forces are essentially disparate and disunified: attempts to unify them are an ordering project, and thus not centrifugal.

The force in culture that strives for unity and order Bakhtin refers to as centripetal. It is reflected in language in the standardisation of national languages, in rules of grammar, the writing of dictionaries, and in the science of linguistics. Bakhtin does not object to such an effort, but he insists that it must be recognized as an imposition of order on something that fundamentally lacks it: "A unitary language is not something given [дан, dan] but is always in essence posited [задан, zadan]". Disciplines like philology, linguistics, stylistics and poetics take something that is an ideal, something that is posited in a struggle for social unity, and mistake it for something that really exists. The posited system is reified and an explanatory force is arbitrarily bestowed upon it, effectively denying the existence of the living, disordered, heteroglot reality upon which it is imposed. The attempt to systematize language—to objectify, idealize and abstract it into a static set of rules and conventions for signification—is falsely posited as a descriptive or scientific activity, when in reality it is a form of socio-political activism.

According to Bakhtin, language is always a multiplicity of languages. This is not merely a matter of dialectology, but of the many different ways of speaking, which are reflections of the diversity of social experience, of differing ways of conceptualizing and evaluating. Linguistics fails to appreciate the importance of this multiplicity in the reality of language as it is actually lived and practiced. It is not merely a matter of different vocabularies, but a complex of experiences, shared evaluations, ideas, perspectives and attitudes that are "knitted together" (срастаться, srastat'sya) in an organic process: a coalescence of separate entities that have themselves been formed by such a process, which is to say by a living process of adaptation and growth. Different languages reflect different attitudes and worldviews. Linguistic features are not fixed and definitive: they are a consequence—"traces", "crystallizations", or "sclerotic deposits"―of these attitudes and worldviews, which are themselves the consequence of particular forms of active participation in life and culture. Such participation is a creative response to the circumstances and demands of daily life: "discourse lives, as it were, beyond itself, in a living impulse (направленность, napravlennost') toward the object; if we wholly detach ourselves from this impulse all we have left is the naked corpse of the word, from which we can learn nothing at all about the social situation or the fate of a given word in life."

Bakhtin points to the astonishing variety and variability of languages: there are languages within languages, languages overlapping other languages, languages of small social groups, of large social groups, enduring languages, transitory languages. Any separately identified social group might have its own language, also each year and even each "day". All these diverse groups are more or less "capable of attracting language's words and forms into their orbit by means of their own characteristic intentions and accents, and in so doing to a certain extent alienating these words and forms from other tendencies, parties, artistic works and persons". There are no "neutral" words, no words that belong to no-one. Thus linguistics, as an abstracting process, can never adequately address the reality of heteroglossia.

== Dialogized Heteroglossia ==
Each individual participates in multiple languages, each with its own views and evaluations. Dialogized heteroglossia refers to the relations and interactions between these languages within an individual speaker. Bakhtin gives the example of an illiterate peasant, who speaks Church Slavonic to God, speaks to his family in their own peculiar dialect, sings songs in yet a third, and attempts to emulate officious high-class dialect when he dictates petitions to the local government. Theoretically, the peasant may use each of these languages at the appropriate time, prompted by context, mechanically, without ever questioning their adequacy to the task for which he has acquired them. But languages combined within an individual (or within a social unit of any size), do not exist merely as separate entities, neatly compartmentalised alongside each other, never interacting. A point of view contained in one language is capable of observing and interpreting another from the outside, and vice versa. Thus the languages "interanimate" one another as they enter into dialogue. Any sort of unitary significance or monologic value system assumed by a discrete language is irrevocably undermined by the presence of another way of speaking and interpreting.

According to Bakhtin, such a dialogizing process is always going on in language. Linguistic change is not about change, reaction, readjustment and balance in any systemic sense: it is inherently chaotic and unpredictable, produced by the unforeseeable events of everyday activity. There are no abstract forces at work, there are living people responding to the complex realities of their daily lives. People do not learn their native language from dictionaries, but from the series of exchanges with others in which they participate. Thus the individual encounters the language she assimilates as something that is already dialogized and evaluated. In the assimilation of new words and syntactic forms, which are then employed and deployed for one's own purposes, there is no thought of abstracting away their accents and addressivity in order to systematize them. Such words and forms operate in the individual as they operate in their social milieu: as living impulses.

== The hybrid utterance ==
The hybrid utterance, as defined by Bakhtin, is a passage that employs only a single speaker—the author, for example— but uses different kinds of speech. The juxtaposition of the different speeches brings with it a contradiction and conflict in belief systems.

In examination of the English comic novel, particularly the works of Charles Dickens, Bakhtin identifies examples of his argument. Dickens parodies both the 'common tongue' and the language of Parliament or high-class banquets, using concealed languages to create humor. In one passage, Dickens shifts from his authorial narrative voice into a formalized, almost epic tone while describing the work of an unremarkable bureaucrat; his intent is to parody the self-importance and vainglory of the bureaucrat's position. The use of concealed speech, without formal markers of a speaker change, is what allows the parody to work. It is, in Bakhtin's parlance, a hybrid utterance. In this instance the conflict is between the factual narrative and the biting hyperbole of the new, epic/formalistic tone.

Bakhtin goes on to discuss the interconnectedness of conversation. Even a simple dialogue, in his view, is full of quotations and references, often to a general "everyone says" or "I heard that.." Opinion and information are transmitted by way of reference to an indefinite, general source. By way of these references, humans selectively assimilate the discourse of others and make it their own.

Bakhtin identifies a specific type of discourse, the "authoritative discourse," which demands to be assimilated by the reader or listener; examples might be religious dogma, or scientific theory, or a popular book. This type of discourse is viewed as past, finished, hierarchically superior, and therefore demands "unconditional allegiance" rather than accepting interpretation. Because of this, Bakhtin states that authoritative discourse plays an insignificant role in the novel. Because it is not open to interpretation, it cannot enter into hybrid utterance.

Bakhtin concludes by arguing that the role of the novel is to draw the authoritative into question, and to allow what was once considered certain to be debated and open to interpretation. In effect, novels not only function through heteroglossia, but must promote it; to do otherwise is an artistic failure.

== See also ==
- The Dialogic Imagination
- Dialogue (Bakhtin)
- Polyphony (literature)
- Register (sociolinguistics)
- Variation (linguistics)
