= Menippean satire =

Literary genre

The genre of Menippean satire is a form of satire, usually in prose, that is characterized by attacking mental attitudes rather than specific individuals or entities. It has been broadly described as a mixture of allegory, picaresque narrative, and satirical commentary. Other features found in Menippean satire are different forms of parody and mythological burlesque, a critique of the myths inherited from traditional culture, a rhapsodic nature, a fragmented narrative, the combination of many different targets, and the rapid moving between styles and points of view.

The term is used by classical grammarians and by philologists mostly to refer to satires in prose (cf. the verse Satires of Juvenal and his imitators). Social types attacked and ridiculed by Menippean satires include "pedants, bigots, cranks, parvenus, virtuosi, enthusiasts, rapacious and incompetent professional men of all kinds", although they are addressed in terms of "their occupational approach to life as distinct from their social behavior ... as mouthpieces of the idea they represent". Characterization in Menippean satire is more stylized than naturalistic, and presents people as an embodiment of the ideas they represent. The term 'Menippean satire' distinguishes it from the earlier satire pioneered by Aristophanes, which was based on personal attacks.

The writers of such satires include (among others) Antisthenes, Heraclides Ponticus, Bion of Borysthenes, the eponymous polemicist Menippus, Marcus Terentius Varro, Lucian, Seneca the Younger, Petronius, Apuleius, Gaius Lucilius, Horace, Boethius, and Julian the Apostate. Elements of Menippean satire are also found in the humor of the Gospels.

== Origins ==
The form is named after the third-century-BC Syro-Phoenician Cynic parodist and polemicist Menippus. His works, now lost, influenced the works of Lucian (2nd century AD) and Marcus Terentius Varro (116–27 BC), the latter being the first to identify the genre by referring to his own satires as saturae menippeae; such satires are sometimes also termed Varronian satire. According to Mikhail Bakhtin, the genre itself was in existence prior to Menippus, with authors such as Antisthenes (c. 446 – c. 366 BC), Heraclides Ponticus (c. 390 BC – c. 310 BC) and Bion of Borysthenes (c. 325 – c. 250 BC).

== Classical tradition ==
Varro's own 150 books of Menippean satires survive only through quotations. The genre continued with Seneca the Younger, whose Apocolocyntosis, or "Pumpkinification", is the only near-complete classical Menippean satire to survive. It consists of an irreverent parody of the deification of Emperor Claudius. The Menippean tradition is also evident in Petronius' Satyricon, especially in the banquet scene "Cena Trimalchionis", which combines epic form, tragedy, and philosophy with verse and prose. Both Satyricon and Apuleius' Metamorphoses (The Golden Ass), are Menippea "extended to the limits of the novel". The most complete picture of the genre in ancient times is to be found in the satires of Lucian.

The influence of Menippean satire can be found in ancient Greek novels, in the Roman satires of Gaius Lucilius and Horace, and in early Christian literature, including the Gospels. Later examples include The Consolation of Philosophy by Boethius and The Caesars of Julian the Apostate.

== Characteristics ==
Bakhtin identifies a number of basic characteristics that distinguish Menippean satire from comparable genres in antiquity:

- There is a significantly heightened comic element, although there are exceptions (for example in Boethius).
- There is an extraordinary freedom of plot and philosophical invention. It is not bound by the orthodoxies of legend, or by the need for historical or everyday realism, even when its central characters are based on legendary or historical figures. It freely operates in the realm of "the fantastic".
- The unrestrained use of the fantastic is internally motivated by a philosophical objective: a philosophical idea, embodied in a seeker of truth, is tested in extraordinary situations.
- Fantastic and mystical elements are combined with a crude slum naturalism: the 'testing of the idea' never avoids the degenerate or grotesque side of earthly existence. The man of the idea encounters "worldly evil, depravity, baseness and vulgarity in their most extreme expression".
- The ideas being tested are always of an "ultimate" nature. Merely intellectual or academic problems or arguments had no place: the whole man and his whole life are at stake in the process of the testing of his idea. Everywhere there is the "stripped down pro et contra of life's ultimate questions".
- A three-planed construction—Earth, Olympus and the netherworld—is apparent. Action and dialogue frequently take place on the "threshold" between the planes.
- An experimental fantasticality in narrative point of view appears, for example the "view from above" (kataskopia).
- An experimentation with psychopathological states of mind – madness, split personality, unrestrained daydreaming, weird dreams, extreme passions, suicides etc. Such phenomena function in the Menippea to destabilize the unity of an individual and his fate – a unity that is always assumed in other genres such as the epic. The person discovers other possibilities than those apparently preordained in himself and his life: "he loses his finalized quality and ceases to mean only one thing; he ceases to coincide with himself". This non-finalization and non-coincidence is facilitated by a rudimentary form of "dialogic relationship to one's own self".
- Breaches of conventional behaviour and disruptions to the customary course of events are characteristic of the Menippea. Scandals and eccentricities have the same function in 'the world' that mental disorders have in 'the individual' – they shatter the fragile unity and stability of the established order and the 'normal', expected course of events. The inappropriate, cynical word that unmasks a false idol or an empty social convention is similarly characteristic.
- Sharp contrasts, abrupt transitions, oxymoronic combinations, counterintuitive comparisons and unexpected meetings between unrelated things are essential to the Menippea. Opposites are brought together, or united in a single character – the noble criminal, the virtuous courtesan, the emperor who becomes a slave.
- There is often an element of social utopia, usually in the form of a dream or journey to an unknown land.
- Widespread use of inserted genres such as novellas, letters, speeches, diatribes, soliloquys, symposia, and poetry, frequently of a parodic nature.
- A sharp satirical focus on a wide variety of contemporary ideas and issues.

Despite the apparent heterogeneity of these characteristics, Bakhtin emphasizes the "organic unity" and the "internal integrity" of the genre. He argues that Menippean satire is the best expression and the truest reflection of the social-philosophical tendencies of the epoch in which it flowered. This was the epoch of the decline of national legend, the disintegration of associated ethical norms, and the concomitant explosion of new religious and philosophical schools vying with each other over "ultimate questions". The "epic and tragic wholeness of a man and his fate" lost its power as a social and literary ideal, and consequently social 'positions' became devalued, transformed into 'roles' played out in a theatre of the absurd. Bakhtin argues that the generic integrity of Menippean satire in its expression of a decentred reality is a quality that has enabled it to exercise an immense influence over the development of European novelistic prose.

According to Bakhtin, the cultural force that underpins the integrity and unity of Menippean satire as a genre, despite its extreme variability and the heterogeneity of its elements, is carnival. The genre epitomises the transposition of the "carnival sense of the world" into the language and forms of literature, a process Bakhtin refers to as Carnivalisation. Carnival as a social event is "syncretic pageantry of a ritualistic sort": its essential elements were common to a great diversity of times and places, and over time became deeply rooted in the individual and collective psyche. These elements revolved around the suspension of the laws, prohibitions and restrictions that governed the structure of ordinary life, and the acceptance and even celebration of everything that was hidden or repressed by that structure. The apparently heterogeneous characteristics of Menippean satire can, in essence, be traced back to the "concretely sensuous forms" worked out in the carnival tradition and the unified "carnival sense of the world" that grew out of them. Yet Bakhtin also makes it clear that when applied to modern literature, the term refers more to "the essence of a genre" than to any formal genre itself.

== Later examples ==
In a series of articles, Edward Milowicki and Robert Rawdon Wilson, building upon Bakhtin's theory, have argued that Menippean is not a period-specific term, as many classicists have claimed, but a term for discursive analysis that instructively applies to many kinds of writing from many historical periods including the modern. As a type of discourse, “Menippean” signifies a mixed, often discontinuous way of writing that draws upon distinct, multiple traditions. It is normally highly intellectual and typically embodies an idea, an ideology or a mind-set in the figure of a grotesque, even disgusting, comic character.

The form was revived during the Renaissance by Erasmus, Burton, and Laurence Sterne, while 19th-century examples include the John Buncle of Thomas Amory and The Doctor of Robert Southey. The 20th century saw renewed critical interest in the form, with Menippean satire significantly influencing postmodern literature. Among the works that contemporary scholars have identified as growing out of the Menippean tradition are:

- Erasmus, In Praise of Folly (1509)
- François Rabelais, Gargantua and Pantagruel (1564)
- John Barclay, Euphormionis Satyricon (1605)
- Joseph Hall, Mundus Alter et Idem (1605)
- Miguel Cervantes, Novelas ejemplares (1612)
- Robert Burton, The Anatomy of Melancholy (1621)
- Jonathan Swift, A Tale of a Tub and Gulliver's Travels (1726)
- Voltaire, Candide (1759)
- William Blake, The Marriage of Heaven and Hell (1794)
- Thomas Love Peacock, Nightmare Abbey (1818)
- Thomas Carlyle, Sartor Resartus (1836)
- Nikolai Gogol, Dead Souls (1842)
- Lewis Carroll, Alice in Wonderland (1865)
- Fyodor Dostoevsky, Bobok (1873)
- Fyodor Dostoevsky, The Dream of a Ridiculous Man (1877)
- Aldous Huxley, Point Counter Point (1928)
- James Joyce, Finnegans Wake (1939)
- Flann O'Brien, At Swim-Two-Birds (1939) and The Third Policeman (1939)
- Mikhail Bulgakov, The Master and Margarita (1967)
- Martin Amis, Dead Babies (1975)
- Terry Gilliam, Brazil (1985)
- Dave Eggers, The Circle (2013)

According to P. Adams Sitney in "Visionary Film", Mennipea became the dominant new genre in avant-garde cinema at the turn of the century. Filmmakers he cited include Yvonne Rainer, Sidney Peterson, Michael Snow, and Hollis Frampton.

For Bakhtin, Menippean satire as a genre reached its summit in the modern era in the novels and short stories of Dostoevsky. He argues that all the characteristics of the ancient Menippea are present in Dostoevsky but in a highly developed and more complex form. This was not because Dostoevsky intentionally adopted and expanded it as a form: his writing was not in any sense a stylization of the ancient genre. Rather it was a creative renewal based in an instinctive recognition of its potential as a form through which to express the philosophical, spiritual and ideological ferment of his time. It could be said that "it was not Dostoevsky's subjective memory, but the objective memory of the very genre in which he worked, that preserved the peculiar features of the ancient menippea." The generic features of Menippean satire were the ground on which Dostoevsky was able to build a new literary genre, which Bakhtin calls Polyphony.

== Frye's definition ==
Critic Northrop Frye said that Menippean satire moves rapidly between styles and points of view. Such satires deal less with human characters than with the single-minded mental attitudes, or "humours", that they represent: the pedant, the braggart, the bigot, the miser, the quack, the seducer, etc. Frye observed,

The novelist sees evil and folly as social diseases, but the Menippean satirist sees them as diseases of the intellect […]

He illustrated this distinction by positing Squire Western (from Tom Jones) as a character rooted in novelistic realism, but the tutors Thwackum and Square as figures of Menippean satire.

Frye found the term Menippean satire to be "cumbersome and in modern terms rather misleading", and proposed as replacement the term anatomy (taken from Burton's Anatomy of Melancholy). In his theory of prose fiction it occupies the fourth place with the novel, romance and confession.

== Weinbrot’s definition ==
In Menippean Satire Reconsidered: From Antiquity to the Eighteenth Century, Howard D. Weinbrot provides a definition of Menippean satire as follows:

My notion of Menippean satire is of a kind of satire that uses at least two different languages, genres, tones, or cultural or historical periods to combat a false and threatening orthodoxy.

Jean-François Vallée from the Collège de Maisonneuve, Université de Montréal, reviewed Weinbrot's book, stating:

The most striking aspect of W.'s definition resides, for better or for worse, in its identification of a "common denominator" supposedly typical of every true Menippean satire: it should be a "variously multipronged text that variously confronts a grave and illicit threat to a normative belief system". Hence, "[i]t is a genre for serious people who see serious trouble and want to do something about it."

== See also ==
- Carnivalesque
- Satire Ménippée (1594) – a satirical work in France during the Wars of Religion
