= Voskresenie =

The Voskresenie (Resurrection or Sunday) was a left-leaning, quasi-Masonic sect, which existed in Petrograd between 1918 and 1928. The group, which consisted of philosophers, professionals, and members of the Religious Philosophical Society, sought to support the Bolsheviks' economic policy but oppose their atheistic culture, and in so doing to 'renew humanity and the construction of communism' (as seen in Brandist 2002, p. 28).

== First gathering ==
In December 1917, several employees of the Imperial Public Library gathered at the flat of philosopher Georgy Fedotov to discuss the recent October Revolution and the manner with which the intelligentsia should respond to the social revolution. Continuing in traditions of the masonic Religious-Philosophic Society, which had been run by their mentors - Dmitry Merezhkovsky and his wife Zinaida Gippius - the group critically accepted the revolution, but urged that people be free to express their spiritual beliefs.

== Leadership and themes ==
By March 1918, the circle included at least 18 formally recognised members. The leaders were Fedorov and Alexander Meyer, who argued for the union (smychka) of Christianity and social revolution (ibid.). The majority of participants of the circle were skeptical about the official position of the Russian Orthodox Church, believing that free development of Christian ideas within the Church was impossible. Meetings were held in the apartments of the Free Philosophical Association, though after they were closed in 1923, the meetings were held in the flats of K.A. Polovtsova (7 Maly Avenue of Petrogradskaya Side) and P.F. Smotritsky (18 Geslerovsky Lane); in 1917-28, no fewer than 150 people attended these meetings.

The main discussion themes included revolution and power, religion, and society. The painter Kuzma Petrov-Vodkin occasionally visited the circle's meetings, as did philologists M.M Bakhtin and Lev Pumpyansky, although Bakhtin and Pumpyansky appeared not to have any formal connection to the group (Hirschkop 1999: p. 168). In 1918, members of the circle issued a periodical, Free Voices, although it proved to be short lived, it was published only twice, having been discontinued after opposition from Merezhkovsky.

== The name Voskresenie ==
By the end of 1919, the group officially assumed the name of Voskresenie, which is the Russian word both for "Sunday" and for "Resurrection". The name reflected their hopes to see the social revolution resurrect spiritual freedoms. By this time eleven people formed the core of Voskresenie, and they organized the fraternity "Christ and Freedom", which secretly convened on Tuesdays and discussed the possibility of facilitating the merger of social revolution and Christianity. The fraternity was disbanded in 1923, on account of disagreements between its members.

== Disbanded ==
After Fedorov emigrated two years later, the society came to be dominated by Meyer, who used his charismatic aura and rhetorical skill to turn the circle into a sort of religious sect or masonic lodge. On 8 December 1928, when the society was about to mark its 10th anniversary, Meyer, Bakhtin, and (about 100) other individuals associated with Voskresenie were apprehended by the OGPU (Hirschkop 1999: p. 168). The subsequent trial resulted in the Voskresenie leaders being sentenced up to ten years in labour camps. Bakhtin was found guilty for his association with the circle and on 1929-07-22 he was sentenced to five years in Siberia. Approximately 70 people were sentenced by Decree of the Collegium of the Joint State Political Administration Board on 22 July 1929.
