= Polyglossia =

Presence of multiple languages/dialects in a community

Polyglossia (/ˌpɒlɪˈɡlɒsiə/) refers to the coexistence of multiple languages (or distinct varieties of the same language) in one society or area. The term implies a living interaction among multiple languages within a single cultural system, producing significant effects on that culture. The word was used in a number of anthropology journals in the 1970s referencing multilingual communities in Malaysia, Singapore and the Caucasus region.

== See also ==
- Diglossia
- Heteroglossia
