= Pavel Medvedev (scholar) =

Russian literary scholar (1892–1938)

Pavel Nikolaevich Medvedev (Russian: Павел Николаевич Медведев; 4 January 1892 [O.S. 23 December 1891] in Saint Petersburg – 17 July 1938 in Leningrad) was a Russian literary scholar. He was a professor, social activist, and friend of Mikhail Bakhtin, as well as of Boris Pasternak and Fyodor Sologub. Medvedev held several government posts in education and publishing after the 1917 revolution, publishing a great deal of his own writing on literary, sociological, and linguistic issues. Medvedev was arrested during the 1930s period of purges under the rule of Joseph Stalin, and "disappeared" shortly after his arrest. He was shot on 17 July 1938.

One of his works, The Formal Method in Literary Scholarship, was believed to be written by his "co-thinker" Bakhtin, using his name to escape censorship. This belief was raised during the 1970s in Russia but developed fully in Clark and Holquist's English biography of Bakhtin of 1984. Now, it is mostly believed that the work was written by Medvedev although influenced by Bakhtin's ideas.

== See also ==
- Mikhail Bakhtin
- Russian Formalism

== Bibliography ==
- Brandist, Craig, "The Bakhtin Circle", Internet Encyclopedia of Philosophy
- Brandist, Craig (2002), The Bakhtin Circle: Philosophy, Culture and Politics, Pluto Press, ISBN 9780745318110.
- Brandist, Craig; Shepherd, David; Tihanov, Galin (2004), "The Bakhtin Circle: a timeline", in Craig Brandist; David Shepherd; Galin Tihanov (eds.), The Bakhtin Circle. In the Master's Absence, Manchester University Press, pp. 251–275, ISBN 0-7190-6408-2.
- Medvedev, Iu. P. (2002), "An Encounter that was 'Intended to be'", Dialogism (5&6): 10–20.
- Medvedev, Iu. P.; Medvedeva, D. A. (2004), "The scholarly legacy of Pavel Medvedev in the light of his dialogue with Bakhtin", in Craig Brandist; David Shepherd; Galin Tihanov (eds.), The Bakhtin Circle. In the Master's Absence, Manchester University Press, pp. 24–43, ISBN 0-7190-6408-2.
- Medvedev, Yury P.; Medvedeva, Daria A., "Pavel Medvedev", in Dmitry Olshansky (ed.), Gallery of Russian Thinkers, translated by David Shepherd.
