= Polyphony (literature) =

Simultaneity of points of view and voices in a narrative

In literature, polyphony (Russian: полифония) is a feature of narrative, which includes a diversity of simultaneous points of view and voices. Caryl Emerson describes it as "a decentered authorial stance that grants validity to all voices". The concept was introduced by Mikhail Bakhtin, using a metaphor based on the musical term polyphony.

Bakhtin's primary example of polyphony was Fyodor Dostoevsky's prose. According to Bakhtin, the chief characteristic of Dostoevsky's novels is "a plurality of independent and unmerged voices and consciousnesses, a genuine polyphony of fully valid voices". His major characters are, "by the very nature of his creative design, not only objects of authorial discourse but also subjects of their own directly signifying discourse" (italics in the original).

Polyphony in literature is the consequence of a dialogic sense of truth in combination with the special authorial position that makes possible the realization of that sense on the page. The dialogic sense of truth, as it manifests in Dostoevsky, is a radically different way of understanding the world to that of the monologic. Dostoevsky's novels, according to Bakhtin, cannot be understood from within the monological tradition of western thought, a way of thinking about "truth" that has dominated religion, science, philosophy and literature for many centuries.

== Monologic and dialogic ==
In the monologic conception of truth, the "truth" or "falsehood" of a thought/assertion/proposition exists independently of the person who utters it. The monologic truth is a disembodied truth, or what Bakhtin calls "'no-man's' thoughts". The truth of a proposition is determined solely by reference to its accuracy or inaccuracy relative to its object. As such it doesn't matter who utters it: it is an abstraction that has the same relationship to truth regardless of who utters it. In philosophy and science, such 'separate thoughts' are generally formed with a view toward monologic systematisation of truth, which will be similarly "'no-man's'". Even if such a system is produced collectively, it is expressed and comprehended in the form of a single consciousness, potentially utterable by anyone, but always the same. The advocate of such a system "has only one principle of cognitive individualization: error. True judgments are not attached to a personality but correspond to some unified, systematically monologic context. Only error individualizes."

In contrast to this model of truth, Bakhtin postulates a truth that requires a multiplicity of consciousnesses, something that cannot be contained within a single consciousness; rather it comes into existence at the point of contact between diverse consciousnesses, and is intrinsically "full of event potential." Bakhtin's criticism of the monologic conception of truth is that it abstracts and effaces the "eventness" of the event – everything about it that makes it unique, unfinalizable and full of unrealized potential. In his conception, unknown and unforeseen possibilities arise out of the interaction of autonomous, unfinalized consciousnesses, and this is the true, lived nature of human existence. The "open-ended dialogue" is the verbal manifestation of this truth, and polyphony is its artistic representation in literary form.

== Voice-idea ==
In the polyphonic novel, the voices are "unmerged": they "cannot be contained within a single consciousness, as in monologism. Rather, their separateness is essential to the dialogue: even when they agree, they do so from different perspectives and different senses of the world." Dostoevsky thought not in thoughts as propositions with a quantifiable truth-value, but "in points of view, consciousnesses, voices." The carrier of truth "is not the assertion, but rather the integral point of view, the integral position of the personality." The idea has no substantive existence separate from the personality of a character: there is an "artistic fusion" of personality and idea that produces an irreducible spiritual orientation unique to that character, enabling them to "signify directly". The idea thus "lives" in the world: in Dostoevsky there is no disembodied ("'no-man's'") thought or idea. Bakhtin uses the term 'voice-idea' to designate this unity of idea and personality. In Dostoevsky's creative process the compositional structure of the novel forms spontaneously around the interactions of this multiplicity of voice-ideas. From this, no abstract, monological system can emerge, only "a concrete event made up of organized human orientations and voices."

== Position of the author ==
=== Monologic authorship ===
The monological novel is dominated by the author's ideology, which provides the unifying force for the work. The author retains "ultimate semantic authority" at all times. Truths apparently extrinsic to the author, belonging to a character for example, are "represented" truths: they are represented from within the author's ideological framework, invoked for their expediency relative to the author's overall purpose and plan. Ideas are either affirmed or repudiated. An affirmed idea, one that conforms to the unified worldview expressed through the work, "finds objective expression in a special accent of its own, in its special position within the work as a whole, in the very verbal and stylistic form of its utterance and in a whole series of other infinitely varied means for advancing a thought as a signifying, affirmed thought." If the idea falls outside of the author's worldview, it might be polemically repudiated, or it might be reduced to a negative 'attribute' of character, an expression of a finalized psychological or moral 'quality'. Its status is that of "socially typical or individually characteristic manifestations of thought." It is objectified by the author and always lacks the power to "signify directly" in and as itself. An idea's power to signify directly is impossible in a monologic world, where there is only affirmation or repudiation. Bakhtin argues that this is not merely a fact of an artistically created world, but is true of "the entire ideological culture of recent times".

=== Polyphonic authorship ===
In polyphonic writing, the author must relinquish monologic control over the work. If they do not, there is no possibility of realizing a dialogic sense of the world, where autonomous and unfinalized personalities interact on their own terms. It is only possible if the character is truly an other consciousness, with equal rights to signify, and not merely a 'created' character in the author's imposed reality. The author of the polyphonic novel confronts his characters as equals. He does not withdraw his own ideological position for the sake of an illusory objectivity: rather he places it directly among the equally signifying voice-ideas that are at variance with it, and provokes their confrontation with it and with the other voice-ideas. As his own voice has no more or less existential significance than any other voice, the author himself does not know in advance what the outcome of these confrontations will be. The interactions thus provoked are ripe with "event potential": conclusions are not foreordained, nothing truly comes to an end, and no character can be ultimately finalized from without. Thus the author's role in the polyphonic novel is twofold: "he creates a world where many disparate points of view enter into dialogue, and, in a quite distinct role, he himself participates in that dialogue. He is one of the interlocutors in the "great dialogue" that he himself has created."

== See also ==
- Dialogue (Bakhtin)
- The Dialogic Imagination

== Bibliography ==
- Bakhtin, M. M. (1984), Problems of Dostoevsky's Poetics. Ed. and trans. Caryl Emerson. Minneapolis: University of Minnesota Press.
- Bakhtin, M. M. (1981) The Dialogic Imagination: Four Essays. Ed. Michael Holquist. Trans. Caryl Emerson and Michael Holquist. Austin and London: University of Texas Press.
- Gary Saul Morson and Caryl Emerson (1990). Mikhail Bakhtin: Creation of a Prosaics. Stanford University Press.
