= Dialogue (Bakhtin) =

Bakhtin's theory of verbal interaction

The twentieth century Russian philosopher and literary theorist Mikhail Bakhtin wrote extensively on the concept of dialogue. Although Bakhtin's work took many different directions over the course of his life, dialogue always remained the "master key" to understanding his worldview. Bakhtin described the open-ended dialogue as "the single adequate form for verbally expressing authentic human life". In it "a person participates wholly and throughout his whole life: with his eyes, lips, hands, soul, spirit, with his whole body and deeds. He invests his entire self in discourse, and this discourse enters into the dialogic fabric of human life, into the world symposium."

== Bakhtin's understanding of dialogue ==
Dialogue is usually analyzed as some kind of interaction between two monads on the basis of a pre-conceived model. Bakhtin regards this conception as a consequence of 'theoretism'—the tendency, particularly in modern western thought, to understand events according to a pre-existing set of rules to which they conform or structure that they exhibit. This forgets that the rules or structures have been abstracted from the event, that the event is prior to the abstraction and that the event is always replete with a context, intimacy, immediacy, and significance to the participants that is effaced in the act of abstraction: "We cannot understand the world of events from within the theoretical world. One must start with the act itself, not with its theoretical transcription."

According to Bakhtin, dialogue lives on the boundaries between individuals: not in the sense of a meeting between isolated entities that exist "within" the boundaries (he argues that there is no "within"), but actually on the boundaries themselves. In Bakhtin's view, "no living word relates to its object in a singular way". Between the speaking subject, the word, and its object there exists "an elastic environment of other words about the same object... it is precisely in the process of living interaction with this specific environment that the word may be individualized and given stylistic shape." There is, effectively, no such thing as the monad. People are not closed units, they are open, loose, disordered, unfinalized: they are "extraterritorial" and "nonself-sufficient". "To be means to be for another, and through the other for oneself. A person has no sovereign internal territory, he is wholly and always on the boundary; looking inside himself, he looks into the eyes of another or with the eyes of another."

=== Outsideness ===
In his early writings Bakhtin used the concepts of outsideness and the surplus to elucidate the necessary conditions for dialogical interaction. In one's view of the other there is a surplus of spatio-temporal objectivity necessitated by the very fact of its externality: "In order to understand it is immensely important for the person who understands to be located outside the object of his or her creative understanding—in time, in space, in culture... Our real exterior can be seen and understood only by other people because they are located outside us in space and because they are others". Only the outside perspective, never the person themselves, can see "the clear blue sky against whose background their suffering external image takes on meaning". If the surplus is actively entered into the other's world, or the view from outside oneself is likewise engaged, the potential for new understanding comes into existence. In this sense dialogue has more profound implications than concepts such as 'empathy', or the social anthropologist's goal of understanding an alien culture from within, which involve trying to merge with the other's position. In such a situation nothing new can come into existence: there is only a duplication of the closed circle of what already exists.

=== Monologization ===
For dialogue to be possible there must be a plurality of positions. The dialogic is thus alien to any theory that would tend towards a monologisation of views—for example, the dialectical process, or any kind of dogmatism or relativism. Of dialectics as a form of monologization Bakhtin wrote: "Take a dialogue and remove the voices, remove the emotional and individualising intonations, carve out abstract concepts and judgements from living words and responses, cram everything into one abstract consciousness—and that's how you get dialectics." Both relativism and dogmatism "exclude all argumentation, all authentic dialogue, by making it either unnecessary (relativism) or impossible (dogmatism)." Dogmatism excludes any view or evidence that is at variance with it, making dialogue impossible, while at the (theoretically) opposite extreme, relativism also has a monologising effect, because if everything is relative and all truths are equally arbitrary, there is simply an infinity of monologizations, not a fruitful dialogue. Relativism precludes the potential for creativity and new understanding inherent in dialogue: each finds only the reflection of itself in its separateness. In the dialogic encounter "each retains its own unity and open totality, but they are mutually enriched."

According to Caryl Emerson, Bakhtin does not suggest that the creative potential inherent in the dialogic encounter is necessarily benign. There is no guarantee that an individual's investment of herself in dialogue will necessarily yield 'truth', 'beauty', 'consolation', 'salvation', or anything of that kind (ideal goals often claimed by monologic philosophies or methods). Engagement with the other brings concretization, liberation from solipsistic self-absorption, new realities and new choices, but these do not exclude 'negative' possibilities. The dialogic encounter, since it implies intimacy and vulnerability, can involve increased suffering and susceptibility to the cruelty or stupidity of the other. As Emerson expresses it: "By having a real other respond to me, I am spared one thing only: the worst cumulative effects of my own echo chamber of words."

=== Reification ===
"Reified (materializing, objectified) images", Bakhtin argues, "are profoundly inadequate for life and discourse... Every thought and every life merges in the open-ended dialogue. Also impermissible is any materialization of the word: its nature is dialogic." Semiotics and linguistics, like dialectics, reify the word: dialogue, instead of being a live event, a fruitful contact between human beings in a living, unfinalized context, becomes a sterile contact between abstracted things. When cultures and individuals accumulate habits and procedures (what Bakhtin calls the "sclerotic deposits" of earlier activity), and adopt forms based in "congealed" events from the past, the centripetal forces of culture will tend to codify them into a fixed set of rules. In the reifying sciences, this codification is mistaken for reality, undermining both creative potential and true insight into past activity. The uniqueness of an event, that which cannot be reduced to a generalization or abstraction, is in fact what makes responsibility, in any meaningful sense, possible: "activity and discourse are always evaluatively charged and context specific." In theoretical transcriptions of events, which are based in a model of "monads acting according to rules", the living impulse that actually gives rise to discourse is ignored. According to Bakhtin, "to study the word as such, ignoring the impulse that reaches out beyond it, is just as senseless as to study psychological experience outside the context of that real life toward which it was directed and by which it is determined."

== Dostoevsky ==
In the existing forms of 'knowledge', the open-ended dialogue of life is monologized—turned into a summary statement of its contents, but failing to recognize its unfinalizable nature. Bakhtin felt that the literary methods of Dostoevsky are far more adequate to the task of representing the reality of human interaction than scientific and philosophical approaches (including, and especially, psychology: Bakhtin emphasizes that Dostoevsky explicitly rejects the idea that he is a psychologist). Dostoevsky's characters are, by the very nature of his creative design, "not only objects of authorial discourse, but also subjects of their own directly signifying discourse." Multi-voicedness (Polyphony), is essential to Dostoevsky: the world of his novel is constructed upon it, such that it can be said that this multi-voicedness is itself the primary object of his work. Each character, and each implied voice in a character's internal dialogue, is an other consciousness that never becomes merely an object for the author or any other character or voice. "A character's word about himself and his world is just as fully weighted as the author's... It possesses extraordinary independence in the structure of the work; it sounds, as it were, alongside the author's word and combines both with it and with the full and equally valid voices of other characters."

In Problems of Dostoevsky's Poetics Bakhtin credits Dostoevsky with three major innovations that make possible the 'Great Dialogue' of the polyphonic novel. The first is unfinalizability: Dostoevsky's image of the human being is of a being that can not be wholly finalized by anything, even death. The second is the representation, through words, of the "self-developing idea, inseparable from personality." The third is the discovery and creative elaboration of dialogue "as a special form of interaction among autonomous and equally signifying consciousnesses."

== Discourse ==
Bakhtin argues that dialogic interactions are not reducible to forms that are analyzable by linguistic methods. While dialogic relations presuppose a language, they do not reside within the system of language and are impossible among the elements of a language. Instead they must be analyzed as discourse. The discursive word is never separate from a subject who utters it in address to another subject: the word must be embodied for it to have any dialogical status.

=== Single-voiced discourse ===
In his analysis Bakhtin distinguishes between single-voiced and double-voiced discourse. Single-voiced discourse always retains "ultimate semantic authority" for itself: it is not clouded by the presence of another word relative to its object.

- Direct, unmediated discourse "recognizes only itself and its object, to which it strives to be maximally adequate." It exhibits an aspiration to absolute language, as if there could be no better, or indeed other, way of giving verbal form to the object. A metalinguistic analysis might reveal its contingency, but it has no interest whatsoever in such an analysis, and presents itself as the final word.
- "Represented" or "objectified" discourse emanates from an author/narrator but is presented in the form of a character, ostensibly one that is typical of a particular type of individual or social group. To the character herself the discourse is direct and unmediated, but the reader is aware that there is an objectification going on by virtue of the fact that there is a narrator presenting it to an audience. Despite the apparent duality, Bakhtin treats it as another form of single-voiced discourse since there is no dialogical relationship between the author and the character. That is, the character only lives as the author's objectification, not as an autonomous voice capable of dispute, agreement etc.

=== Double-voiced discourse ===
In double-voiced discourse, another semantic intention, coincident with the speaker's own intention, is felt in the utterance. This second discourse (the "word of the other") can be either passive or active. When it is passive, the speaker is in control: the other's word is deliberately invoked for the speaker's own purposes. When it is active, the other's word does not submit to the speaker's will, and the speaker's discourse becomes fraught with the resistance, challenge and implied hostility of the second voice.

==== Passive double-voiced discourse ====
- Stylization is an example of what Bakhtin calls unidirectional double-voiced discourse. The style of an earlier speaker is adopted because it is deemed to be correct and suitable to the intent of the present speaker. Though the aim is unidirectional, stylization is double-voiced because the style is adopted specifically because the speaker is in a dialogical relationship of agreement with the other, and wishes this relationship to be known. The agreement implies the possibility of disagreement, and thus casts "a slight shadow of objectification" over what was originally direct/unmediated discourse.
- Parody is an example of varidirectional discourse. In contrast to stylization, it introduces "a semantic intention that is directly opposed to the original one." It signifies not only disagreement but active hostility: a desire to repudiate or diminish the other's discourse is evident. The parodist will indicate his own hostility by deliberately accentuating or exaggerating the objectionable aspects of the other's discourse. Related to parody is any kind of double-voiced use of someone else's words—in irony, mockery, ridicule, indignation, etc.
- Skaz (Russian: the spoken word, oral discourse) in the Russian formalist school meant a form of writing that gives the impression of being spontaneously spoken. It re-creates the idiosyncrasies of oral discourse, often in dialect. Bakhtin distinguished between skaz as a form of objectified discourse (i.e. single-voiced), to be found in writers like Turgenev and Leskov, and parodistic skaz (double-voiced), to be found in works like Gogol's The Overcoat and Dostoevsky's Poor Folk.

==== Active double-voiced discourse ====
- In hidden polemic, the speaker's discourse is apparently directed toward its own referential object, but it is structured so that it simultaneously attacks someone else's discourse on the same theme, about the same object. The other's discourse is not addressed openly, as in stylization or parody, but rather its existence is implied through the "polemical coloration" of the speaker's intonations and syntactic constructions: "One word acutely senses alongside it someone else's word speaking about the same object, and this awareness determines its structure."
- A rejoinder in an intense dialogue, while directing itself toward its object, simultaneously reacts to, answers and anticipates the interlocutor's word. A variety of subtle semantic changes to one's own and the other's word can be detected in a rejoinder of this kind.
- Hidden dialogue is when a speaker is directly addressing, anticipating, reacting to another's discourse, but that other voice is not actually present in the dialogue—the interlocutor's statements themselves are omitted, but they are implied in the speaker's responses to them.

According to Bakhtin, hidden dialogue and hidden polemic are of great importance in all Dostoevsky's works, beginning with his earliest work, Poor Folk. The character of Makar Devushkin constructs his epistolary discourse around the imagined, but not actually present, rejoinders of an other voice.

== See also ==
- The Dialogic Imagination
- Problems of Dostoevsky's Poetics
- Heteroglossia
