= Caryl Emerson =

American literary critic, slavist and translator

Caryl Emerson is an American literary critic, slavist and translator. She is best known for her books and scholarly commentaries on the Russian philosopher and literary theorist Mikhail Bakhtin. She has translated some of Bakhtin's most influential works, including Problems of Dostoevsky's Poetics and The Dialogic Imagination: Four Essays by M.M. Bakhtin. Emerson was Professor of Slavic Languages and Literatures and of Comparative Literature at Princeton University from 1988 until her retirement in 2015. From 1980 to 1987 she was a professor of Russian Literature at Cornell.

== Biography ==
Caryl Emerson grew up in Manhattan, Kansas, and Rochester, New York. Her father was a professor of theory and acoustics at the Eastman School of Music. Emerson completed her undergraduate studies at Cornell, majoring in Russian literature. She received her master's degrees in Russian studies and Russian language teaching from Harvard. She worked for some time as a secondary school teacher in New Jersey and then as a teacher of Russian area studies at Windham College in Vermont before completing a doctorate in comparative literature at the University of Texas.

At graduate school Emerson encountered the work of Mikhail Bakhtin, who at that time was largely unknown in both his native (Soviet) Russia and the West. As a professor at Cornell, Emerson became a leading figure in the dissemination and explication of Bakhtin's work. Her translation of Problems of Dostoevsky's Poetics in 1984 is still the only one used in English. The book is now considered a classic in Dostoevsky studies and literary theory, and has been influential in other disciplines such as philosophy and psychology. During her time at Princeton Emerson wrote two books about Bakhtin, Mikhail Bakhtin: Creation of a Prosaics (1990) and The First Hundred Years of Mikhail Bakhtin (1997), both of which are considered among the finest commentaries available on Bakhtin's life and work. She has written extensively on other significant Russian cultural figures, notably Boris Godunov, Modest Mussorgsky, Alexander Pushkin and Sigizmund Krzhizhanovsky. Though retired from formal teaching Emerson has continued to write, edit and translate in the field of Russian literature and Russian cultural studies.

Emerson has been widely recognized as one of the leading Slavists in the United States. In 2009 she received fellowships from the Guggenheim Foundation and American Council of Learned Societies for her research on Krzhizhanovsky. She has won lifetime awards for “outstanding contributions to the field” from the American Association of Teachers of Slavic and East European Languages (language and literature), and the Association for Slavic, East European, and Eurasian Studies (area studies), as well as awards for her individual books. In 1995, she was named the A. Watson Armour III University Professor Emeritus of Slavic Languages and Literatures at Princeton. In 2003 she became an Elected Member of the American Philosophical Society.

== Books ==
- Boris Godunov: Transpositions of a Russian Theme (1986)
- Mikhail Bakhtin: Creation of a Prosaics (with Gary Saul Morson) (1990)
- Modest Musorgsky and Boris Godunov: Myths, Realities, Reconsiderations (with Robert William Oldani) (1994)
- The First Hundred Years of Mikhail Bakhtin (1997)
- The Life of Musorgsky (1999)
- The Cambridge Introduction to Russian Literature (2008)
- All the Same the Words Don’t Go Away (Essays on Authors, Heroes, Aesthetics, and Stage Adaptations from the Russian Tradition) (2010)

== Translations ==
- The Dialogic Imagination: Four Essays by M. M. Bakhtin (with Michael Holquist) (1981)
- Mikhail Bakhtin, Problems of Dostoevsky's Poetics (1984)

== See also ==
- Russian literature
- Mikhail Bakhtin
- Polyphony (literature)
- Dialogue (Bakhtin)
