= Critical communicative methodology =

Research methodology based on intersubjective dialogue and an egalitarian relationship between the research team and those being researched (Gomez & Latorre, 2005).Current societies are characterized for using dialogue in different domains, seeing it as necessary for social progress and for avoiding different social conflicts (Castells 1996; Flecha, Gómez & Puigvert, 2003; Habermas, 2000). Critical communicative methodology is characterized for its dialogic orientation in different aspects of the research (Gomez & Flecha, 2004).

== Introduction ==
The critical communicative methodology is based on the direct participation of people whose reality is being studied throughout the whole research process, so that research becomes the result of the plurality of voices (Gómez et al., 2006; Flecha & Gomez 2004). In other words, the subject of research is directly included in the research itself, providing its interpretations, experiences and opinions enriching the research. The definition states that when using the critical communicative methodology, the researcher leaves their position of power and become well disposed to accept the best arguments, overcoming the division between researcher- subject and person researched- object, avoiding exclusion. Specifically, Julio Vargas Clavería and Jesús Gómez Alonso (2003), in their article named Why Romà do not like mainstream schools: Voices of a people without territory; argue that educational researchers have long ignored the Romani people and that this lack of attention has contributed to the persistence of educational inequity of the Romà community, proposing therefore a new approach to romaní educational research based on intersubjective dialogue, and the emergence of an egalitarian relationship between the researcher and the researched individuals.

This methodology has been used in international research projects such as Workaló (2001–2004); which is a Research and Technological Development (RTD) that forms part of the Fifth European Union Framework Programme; or INCLUD-ED (2006–2011), which is an Integrated Project of the Sixth Framework Programme. The main results of the Workaló project as well as different proposals with the objective of defining strategies for the inclusion of cultural minorities focusing on the Romani Community; were presented on 29 September 2004 in the Workaló Conference in Brussels. More recently, the results of the INCLUD-ED project, were disseminated across Europe, on 18 November 2009, in a Conference at the European Parliament, in Brussels, as well. In addition, the critical communicative methodology was introduced in the First International Congress of Quality Inquiry (May 2005) celebrated in the University of Illinois at Urbana- Champaign in May, 2010. The last edition (2010) has incorporated a round table about this methodology.

== Theoretical framework ==
The critical communicative perspective arises from different theoretical contributions. Jürgen Habermas (1984,1981), in his theory of communicative action, argues that the relationship between subjects should be based on validity claims rather than on power ones, seeing the relevance of the subject's interpretations following Alfred Schütz phenomenology (Schütz & Luckmann, 1974) However, this research perspective also draws from George H. Mead´s symbolic interactionism (1934), which stresses that interactions make people's interpretations change, and therefore knowledge not only depend on the individual subject. Harold Garfinkel´s ethnomethodology (1967) framework is considered for a better understanding of the subjects insights in their contexts (Gómez et al., 2006). The critical communicative perspective includes the contributions of objectivist and constructivist orientations but giving most of the emphasis on the processes of critical reflection and self- reflection and on intersubjectivity (Beck, Giddens and Lash; 1995), in which meanings are constructed through interaction, reaching consensus. The researcher brings into the dialogue their expertise and knowledge about the developments taken place in the scientific community which is contrasted with what social agents thoughts and experience (Touraine, Wieviorka, Flecha; 2004). Also others authors such as Jerome Bruner or Amartya Sen, have recognized the relevancy of the critical communicative methodology personally and in writing when joining members of the INCLUD-ED Consortium.

== Postulates ==
Communicative techniques are based on the creation of a favorable context for communication and understanding which entails the assumption of the following postulates of the critical communicative methodology:

- Universality of language and action: The critical methodology assumes that everyone has linguistic communicative competencies since, and according to Habermas (1987/1981), language and action are inherent capacities and therefore are considered universal attributes. Studies of Alexander Luria (1976), and of Cole and Scribner (1974), show that even people from the most disadvantaged zones develop cognitive capacities and communicative skills.
- People as transformative social agents: By this postulate, when using the critical communicative methodology, there is a recognition of all people's ability to reflect on and interpret their reality, create knowledge and build their own practices. Individuals are not cultural idiots (Garfinkel, 1967), but capable of interpreting social reality, of creating knowledge and of transforming structures. By this postulate, the existence of the subject is being affirmed, contradicting those theories such as the post structuralism that see researchers as holders of the knowledge, at a superior level, denying, in this way, the subject.
- Communicative rationality: In the same way that the critical communicative methodology states that everyone has the capacity for language and action, it also establishes that communicative rationality is the universal basis of these competencies and of egalitarian dialogue without coercion. While instrumental rationality leads us to use language as a medium to reach certain ends, communicative rationality uses language as an instrument for dialogue and understanding (Habermas, 1984/1981). Communicative rationality can be controversial among scientific, since it defends that there is no an important qualitative gap between those who research and those who are the object of research. Nevertheless, nowadays this postulate is being accepted more.
- Common sense:It is based on our life experience and consciousness, which is generally developed within the context we grow up in (cultural context). It is fundamental to recognize people's common sense to be able to interpret the reasons for an action, because, people might have different interpretations of things (Schütz, 1984/1932).
- The disappearance of the premise of an interpretative hierarchy: recognizes that people's arguments can have just as much validity, or even more than those of the research team. This is because in a communicative process there is methodological equality. When researchers are interpreting, it is important to ask participants for their own interpretations, to have an horizontal relationship that seeks an ideal situation of dialogue. In this way, the researcher and the social agents share their knowledge in order to identify the strategies that overcome the exclusionary elements.
- Equal epistemological level: As a continuation of the postulate on the disappearance of an interpretative hierarchy, the critical communicative methodology also breaks with the methodologically relevant gap between researchers and the researched with a researcher (Habermas, 1984/1981), who situates themself on egalitarian terms with the researched individuals in the research process as well as in the interpretation of actions. In order to understand or explain a phenomenon, researchers have to participate in the communicative process on an egalitarian basis with the people considered involved in the research issue. Everyone provides their interpretations, experience, and arrive at consensus on arguments through dialogue. With the critical communicative methodology, vulnerable groups have the opportunity to participate in a research that takes their voice into account to contribute to overcome their social exclusion. In other words, this methodology includes traditionally silenced voices.
- Dialogic knowledge:The positivist perspective has focused on the search for objectivity; being knowledge and reality, therefore, in the object. This type of knowledge, based on the object, is called objective knowledge. The interpretive orientation seeks knowledge from subjects, specifically concentrating on how they interpret and give meaning to reality. This type of knowledge, based on the subject, is called subjective knowledge. The critical communicative perspective, integrates the duality of object/subject through intersubjectivity and of the capacity for reflection and self-reflection (Beck, Giddens and Lash; 1995) establishing a knowledge based on validity rather than on power claims. The critical communicative methodology, and according to Vigotsky (1962), takes into account that knowledge is built through the interaction with the social environment being not a neutral one (Freire, 1970).

== Communicative data collection techniques ==
The critical communicative methodology allows the use of any type of technique, quantitative and qualitative, as long as it is always carried out with a communicative orientation. Communicative or dialogic research does not deny the use of any technique. In fact, always the research has to be developed following a communicative organization and communicative principles. Three main strategies for communicative data collection can be established:

- Communicative life story: The communicative life story is a dialogue between the researcher and the participants, with the objective of reflecting and interpreting the daily life of the person jointly. It is about analysing the thoughts, reflections, way of living and solving different situations; of the individuals with whom a dialogue is being established. It is about stating a cooperative process of understanding in which the two people, part of the dialogue, participate; where the researcher's contributions from the International scientific community are contrasted with the experiences and knowledge of the person researched. Before establishing the questions of the outline, it is important, first, to discuss about the motives of the story with the participant, stressing that the person is an active part of the research. During the conversation, flexibility is a crucial element. Once the story is analyzed, it is important to set a second meeting to agree on the results.
- Communicative discussion group: This form of carrying out a group consists in having a conversation that is carefully planned and designed to obtain information about the given theme, in a permissive and non- directed environment. It consists on a group conversation with a defined purpose. It is composed of a relatively small number of people, from six to eight, guided by an expert moderator, in a relaxed and comfortable environment. The participants in the research can have diverse characteristics (different backgrounds, origins, lifestyles...), depending on the objectives of the research. The main objective of this strategy is to obtain information about the needs, interests and concerns of a certain social group, object of study. From the communicative orientation, the discussion group supposes an egalitarian dialogue among various people (researchers and the researched individuals) obtaining a collective interpretation through dialogue. In this context, the researcher is another participant in the group, assuming, at the same time, the role of "coordinator", assuring that the dialogue is focused on the research issue and that everyone participates. Nonetheless, the fact of establishing an egalitarian dialogue doesn't mean that the knowledge of the researcher is not useful anymore; instead it supposes that they share it with everyone, always on egalitarian terms.
- Communicative observation:Observation, as a data collection strategy, allows the researcher to directly witness the phenomenon of study. The expression of "participant observation" is frequently used to designate a methodological strategy that implies combining observation with direct participation. One of the main characteristics of this type of observation, is its participatory nature, which allows the researcher to come closer to the studied individuals and groups, and the different problems that concern them in a more intensive way. Furthermore, it allows them to learn about social reality in a way that would be difficult to attain through other technique, obtaining a deeper understanding of things. For the registration of the observations, the observer uses fieldnotes; these are live registers with observations and reflections that are perceived in the natural context. The goal of this technique is to have narrative registers in the most exact and complete form possible. There is a dialogue that takes place before the conversation, for sharing the objectives, and there is another afterwards, in order to validate the results obtained. There can be two points of view about the same action, that of the observer and that of the observed. In this case, both parts seek points in common through dialogue in order to reach consensus. This is precisely what makes the observation communicative.

== Bibliography ==
- Beck, U., Giddens, A. & Lash, S. (1995). Reflexive modernization. politics, tradition and aesthetics in the modern social order.Stanford: Stanford University Press.
- Castells, M. (1996). The Rise of the Network Society, The Information Age: Economy, Society and Culture. Vol. I. Cambridge, MA; Oxford, UK: Blackwell.
- Claveria, J.; Gómez J. (2003). Why Roma Do Not Like Mainstream Schools: Voices of People without Territory. Harvard Educational Review Journal, 73, 4, 559-590.
- Cole, M.; Scribner, S. (1974). Culture and thought: A psychological introduction. Nueva York, Wiley.
- European Commission, Community Research (2002–2006). The Sixth Framework Programme in brief. Available on: http://ec.europa.eu/research/fp6/pdf/fp6-in-brief_en.pdf, retrieved 12 January 2010.
- Flecha, R. (2000). Sharing Words. Theory and Practice of Dialogic Learning. Lanham, M.D: Rowman & Littlefield.
- Flecha R.; Gómez J.; Puigvert, L. ( 2003). Contemporary Sociological Theory. New York: Peter Lang.
- Flecha, R.; Gómez, J. (2004): Participatory Paradigms: Researching ‘with’rather than ‘on’. In B. Crossan, J. Gallacher & M. Osborne (eds.) Researching Widening Access: Issues and approaches in an international context. pp. 129–140. London: Routledge
- Freire, P. (1970). Pedagogy of the oppressed. New York: Continuum Books
- Garfinkel, H. (1967.) Ethnomethodological Studies of Work. Londres: Routledge and Paul.
- Gómez, J., Latorre A., Flecha R., Sanchez M. (2006). Metodología comunicativa crítica. Barcelona: El Roure.
- Habermas, J. (1984). The Theory of communicative action. Volume I: Reason and the rationalization of society and volume II: Lifeworld and system: a critique of functionalist reason. Boston: Beacon Press (O.V. 1981).´
- Habermas, J. (2000). The inclusion of the Other. Cambridge: MIT Press.
- Latorre, A.; Gómez, J. (2005). Critical communicative methodology. First International Congress of Qualitative Inquire, University of Illinois, Urbana- Champaign, May 5–7.
- Luria, A. R. (1976). The Cognitive Development: Its Cultural and Social Foundations. Cambridge (Massachusetts): Harvard University Press.
- Mead, G.H. (1934). Mind, Self and Society. Chicago: University of Chicago Press.
- Schütz, A. & Luckmann, T. (1974). Structure of the Life- World. London: Heinemann.
- Schütz, A. (1984). The Phenomenology of the social world. Evanston, Illinois: Northwestern University Press (O.V. 1932).
- Touraine, A.; Wieviorka, M. & Flecha R. (2004). Conocimiento e identidad. Voces de grupos culturales en la investigación social. Barcelona: El Roure.
- Vygotsky (1962).Thought and language. Cambridge, Mass., MIT Press.
