= Lídia Puigvert =

Sociologist

- Lecturing in 2012
- Born: Lídia Puigvert Mallart; 29 May 1970 (age 56); Bogotá, Colombia
- Occupation: Sociologist

Lídia Puigvert Mallart (born 29 May 1970) is a Colombian lecturer of sociology at the University of Barcelona. She is a feminist author known for her theoretical contributions to dialog feminism and the overcoming of gender violence. She has been published many times and co-authored Women and Social Transformation with Judith Butler and Elisabeth Beck-Gernsheim. Due to her relevant contributions in gender studies, she was appointed as a consultant for European research projects such as IMPACT-EV, INCLUD-ED, and WORKALÓ. She was a principal investigator in several projects and coordinated Life paths that move away or move closer to human trafficking with the purpose of sexual exploitation. In 2008, she was a member of the Advisory Committee on Violence Against Women at the European Women's Lobby Observatory. As a lecturer, she has been invited to present conferences and seminars at different universities around the world, such as Oxford, Cambridge, and Harvard.

== Biography ==
Lídia Puigvert was born in Bogotá on 29 May 1970 and was raised in Malgrat de Mar, a coastline village of Maresme.

In 1992, she started her collaboration with the Centre of Research in Theories and Practices that Overcome Inequalities (CREA), working with Ramon Flecha on the initial team. One of the research lines Puigvert promoted was the inclusion of other women's voices - primarily non-academic women who had been traditionally excluded from feminist debates. This research was consolidated in her contribution to the theory of dialogic feminism. Within the feminism sphere, Puigvert also contributed to the overcoming of gender violence.

In January 2004, as part of her work on gender violence, Puigvert worked with the CREA-SAFO Women's Group to speak out against the hostile environment at Spanish universities, where there were neither mechanisms of detection nor prevention of gender violence. In response to her positions, a lobby of university harassers initiated a smear campaign to discredit her and maintain the silence on gender violence at Spanish universities. During the course of this smear campaign, Puigvert's husband, Jesús Gómez, died.

Despite the personal cost of harassment, Puigvert continued her research, culminating in a contribution to the bill, "For the Effective Equality of Men and Women", signed into law on 22 March 2007. The law ruled that all Spanish universities must have equality commissions and protocols against gender violence. This work was acknowledged by Sarah Rankin, director of the Office of Sexual Assault Prevention and Response at Harvard University in 2010.

Puigvert also developed the preventative socialization of gender violence concept, introduced by Gómez. This contribution has been published in several JCR scientific articles and is one of the bases of the dialogic model of conflict resolution.

Puigvert is currently researching the illegal female trafficking system that affects millions of women worldwide. Puigvert continues to work in academia and on social issues to improve the lives of women around the world.

== Publications ==
- Puigvert, L. (2014). "Preventive socialization of Gender Violence. Moving forward using the Communicative Methodology of Research". Qualitative Inquiry. 20 (7), 839–843. doi:10.1177/1077800414537221
- Sordé, T.; Serradell, O.; Puigvert, L.; Munté; A (2013). "Solidarity networks that challenge racialized discourses: The case of Romani immigrant women in Spain". European Journal of Women's Studies, 20 (4),1 -16. doi: 10.1177/1350506813510425
- Flecha, R., Puigvert, L. & Ríos, O. (2013)."The New Alternative Masculinities and the Overcoming of Gender Violence". International and Multidisciplinar Journal of Social Sciences, 2 (1), 88–113.
- Puigvert, L.; Christou, M.; Holford, J. (2012). Critical "Communicative Methodology: including vulnerable voices in research through dialogue". Cambridge Journal of Education, 42 (4), 513 -526.doi:10.1080/0305764X.2012.733341
- Prieto, O.; Puigvert, L.; Santacruz, I.(2012). "Overcoming the odds: Constricted ethnicity in middle-class Romà". Identities: Global Studies in Culture and Power, 19 (2), 191–209. doi:10.1080/1070289X.2012.672856
- Gómez, A.; Puigvert, L.; Flecha, R. (2011). "Critical Communicative Methodology: Informing real social transformation through research". Qualitative Inquiry, 17 (3), 235–245. doi: 10.1177/1077800410397802
- Christou, M; Puigvert, L (2011). "The role of 'Other Women' in current educational transformations". International studies in sociology of education. 21(1), 77–90. doi:10.1080/09620214.2011.543855
- Flecha, A.; Puigvert, L. (2010). Contributions to social theory from Dialogic Feminism: giving voice to all women in Teaching Social Theory. New York: Peter Lang Publishers.
- Valls, R.; Puigvert, L. & Duque, E. (2008). "Gender violence among teenagers: socialization and prevention". Violence Against Women, 14(7), 759- 785. doi: 10.1177/1077801208320365
- De Botton, L, Puivert, L.; Sánchez-Aroca, M. (2005). The Inclusion of Other Women: Breaking the Silence through Dialogic Learning. Dordrecht, Netherlands: Springer.
- Puigvert, L.; Valls, R. (2005). Dialogical Learning in Popular Education Movements in Spain in Popular Education: Engaging the academy. Leiceste: NIACE.
- Elboj, C. ; Puigvert, L. (2004). "Interactions among 'other women': Personal and social meaning". Journal of Social Work Practice. 18 (3). 357–364. doi:0.1080/0265053042000314429
- Beck-Gernsheim, E., Butler, J., & Puigvert, L. (2003). Women and Social Transformation. New York: Peter Lang Publishing.
- Flecha, R.; Gómez, J. & Puigvert, L. (2003).Contemporary Sociological Theory. New York: Peter Lang.
- Flecha, R. & Puigvert, L. (2002). "The voice of the voiceless and the new forms of governance". Journal of Lifelong Learning in Europe, (3), 143–148.
