= Rupert Wegerif =

British education professor (born 1959)

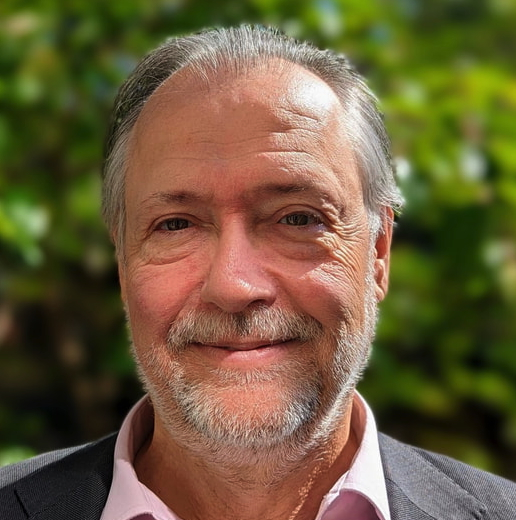
- Born: 2 September 1959 (age 67)
- Known for: Theory of Dialogic Education for the Internet Age.

Academic background
- Education: University of Kent; University of Bristol; Queen Mary and Westfield College; Open University

Academic work
- Discipline: Education
- Institutions: University of Cambridge; University of Exeter; University of Southampton
- Website: www.rupertwegerif.name

Rupert Wegerif (born 2 September 1959) is a professor of education at the University of Cambridge in England.

== Overview ==
Prof. Wegerif is a writer and researcher in the field of dialogic education and dialogic education with technology. He has proposed a dialogic theory of education for the AI-Enhanced Internet Age, and conducted research on education technology as a support for teaching dialogue in classrooms as well as designing for dialogue with the Internet. He was the founder of the Elsevier journal Thinking Skills and Creativity and lead editor until 2017. He is founder and director of the Digital Education Futures Initiative (DEFI) at Hughes Hall, Cambridge.

== Education ==
Wegerif studied Philosophy with Social Anthropology at the University of Kent (1980–83), began a PhD on Derrida and Millenarianism at the University of Kent in 1984 which he did not complete, did a Post-Graduate Certificate of Education (PGCE) specialising in Religious Education at Bristol from 1990 to 1991 and a Masters in Information Technology at Queen Mary and Westfield College, London University, 1991 to 1992 followed by a PhD in Education Technology at the Institute of Education Technology in the UK Open University, 1992 to 1996. His topic was ‘Using computers to teach reasoning through talking across the curriculum’. Neil Mercer was one of his supervisors, the other was Pat Fung

== Career ==
Wegerif began his academic career at the Open University working with Neil Mercer on a range of funded projects to explore the impact of teaching ‘Exploratory Talk’ on learning, especially on learning with computers. In 2004, he went to the University of Southampton as a Reader and in 2006 he joined the University of Exeter as a professor. In 2017, Wegerif became the Professor of Education (2000) at the Faculty of Education, University of Cambridge. There he is a member of the Cambridge Educational Dialogue Research Group (CEDiR). In November 2017, Wegerif was awarded a Fellowship at Hughes Hall College (Cambridge). He founded the Digital Education Futures Initiative at Hughes Hall Cambridge in 2020. He was the first Managing Director of this new 'think and do' centre moving on to be the Academic Director in 2022.

He is known for developing a dialogic theory of Education. This argues for the importance of dialogue as an aim of education as well as being a means to education. Wegerif understands learning as being motivated by relationships and taking the form of 'dialogic switches' whereby students take on different perspectives within already existing dialogues. The originality of the theory lies in the focus on the significance for development of the 'dialogic gap' between perspectives. This leads to a model of development that is not primarily characterised in terms of individual identities or expanding knowledge but in terms of expanding 'dialogic space'. Education is understood as opening, widening and deepening dialogic space through dialogue with specific others, cultural ‘general others’ personifying communities of practice and also ‘the Infinite Other’. The ‘Infinite Other’ is the idea that the unbounded horizon of knowledge can act as a voice within educational dialogues. His recent work outlines the role of technology in education for expanding dialogue.

Wegerif has gained significant sums in research funding for projects exploring diversity in science education and developing tools to support Learning to Learn Together (L2L2) online. In 2006, he founded the journal Thinking Skills and Creativity with Anna Craft. They edited the journal together until Anna Craft's death in 2014. Wegerif remained chief editor of the journal through June 2018, and was subsequently replaced by Teresa Cremin and Pamela Burnard.

Wegerif was appointed Honorary Professor at Beijing University of Posts and Telecommunications and in 2025 received the Global Award for Innovation in Education Research Methods, presented at East China Normal University, Shanghai.

== Books ==
Wegerif's books include:

- Wegerif, R.(2025) Rethinking Educational Theory: Education as Expanding Dialogue. Edward Elgar.
- Wegerif, R., & Major, L. (2023). The Theory of Educational Technology: Towards a Dialogic Foundation for Design (1st ed.). Routledge.
- Kershner, R., Hennessy, S., Wegerif, R., & Ahmed, A. (2020). Research Methods for Educational Dialogue. Bloomsbury Publishing.
- Mercer, N., Wegerif, R., & Major, L. (2019). The Routledge International Handbook of Research on Dialogic Education. Routledge.
- Kerslake, L. and Wegerif, R. (Eds.) (2018) The Theory of Teaching Thinking. International Perspectives. Routledge
- Phillipson, N and Wegerif, R (2017). Dialogic Education: Mastering core concepts through thinking together. London and New York, Routledge.
- Wegerif, R, Li, L. and Kaufman, J.C. (Eds.)(2015) The Routledge International Handbook of Research on Teaching Thinking, Routledge.
- Wegerif, R (2013) Dialogic: Education for the Internet Age. London: Routledge
- Mansour, N and Wegerif, R. (Eds.)(2013) Science Education for Diversity. New Jersey: Springer
- Wegerif, R (2010) Mind-Expanding: Teaching for Thinking and Creativity. Buckingham, UK: Open University Press/mcgraw Hill
- Wegerif. R. (2007) Dialogic, Education and Technology: Expanding the Space of Learning. New York: Springer-Verlag.
- Williams, S and Wegerif, R. (2005) Radical Encouragement: Changing cultures of thinking. Birmingham: Imaginative Minds.
- Wegerif, R. and Dawes, L. (2004) Thinking and learning with ICT: raising achievement in primary classrooms. London: Routledge.
- Dawes, L., Mercer, N. And Wegerif, R. (2004 2nd Edition) Thinking Together: A programme of activities for developing speaking, listening and thinking skills for children aged 8–11. Birmingham: Imaginative Minds Ltd.
- Wegerif, R. and Scrimshaw, P. (Eds.) (1997) Computers and Talk in the Primary Classroom. Clevedon: Multilingual Matters.
