= Centre of Research in Theories and Practices that Overcome Inequalities =

Spanish research centre

The Centre of Research in Theories and Practices that Overcome Inequalities (CREA) was founded in 1991 by Ramon Flecha, a professor of Sociology at the University of Barcelona. After Flecha's resignation as the Director of CREA in 2006, Marta Soler, Professor of Sociological Theory, assumed the post. In 2015, CREA ceased to be a research centre and became a "community of scholars" under the name CREA-Community of Researchers on Excellence for All. CREA was one of the centres that first joined the Scientific Park of Barcelona. In December 2025, CREA announced its dissolution in a statement published on its official social media channels. The announcement came shortly after the University of Barcelona referred an ongoing investigation into alleged misconduct involving Flecha and other affiliated academics to the Public Prosecutor’s Office, citing the seriousness of the allegations and preliminary findings from an internal expert commission.

== Research ==
CREA used a critical communicative methodology.

The Centre carried out both international and national projects in developing the following lines of research:

- Dialogic Theories (including the Critical Communicative Research Methodology and Speech Acts, Social uses of the information and Communication technologies)
- Cultural Groups (Roma, Arab- Muslim and Jewish community) and migration
- Learning Communities
- Gender (Gender Violence)
- Governance and Active Citizenship

From the lines of research described above, five groups were created by CREA:

- Roma Studies Group
- Jewish Studies Group
- Alhiwar Arab-Muslim Group
- Interreligious Dialogue
- SAFO CREA Women’s Group

CREA also conducted research on inequality in Brazil, United States, Korea and Australia.

Seminars were held with authors such as: Paulo Freire (1994), Ulrich Beck and Elisabeth Beck Gernsheim (1998), Alain Touraine (1999), Jon Elster (2001), Judith Butler (2001), Alejandro Portes (2002), Gordon Wells (2003), John Searle (2003) or Gary Orfield (2003).

Members of CREA have given lectures and seminars at several universities in Brazil, United States, Germany, Australia, Korea and others.

== Controversies ==
Since the mid-2000s, the research group CREA has been involved in several public controversies. In 2004 and 2006, complaints regarding its internal functioning and alleged coercive practices were examined by Spanish prosecutors, who ultimately dismissed the cases due to lack of criminal evidence, while recommending internal changes after identifying discriminatory practices against some members. In later years, CREA’s research methods were also publicly questioned by academic sociologists.

In 2016, the University of Barcelona referred seven complaints from students and faculty members to the public prosecutor, alleging cult-like behavior, psychological manipulation, and invasion of privacy within CREA. These complaints were dismissed in 2017 due to insufficient evidence to pursue criminal action. CREA stated that the accusations were part of a defamation campaign related to its research on gender-based violence and sexual harassment in universities.

In 2025, new allegations emerged involving claims of sexual harassment, abuse of power, and coercive behavior linked to members of CREA and its founder, Ramón Flecha. Fourteen women filed formal complaints with the University of Barcelona, accusing him of maintaining sexual relationships with junior researchers and students. As a result, an academic distinction awarded to CREA’s director, Marta Soler, was provisionally suspended.

During the same period, the Spanish Sociological Federation issued a public statement condemning the allegations related to the environment of the CREA group, and several research groups publicly expressed concern about CREA’s links with the Catalan Sociological Association, announcing that they would refrain from participating in its conferences unless safeguards against abusive practices were ensured. Subsequently, the Institute of Catalan Studies suspended the governing board and activities of the Catalan Sociological Association due to its links with CREA and opened an internal investigation.

In December 2025, after receiving a total of sixteen complaints describing “very serious sexual, vexatious, and intimidating conduct” and characterizing CREA as a “high-control coercive group”, the University of Barcelona referred the case to the public prosecutor.

== See also ==
- Dialogic learning
