= Harry Kempen =

Dutch cultural psychologist

Harry J.G. Kempen (February 9, 1937 – March 26, 2000) was a Dutch cultural psychologist, and associate professor at the Nijmegen Cultural Psychology Group (NCPG) of the Radboud University Nijmegen, known for his work with Hubert Hermans on the Dialogical self theory.

== Life and work ==
Kempen was born in Nieuwenhagen, in southeastern Limburg, Netherlands. After his graduation he started his academic career as researcher at the Psychological Laboratory of the Radboud University Nijmegen in the 1960s. Kempen's early research had focussed on "The strategy of peace in sociological perspective", and he published another article about "Psychology and the problems of war prevention and peacebuilding".

In 1972, he edited his first publication with Vimala Thakar In the 1972 unpublished article, entitled "From the cabinet of exotic comportment to a general theory of behavior", he gave a sketch of his "cultural psychology, that was critical of psychology itself, but at the same time stimulating all of us to look beyond culture." In the 1970s Kempen also joined the Department of Culture and Religion Psychology, where he lectured in Cultural psychology until the late-1990s. Among his students were Jürgen Straub, German Professor of intercultural communication,; Hub Zwart, Professor of Philosophy at the Radboud University Nijmegen; Paul Voestermans (who in 1970 was the only student placed under Kempen's supervision; on Kempen's initiative he joined the University of Colorado in June, 1971 till November,1972 to study with Richard Jessor at the Institute of Behavioral Science, CU, Boulder, Colorado. PhD 1976: Jacques Janssen & Paul Voestermans, De Vergruisde Universiteit.) and Theo Verheggen (PhD 2005).

In the 1980s, Kempen conducted more general research in health behaviour in the Netherlands, which resulted in the 1993 book about "Western standards in mental health." He also wrote some biographical articles for the "Biographical Dictionary of Netherlands", and a publication about "The Nijmegen cultural psychology."

In the 1990s, Kempen and Hubert Hermans developed a new approach in cultural psychology around the concept of the dialogical self. In 1993, they published the seminal work The dialogical self: Meaning as movement, and published several articles in American Psychologist, Journal of Personality and Theory & Psychology. Kempen experienced depression in the later years of his career. In 2000, he died in Nijmegen four days before his retirement from the Radboud University. A colleague described him as the "personification of cultural psychology," reflecting his central role in the development of the field at the university.

== Selected publications ==
- Kempen, H., P.P.L.A. Voestermans & V.J. Welten. De Nijmeegse cultuurpsychologie. Psychologisch Laboratorium, Universiteit Nijmegen, 1991.
- Kortmann, F.A.M., H.J.G. Kempen & H. Procee. Westerse normen in de geestelijke gezondheidszorg. Baarn: Ambo, 1993.
- Hermans, Hubert J.M., and Harry JG Kempen. The dialogical self: Meaning as movement. Academic Press, 1993.
- Kempen, H. (2002). Toward a universal psychology of the self; written legacy of Harry Kempen, cultural psychologist. Nijmegen: Sectie Cultuur- en Godsdienstpsychologie van de Katholieke Universiteit Nijmegen.

Articles, a selection:

- Hermans, Hubert J., Harry J. Kempen, and Rens J. Van Loon. "The dialogical self: Beyond individualism and rationalism." American psychologist 47.1 (1992): 23.
- Hermans, Hubert JM, Trix I. Rijks, and Harry JG Kempen. "Imaginal dialogues in the self: Theory and method." Journal of Personality 61.2 (1993): 207–236.
- Kempen, Harry JG. "Mind as Body Moving in Space Bringing the Body Back into Self-Psychology." Theory & Psychology 6.4 (1996): 715–731.
- Hermans, Hubert JM, and Harry JG Kempen. "Moving cultures: The perilous problems of cultural dichotomies in a globalizing society." American psychologist 53.10 (1998): 1111.
