= Dialogic learning =

Learning through egalitarian dialogue

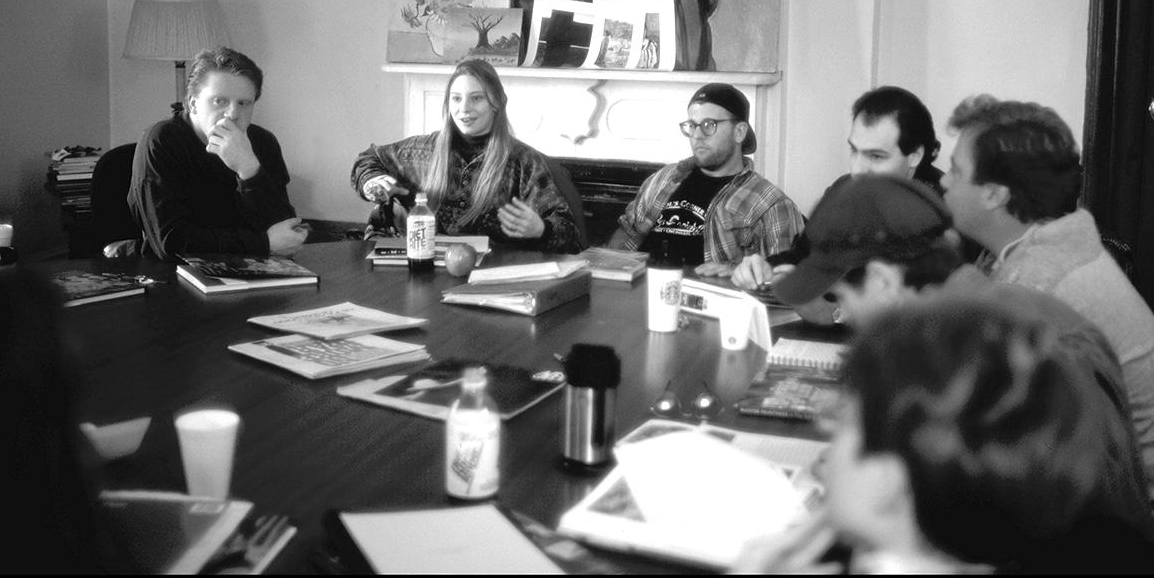
Dialogic learning at Shimer College

Dialogic learning is learning that takes place through dialogue. It is typically the result of egalitarian dialogue; in other words, the consequence of a dialogue in which different people provide arguments based on validity claims and not on power claims.

The concept of dialogic learning is not a new one. Within the Western tradition, it is frequently linked to the Socratic dialogues. It is also found in many other traditions; for example, the book The Argumentative Indian, written by Nobel Prize of Economics winner Amartya Sen, situates dialogic learning within the Indian tradition and observes that an emphasis on discussion and dialogue spread across Asia with the rise of Buddhism.

In recent times, the concept of dialogic learning has been linked to contributions from various perspectives and disciplines, such as the theory of dialogic action, the dialogic inquiry approach, the theory of communicative action, the notion of dialogic imagination and the dialogical self. In addition, the work of an important range of contemporary authors is based on dialogic conceptions. Among those, it is worth mentioning transformative learning theory; Michael Fielding, who sees students as radical agents of change; Timothy Koschmann, who highlights the potential advantages of adopting dialogicality as the basis of education; and Anne Hargrave, who demonstrates that children in dialogic-learning conditions make significantly larger gains in vocabulary, than do children in a less dialogic reading environment.

Specifically, the concept of dialogic learning (Flecha) evolved from the investigation and observation of how people learn both outside and inside of schools, when acting and learning freely is allowed. At this point, it is important to mention the "Learning Communities", an educational project which seeks social and cultural transformation of educational centers and their surroundings through dialogic learning, emphasizing egalitarian dialogue among all community members, including teaching staff, students, families, entities, and volunteers. In the learning communities, it is fundamental the involvement of all members of the community because, as research shows, learning processes, regardless of the learners' ages, and including the teaching staff, depend more on the coordination among all the interactions and activities that take place in different spaces of the learners' lives, like school, home, and workplace, than only on interactions and activities developed in spaces of formal learning, such as classrooms. Along these lines, the "Learning Communities" project aims at multiplying learning contexts and interactions with the objective of all students reaching higher levels of development.

== Classroom education ==
Dialogic education is an educational philosophy and pedagogical approach that draws on many authors and traditions and applies dialogic learning. In effect, dialogic education takes place through dialogue by opening up dialogic spaces for the co-construction of new meaning to take place within a gap of differing perspectives. In a dialogic classroom, students are encouraged to build on their own and others' ideas, resulting not only in education through dialogue but also in education for dialogue. Teachers and students are in an equitable relationship and listen to multiple points of view. The pedagogy aims on arriving at the goal: the students' knowing for and through themselves and therefore "casting the teacher as a guide rather than a director".

Dialogic approaches to education typically involve dialogue in the form of face-to-face talk including questioning and exploring ideas within a 'dialogic space' but can also encompass other instances where 'signs' are exchanged between people, for instance via computer-mediated communication. In this way, dialogic approaches need not be limited only to classroom-based talk or "external talk".

In teaching through the opening of a shared dialogic space, dialogic education draws students into the co-construction of shared knowledge by questioning and building on dialogue rather than simply learning a set of facts. As argued by Mikhail Bakhtin, children learn through persuasive dialogue rather than an authoritative transmission of facts, which enables them to understand by seeing from different points of view. Merleau-Ponty writes that when dialogue works it should no longer be possible to determine who is thinking because learners will find themselves thinking together. It has been suggested by Robin Alexander that in dialogic education, teachers should frame questions carefully in order to encourage reflection and take different students' contributions and present them as a whole. In addition, answers should be considered as leading to further questions in dialogue rather than an end goal.

=== Definitions of dialogic ===
There is a lack of clarity around what is meant by the term 'dialogic' when used to refer to educational approaches. The term 'dialogue' itself is derived from two words in classical Greek, 'dia' meaning 'through' and 'logos' meaning 'word' or 'discourse'. Dialogic is defined by the Oxford English Dictionary as an adjective applied to describe anything 'relating to or in the form of dialogue'. Dialogic can also be used in contrast to 'monologic', which is the idea that there is only one true perspective and so that everything has one final correct meaning or truth. Dialogic, however, contends that there is always more than one voice in play behind any kind of explicit claim to knowledge. If knowledge is a product of dialogue it follows that knowledge is never final since the questions we ask and so the answers that we receive, will continue to change.

Dialogic education has been defined as engaging students in an ongoing process of shared inquiry taking the form of a dialogue and as Robin Alexander outlines in his work on dialogic teaching, it involves drawing students into a process of co-constructing knowledge. Rupert Wegerif sums this up by claiming that 'Dialogic Education is education for dialogue as well as education through dialogue'.

=== Formats ===
There are a number of formats of instruction, that have been recognized as "dialogic" (as opposed to "monologic").

- Interactional: Dialogue involves a high student-teacher talk ratio, short utterances/turns, and interactive exchanges.
- Question-answer: Dialogue involves either a teacher asking students questions and eliciting answers from the students or students asking questions and eliciting answers from the teacher and/or one another.
- Conversational: Instructional dialogue is modeled after natural mundane everyday conversations.
- Without authority: Dialogic guidance occurs among equal peers as authority distorts dialogic processes. Jean Piaget was the first scholar who articulated this position.

=== Types ===
There are a number of types of dialogic pedagogy, that is, where the form and the content is recognized as "dialogic".

- Paideia: Learning through asking thought-provoking questions, challenging assumptions, beliefs, and ideas, that involve argumentation and disagreements. This notion comes from Socratic dialogues described and developed by Plato.
- Exploratory talk for learning: Collective mindstorming and probing ideas, enabling "the speaker to try out ideas, to hear how they sound, to see what others make of them, to arrange information and ideas into different patterns" (p. 4).
- Internally persuasive discourse: Bakhtin's notion of "internally persuasive discourse" (IPD) has become influential in helping conceptualize learning. There are at least three approaches to how this notion is currently used in the literature on education:
1. IPD is understood as appropriation when somebody else's words, ideas, approaches, knowledge, feelings, become one's own. In this approach, "internal" in IPD is understood as an individual's psychological and personal deep conviction.
2. IPD understood as a student's authorship recognized and accepted by a community of practice, in which the student generates self-assignments and long-term projects within the practice.
3. IPD is understood as a dialogic regime of the participants' testing ideas and searching for the boundaries of personally-vested truths. In this approach, "internal" is interpreted as internal to the dialogue itself in which everything is "dialogically tested and forever testable" (p. 319).

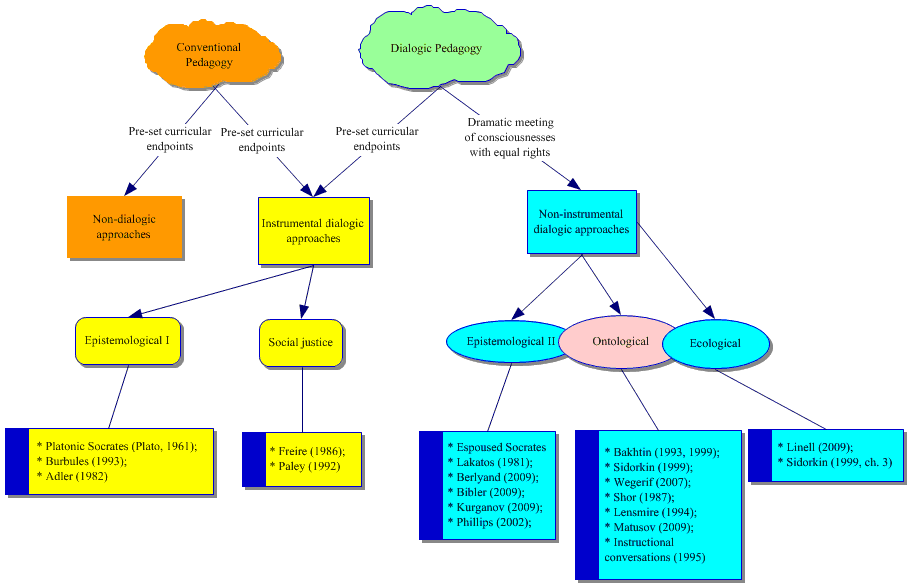
The map of the existing dialogic pedagogy approaches

=== Instrumental ===
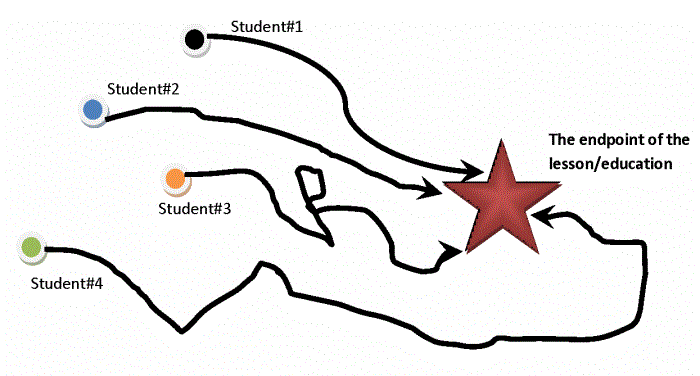
Curricular space of conventional (monologically manipulative) education.

Instrumental dialogic pedagogy uses dialogue for achieving non-dialogic purposes, usually making students arrive at certain preset learning outcomes. For example, Nicolas Burbules defines dialogue in teaching instrumentally as facilitating new understanding, "Dialogue is an activity directed toward discovery and new understanding, which stands to improve the knowledge, insight, or sensitivity of its participants".

The teacher presents the endpoint of the lesson, for example, "At the end of the lesson, the students will be able to understand/master the following knowledge and skills." However, the teacher's method of leading students to the endpoint can be individualized both in instruction techniques and in time taken. Different students are "closer" or further" from the endpoint and require different strategies to get them there. Thus, for Socrates to manipulate Meno to the preset endpoint – what is virtue is not known and problematic – is not the same as manipulating Anytus to the same endpoint. It takes different and individualized instructional strategies.

Socrates, Paulo Freire and Vivian Paley all strongly critique the idea of preset endpoints however in practice they often set endpoints.

Instrumental dialogic pedagogy remains influential and important for scholars and practitioners of dialogic pedagogy field. Some appreciate its focus on asking good questions, attendance to subjectivity, use of provocations and contradictions, and the way it disrupts familiar and unreflected relations. However, others are concerned about the teacher's manipulation of the student's consciousness and its intellectualism.

=== Non-instrumental ===
In contrast to instrumental approaches to dialogic pedagogy, non-instrumental approaches to dialogic pedagogy view dialogue not as a pathway or strategy for achieving meaning or knowledge but as the medium in which they live. Following Bakhtin, meaning is understood as living in the relationship between a genuine question seeking for information and a sincere answer aiming at addressing this question. Non-instrumental dialogic pedagogy focuses on "eternal damn final questions". It is interested in the mundane only because it can give it the material and opportunity to move to the sublime. This is seen, for example, in the work of Christopher Phillips.

The non-instrumental "epistemological dialogue", a term introduced by Alexander Sidorkin, is a purified dialogue to abstract a single main theme, a development of a main concept, and unfold the logic. According to Sidorkin, ontological dialogic pedagogy priorities human ontology in pedagogical dialogue:

Sociolinguist Per Linell and educational philosopher Alexander Sidorkin evidence a non-instrumental ecological approach to dialogic pedagogy that focuses on the dialogicity of the mundane everyday social interaction, its non-constrained nature, in which participants can have freedom to move in and out of the interaction, and the absence or minimum of pedagogical violence. Using the metaphor of "free-range kids", Lenore Skenazy defines the participants in this ecological dialogue as free-range dialogic participants.

== Theories ==
=== Wells: dialogic inquiry ===
Gordon Wells (1999) defines "inquiry" not as a method but as a predisposition for questioning, trying to understand situations collaborating with others with the objective of finding answers. "Dialogic inquiry" is an educational approach that acknowledges the dialectic relationship between the individual and the society, and an attitude for acquiring knowledge through communicative interactions. Wells points out that the predisposition for dialogic inquiry depends on the characteristics of the learning environments, and that is why it is important to reorganize them into contexts for collaborative action and interaction. According to Wells, dialogic inquiry not only enriches individuals' knowledge but also transforms it, ensuring the survival of different cultures and their capacity to transform themselves according to the requirements of every social moment.

=== Freire: the theory of dialogic action ===
Paulo Freire (1970) states that human nature is dialogic, and believes that communication has a leading role in our life. We are continuously in dialogue with others, and it is in that process that we create and recreate ourselves. According to Freire, dialogue is a claim in favor of the democratic choice of educators. Educators, in order to promote free and critical learning should create the conditions for dialogue that encourages the epistemological curiosity of the learner. The goal of the dialogic action is always to reveal the truth by interacting with others and the world. In his dialogic action theory, Freire distinguishes between dialogical actions, the ones that promote understanding, cultural creation, and liberation; and non-dialogic actions, which deny dialogue, distort communication, and reproduce power.

=== Habermas: the theory of communicative action ===
Rationality, for Jürgen Habermas (1984), has less to do with knowledge and its acquisition than with the use of knowledge that individuals who are capable of speech and action make. In instrumental rationality, social agents make an instrumental use of knowledge: they propose certain goals and aim to achieve them in an objective world. On the contrary, in communicative rationality, knowledge is the understanding provided by the objective world as well as by the intersubjectivity of the context where action develops. If communicative rationality means understanding, then the conditions that make reaching consensus possible have to be studied. This need brings us to the concepts of arguments and argumentation. While arguments are conclusions that consist of validity claims as well as the reasons by which they can be questioned, argumentation is the kind of speech in which participants give arguments to develop or turn down the validity claims that have become questionable. At this point, Habermas' differentiation between validity claims and power claims is important. We may attempt to have something we say to be considered good or valid by imposing it by means of force, or by being ready to enter a dialogue in which other people's arguments may lead us to rectify our initial stances. In the first case, the interactant holds power claims, while in the second case, validity claims are held. While in power claims, the argument of force is applied; in validity claims, the force of an argument prevails. Validity claims are the basis of dialogic learning.

=== Bakhtin: dialogic imagination ===
Mikhail Bakhtin established (1981) that there is a need of creating meanings in a dialogic way with other people. His concept of dialogism states a relation among language, interaction, and social transformation. Bakhtin believes that the individual does not exist outside of dialogue. The concept of dialogue, itself, establishes the existence of the "other" person. In fact, it is through dialogue that the "other" cannot be silenced or excluded. Bakhtin states that meanings are created in processes of reflection between people. And these are the same meanings that we use in later conversations with others, where those meanings get amplified and even change as we acquire new meanings. In this sense, Bakhtin states that every time that we talk about something that we have read about, seen, or felt; we are actually reflecting the dialogues we have had with others, showing the meanings that we have created in previous dialogues. This is, what is said cannot be separated from the perspectives of others: the individual speech and the collective one are deeply related. It is in this sense that Bakhtin talks about a chain of dialogues, to point out that every dialogue results from a previous one and, at the same time, every new dialogue is going to be present in future ones.

=== CREA: dialogic interactions and interactions of power ===
In their debate with John Searle (Searle & Soler 2004) the Centre of Research in Theories and Practices that Overcome Inequalities (CREA, from now on) made two critiques to Habermas. CREA's work on communicative acts points out, on the one hand, that the key concept is interaction and not claim; and, on the other hand, that in relationships can be identified power interactions and dialogic interactions. Although a manager can hold validity claims when inviting his employee to have a coffee with him, the employee can be moved to accept because of the power claim that arises from the unequal structure of the company and of the society, which places her in a subordinate position to the employer. CREA defines power relations as those in which the power interactions involved predominate over the dialogic interactions, and dialogic relations as those in which dialogic interactions are prevalent over power interactions. Dialogic interactions are based on equality and seek understanding through speakers appreciating the provided arguments to the dialogue regardless of the position of power of the speaker. In the educational institutions of democracies, we can find more dialogic interactions than in the educational centers of dictatorships. Nonetheless, even in the educational centers of democracies, when discussing curricular issues, the voice of the teaching staff prevails over the voice of the families, which is almost absent. The educational projects that have contributed to transforming some power interactions into dialogic interactions show that one learns much more through dialogic interactions than through power ones.

== History ==
Dialogic education is argued to have historical roots in ancient oral educational traditions. The chavrusa rabbinic approach, for example, involved pairs of learners analyzing, discussing, and debating shared texts during the era of the Tannaim (approximately 10-220 CE).

Dialogue was also a defining feature of early-Indian texts, rituals, and practices that spread across Asia with the rise of Buddhism. Indeed, one of the earliest references to an idea of dialogue is in the Rigveda (c. 1700-1100 BC), where the poet asks the deities Mitra and Varuna to defend him from the one "who has no pleasure in questioning, or in repeated calling, or in dialogue". Later, Buddhist educators such as Nichiren (1222–1282) would themselves present work in a dialogic form. It has also been linked to traditional Islamic education with Halaqat al-'Ilm, or Halaqa for short, in mosque-based education whereby small groups participate in discussion and questioning in 'circles of knowledge'. A dialogic element has similarly been found in Confucian education.

Links are often also made with the Socratic method, established by Socrates (470-399 BC), which is a form of cooperative argumentative dialogue to stimulate critical thinking and to draw out ideas and underlying presumptions. Dialogic practices and dialogic pedagogy existed in Ancient Greece, before, during, and after Socrates' time, possibly in other forms than those depicted by Plato. There is some debate over whether the Socratic method should be understood as dialectic rather than as dialogic. However it is interpreted, Socrates approach as described by Plato has been influential in informing modern-day conceptions of dialogue, particularly in Western culture. This is notwithstanding the fact that dialogic educational practices may have existed in Ancient Greece prior to the life of Socrates.

Although modern interest in dialogic pedagogy seems to have emerged only in the 1960s, it was a very old and probably widespread educational practice. In more recent times, Mikhail Bakhtin introduced the idea of dialogism, as opposed to "monologism", to literature. Paulo Freire's work, Pedagogy of the Oppressed introduced these ideas to educational theory. Over the last five decades, robust research evidence has mounted on the impact of dialogic education. A growing body of research indicates that dialogic methods lead to improved performance in students' content knowledge, text comprehension, and reasoning capabilities. The field has not, however, been without controversy. Indeed, dialogic strategies may be challenging to realize in educational practice given limited time and other pressures. It has also been acknowledged that forms of cultural imperialism may be encouraged through the implementation of a dialogic approach.

== Notable authors ==
- Robin Alexander
- Mikhail Bakhtin
- Karen Barad
- Jerome Bruner
- Martin Buber
- Jacques Derrida
- John Dewey
- Paulo Freire
- Antonio Gramsci
- Jürgen Habermas
- William James
- Julia Kristeva
- Matthew Lipman
- George Herbert Mead
- Maurice Merleau-Ponty
- Neil Mercer
- Michael Oakeshott
- Jean Piaget
- Charles Sanders Peirce
- Plato
- Lev Vygotsky
- Rupert Wegerif

== See also ==
- Dialogic
- Dialectic process vs. dialogic process
- Dialogical analysis
- Dialogical self
- Heteroglossia
- Intertextuality
- Learning theory (education)
- Pedagogy
- Relational dialectics

== Bibliography ==
- Aubert, A., Flecha, A., García, C., Flecha, R., y Racionero, S. (2008). Aprendizaje dialógico en la sociedad de la información. Barcelona: Hipatia Editorial.
- Freire, P. (1997). Pedagogy of the Heart. New York: Continuum (O.V. 1995).
- Mead, G.H. (1934). Mind, self & society. Chicago: University of Chicago Press.
- Searle J., & Soler M. (2004). Lenguaje y Ciencias Sociales. Diálogo entre John Searle y CREA. Barcelona: El Roure Ciencia.
- Sen, A. (2005) The argumentative Indian: Writings on Indian history, culture and identity. New York: Farrar, Straus and Giroux.
