= Gidden =

Gidden is a surname. Notable people with the surname include:

- Mick Gidden (1910–1961), British Lieutenant Commander
- Vanessa Gidden (born 1985), Jamaican basketball player

== See also ==
- Giddens
