= Jesús Gómez Alonso =

Jesús Javier Gómez Alonso (1952–2006), whose nickname is Pato, was a professor in the Department of Methods of Research and Diagnosis in Education at the University of Barcelona, and a researcher in the Centre of Research in Theories and Practices that Overcome Inequalities (CREA).

Among his scientific contributions, it is worth to mention his dedication to the development of the critical communicative methodology, as well as his research and social action with the Romani people. He was also a key contributor to the development of the transformative educational project called Learning Communities. But his main academic contribution was the development of the research line on preventive socialization of gender violence, with the ultimate aim of eliminating gender violence in society.

Jesús Gómez was the founder and president of the Ujaranza foundation, now called Jesus Gómez Foundation. In addition, his theoretical analysis of love constitutes one of the bases of the work on the prevention of gender violence carried out by SAFO, the Women’s Group at CREA work on the prevention of gender violence.

== Biography ==
Gómez was born in Bilbao. He enrolled in the clandestine movement against Franco's dictatorship, together with his friends Ramon Flecha and Iñaki Santacruz. In 1972, the three of them were expelled from an exclusive Business School in Bilbao due to their involvement in the democratic movements. Afterward, they moved to Barcelona. During the political transition, Gómez was a member of the anarchist trade union CNT (Confederación Nacional del Trabajo), and was the representative of the workers of the hospital where he was an administrative. There, he led a movement for the transformation of the hospital into a public health institution.

In 1992, after working in several companies, he became a professor at the University of Barcelona. He met his wife, the feminist scholar Lídia Puigvert, and established a close friendship with Paulo Freire. He also made friends like Donaldo Macedo, Nita Freire, Basil Bernstein, Henry Giroux, Henry Levin, Ulrich Beck, Joe L. Kincheloe, Shirley R. Steinberg and Peter McLaren.

In 2003, Gómez received lung cancer. It was quickly discovered and removed. Gómez’s research program on preventive socialization of gender violence and, overall, his scientific work on love was key for SAFO, the women’s studies group at CREA, to develop its research line on the prevention of gender violence. Gomez’s support to SAFO for pursuing a line of research on gender violence has caused continuous attacks to Gómez himself, CREA (The Centre of Research in Theories and Practices that Overcome Inequalities) and to other members of CREA. According to the Gómez Foundation, given the continuous attacks, Gómez could not have the peace he needed for his recovery. Even when an international campaign of solidarity with CREA was organized, the attacks did not stop. A metastasis in the liver led to his death on August 8, 2006 in Barcelona.

== Academic contributions ==
The study and scientific developments carried out by Jesús Gómez are reflected in an extensive literature. Among that literature is the book “El amor en la Sociedad del Riesgo” (2004), where Jesus’ theory about love is presented and the book “Metodología Comunicativa Crítica” (2006) centred on his key contribution on the communicative methodology of research.

Jesús Gómez’s analysis of love (Gómez, 2004) constitutes a crucial contribution to our society. The novelty of his analysis lies in the scientific approach to the study of love and the depth with which such study is conducted. Different authors have seen love as something superstitious and trivial, without a scientific basis. Pato argues that love is a social phenomenon that can be explained scientifically. He has questioned things like the values held by those who are considered attractive, shedding light on questions such as: Who is considered attractive?, Who is not? Who is chosen to have a relationship? and Who is not? Jesús Gómez sees the answers to these questions as very important ones, since depending on the person to whom one feels attraction and chooses to have a love story with, one will have either a happy or an unfortunate life. Jesús Gómez, collects ideas from authors such as Jon Elster and Jürgen Habermas, among others, stating in his book that the best form of making such good election is through intersubjectivity, where dialogue allows reaching consensus and establishing the best option. Jesús Gómez also sees communication as a tool for making the best choices, because it helps to interpret the thoughts, feelings, and desires that each person makes explicit.

Jesús Gómez has noticed that, historically, our society has a strong internalization of a certain model of attraction characterized by the attraction toward violence, phenomenon that needs to be changed to stop gender violence. This change can occur through a process of resocialization. He defines two different models of relationships, traditional and alternative. Two types of relationships both taking part of the traditional model: either passion without love (with possible attraction toward violence- “torture”) or a stable relationship with love but without passion. He argues the need to promote an alternative model of relationships in which tenderness and excitement, friendship and passion, and stability and madness are perfectly compatible in the same person. However, for this to happen, a process of resocialization is necessary. Jesús Gómez warns that changing the traditional model of relationships that has been so deeply rooted in society for many years is hard but, at the same time, he states that by means of public debates, through social interactions, it is possible to change the way people relate to each other.

His theoretical contributions have been emphasized by several recognized publications. For instance, it is worth to highlight the article that the International Journal Violence Against Women has dedicated to Jesús Gómez. Also, it is important to mention the fact that the International Journal of Critical Pedagogy dedicated its complete first issue (Vol 1, No 1-2008) to “Pato”.

== Publications ==
Some of his publications are:

- Flecha, R.; Gómez, J. & Puigvert, L. (2003): Contemporary Sociological Theory. New York: Peter Lang, also available in Spanish.
- Gomez, J. & Vargas, J. (2003). Why Romà do not like mainstream schools: Voices of a people without territory. Harvard Educational Review, 73, 4, 559- 590.
- Gómez, J. (2002). Learning Communities when learning in common means school success for all. Multicultural Teaching, 20, 2, 13- 17.
- Gómez, J. (2004). El amor en la sociedad del riesgo. Una tentativa educativa. Barcelona: El Roure. Available in English - Love in Risk Society (in press).
- Gómez, J. et al. (2006). Metodología comunicativa crítica . Barcelona: El Roure. Available in English - Communicative Methodology of Research (in press).
- Gómez, J. (2014). Radical Love. A Revolution for the 21st Century. New York: Peter Lang Publishing.
