= Neil Mercer =

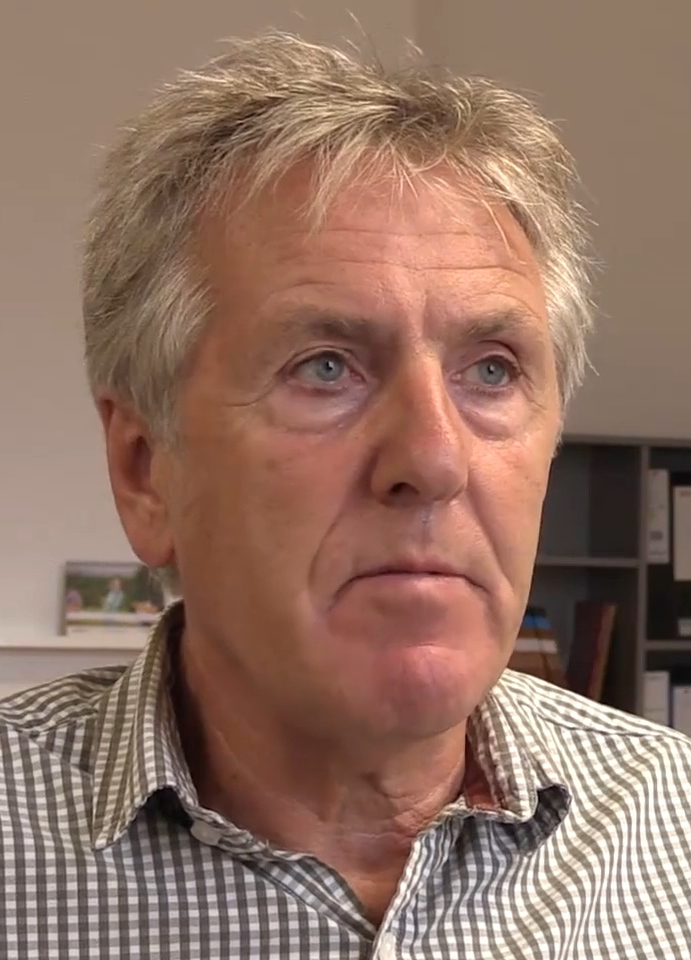
- Neil Mercer in 2017
- Born: Neil McKay Mercer
- Education: Cockermouth Grammar School
- Alma mater: University of Manchester (BSc); University of Leicester (PhD)
- Scientific career
- Fields: Oracy; Educational psychology
- Workplaces: Open University; University of Cambridge
- Thesis: Psychological limitations on the production of speech (1973)
- Doctoral advisor: Ann Taylor Davies
- Website: faculty.educ.cam.ac.uk/people/staff/mercer

Neil McKay Mercer is an Emeritus Professor of Education at the University of Cambridge.

== Education and early life ==
Mercer grew up in Cockermouth in Cumbria, and was educated at Cockermouth Grammar School before studying for a Bachelor of Science (BSc) degree in psychology at the University of Manchester. He was awarded a PhD in psycholinguistics by the University of Leicester in 1973.

== Career and research ==
Mercer's research explores the role of oracy and dialogue in education and the development of children's reasoning. He served as director of the study Centre Oracy Cambridge and is a life fellow of Hughes Hall, Cambridge. Prior to working at the University of Cambridge, he served as director of the Centre for Research in Education and Educational Technologies (CREET) at the Open University. and a member of the Centre for Language and Communications. Mercer previously served as co-editor of the journal Learning, Culture and Social Interaction, editor of the journal Learning and Instruction and the International Journal of Educational Research.

Mercer has emphasised the use of language to "inter-think" and build "common knowledge" – shared understandings and perspectives to work together, particularly in classrooms. From Common Knowledge onwards his work has been explicitly Vygotskian, fitting into a wider sociocultural and dialogic learning focus in education. However, in contrast to Lev Vygotsky's zone of proximal development, Mercer proposes we consider the 'intermental development zone' – the space that language creates which allows peers to interact and develop their reasoning together, in the absence of a guiding teacher. This work is cited as important in development of understanding of language for learning.

Mercer's key interest is in the quality of talk and its impact on educational outcomes, including talk in the home for example, arguing that "'social interaction and collaborative activity' in class can provide 'valuable opportunities' for learning" and that classroom talk should be oriented around co-operation rather than competitiveness, to encourage exploratory talk rather than disputational where the former focuses on explaining ideas, listening to others, and the building of mutual understanding and the latter on a lack of constructive argument which is characterised by disagreement with little explanation. Research exploring this typology and its third component – cumulative talk, in which ideas are shared but not built upon or critically analysed – has found "evidence of the link between the development of children's communication skills and improvements in their critical thinking.", leading to the suggestion that there should be more focus on these skills in classrooms, and commensurately teacher education programs, including in the context of computer use. This approach has been called Thinking Together. This approach has been used internationally particularly in Mexico and recently Chile. Mercer's research into the educationally salient components of discourse has been grounded in 'sociocultural discourse analysis' – a theory to which he has contributed. Sociocultural discourse analysis focuses on what language is used to do, and in Mercer's work, how it is used to share meaning, create common knowledge, and interthink.
