= Giddens =

Giddens is both a surname and a given name. Notable people with the name include:

== Surname ==
- Anthony Giddens, Baron Giddens (born 1938), British sociologist
- George Giddens (disambiguation), multiple people
- J. R. Giddens (born 1985), American basketball player
- Kiel Giddens, Canadian politician
- Rhiannon Giddens (born 1977), American folk musician and songwriter

== Given name ==
- Giddens Ko (born 1978), Taiwanese writer

== See also ==
- Gidden
- Gary Giddins (born 1948), American writer and jazz critic
