= Cockermouth School =

School in Cumbria, UK

Location
- Cockermouth; Castlegate Drive, Cumbria, CA13 9HF; England
- Coordinates: 54.66755°N 3.35094°W

Information
- Type: Academy
- Local authority: Cumberland Council
- Department for Education URN: 142306 Tables
- Ofsted: Reports
- Head teacher: Richard King
- Gender: Coeducational
- Age: 11 to 18
- Website: http://www.cockermouthschool.org/

Cockermouth School is a coeducational secondary school and sixth form located in Cockermouth in the English county of Cumbria.

Previously a community school administered by Cumbria County Council, Cockermouth School converted to academy status in September 2015. However the school continues to coordinate with Cumberland Council for admissions.

== History ==
In 1984, Derwent School and Cockermouth Grammar School merged to become Cockermouth School, a comprehensive school operating on two sites. In 1991, the former Derwent School site was expanded to accommodate all students. In 2023 the School was found to have potentially unsound reinforced autoclaved aerated concrete in the library and the school sports hall.

== Programmes of Study ==
Cockermouth School offers GCSEs and BTECs as programmes of study for pupils, while students in the sixth form have the option to study from a range of A-levels and further BTECs.

== We Will initiative ==
The school is co-operating and following the advice given by the students in the 'We Will' initiative. These were youngsters who were failed by the local CAMHS services, who gathered together in 2018, researched the issues and started lobbying to have them addressed.

== Notable former pupils ==
- Luke Greenbank, swimmer
- Ven Catherine Pickford, Archdeacon of Northolt
- Ben Stokes, cricketer, all-rounder for Durham and England – Test Captain
- James Trafford, professional footballer

=== Cockermouth Grammar School ===
- Christine Alderson, film producer
- Sir David Carter (surgeon), Chief Medical Officer for Scotland from 1996–2000
- Neil Mercer, Professor of Education at the University of Cambridge
