= Hubert Hermans =

Dutch psychologist

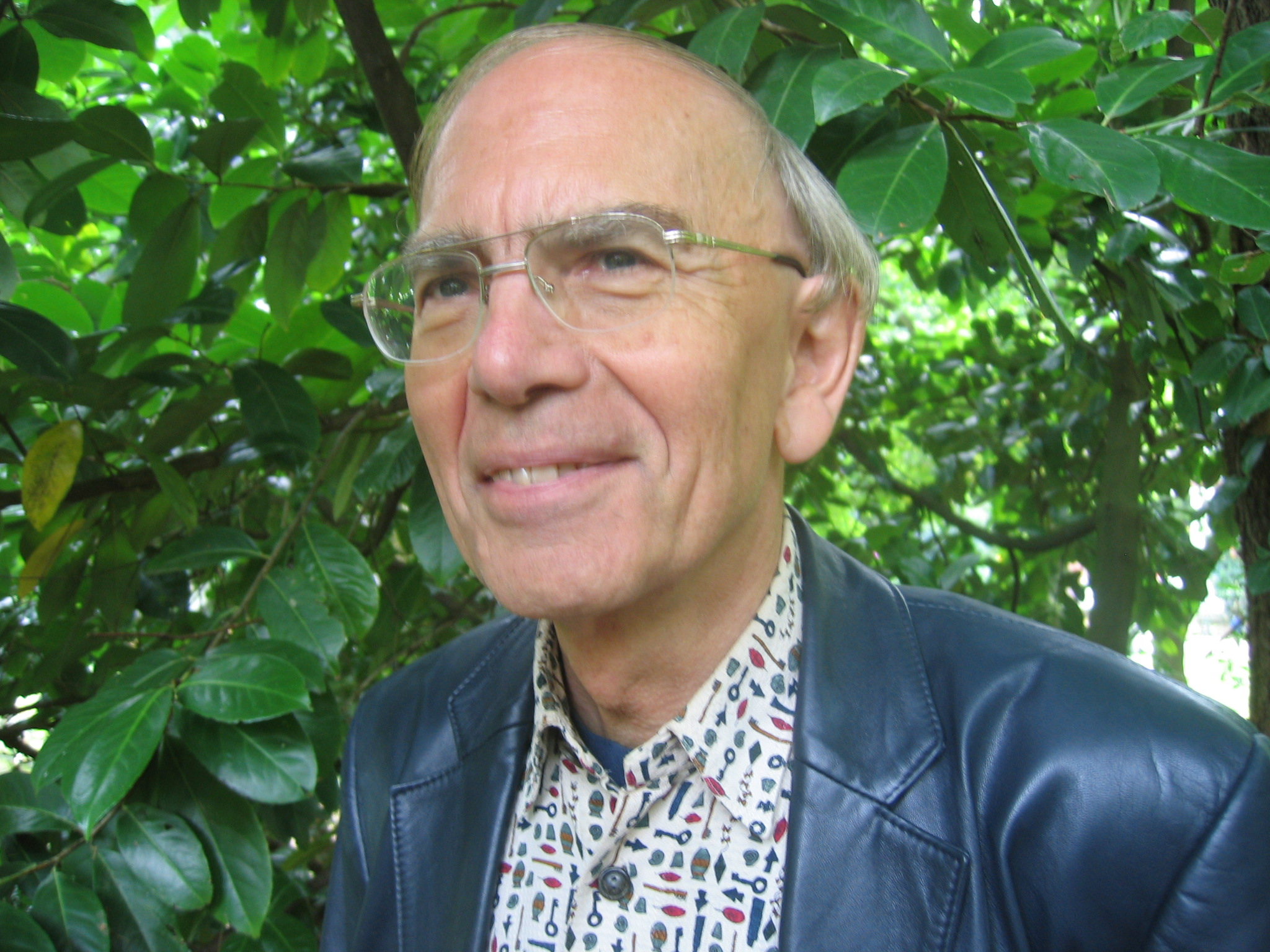
Hubert Hermans

Hubert J.M. Hermans (born October 9, 1937) is a Dutch psychologist and Emeritus Professor at the Radboud University of Nijmegen, internationally known as the creator of dialogical self theory.

== Biography ==
Hermans was born as son of a baker family in Maastricht, The Netherlands. He studied psychology at the Radboud University Nijmegen, where he became staff member at the psychological laboratory of the same university in 1965.

In 1973 he became associate professor of psychology at the University of Nijmegen and in 1980 full professor at the same university. From 2002 till 2018 he was president of the International Society for Dialogical Science (ISDS) and since 2019 he is editor of the section Dialogical Self Theory of Journal of Constructivist Psychology. For his merits for the Dutch society, he was appointed as Ridder in de Orde van de Nederlandse Leeuw (Knight in the Society of the Netherlands Lion) in 2002. His 2006 Dutch book Dialoog en Misverstand (Dialogue and Misunderstanding) was used in the preparation of the Dutch government in 2007. He is honorary associate of the TAOS Institute (from 2012). In 2017 he was elected as foreign member of the Royal Flemish Academy of Belgium for Sciences and the Art.

From 1961-2007 Hubert Hermans was married to Els Hermans-Jansen, a psychotherapist, with whom he cooperated in the development of the Self-Confrontation Method (SCM). The couple has two children and two grandchildren. From 2008-2013 he was married to Agnieszka Hermans-Konopka, who wrote a dissertation (Warsaw, 2006) on the relationship between self and emotions. The couple continues to cooperate on the further development of Dialogical Self Theory in the International Institute for the Dialogical Self (IIDS).

== Work ==
Hermans is considered a key figure in narrative psychology. His dissertation (1967) was on Motivation and achievement and resulted in two psychological tests: The Achievement Motivation Test for adults (1968; published in English in 1971; and in German in 1976) and The Achievement Motivation Test for children (1971; published in German in 1976). Both test belong since then to the most frequently used psychological tests in the Netherlands.

As a reaction to the static and impersonal nature of psychological tests, he developed a Self-Confrontation Method (SCM; 1974; book published in English in 1995). Application of this method in practice led to the establishment of the Dutch Association for SCM Consultants that counted around 260 members in 2013.

In the 1990s he developed the dialogical self theory, inspired by the American pragmatism of William James and the dialogical school of the Russian literary scholar Mikhail Bakhtin.

=== Dialogical self theory ===
Hermans's, basing on ideas of M.M. Bakhtin, W. James, purpose is to contribute to research and development of dialogical relationships, not only between individuals, groups, and cultures, but also between different I-positions within the dialogical self of the individual person. He does so in the conviction that dialogical relationships between individuals, groups, and cultures cannot exist in separation of productive dialogical relationships which individuals develop with themselves.

On the basis of this purpose, bi-annual International Conferences on the Dialogical Self are organized: in Nijmegen (2000), Ghent, Belgium (2004); Warsaw, Poland (2004), Braga, Portugal (2006), Cambridge, United Kingdom (2008), Athens, Greece (2010), Athens, Georgia, USA (2012), The Hague, The Netherlands (2014), Braga, Portugal (2016), Lublin, Poland (2018), Barcelona, Spain (2021), and Tallinn, Estonia (2023).

From 2006 till 2018 Hermans was chief editor of the International Journal for Dialogical Science (IJDS). Since 2018 he is editor of the Dialogical Self Theory section of the Journal of Constructivist Psychology. A number of his publications have been translated into English, Spanish, Portuguese, Italian, German, Polish, Russian and Japanese.

== Bibliography ==
Books

- Hermans, H.J.M., & Kempen, H.J.G. (1993). The dialogical self: Meaning as movement. San Diego: Academic Press. ISBN 0-12-342320-1.
- Hermans, H.J.M., & Hermans-Jansen, E. (1995). Self-narratives: The construction of meaning in psychotherapy. New York: Guilford Press. ISBN 0-89862-878-4.
- Hermans, H.J.M., & Dimaggio, G. (Eds) (2004). The dialogical self in psychotherapy. New York: Brunner & Routledge. ISBN 1-58391-855-8.
- Oles, P.K., & Hermans, H.J.M. (Eds.) (2005). The dialogical self: Theory and research. Lublin, Poland: Wydawnictwo. ISBN 83-7363-320-0.
- Hermans, H.J.M., & Hermans-Konopka A. (Eds.) (2010). Dialogical self theory. Positioning and Counter-Positioning in a Globalizing Society Cambridge University Press ISBN 978-0-521-76526-8
- Hermans, H.J.M., & Gieser, T. (Eds.) (2012). Handbook of Dialogical Self Theory. Cambridge, UK: Cambridge University Press. ISBN 978-1-107-00651-5.
- Hermans, H.J.M. (2012). Between dreaming and recognition seeking: The emergence of dialogical self theory. Lanham: Maryland: University Press of America. ISBN 978-0-7618-5887-4.
- Hermans, H.J.M. (2018). Society in the self: A theory of identity in democracy. Oxford, UK: Oxford University Press ISBN 978-0-190-68779-3
- Hermans, H.J.M. (2022). Liberation in the face of uncertainty: A new development in Dialogical Self Theory. Cambridge, UK: Cambridge University Press. ISBN 978-1-108-84440-6.

Articles and chapters

- Hermans, H. J. M. (1970). A questionnaire measure of achievement motivation. Journal of Applied Psychology, 54, 353-363.
- Hermans, H. J. M. (1987). The dream in the process of valuation: A method of interpretation. Journal of Personality and Social Psychology, 53, 163-175.
- Hermans, H.J.M., Kempen, H.J.G., & Van Loon, R. (1992). The dialogical self: Beyond individualism and rationalism. American Psychologist, 47, 23-33.
- Hermans, H.J.M. (1996). Voicing the self: From information processing to dialogical interchange. Psychological Bulletin, 119, 31-50.
- Hermans, H.J.M., & Kempen, H.J.G. (1998). Moving Cultures: The Perilous Problems of Cultural Dichotomies in a Globalizing Society. American Psychologist, 53, 1111-1120.
- Hermans, H.J.M. (2002). The person as a motivated storyteller: Valuation theory and the Self-Confrontation Method. In R.A. Neimeyer, & G.J. Neimeyer (Eds.) Advances in Personal Construct Psychology (pp. 3–38).
- Hermans, H.J.M. & Dimaggio, G. (2007), Self, identity, and globalization in times of uncertainty: A dialogical analysis. Review of General Psychology, 11, 31-61.
- Hermans, H.J.M. (2012). Dialogical Self Theory and the increasing multiplicity of I-positions in a globalizing society: Introduction. New Directions for Child and Adolescent Development (NDCAD), 137, 1-21.
- Hermans, H.J.M. (2013). The dialogical self in education. Journal of Constructivist Psychology, 26, 81-89.
- Hermans, H.J.M. (2011). The dialogical self: A process of positioning in space and time. In: S. Gallagher (Ed.). The Oxford Handbook of the Self (pp. 654–680). Oxford, UK: Oxford University Press.

== Bibliography about Hubert Hermans's work ==
- Culture & Psychology (2001). Special issue: Culture & the dialogical Self. Vol. 7, no. 3, 243-408.
- Theory & Psychology (2002). Special issue: the dialogical self, vol. 12, no. 2, 147-280.
- Journal of Constructivist Psychology (2003). Special issue on the dialogical self. Vol. 16, no.2, 89-213.
- Identity: An international Journal of theory and research (2004). Mediated identity in the emerging digital age: A dialogical perspective. Vol. 4, no. 4, 297-405.
- Counselling Psychology Quarterly (2006). Special issue: The dialogical approach to counselling theory, research, and practice, vol. 19, no. 1, 1-120.
- Van Belzen, J.A. (2006). Culture and the ‘dialogical self’: Toward a secular cultural psychology of religion. In: J. Straub, D. Weidemann, C. Kolbl, & B. Zielke (Eds.). Pursuit of meaning: Advances in cultural and cross-cultural psychology (pp. 129–152). New Brunswick, N.J.: Transaction Publishers.
- Journal of Constructivist Psychology (2008), special issue: research on the dialogical self, vol. 21, no. 3, 185-269.
- Studia Psychologica (2008), special issue on dialogical self research, vol 6, no.8, 5-253.
- Theory & Psychology (2010), special issue on self and dialogue, vol. 20, no. 3, 2010, 299-360.
- New Directions for Child and Adolescent Development (2012), special issue on dialogical self and development, no. 137, 2012, 1-77.
- Journal of Constructivist Psychology (2013), special issue on the dialogical self in education, vol. 26, no. 2, 81-89.
- Bertau, M-C., Goncalves, M.M., & Raggatt, P. (Eds.) (2012). Dialogic formations: Investigations into the origins and development of the dialogical self. Charlotte, NC.: Information Age Publishing. ISBN 978-1-62396-037-7.
- Buitelaar, M., & Zock, H. (2013). Religious voices in self-narratives. Berlin, Germany: De Gruyter. ISBN 978-1-61451-219-6.
- Jones, R.A., & Morioka, M. (Eds.) (2011). Jungian and dialogical self perspectives. London, UK: Palgrave Macmillan. ISBN 978-0-230-28579-8.
- Lengelle, R. (2021). Portrait of a scientist: in conversation with Hubert Hermans, founder of Dialogical Self Theory. British Journal of Guidance & Counselling, published online, April 2.
