= Dialogical self =

The mind's ability to imagine different positions of participants in an internal dialogue

The dialogical self is a psychological concept which describes the mind's ability to imagine the different positions of participants in an internal dialogue, in close connection with external dialogue. The "dialogical self" is the central concept in the dialogical self theory (DST), as created and developed by the Dutch psychologist Hubert Hermans since the 1990s.

== Overview ==
Dialogical Self Theory (DST) weaves two concepts, self and dialogue, together in such a way that a more profound understanding of the interconnection of self and society is achieved. Usually, the concept of self refers to something "internal," something that takes place within the mind of the individual person, while dialogue is typically associated with something "external," that is, processes that take place between people involved in communication.

The composite concept "dialogical self" goes beyond the self-other dichotomy by infusing the external to the internal and, in reverse, to introduce the internal into the external. As functioning as a "society of mind", the self is populated by a multiplicity of "self-positions" that have the possibility to entertain dialogical relationships with each other.

In Dialogical Self Theory (DST) the self is considered as "extended," that is, individuals and groups in the society at large are incorporated as positions in the mini-society of the self. As a result of this extension, the self does not only include internal positions (e.g., I as the son of my mother, I as a teacher, I as a lover of jazz), but also external positions (e.g., my father, my pupils, the groups to which I belong).

Given the basic assumption of the extended self, the other is not simply outside the self but rather an intrinsic part of it. There is not only the actual other outside the self, but also the imagined other who is entrenched as the other-in-the-self. An important theoretical implication is that basic processes, like self-conflicts, self-criticism, self-agreements, and self-consultancy, are taking place in different domains in the self: within the internal domain (e.g., "As an enjoyer of life I disagree with myself as an ambitious worker"); between the internal and external (extended) domain (e.g., "I want to do this but the voice of my mother in myself criticizes me") and within the external domain (e.g., "The way my colleagues interact with each other has led me to decide for another job").

As these examples show, there is not always a sharp separation between the inside of the self and the outside world, but rather a gradual transition. DST assumes that the self as a society of mind is populated by internal and external self-positions. When some positions in the self silence or suppress other positions, monological relationships prevail. When, in contrast, positions are recognized and accepted in their differences and alterity (both within and between the internal and external domains of the self), dialogical relationships emerge with the possibility to further develop and renew the self and the other as central parts of the society at large.

== Historical background ==
DST is inspired by two thinkers in particular, William James and Mikhail Bakhtin, who worked in different countries (USA and Russia, respectively), in different disciplines (psychology and literary sciences), and in different theoretical traditions (pragmatism and dialogism). As the composite term dialogical self suggests, the present theory finds itself not exclusively in one of these traditions but explicitly at their intersection. As a theory about the self it is inspired by William James, as a theory about dialogue it elaborates on some insights of Mikhail Bakhtin. The purpose of the present theory is to profit from the insights of founding fathers like William James, George Herbert Mead and Mikhail Bakhtin and, at the same time, to go beyond them.

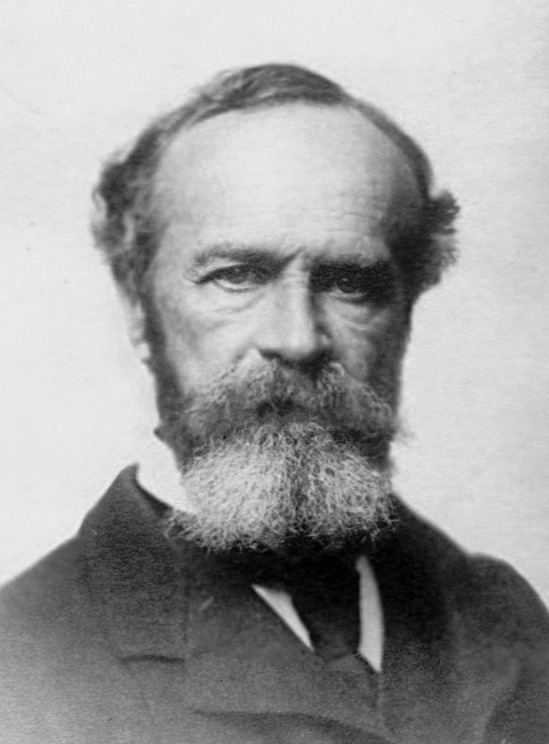
William James (1890) proposed a distinction between the I and the Me.

William James (1890) proposed a distinction between the I and the Me, which, according to Morris Rosenberg, is a classic distinction in the psychology of the self. According to James the I is equated with the self-as-knower and has three features: continuity, distinctness, and volition. The continuity of the self-as-knower is expressed in a sense of personal identity, that is, a sense of sameness through time. A feeling of distinctness from others, or individuality, is also characteristic of the self-as-knower. Finally, a sense of personal volition is reflected in the continuous appropriation and rejection of thoughts by which the self-as-knower manifests itself as an active processor of experience.

Of particular relevance to DST is James's view that the Me, equated with the self-as-known, is composed of the empirical elements considered as belonging to oneself. James was aware that there is a gradual transition between Me and mine and concluded that the empirical self is composed of all that the person can call his or her own, "not only his body and his psychic powers, but his clothes and his house, his wife and children, his ancestors and friends, his reputation and works, his lands and horses, and yacht and bank-account". According to this view, people and things in the environment belong to the self, as far as they are felt as "mine". This means that not only "my mother" belongs to the self but even "my enemy". In this way, James proposed a view in which the self is 'extended' to the environment. This proposal contrasts with a Cartesian view of the self which is based on a dualistic conception, not only between self and body but also between self and other. With his conception of the extended self, that defined as going beyond the skin, James has paved the way for later theoretical developments in which other people and groups, defined as "mine" are part of a dynamic multi-voiced self.

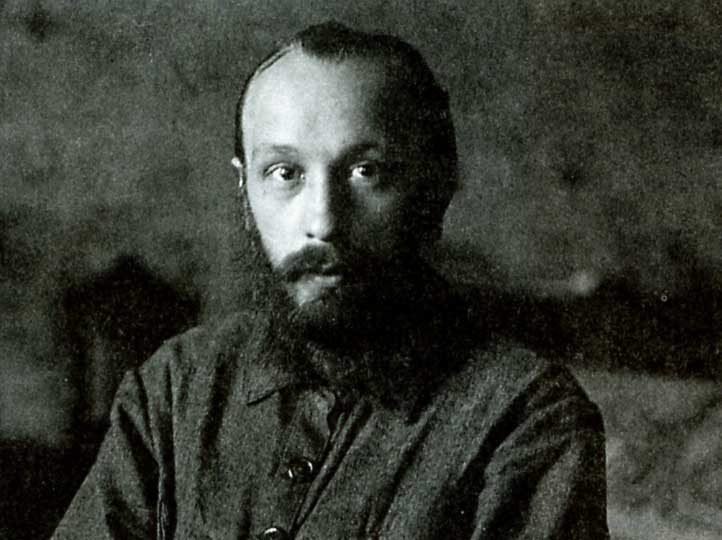
Mikhail Bakhtin (1920)

In the above quotation from William James, we see a constellation of characters (or self-positions) which he sees as belonging to the Me/mine: my wife and children, my ancestors and friends. Such characters are more explicitly elaborated in Mikhail Bakhtin's metaphor of the polyphonic novel, which became a source of inspiration for later dialogical approaches to the self. In proposing this metaphor, he draws on the idea that in Dostoevsky's works there is not a single author at work—Dostoevsky himself—but several authors or thinkers, portrayed as characters such as Ivan Karamazov, Myshkin, Raskolnikov, Stavrogin, and the Grand Inquisitor.

These characters are not presented as obedient slaves in the service of one author-thinker, Dostoevsky, but treated as independent thinkers, each with their own view of the world. Each hero is put forward as the author of his own ideology, and not as the object of Dostoevsky's finalizing artistic vision. Rather than a multiplicity of characters within a unified world, there is a plurality of consciousnesses located in different worlds. As in a polyphonic musical composition, multiple voices accompany and oppose one another in dialogical ways. In bringing together different characters in a polyphonic construction, Dostoevsky creates a multiplicity of perspectives, portraying characters conversing with the Devil (Ivan and the Devil), with their alter egos (Ivan and Smerdyakov), and even with caricatures of themselves (Raskolnikov and Svidrigailov).

Inspired by the original ideas of William James and Mikhail Bakhtin, Hubert Hermans, Harry Kempen and Rens van Loon wrote the first psychological publication on the "dialogical self" in which they conceptualized the self in terms of a dynamic multiplicity of relatively autonomous I-positions in the (extended) landscape of the mind. In this conception, the I has the possibility to move from one spatial position to another in accordance with changes in situation and time. The I fluctuates among different and even opposed positions, and has the capacity to imaginatively endow each position with a voice so that dialogical relations between positions can be established. The voices function like interacting characters in a story, involved in processes of question and answer, agreement and disagreement. Each of them have a story to tell about their own experiences from their own stance. As different voices, these characters exchange information about their respective Me's and mines, resulting in a complex, narratively structured self.

== Construction of assessment and research procedures ==
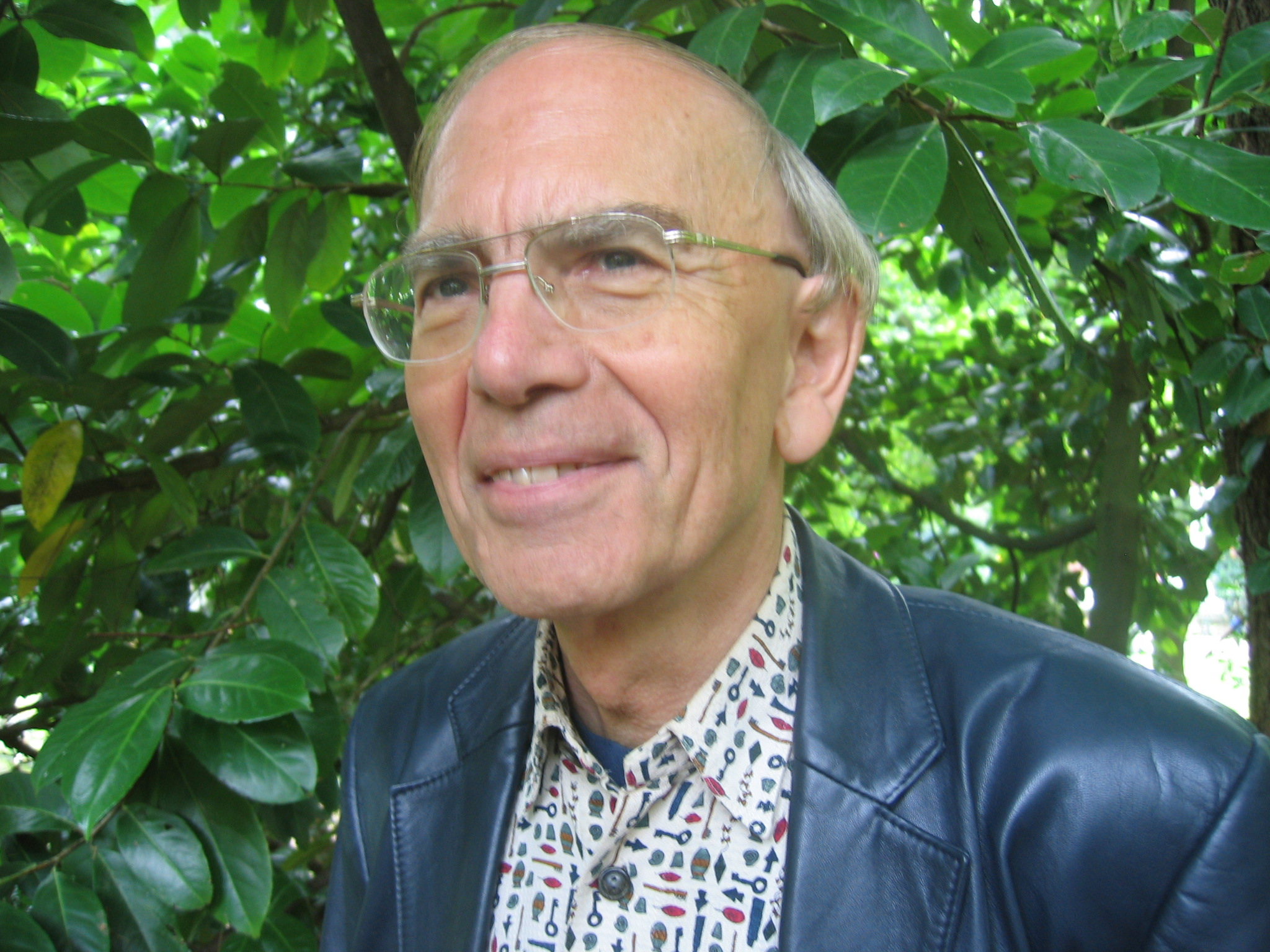
Hubert Hermans wrote the first psychological publication on the "dialogical self" in 1992.

The theory has led to the construction of different assessment and research procedures for investigating central aspects of the dialogical self. Hubert Hermans has constructed the Personal Position Repertoire (PPR) method, an idiographic procedure for assessing the internal and external domains of the self in terms of an organized position repertoire.

This is done by offering the participant a list of internal and external self-positions. The participants mark those positions that they feel as relevant in their lives. They are allowed to add extra internal and external positions to the list and phrase them in their own terms. The relationship between internal and external positions is then established by inviting the participants to fill out a matrix with the rows representing the internal positions and the columns the external positions. In the entries of the matrix, the participant fills in, on a scale from 0 to 5 the extent to which an internal position is prominent in the relation to an external position. The scores in the matrix allow for the calculation of a number of indices, such as sum scores representing the overall prominence of particular internal or external positions and correlations showing the extent to which internal (or external) positions have similar profiles. On the basis of the results of the quantitative analysis, some positions can be selected, by the client or assessor, for closer examination.

From the selected positions the client can tell a story that reflects the specific experiences associated with that position and, moreover, assessor and client can explore which positions can be considered as a dialogical response to one or more other positions. In this way, the method combines both qualitative and quantitative analyses.

=== Psychometric aspects of the PPR method ===
The psychometric aspects of the PPR method was refined a procedure proposed by A. Kluger, Nir, & Y. Kluger. The authors analyze clients' Personal Position Repertoires by creating a bi-plot of the factors underlying their internal and external positions. A bi-plot provides a clear and comprehensible visual map of the relations between all the meaningful internal and external positions within the self in such a way that both types of positions are simultaneously visible. Through this procedure clusters of internal and external positions and dominant patterns can be easily observed and analyzed.

The method allows researchers or practitioners to study the general deep structures of the self. There are multiple bi-plots technologies available today. The simplest approach, however, is to perform a standard principal component analysis (PCA). To obtain a bi-plot, a PCA is once performed on the external positions and once on the internal positions, with the number of components in both PCA's restricted to two. Next, a scatter of the two PCAs is plotted on the same plane, where results of the first components are projected to the X-axis and of the second components to Y-axis. In this way, an overview of the organization of the internal and external positions together is realized.

=== The Personality Web assessment method ===
Another assessment method, the Personality Web, is devised by Raggatt. This semi-structured method starts from the assumption that the self is populated by a number of opposing narrative voices, with each voice having its own life story. Each voice competes with other voices for dominance in thought and action and each is constituted by a different set of affectively-charged attachments, to people, events, objects and one's own body.

The assessment comprises two phases—

- In the first phase, 24 attachments are elicited in four categories: people, events, places and objects, and orientations to body parts. In an interview, the history and meaning of each attachment is explored.
- In the second phase, participants are invited to group their attachments by strength of association into cluster analysis and multidimensional scaling is used to map the individual's web of attachments.

This method represents a combination of qualitative and quantitative procedures that provide insight in the content and organization of a multi-voiced self.

=== Self-Confrontation Method ===
Dialogical relationships are also studied with an adapted version of the Self-Confrontation Method (SCM).

Take the following example. A client, Mary, reported that she sometimes experienced herself as a witch, eager to murder her husband, particularly when he was drunk. She did a self-investigation in two parts, one from her ordinary position as Mary and another from the position of the witch. Then, she told from each of the positions a story about her past, present, and future. These stories were summarized in the form of a number of sentences. It appeared that Mary formulated sentences that were much more acceptable from a societal point of view than those from the witch. Mary formulated sentences like "I want to try to see what my mother gives me: there's only one of me" or "For the first time in my life, I'm engaged in making a home ("home" is also coming at home, entering into myself)", whereas the witch produced statements like "With my bland, pussycat qualities I have vulnerable things in hand, from which I derive power at a later moment (somebody tells me things that I can use so that I get what I want)" or "I enjoy when I have broken him [husband]: from a power position entering the battlefield."

It was found that the sentences of the two positions were very different in content, style, and affective meaning. Moreover, the relationship between Mary and the witch seemed to be more monological than dialogical, that is, either the one or the other was in control of the self and the situation and there was not no exchange between them. After the investigation, Mary received a therapeutic supervision during which she started to keep a diary in which she learned to make fine discriminations between her own experiences as Mary and those of the witch. She became not only aware of the needs of the witch but learned also to give an adequate response as soon as she noticed that the energy of the witch was upcoming. In a second investigation, one year later, the intensely conflicting relationship between Mary and the witch was significantly reduced and, as a result, there was less tension and stress in the self. She reported that in some situations, she even could make good use of the energy of the witch (e.g., when applying for a job). Whereas in some situations she was in control of the witch, in other situations she could even cooperate with her. The changes that took place between investigation 1 and investigation 2 suggested that the initial monological relationship between the two positions changed clearly into a more dialogical direction.

=== The Initial Questionnaire method ===
Under the supervision of the Polish psychologist Piotr Oleś, a group of researchers constructed a questionnaire method, called the Initial Questionnaire, for the measurement of three types of "internal activity" (a) change of perspective, (b) internal monologue and (c) internal dialogue. The purpose of this questionnaire is to induce the subject's self-reflection and determine which I-positions are reflected by the participant's interlocutors and which of them give new and different points of view to the person.

The method includes a list of potential positions. The participants are invited to choose some of them and can add their own to the list. The selected positions, both internal and external ones, are then assessed as belonging to the dialogue, monologue of perspective categories. Such a questionnaire is well-suited for the investigation of correlations with other questionnaires.

For example, correlating the Initial Questionnaire with the Revised NEO Personality Inventory (NEO PI-R), the researchers found that persons having inner dialogues scored significantly lower on Assertiveness and higher on Self-Consciousness, Fantasy, Aesthetics, Feelings and Openness than people having internal monologues. They concluded that "people entering into imaginary dialogues in comparison with ones having mainly monologues are characterized by a more vivid and creative imagination (Fantasy), a deep appreciation of art and beauty (Aesthetics) and receptivity to inner feelings and emotions (Feelings). They are curious about both inner and outer worlds and their lives are experientially richer. They are willing to entertain novel ideas and unconventional values and they experience positive as well as negative emotions more keenly (Openness). At the same time these persons are more disturbed by awkward social situations, uncomfortable around others, sensitive to ridicule, and prone to feelings of inferiority (Self-Consciousness), they prefer to stay in the background and let others do the talking (Assertiveness)".

=== Other methods ===
Other methods are developed in fields related to DST. Based on Stiles' assimilation model, "Osatuke et al.", describes a method that enables the researcher to compare what is said by a client (verbal content) and how it is said (speech sounds). With this method the authors are able to assess to what extent the vocal manifestations (how it is said) of different internal voices of the same client parallel, contradict or complement their written manifestations (what is said). This method can be used to study the non-verbal characteristics of different voices in the self in connection with verbal content.

=== Dialogical sequence analysis ===
On the basis of Mikhail Bakhtin's theory of utterances, Leiman devised a dialogical sequence analysis. This method starts from the assumption that every utterance has an addressee. The central question is: To whom is the person speaking?

Usually, we think of one listener as the immediately observable addressee. However, the addressee is rather a multiplicity of others, a complex web of invisible others, whose presence can be traced in the content, flow and expressive elements of the utterance (e.g., I'm directly addressing you but while speaking I'm protesting to a third person who is invisibly present in the conversation). When there are more than one addressees present in the conversation, the utterance positions the author/speaker into more (metaphorical) locations. Usually, these locations form sequences, that can be examined and made explicit when one listens carefully not only to the content but also the expressive elements in the conversation. Leiman's method, which analyzes a conversation in terms of "chains of dialogical patterns", is theory-guided, qualitative and sensitive to the verbal and the non-verbal aspects of utterances.

== Fields of application ==
It is not the main purpose of the presented theory to formulate testable hypotheses, but to generate new ideas. It is certainly possible to perform theory-guided research on the basis of the theory, as exemplified by a special issue on dialogical self research in the Journal of Constructivist Psychology (2008) and in other publications (further on in the present section). Yet, the primary purpose is the generation of new ideas that lead to continued theory, research, and practice on the basis of links between the central concepts of the theory.

Theoretical advances, empirical research, and practical applications are discussed in the International Journal for Dialogical Science and at the biennial International Conferences on the Dialogical Self as they are held in different countries and continents: Nijmegen, Netherlands (2000), Ghent, Belgium (2002), Warsaw, Poland (2004), Braga, Portugal (2006), Cambridge, United Kingdom (2008), Athens, Greece (2010), Athens, Georgia, United States (2012), and The Hague, Netherlands (2014).The aim of the journal and the conferences is to transcend the boundaries of (sub)disciplines, countries, and continents and create fertile interfaces where theorists, researchers and practitioners meet in order to engage in innovative dialogue.

After initial publication on DST, the theory has been applied in a variety of fields: cultural psychology psychotherapy; personality psychology;psychopathology; developmental psychology; experimental social psychology; autobiography; social work; educational psychology; brain science; Jungian psychoanalysis; history; cultural anthropology; constructivism; social constructionism; philosophy; the psychology of globalization cyberpsychology; media psychology, vocational psychology, and literary sciences.

Fields of applications are also reflected by several special issues that appeared in psychological journals. In Culture & Psychology (2001), DST, as a theory of personal and cultural positioning, was exposed and commented on by researchers from different cultures. In Theory & Psychology (2002), the potential contribution of the theory for a variety of fields was discussed: developmental psychology, personality psychology, psychotherapy, psychopathology, brain sciences, cultural psychology, Jungian psychoanalysis, and semiotic dialogism. A second issue of this journal published in 2010 was also devoted to DST. In the Journal of Constructivist Psychology (2003) researchers and practitioners focused on the implications of the dialogical self for personal construct psychology, on the philosophy of Martin Buber, on the rewriting of narratives in psychotherapy, and on a psycho-dramatic approach in psychotherapy. The topic of mediated dialogue in a global and digital age was at the heart of a special issue in Identity: An International Journal of Theory and Research (2004). In Counselling Psychology Quarterly (2006), the dialogical self was applied to a variety of topics, such as, the relationship between adult attachment and working models of emotion, paranoid personality disorder, narrative impoverishment in schizophrenia, and the significance of social power in psychotherapy. In the Journal of Constructivist Psychology (2008) and in Studia Psychologica (2008), groups of researchers addressed the question of how empirical research can be performed on the basis of DST. The relevance of the dialogical self to developmental psychology was discussed in a special issue of New Directions for Child and Adolescent Development (2012). The application of the dialogical self in educational settings was presented in a special issue of the Journal of Constructivist Psychology (2013).

== Evaluation ==
Since its first inception in 1992, DST is discussed and evaluated, particularly at the biennial International Conferences on the Dialogical Self and in the International Journal for Dialogical Science. Some of the main positive evaluations and main criticisms are summarized here. On the positive side, many researchers appreciate the breadth and the integrative character of the theory. As the above review of applications demonstrates, there is a broad range of fields in psychology and other disciplines in which the theory has received interests from thinkers, researchers and practitioners. The breadth of interest is also reflected by the range of scientific journals that have devoted special issues to the theory and its implications.

The theory has the potential to bring together scientists and practitioners from a variety of countries, continents and cultures. The Fifth International Conference on the Dialogical Self in Cambridge, United Kingdom attracted 300 participants from 43 countries. The conference focused primarily on DST, and dialogism as a related field. However, by focusing on dialogue, dialogical self goes beyond the post-modernism idea of the decentralization of the self and the notion of fragmentation. Recent work by John Rowan has resulted in the publication of a book by him entitled - 'Personification: Using the Dialogical Self in Psychotherapy and Counselling' published by Routledge. The book shows how to apply the concepts by those working in the therapeutic field.

=== Criticism ===
The theory and its applications have also received several criticism. Many researchers have noted a discrepancy between theory and research. Certainly, more than most post-modernist approaches, the theory has instigated a variety of empirical studies and some of its main tenets are confirmed in experimental social-psychological research. Yet, the gap between theory and research still exists.

Closely related to this gap, there is the lack of connection between dialogical self research and mainstream psychology. Although the theory and its applications have been published in mainstream journals like Psychological Bulletin and the American Psychologist, it has not yet led to the adoption of the theory as a significant development in mainstream (American) psychology. Apart from the theory-research gap, one of the additional reasons for the lacking connection with mainstream research may be the fact that interest in the notion of dialogue, central in the history of philosophy since Plato, is largely neglected in psychology and other social sciences. Another disadvantage of the theory is that it lacks a research procedure that is sufficiently common to allow for the exchange of research data among investigators. Although different research tools have been developed (see the above review of assessment and research methods), none of them are used by a majority of researchers in the field.

Investigators often use different research tools which lead to a considerable richness of information but, at the same time, create a stumbling block for the comparison of research data. It seems that the breadth of the theory and the richness of its applications have a shadowy side in the relative isolation of research in the DST subfields. Other researchers find the scientific work done thus far to be of a too verbal nature. While the theory explicitly acknowledges the importance of pre-linguistic, non-linguistic forms of dialogue, the actual research is typically taking place on the verbal level with the simultaneous neglect of the non-verbal level (for a notable exception cultural-anthropological research on shape-shifting). Finally, some researchers would like to see more emphasis on the bodily aspects of dialogue. Up till now the theory has focused almost exclusively on the transcendence of the self-other dualism, as typical of the modern model of the self. More work should be done on the embodied nature of the dialogical self (for the role of the body in connection with emotions).

== See also ==
- Dialectic process vs. dialogic process
- Dialogical analysis
- Egalitarian dialogue
- Internal discourse
- Philosophy of dialogue
