= Egalitarian dialogue =

Organisational communication strategy

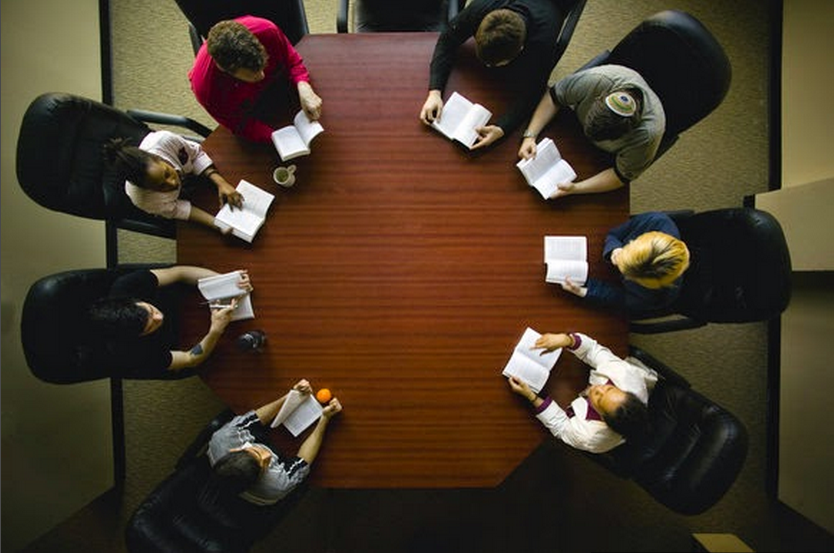
An egalitarian dialogue at Shimer College

Egalitarian dialogue is a dialogue in which contributions are considered according to the validity of their reasoning, instead of according to the status or position of power of those who make them. Although previously used widely in the social sciences and in reference to the Bakhtinian philosophy of dialogue, it was first systematically applied to dialogical education by Ramón Flecha in his 2000 work Sharing Words. Theory and Practice of Dialogic Learning.

Egalitarian dialogue is one of the seven principles of dialogic learning (Flecha, 2000), the others being cultural intelligence, equality of differences, creation of meaning, instrumental dimension, solidarity, and transformation. The principle of egalitarian dialogue is deeply interrelated with the other principles of dialogic learning. By recognizing all people's cultural intelligence and respecting differences from an egalitarian standpoint, egalitarian dialogue encourages individuals to create meaning, develop solidarity among different people, and create new instrumental dimensions. This interdependence among the principles of dialogic learning favors constant social transformation.

== Equality of differences ==
The recognition and respect of different types of knowledge raises the awareness that each person has something to share, something different and equally important. Therefore, the wider the diversity of voices engaged in egalitarian dialogue, the better the knowledge that can be dialogically constructed. In this sense, dialogic learning is oriented towards equality of differences, stating that true equality includes the right to live in a different way (Flecha, 2000). This perspective, which Paulo Freire (1997) calls unity in diversity, never defends diversity or difference without simultaneously proposing equality and fairness toward different individual and groups.

Equality of differences is also enacted in the Learning Communities (Valls, 2000; Elboj et al., 2001). The Learning Communities are schools in Spain, Brazil and Chile that have undergone a process of educational and social transformation based on dialogic learning. In the learning communities, the equality of differences principle is shown, among other practices, in the interactive groups (Aubert et al., 2004), where students and adults who have different levels of instruction and are from different backgrounds, teach and learn from each other. Those interactions create Zone of Proximal Development (Vygotsky, 1978), this showing that meaning-making and learning do not depend solely on the intervention of professionals, but on all the knowledge brought by anyone related to the students (Flecha, 2000).

== Creation of meaning ==
Habermas (2004a, 2004b) has stressed the need to recover the lifeworld from its systemic colonization by the “steering media” of power, law and bureaucratization. The systemic decolonization is a way of reinventing democracy in public spaces and institutions and for recovering meaning. Habermas' concept of lifeworld refers to the everyday contexts where people relate to each other and create meaning and structures to organize themselves. In Habermas' view, and also from a dialogic learning perspective, subjects create meaning through intersubjectivity or the interaction among subjects engaged in egalitarian dialogue.

Any person can engage in such meaning making dialogue because humans have epistemological curiosity, which when expressed in egalitarian dialogue can criticize and end with what Freire (2001) called the bureaucratizing of the mind, an invisible power of alienating domestication. Such debureaucratization process can be seen in Dialogic Musical Gatherings (CONFAPEA, 2005), where people develop their epistemological curiosity listening to classical music and later engaging in a dialogue about the instruments that were playing, about the composer, his life and his position in a historical context, the style of the music listened to and its relationship with the cultural claims of each participant belonging to the Music Gathering, etc. In this process, meaning is created and recovered because music escapes the system and goes back to people's lifeworld tearing down the walls of cultural elitism.

== Instrumental dimension ==
The Instrumental Dimension of learning, as a principle of dialogic learning, should not be confused with instrumentality or the technocratic colonization of learning. In dialogic learning, as in Habermas (1984), the instrumental and communicative rationality are not opposed to each other, but instrumental learning becomes more intense and profound when situated in an adequate dialogical framework. The ability to select and process information is the cognitive tool that best enables one to function confidently in today's society. Dialogue and reflection encourage the development of that ability. Relationships with other people put not only diverse information but also its selection and processing at our disposal (Flecha, 2000, p. 16). In addition, "when dialogue is egalitarian, it encourages intense reflection, since people need to understand other positions and express their own" (Flecha, 2000, p. 16). In this sense, in egalitarian dialogue, procedures and ends are dialogically agreed. Those work for purposes of understanding, and do not let interactants hide themselves behind means that obscure exclusionary interests.

In education without dialogue, every single item becomes a target for power claims, even methods and instruments for learning, and therefore, the bureaucratization of those elements is inevitable. For this reason, the instrumental dimension of dialogic learning is never purely instrumental. It is also ethical, respectful, characterized by a sense of solidarity that contributes to break up the existing educational structure.

== Solidarity ==
Solidarity feeds dialogue, but at the same time, egalitarian dialogue, as essential communication, must underlie any act of solidarity (Freire, 1970). That is why, "egalitarian educational practices must be grounded in conceptions of solidarity" (Flecha, 2000, p. 20).

The emphasis of dialogic learning on solidarity as the wheel that drives this perspective on education can be evidenced in the Learning Communities. For instance, in the School for Adults La Verneda-Sant Martí (Sánchez, 1999; Flecha, 2000) all the activities are open to anyone from the community and the city, and are also deeply integrated in the neighborhood. Because of discussing books from the classic literature through dialogic learning, the dialogic literary gatherings help improve the lives of the participants in the gathering but also of other people in the school and the neighborhood, when for example some participants in the gathering take part of different committees of the school that plan actions of social transformation in the neighborhood, the city and beyond.

In this sense, solidarity is not only understood as an act for identifying and denouncing problems, but also as means to solve them. Solidarity does not only imply denouncing the process of dehumanization, but also announcing the dream of a new society (Freire, 2001). In this regard, solidarity goes beyond rebellious attitudes that do not propose an alternative, and reaches a more radically critical and dialogical position that implies the transformation of oneself, institutions, and the world.
