= Mick Gidden =

British Lieutenant Commander during World War II

Lieutenant Commander Mick Gidden GC OBE GM
- Born: 15 March 1910; Hampstead, London, England
- Died: 20 December 1961 (aged 51); London, England
- Military career
- Allegiance: United Kingdom
- Branch: Royal Naval Volunteer Reserve
- Rank: Lieutenant Commander
- Nickname: Mick
- Unit: HMS President
- Conflicts: Second World War: The Blitz
- Awards: George Cross; Officer of the Order of the British Empire; George Medal

Ernest Oliver Gidden, GC, OBE, GM (15 March 1910 – 20 December 1961), known as Mick Gidden, was awarded the George Cross for the "great gallantry and undaunted devotion to duty" he showed while defusing mines and bombs during the Blitz in London. He served at HMS President with the Royal Navy Volunteer Reserve and was cited for making safe a mine that had fallen on Hungerford Bridge on 17 April 1941.

== Early life ==
Gidden was born in Hampstead on 15 March 1910, and attended University College School in Hampstead.

== War service ==
Gidden joined the Royal Navy Volunteer Reserve as a temporary sub-lieutenant in 1940. He was promoted to temporary lieutenant on 9 December 1940 with seniority in that rank from 30 November 1940. He served in HMS Collingwood (Gosport) and HMS President (London), both shore establishments, and became an expert in bomb and mine disposal.

Gidden was awarded the George Medal for defusing a mine that had fallen between two houses in Harlesden in 1940. The notice for this award appeared in the London Gazette of 14 January 1941.

=== George Cross ===
On the night of 16/17 April 1941, a Luftwaffe air raid had destroyed several trains, halted underground services and prompted the evacuation of the War Office after an unexploded bomb was found on Hungerford Bridge, the main bridge into Charing Cross Station.

Gidden found the mine had come to rest across the railway's live high voltage line and that he would have to turn it over to reach the fuse. Working from dawn, it took six hours for him to make the device safe, at times having to ease the distorted casing back with a hammer and chisel where it had melted onto the live 'third rail'.

Notice of the award appeared in the London Gazette of 9 June 1942, reading:

The King has been graciously pleased to approve the award of the George Cross for great gallantry and undaunted devotion to duty to: — Temporary Lieutenant Ernest Oliver Gidden, G.M., R.N.V.R.

On 14 July 1942, the investiture took place at Buckingham Palace where he received the medal from King George VI.

=== Later war career ===
Gidden rose to command a mine clearance section and was promoted to the rank of lieutenant commander in 1942. He was appointed to HMS Nile, Egypt at that time. In 1944 he was Staff Officer to the Commander in Chief, Mediterranean (HMS Byrsa), and took part in the clearance of mines from the Scheldt channel in November 1944. He returned to HMS President in London in 1945.

== Post-war career ==
Gidden returned to civilian life at the war's end. At the time of his death, he lived on Elsworthy Road, Hampstead, London. He died on 21 December 1961, and was cremated at Golders Green Crematorium, London, on 23 December 1961. He is commemorated on his family grave at Hampstead Parish Church.

Gidden's story and medals were exhibited by his son, Michael, on the Antiques Roadshow in February 2003. The expert valued them at £16,000 (equivalent to £29,300 in 2025). In 2025, Gidden's group of medals sold for £100,000 at auction.
