= Thinking Skills and Creativity =

- Discipline: Creativity, education
- Language: English
- Edited by: Pamela Burnard, Teresa Cremin

Publication details
- History: 2006–present
- Publisher: Elsevier
- Frequency: Quarterly
- Impact factor: 2.06 (2019)

Standard abbreviations
- ISO 4: Think. Skills Creativity

Indexing
- ISSN: 1871-1871
- LCCN: 2006206018
- OCLC no.: 71203685

Links
- Journal homepage; Online archive

Thinking Skills and Creativity is a quarterly peer-reviewed academic journal that covers research into the teaching of thinking skills and creativity. The editors-in-chief are Pamela Burnard (University of Cambridge) and Emmanuel Manalo (Kyoto University). The journal was established in 2006 and is published by Elsevier. The journal publishes empirical studies, critical reports, reviews, and theoretical, methodological, and conceptual work on teaching and learning skills and creativity across formal and informal educational and workplace settings.

== Abstracting and indexing ==
The journal is abstracted and indexed in:

- Current Contents/Social & Behavioral Sciences
- PsycINFO
- Scopus
- Social Sciences Citation Index

According to the Journal Citation Reports, the journal has a 2020 impact factor of 3.106.
