= Richard Jessor =

American social psychologist

- Born: November 24, 1924 (age 101); Brooklyn, New York, United States
- Citizenship: American
- Education: Ohio State University; Columbia University
- Occupation: Social psychologist
- Employer: University of Colorado Boulder
- Honours: United States Marine Corps (1943–1946); Battle of Iwo Jima; Purple Heart

Richard “Dick” Jessor (born November 24, 1924) is an American social psychologist and academician, known for his research on adolescent development, health behavior, and Problem Behavior Theory.

== Education and career ==
Jessor joined the University of Colorado Boulder in 1951 and spent most of his academic career there. He holds an M.A. from Columbia University and a Ph.D. from Ohio State University. He co-founded the Institute of Behavioral Science (IBS) and served as its director from 1980 to 2001. In 2025, the IBS building was renamed the “Richard Jessor Building” in his honor.

Jessor's research on alcohol abuse and other problem behaviors among adolescents in the 1960s led to the development of Problem Behavior Theory, which is used as a theoretical framework in studies of adolescent risk behavior. In December 2024, Boulder, Colorado Boulder declared December 19 as '''Dr. Dick Jessor Day''' in recognition of his contributions. He served in the United States Marine Corps during World War II and was wounded at the Battle of Iwo Jima, receiving the Purple Heart. He is also a member of the Committee on Child Development Research and Public Policy. Jessor is a consultant to international organizations, including the World Health Organization and UNICEF, on adolescent health.

== Awards and honors ==
- Purple Heart in World War II
- Outstanding Achievement in Adolescent Medicine Award, Society for Adolescent Medicine (2005)
