= George Giddens =

George Giddens is the name of:

- A musician with the band The Dillards
- The actor who played Walkinshaw in Foggerty's Fairy
