= Oracy =

Skill of fluency in communication

Oracy is articulating ideas, developing understanding and engaging with others through speaking, listening and communication. The term was coined by Andrew M. Wilkinson, a British researcher and educator, in 1965. This word is formed by analogy to literacy and numeracy. The purpose is to draw attention to the neglect of speech and listening in education.

== Concept ==
According to Andrew Wilkinson, oracy in educational theory is the fluent, confident, and correct use of the standard spoken form of one's native language. It also established a standard where students' abilities are developed within an integrated program of speaking and listening, reading and writing. Recent studies also equate oracy with the notion of "talking to learn" within the perspective that knowledge is constructed by the individual knower, through an interaction between what is already known and new experience. An example of oracy-based education initiative was the UK's National Oracy Project, which recognizes the role played by classroom talk and puts equal treatment between spoken and written modes.
