= Dialogical analysis =

Dialogical analysis, or more precisely dialogical interaction analysis, refers to a way of analyzing human communication which is based on the theory of dialogism. The approach has been developed based on the theoretical work of George Herbert Mead and Mikhail Mikhailovich Bakhtin.

== Overview ==
Dialogism makes several assumptions. It assumes that human communication entails the interaction of diverse perspectives and is embedded in a socio-historical context, that the meaning of a communication can be different to the various participants, that it is important to examine the consequences of a communication, and that each participant in a communication is, to some degree, orienting to the orientation of the other.

Dialogical analysis is an interpretative methodology which closely analyzes spoken or written utterances or actions for their embedded communicative significance. Questions typically asked during a dialogical analysis include: What does each interactant think about themselves, the other and what the other thinks of them? What do the given utterances and actions imply about the given activity or participants? Why was a given communicative act performed – why did it need to be said? What was the alternative that the utterance was trying to dispel? People are often borrowing words, phrases and ideas from other people, and accordingly, dialogical analysis often asks: who is doing the talking? Specifically, which voices and echoes are evident in the given utterance?

Although dialogical analysis tends to focus on discourse, it is distinct from discourse analysis and conversation analysis because its focus goes beyond the question of how people speak and what they achieve by speaking. Dialogical analysis uses dialogue as a metaphor for understanding phenomena beyond communication itself, such as the self (see dialogical self), internal dialogues, self-talk, misunderstandings, trust and distrust, the production of knowledge, and relations between groups in society.

Recently there have been attempts to formalize the move from dialogism, which is often quite theoretical, to a systematic methodology for data analysis. These approaches focus upon 'sensitizing questions' that facilitate a dialogical analysis and step-by-step procedures for analyzing multivoicedness.

== See also ==
- Dialogical self
- Interfaith dialogue
- Philosophy of dialogue
