= Dialogue =

Conversation between two or more people

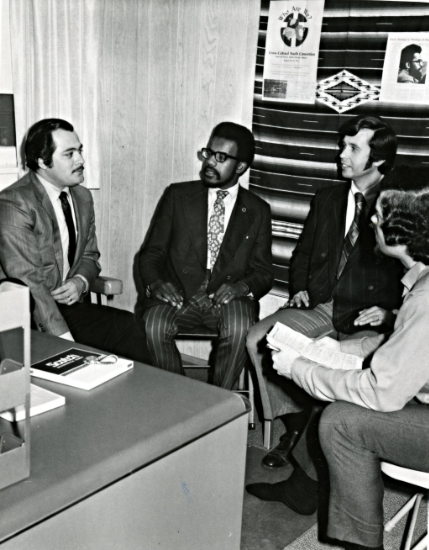
A dialogue amongst participants in a 1972 cross-cultural youth convention

Dialogue (sometimes spelled dialog in American English) is an interactive communication between two or more people, and a literary and theatrical form that depicts such an exchange. As a philosophical or didactic device, it is chiefly associated in the West with the Socratic dialogue as developed by Plato, but antecedents are also found in other traditions including Indian literature.

== Etymology ==
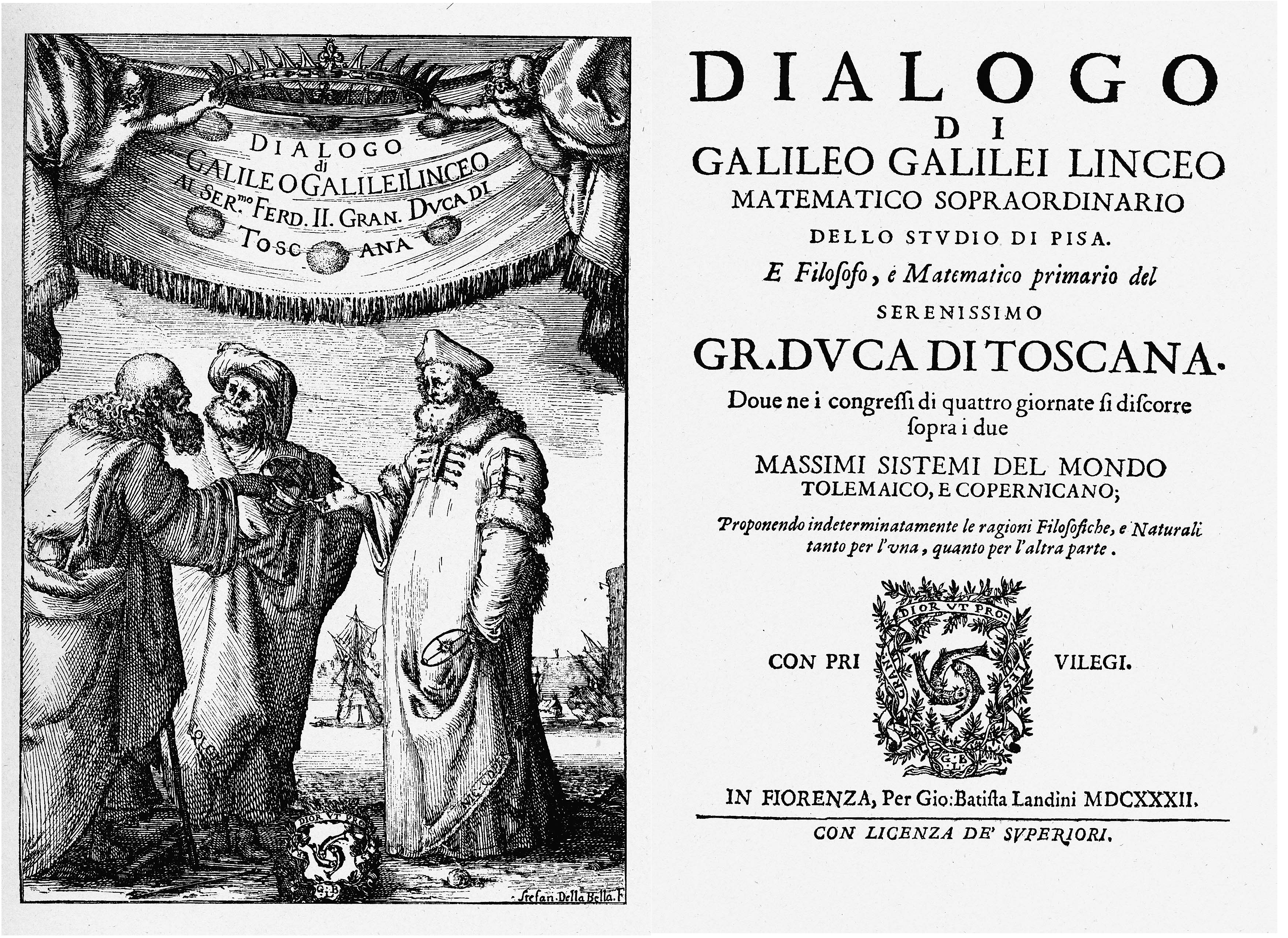
Frontispiece and title page of Galileo's Dialogue Concerning the Two Chief World Systems, 1632

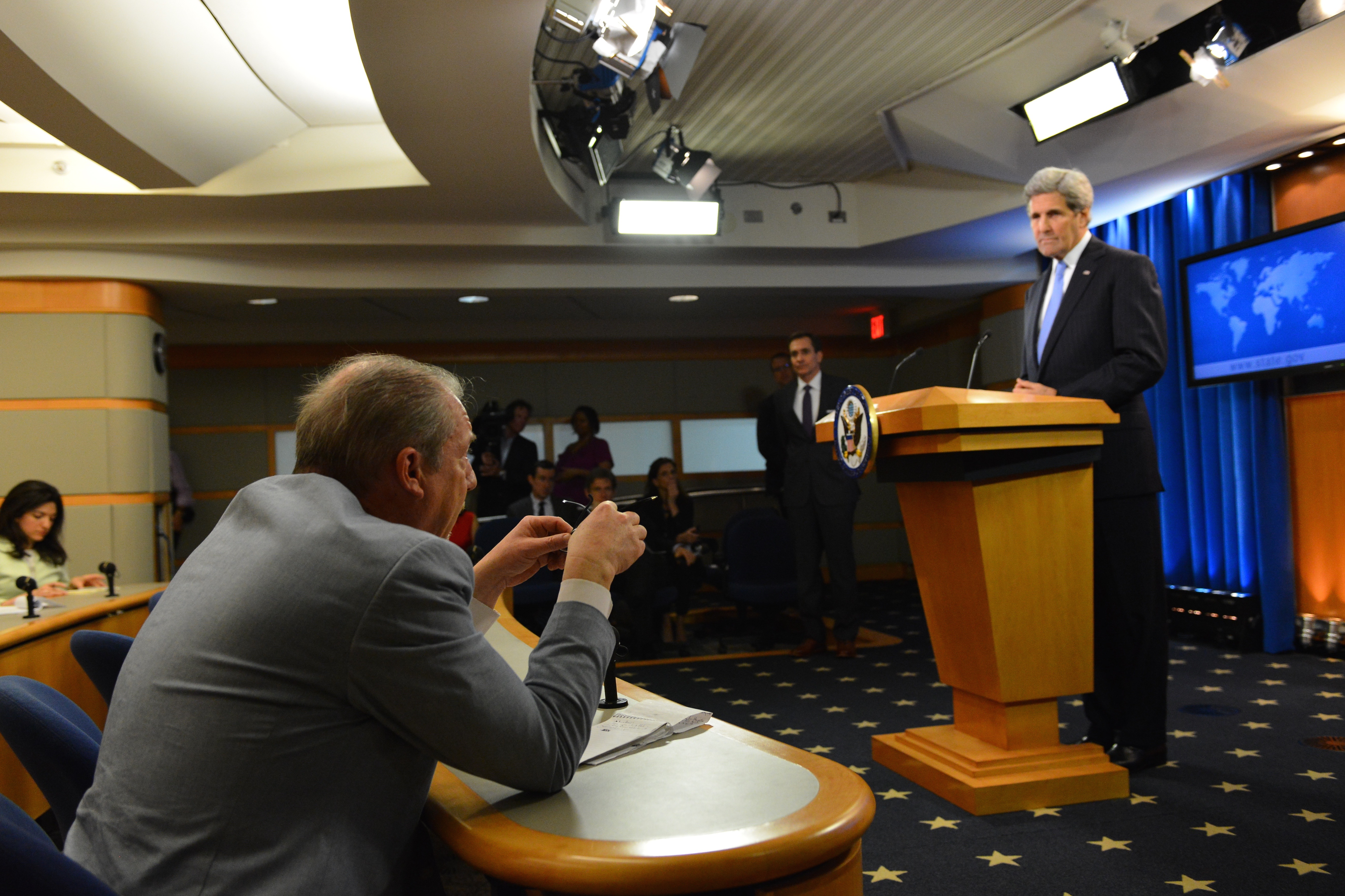
John Kerry listens to a Question of reporter Matt Lee, after giving remarks on World Press Freedom Day (3rd May 2016).

The term dialogue stems from the Greek διάλογος (dialogos, 'conversation'); its roots are διά (dia, 'through') and λόγος (logos, 'speech, reason'). The first extant author who uses the term is Plato, in whose works it is closely associated with the art of dialectic. Latin took over the word as dialogus.

== As genre ==
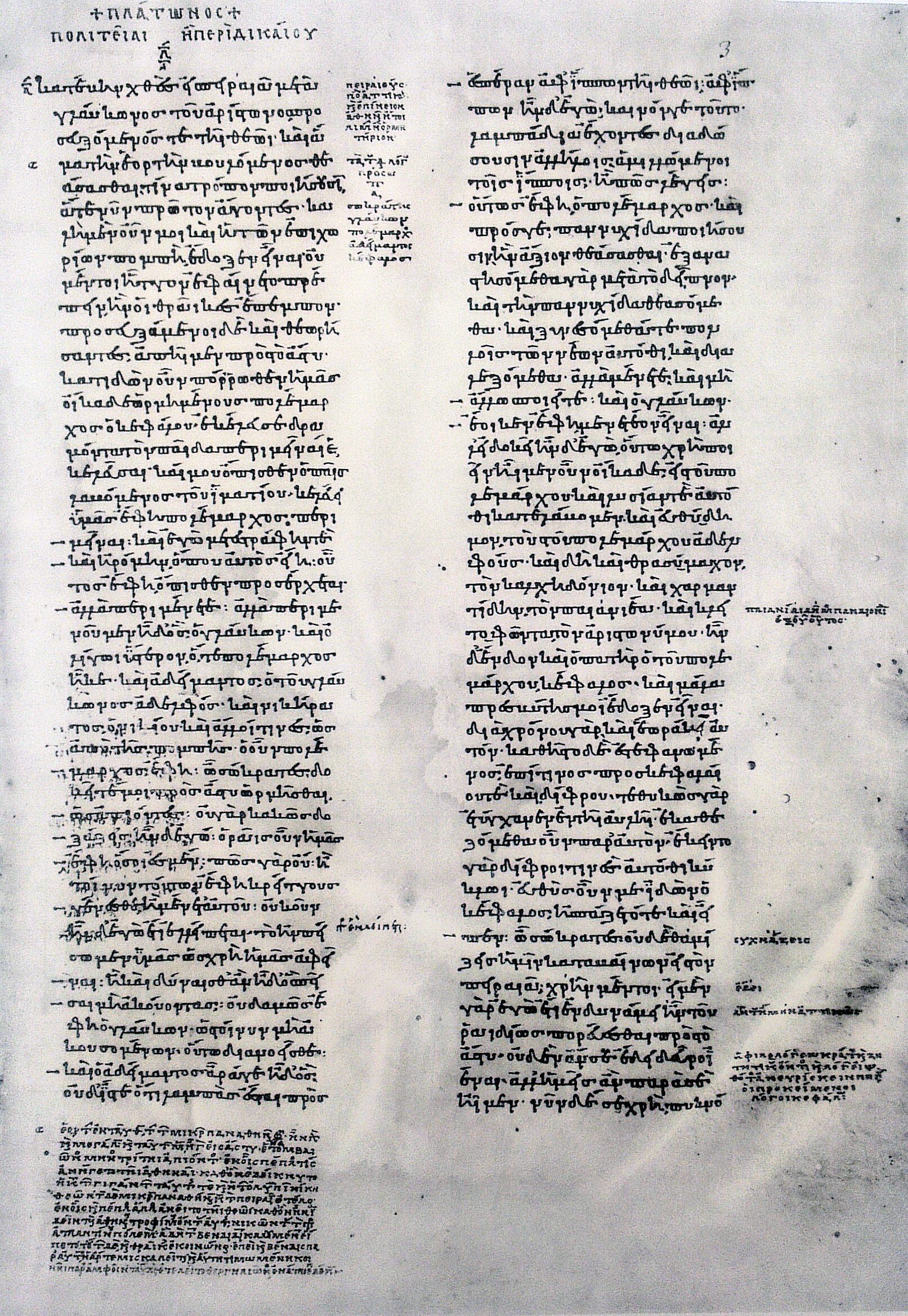
Oldest extant text of Plato's Republic

=== Antiquity ===
Dialogue as a genre in the Middle East and Asia dates back to ancient works, such as Sumerian disputations preserved in copies from the late third millennium BC, Rigvedic dialogue hymns, and the Mahabharata.

In the West, Plato (c. 427 BC – c. 348 BC) has commonly been credited with the systematic use of dialogue as an independent literary form. Ancient sources indicate, however, that the Platonic dialogue had its foundations in the mime, which the Sicilian poets Sophron and Epicharmus had cultivated half a century earlier. These works, admired and imitated by Plato, have not survived and we have only the vaguest idea of how they may have been performed. The Mimes of Herodas, which were found in a papyrus in 1891, give some idea of their character.

Plato further simplified the form and reduced it to pure argumentative conversation, while leaving intact the amusing element of character-drawing. By about 400 BC he had perfected the Socratic dialogue. All his extant writings, except the Apology and Epistles, use this form.

Following Plato, the dialogue became a major literary genre in antiquity, and several important works both in Latin and in Greek were written. Soon after Plato, Xenophon wrote his own Symposium; also, Aristotle is said to have written several philosophical dialogues in Plato's style (of which only fragments survive). In the 2nd century CE, Christian apologist Justin Martyr wrote the Dialogue with Trypho, which was a discourse between Justin representing Christianity and Trypho representing Judaism. Another Christian apologetic dialogue from the time was the Octavius, between the Christian Octavius and pagan Caecilius.

=== Japan ===
In the East, in 13th century Japan, dialogue was used in important philosophical works. In the 1200s, Nichiren Daishonin wrote some of his important writings in dialogue form, describing a meeting between two characters in order to present his argument and theory, such as in "Conversation between a Sage and an Unenlightened Man" (The Writings of Nichiren Daishonin 1: pp. 99–140, dated around 1256), and "On Establishing the Correct Teaching for the Peace of the Land" (Ibid., pp. 6–30; dated 1260), while in other writings he used a question and answer format, without the narrative scenario, such as in "Questions and Answers about Embracing the Lotus Sutra" (Ibid., pp. 55–67, possibly from 1263). The sage or person answering the questions was understood as the author.

=== Modern period ===
Two French writers of eminence borrowed the title of Lucian's most famous collection; both Fontenelle (1683) and Fénelon (1712) prepared Dialogues des morts ("Dialogues of the Dead"). Contemporaneously, in 1688, the French philosopher Nicolas Malebranche published his Dialogues on Metaphysics and Religion, thus contributing to the genre's revival in philosophic circles. In English non-dramatic literature the dialogue did not see extensive use until Berkeley employed it, in 1713, for his treatise, Three Dialogues between Hylas and Philonous. His contemporary, the Scottish philosopher David Hume wrote Dialogues Concerning Natural Religion. A prominent 19th-century example of literary dialogue was Landor's Imaginary Conversations (1821–1828).

In Germany, Wieland adopted this form for several important satirical works published between 1780 and 1799. In Spanish literature, the Dialogues of Valdés (1528) and those on Painting (1633) by Vincenzo Carducci are celebrated. Italian writers of collections of dialogues, following Plato's example, include Torquato Tasso (1586), Galileo (1632), Galiani (1770), Leopardi (1825), and a host of others.

In the 19th century, the French returned to the original application of dialogue. The inventions of "Gyp", of Henri Lavedan, and of others, which tell a mundane anecdote wittily and maliciously in conversation, would probably present a close analogy to the lost mimes of the early Sicilian poets. English writers including Anstey Guthrie also adopted the form, but these dialogues seem to have found less of a popular following among the English than their counterparts written by French authors.

The Platonic dialogue, as a distinct genre which features Socrates as a speaker and one or more interlocutors discussing some philosophical question, experienced something of a rebirth in the 20th century. Authors who have recently employed it include George Santayana, in his eminent Dialogues in Limbo (1926, 2nd ed. 1948; this work also includes such historical figures as Alcibiades, Aristippus, Avicenna, Democritus, and Dionysius the Younger as speakers). Also Edith Stein and Iris Murdoch used the dialogue form. Stein imagined a dialogue between Edmund Husserl (phenomenologist) and Thomas Aquinas (metaphysical realist). Murdoch included not only Socrates and Alcibiades as interlocutors in her work Acastos: Two Platonic Dialogues (1986), but featured a young Plato himself as well. More recently Timothy Williamson wrote Tetralogue, a philosophical exchange on a train between four people with radically different epistemological views.

In the 20th century, philosophical treatments of dialogue emerged from thinkers including Mikhail Bakhtin, Paulo Freire, Martin Buber, and David Bohm. Although diverging in many details, these thinkers have proposed a holistic concept of dialogue. Educators such as Freire and Ramón Flecha have also developed a body of theory and techniques for using egalitarian dialogue as a pedagogical tool.

== As topic ==
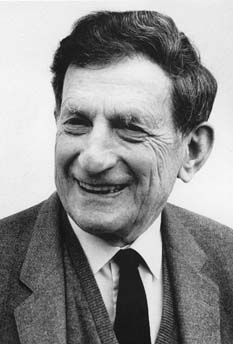
David Bohm, a leading 20th-century thinker on dialogue

Martin Buber assigns dialogue a pivotal position in his theology. His most influential work is titled I and Thou. Buber cherishes and promotes dialogue not as some purposive attempt to reach conclusions or express mere points of view, but as the very prerequisite of authentic relationship between man and man, and between man and God. Buber's thought centres on "true dialogue", which is characterised by openness, honesty, and mutual commitment.

The Second Vatican Council placed a major emphasis on dialogue within the church and with the world. Most of the council's documents refer to some kind of dialogue: dialogue "between the laity and their spiritual leaders" (Lumen gentium), dialogue with other religions (Nostra aetate: "dialogue and collaboration with the followers of other religions"), dialogue with other Christians (Unitatis redintegratio: "fraternal dialogue on points of doctrine and the more pressing pastoral problems of our time"), dialogue between a diocesan bishop and his diocesan clergy, especially on pastoral matters (Christus Dominus), dialogue with modern society (Gaudium et spes: "the rightful betterment of this world ... cannot be realized, ... apart from sincere and prudent dialogue"), to which Catholic schools can make an important contribution (Gravissimum educationis), and dialogue with political authorities (Dignitatis humanae: "[in] dialogue ... men explain to one another the truth they have discovered, or think they have discovered, in order thus to assist one another in the quest for truth"). However, in the English translations of these texts, "dialogue" was used to translate two Latin words with distinct meanings, colloquium ("discussion") and dialogus ("dialogue"). (Note: In the referenced sections in Nostra aetate, Christus Dominus and Gaudium et spes, the word colloquium is used; Unitatis redintegratio, Gravissimum educationis and Dignitatis humanae refer to dialogus. The English wording "fraternal dialogue" in Lumen gentium comes from familiari commercio in the Latin version.) The choice of terminology appears to have been strongly influenced by Buber's thought.

The physicist David Bohm originated a related form of dialogue where a group of people talk together in order to explore their assumptions of thinking, meaning, communication, and social effects. This group consists of ten to thirty people who meet for a few hours regularly or a few continuous days. In a Bohm dialogue, dialoguers agree to leave behind debate tactics that attempt to convince and, instead, talk from their own experience on subjects that are improvised on the spot.

In his influential works, Russian philosopher Mikhail Bakhtin provided an extralinguistic methodology for analysing the nature and meaning of dialogue:

Dialogic relations have a specific nature: they can be reduced neither to the purely logical (even if dialectical) nor to the purely linguistic (compositional-syntactic). They are possible only between complete utterances of various speaking subjects... Where there is no word and no language, there can be no dialogic relations; they cannot exist among objects or logical quantities (concepts, judgments, and so forth). Dialogic relations presuppose a language, but they do not reside within the system of language. They are impossible among elements of a language.

The Brazilian educationalist Paulo Freire (1921-1997), known for developing popular education, advanced dialogue as a type of pedagogy. Freire held that dialogued communication allowed students and teachers to learn from one another in an environment characterised by respect and equality. A great advocate for oppressed peoples, Freire was concerned with praxis—action that is informed and linked to people's values. Dialogued pedagogy was not only about deepening understanding; it was also about making positive changes in the world: to make it better.

The philosopher Jürgen Habermas (1929-2026) argued in The Theory of Communicative Action (1981) that it is the human capacity for rational dialogue which has sustained human societies.

== As practice ==
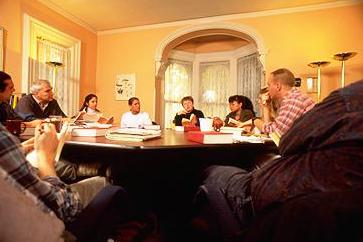
A classroom dialogue at Shimer College

Dialogue is used as a practice in a variety of settings, from education to business. Influential theorists of dialogal education include Paulo Freire and Ramon Flecha.

In the United States, an early form of dialogic learning emerged in the Great Books movement of the early to mid-20th century, which emphasised egalitarian dialogues in small classes as a way of understanding the foundational texts of the Western canon. Institutions that continue to follow a version of this model include the Great Books Foundation, Shimer College in Chicago, and St. John's College in Annapolis and Santa Fe.

=== Egalitarian dialogue ===
Egalitarian dialogue is a concept in dialogic learning. It may be defined as a dialogue in which contributions are considered according to the validity of their reasoning, instead of according to the status or position of power of those who make them. The partners are equal, but different; hence the difference between "you" and "me" is preserved in egalitarian dialogue and not skipped in favor of a supposed "we".

=== Structured dialogue ===
Structured dialogue represents a class of dialogue practices developed as a means of orienting the dialogic discourse toward problem understanding and consensual action. Whereas most traditional dialogue practices are unstructured or semi-structured, such conversational modes have been observed as insufficient for the coordination of multiple perspectives in a problem area. A disciplined form of dialogue, where participants agree to follow a dialogue framework or a facilitator, enables groups to address complex shared problems.

Aleco Christakis (who created structured dialogue design) and John N. Warfield (who created science of generic design) were two of the leading developers of this school of dialogue. The rationale for engaging structured dialogue follows the observation that a rigorous bottom-up democratic form of dialogue must be structured to ensure that a sufficient variety of stakeholders represents the problem system of concern, and that their voices and contributions are equally balanced in the dialogic process.

Structured dialogue is employed for complex problems including peacemaking (e.g., Civil Society Dialogue project in Cyprus) and indigenous community development., as well as government and social policy formulation.

In one deployment, structured dialogue is (according to a European Union definition) "a means of mutual communication between governments and administrations including EU institutions and young people. The aim is to get young people's contribution towards the formulation of policies relevant to young peoples lives." The application of structured dialogue requires one to differentiate the meanings of discussion and deliberation.

Groups such as Worldwide Marriage Encounter and Retrouvaille use dialogue as a communication tool for married couples. Both groups teach a dialogue method that helps couples learn more about each other in non-threatening postures, which helps to foster growth in the married relationship.

=== Dialogical leadership ===
The German philosopher and classicist Karl-Martin Dietz emphasises the original meaning of dialogue (from Greek dia-logos, i.e. 'two words'), which goes back to Heraclitus: "The logos [...] answers to the question of the world as a whole and how everything in it is connected. Logos is the one principle at work, that gives order to the manifold in the world." For Dietz, dialogue means "a kind of thinking, acting and speaking, which the logos "passes through"" Therefore, talking to each other is merely one part of "dialogue". Acting dialogically means directing someone's attention to another one and to reality at the same time.

Against this background and together with Thomas Kracht, Karl-Martin Dietz developed what he termed "dialogical leadership" as a form of organisational management. In several German enterprises and organisations it replaced the traditional human resource management, e.g. in the German drugstore chain dm-drogerie markt.

Separately, and earlier to Thomas Kracht and Karl-Martin Dietz, Rens van Loon published multiple works on the concept of dialogical leadership, starting with a chapter in the 2003 book The Organization as Story.

=== Moral dialogues ===
Moral dialogues are social processes which allow societies or communities to form new shared moral understandings. Moral dialogues have the capacity to modify the moral positions of a sufficient number of people to generate widespread approval for actions and policies that previously had little support or were considered morally inappropriate by many. Communitarian philosopher Amitai Etzioni has developed an analytical framework which—modelling historical examples—outlines the reoccurring components of moral dialogues. Elements of moral dialogues include: establishing a moral baseline; sociological dialogue starters which initiate the process of developing new shared moral understandings; the linking of multiple groups' discussions in the form of "megalogues"; distinguishing the distinct attributes of the moral dialogue (apart from rational deliberations or culture wars); dramatisation to call widespread attention to the issue at hand; and, closure through the establishment of a new shared moral understanding. Moral dialogues allow people of a given community to determine what is morally acceptable to a majority of people within the community.

== See also ==
- Argumentation theory
- Collaborative leadership
- Deliberation
- Dialectic
- Dialogical self
- Dialogue Among Civilizations
- Dialogue (Bakhtin)
- Dialogue mapping
- Intercultural dialogue
- Interfaith dialogue
- Intergroup dialogue
- Quality time
- Rogerian argument
- Speech

== Bibliography ==
- Bakhtin, M. M. (1986). Speech Genres and Other Late Essays. Trans. by Vern W. McGee. Austin, Tx: University of Texas Press.
- Kutzko, David (2012). "In pursuit of Sophron". In Bosher, Kathryn (ed.). Theater Outside Athens: Drama in Greek Sicily and South Italy. Cambridge University Press. p. 377. ISBN 9780521761789.
- Hirzel, Rudolf (1895). Der Dialog. Ein literarhistorischer Versuch. 2 vols. Leipzig: S. Hirzel.
- Hösle, Vittorio (2013). The Philosophical Dialogue: a Poetics and a Hermeneutics. Trans. by Steven Rendall. Notre Dame, University of Notre Dame Press.
- Maranhão, Tullio (1990). The Interpretation of Dialogue University of Chicago Press ISBN 0-226-50433-6
- Nolan, Ann Michele (2006). A Privileged Moment: Dialogue in the Language of the Second Vatican Council. Peter Lang. p. 276. ISBN 978-3039109845.
- E. Di Nuoscio, "Epistemologia del dialogo. Una difesa filosofica del confronto pacifico tra culture", Carocci, Roma, 2011
- Suitner, Riccarda (2022). The Dialogues of the Dead of the Early German Enlightenment. Trans. by Gwendolin Goldbloom. Leiden-Boston: Brill
- Voss, Bernd Reiner (1970). Der Dialog in der frühchristlichen Literatur. Studia et testimonia antiqua, vol. 9. München: W. Fink.
