= Ramón Flecha =

Spanish sociologist and academic

Ramón Flecha is a Spanish sociologist who is a professor of sociology at the University of Barcelona, Doctor Honoris Causa from West University of Timişoara, and a researcher in social sciences in Europe. In 2025, he was suspended from the University after allegations of sexual abuse.

His sociological contributions cover different areas; research methodology (communicative methodology), culture (dialogic literary gatherings), economics (successful cooperative actions), education (learning communities), cultural groups (distinction of modern and postmodern racism), new masculinities (alternative masculinities), sociology of science (scientific, political and social impact) and social theory (dialogic societies).

== Biography ==
Ramón Flecha was born in 1952.

In 1967, he collaborated in the creation of a cultural centre of activities in the most deprived area of his city of birth, Bilbao. He was a member of the clandestine opposition against Franco's dictatorship from 1969 until democracy arrived in Spain.

In 1978 he moved to a neighbourhood of Barcelona where there were shacks and founded La Verneda Adult School – Sant Martí. He worked with Paulo Freire for more than twenty years. He developed the practice of dialogic literary gatherings as a form of critical pedagogy.

In 1991 Flecha founded the CREA research centre at the University of Barcelona.

In 1997 he published his first book that included the theory of dialogic learning, subsequently published in English and in Chinese.

In 2018, he advised the evaluation of the social impact of science in the European Framework Programme.

== Recognition ==
Alain Touraine wrote a promotional blurb for Flecha's 2000 book Sharing Words:

At times, as Ramón Flecha demonstrates, knowledge goes from bottom to top, when individuals without degrees produce and invent cultural analyses based on their own experience.

Ulrich Beck wrote the preface to Contemporary Sociological Theory, co-authored by Flecha in 20223, saying the book

combines rigorous research with facts, including the intention for a dialogical utopia. But this broad intention is presented in the book, joining theory with critique and empirical research with praxis, in such a charming way that it grabs its readers and captures them under its spell.

== Distinctions and awards ==
His contributions have been awarded by various institutions, some examples;

- 2007 Doctor Honoris Causa by the West University of Timișoara
- 2012 Gold Medal for Merit in Education of the Junta de Andalucía
- 2016 Research Award for his contribution to schooling and academic success of roma students – Instituto Cultura Gitana
- 2019 Catalonia Award of Sociology 2019 – Associació Catalana de Sociologia
- 2019 Muncunill Social Innovation Award – Ajuntament de Terrassa

== Publications ==
Some of his publications are;

- Flecha, R. (2021). ‘Second-Order Sexual Harassment: Violence Against the Silence Breakers Who Support the Victims’, Violence Against Women, pp. 1–20.
- Puigvert, L., Gelsthorpe, L., Soler-Gallart, M., & Flecha, R. (2019). Girls’ perceptions of boys with violent attitudes and behaviours, and of sexual attraction. Palgrave Communications, 5(1), 1–12. https://doi.org/10.1057/s41599-019-0262-5
- Flecha, R., Soler, M. & Sordé, T. (2015).Social impact: Europe must fund social sciences, Nature, 528, 193. doi:10.1038/528193d
- Flecha, R. (2015). Successful Educational Actions for Inclusion and Social Cohesion in Europe. New York: Springer.
- Flecha, R. (2014). Using mixed methods from a communicative orientation: Researching with grassroots Roma. Journal of Mixed Methods Research, 8 (3):245-254. doi:10.1177/1558689814527945
- Flecha, R. & Soler, M. (2014).Communicative Methodology: Successful Actions and Dialogic Politics. Current Sociology, 62(2): 232–242. doi:10.1177/0011392113515141
- Flecha, R., & Soler, M. (2013). Turning difficulties into possibilities: engaging Roma families and students in school through dialogic learning. Cambridge Journal of Education. doi:10.1080/0305764X.2013.819068 This paper obtained the 2013 Best Paper Prize of Cambridge Journal of Education.
- Touraine, A.; Wieviorka, M.; Flecha, R. et al. (2004). Conocimiento e identidad. Voces de grupos culturales en la investigación social. Barcelona: Roure
- Flecha, R. (2000): Sharing Words. Theory and Practice of Dialogic Learning. Lanham, M.D: Rowman & Littlefield, also available in Spanish and Chinese.
- Castells, M.; Flecha, R.; Freire, P.; Giroux, H.; Macedo, D. & Willis, P. (1999): Critical Education in the New Information Age. Lanham, M.D: Rowman & Littlefield. Foreword by Peter Mclaren. Also available in Spanish and Portuguese.
- Flecha, R. (1999). Modern and postmodern racism in Europe: dialogic approach and anti-racist pedagogies, Harvard Educational Review, 69(2), 150–171.
