= Committee of Fifty =

Committee of Fifty could refer to one of the following:

- Committee of Fifty (1829), met in New York City and advocated redistribution of property between the poor and rich
- Committee of Fifty (1893), formed by scholars to investigate problems associated with the use and abuse of alcoholic beverages
- Committee of Fifty (1906), called into existence by Mayor Eugene Schmitz during the 1906 San Francisco earthquake

== See also ==
- Committee of 100 (disambiguation)
- Committee of Seventy, a group in Philadelphia best known for monitoring elections
- Committee of Sixty, a group formed in New York City in 1775 to enforce the boycott of British goods
- Committee of 19, a committee of students at Auburn University involve in the War on Hunger
- Committee of Fifteen, a New York City citizens' group that lobbied for the elimination of prostitution and gambling
- Committee of Fourteen, an association dedicated to the abolition of Raines law hotels in New York City
- Committee of Ten, a group of educators that recommended the standardization of American high school curriculum
- Committee of Nine, a group of state leaders involved in unifying the country following the American Civil War
- Committee of Six, six men also known as the Secret Six who secretly funded the American abolitionist, John Brown
- Committee of Five, the group delegated to draft the United States Declaration of Independence
