= George Henry Evans =

American activist (1805–1856)

George Henry Evans (March 25, 1805 – February 2, 1856) was an English-born American radical reformer who was in the Working Men's movement of 1829 and the trade union movements of the 1830s. Evans was born in Bromyard, Herefordshire, England, the son of George Evans and Sarah White, and had a younger brother, Frederick William Evans, who became a Shaker and served as an elder in the Mount Lebanon Shaker Society.

In 1844, Evans, the trade unionist John Windt, the former Chartist Thomas Devyr and others founded the National Reform Association, which lobbied Congress and sought political supporters with the slogan "Vote Yourself a Farm." Between 1844 and 1862, Congress received petitions signed by 55,000 Americans calling for free public lands for homesteaders.

Free land was depicted as a means of attracting the excessive eastern population westward, and, as a result, bringing about higher wages and better working conditions for the laboring man in the eastern industrial areas. For many years the public domain had been regarded as the safety valve of the American political and economic order. The efforts of Evans and his allies—notably Horace Greeley—led to the Homestead Act of 1862. Evans, thus, deserves the title of "Father of the Homestead Act."

Evans was a publisher, and the editor of a series of radical newspapers including: Workingman's Advocate (1829–36, 1844–45), New York Daily Sentinel (1830), The Man (1834), The Radical (1841–43), The People's Rights (1844), and Young America (1845–49). He also spent the period 1837–41, and the period after 1848, on his farm in New Jersey. George Henry Evans died in 1856, at Granville (now known as Keansburg), New Jersey.
