= Safety valve (disambiguation) =

A safety valve is a mechanism for the release of a substance from a pressurized vessel when the pressure or temperature exceeds preset limits.

Safety valve may also refer to:

- Safety valve (law), a provision in the United States Federal Sentencing Guidelines
- Safety valve theory, relating unemployment and the Homestead Act of 1862
- Safety-valve institution, a term used in sociology to describe organizations which serve to prevent tensions from accumulating in a society
- Safety Valve (Biscayne Bay), a structure of sand flats and tidal channels separating Biscayne Bay in Florida from the Atlantic Ocean
- Safety valve, a method for managing Emissions trading
- Safety shutoff valve, a device to close a line and stop the flow of material
- Downhole safety valve, a shutoff device in a gas or oil well
- An oral inflation valve that does not let the air out unless, for example, the valve stem is pinched
- The Safety Valve programme, a UK Department for Education initiative to tackle school grant deficits of 55 English local authorities.

== See also ==
- Relief valve
