= Culture of popular laughter =

Cultural-historical term coined by Mikhail Bakhtin

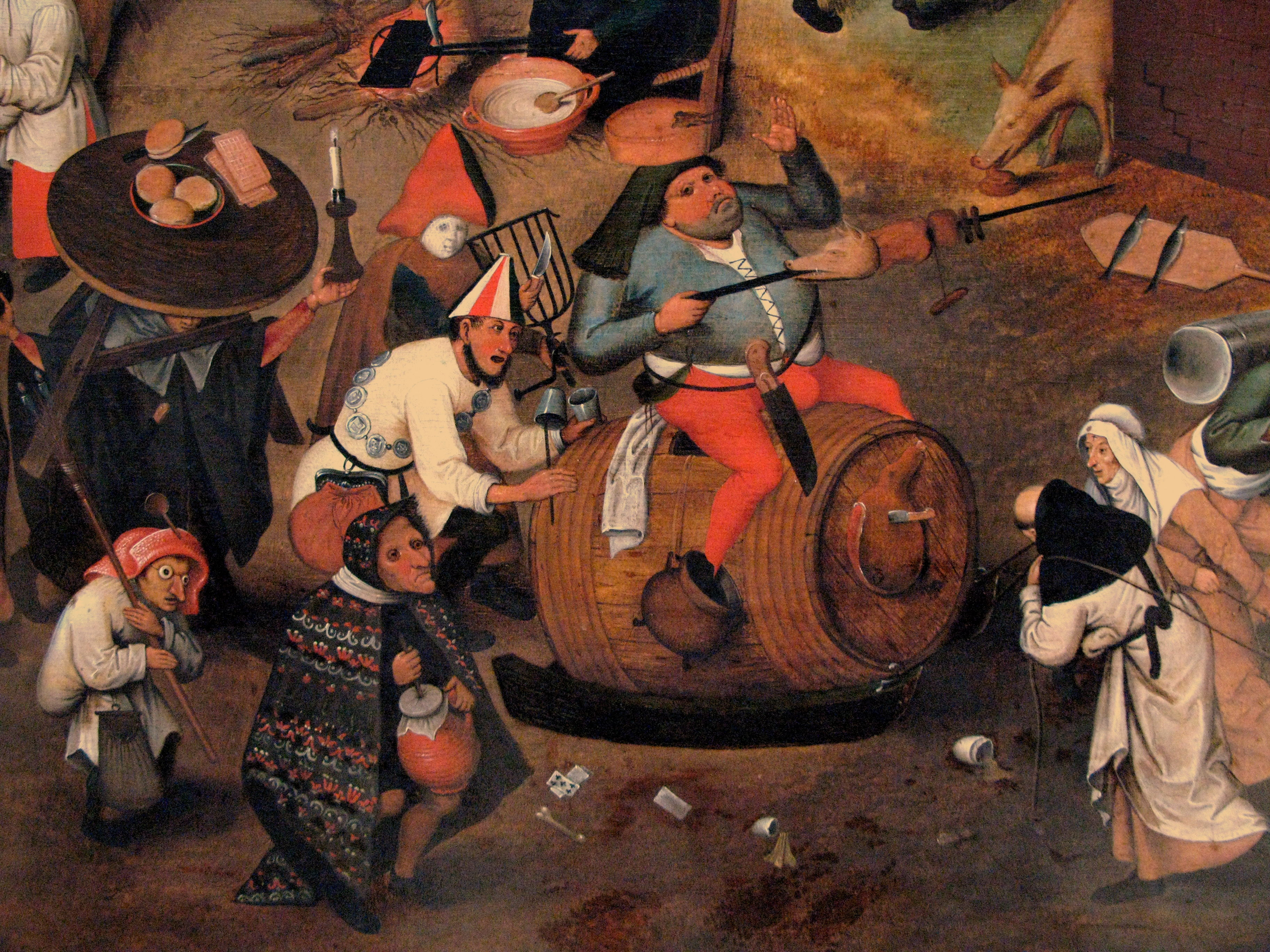
Carnival and debauchery is a running theme in the paintings of Pieter Bruegel the Elder, painted during the 16th century.

The "culture of popular laughter" is a cultural-historical term coined by the literary critic Mikhail Bakhtin in his book Rabelais and His World (1965), which studied popular culture in Renaissance Europe through the themes of François Rabelais's book Gargantua and Pantagruel (1532–64). The idea of the culture of popular laughter combines two literary ideas developed by Bakhtin in the same work: "grotesque realism" and "carnivalesque" which examined, respectively, the celebration of primary needs and the idea of carnival in which social norms were subverted.

The culture of popular laughter was originally formulated based on the writings of Rabelais, but has also been applied in the interpretation of peasant scenes painted by Pieter Bruegel the Elder and his descendants. The example has also been applied to Japanese society.

== Carnivalesque ==
The idea of "carnivalesque" coined by Bakhtin also forms part of his wider theory of popular laughter. He argued that, during times of carnival such as the Feast of Fools, social norms were deliberately inverted. The carnival then became a form of "safety-valve" institution, which served a structural-functionalist role to temporarily release stresses in the contemporary social system. Bakhtin, however, argued that this form of system was "formalized" in the culture of the period as "popular laughter".

== Relevance ==
The historian Gábor Klaniczay argued that "popular laughter" stretched through all echelons of society and was not restricted to the peasantry. Bakhtin's theory has also been credited with bringing about a scholarly reassessment of the importance of popular culture in history.
