= Committee of Fifty (1829) =

The Committee of Fifty met in New York City, United States, in October 1829. They advocated redistribution of property between the poor and rich; as well as abolition of banking, monopoly, and debt imprisonment.

Members included:

- Alexander Ming, Sr.
- Isaac Odell
- Robert Dale Owen
- Thomas Skidmore
- William G. Tillou

They also nominated a slate of Working Men's Party candidates for the upcoming elections.

== See also ==
- Working Men's Party
- Communism
- Socialism
- Anarchism
- Industrial Revolution
