= WEGL =

Radio station at Auburn University in Auburn, Alabama

WEGL 91.1 FM
- Auburn, Alabama; United States
- Broadcast area: Lee, Chambers, Macon, Russell, and Tallapoosa Counties in Alabama, and Muscogee County, Georgia
- Frequency: 91.1 MHz
- Branding: 91.1 WEGL FM

Programming
- Format: Variety

Ownership
- Owner: Auburn University Board of Trustees; (Class A noncommercial)

History
- First air date: April 25, 1971
- Call sign meaning: War EaGLe

Technical information
- Licensing authority: FCC
- Facility ID: 6107
- Class: A (non-commercial)
- ERP: 2300 watts
- HAAT: 90 meters (295 feet)
- Transmitter coordinates: 32°36′1″N 85°29′53″W

Links
- Public license information: 91.1 FM Public file; LMS
- Webcast: weglfm.com
- Website: weglfm.com /instagram: @wegl_au /twitter:@WEGL_AU

WEGL 91.1 FM (91.1 FM) is a Class A, non-commercial, student-run college radio station owned by Auburn University in Auburn, Alabama. The station broadcasts at 2,300 watts from a tower located on the university's campus.

WEGL's broadcast listening area includes the Alabama counties of Lee, Chambers, Macon, Russell, Tallapoosa, and Muscogee County, Georgia. The station also streams over the internet through its website.

The bulk of funding for the operation of WEGL 91 is allocated by Auburn University's Student Government Association and comes directly from Auburn's students' Student Activity Fees.

WEGL's all-volunteer DJ staff includes members of the Auburn University student, faculty, and staff populations.

== History ==
WEGL was not the first radio station at Auburn University. In 1922, WMAV began broadcasting from Broun Hall with a 1,500-watt homemade transmitter. It became part of the university's Extension Service and received a new name, WAPI (for the school's name at the time: Alabama Polytechnic Institute.) WAPI was later moved to Birmingham, Alabama.

On June 1, 1970, the Board of Trustees authorized then-University President Harry Philpott to submit an application, on behalf of the Board of Trustees, to the Federal Communications Commission (FCC) for a permit to construct and operate an FM radio station. The Student Government Association then funded the operation of the station.

On April 25, 1971, WEGL Radio signed on the air with 10 watts of power and began broadcasting at 91.1 megahertz (MHz), as assigned by the FCC. The first song broadcast was "Another Day" by Paul McCartney. The first WEGL studio was located in room 1239 of Haley Center. After one year of operation, a student committee submitted a proposal to the Auburn University Board of Student Communication requesting a power increase. With the support of the university's President, WEGL's effective radiated power (ERP) increased to 380 watts in 1975. In June 1977, the station began broadcasting in stereo. The last song broadcast in mono was Elton John's Captain Fantastic and the first song broadcast in stereo was "You've Got A Cold" by 10CC.

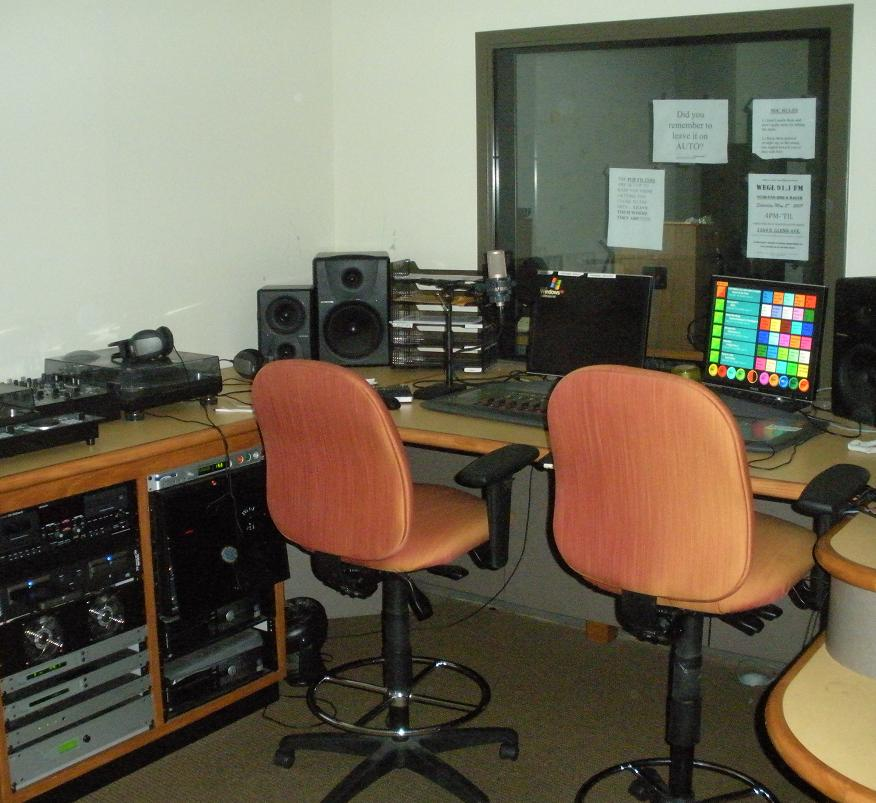
WEGL 91's broadcasting studio in its current location in Suite 1105 of the New Auburn University Student Center.

In 1988, the station upgraded its power to 3,000 watts and became a Class A Non-Commercial radio station. During the 1989–1990 school year, plans were finalized to move WEGL Radio from its home in the Haley Center to a new location in Foy Student Union. On October 8, 1990, then university president James E. Martin officially signed WEGL on for the first time from the Foy Student Union.

WEGL remained in Foy Student Union until the summer of 2008. WEGL made its final broadcast from that location at 5:00 PM on Friday, August 15, 2008. The final song broadcast from Foy Student Union was "A Little Bit" by Tim Fite.

WEGL, along with all other campus media, relocated from Foy Student Union to the new Harold Melton Student Center during the first weeks of the fall 2008 semester. Broadcasting with live DJs and Internet streaming audio resumed shortly thereafter from the new location.

On April 25, 2009, WEGL, in association with the Committee of 19, held its first live music event in over a decade. "WEGLfest" was held in the ballroom of the New Student Center and all proceeds from the event went to benefit Auburn's War on Hunger. Performers at the event included Magnolia Sons, Weak Music for Thomas, and Tony Brook. The event took place on the 38th anniversary of WEGL's first air-date.

== Programming ==
WEGL 91.1 is a traditional "college radio" station in that the station's programming consists of an eclectic mix of genres including, but not limited to: Rock, Hip-Hop, Pop, Blues, Jazz, Country and Bluegrass, Soul, Dance & Techno, R&B, Reggae, World Music, Oldies, and Gospel. In addition to music, WEGL also has a sports department that broadcasts live sports, including Auburn Volleyball, Soccer, and Softball over the air along with Wheelchair Basketball and Lacrosse on YouTtube. The station's most recent addition was the university's softball team broadcasts, added in July 2023. WEGL reports its charts to the College Music Journal.

== See also ==
- Campus radio
- List of college radio stations in the United States
