= Mechanic's Free Press =

The Mechanic's Free Press, published from 1828 to 1831 in Philadelphia, was one of the United States' first labor union newspapers and was instrumental in starting the American labor movement. It also helped turn American laborers into a unified political force.

== Founding ==
The Mechanic's Free Press was founded as a result of the beginning of the American labor movement in 1827. That year in Philadelphia, representatives from fifteen trades formed the Mechanics' Union of Trade Associations, which was created to change what the founders saw as the historical lack of political control for poor workers.

The Mechanic's Free Press was founded in April 1828 with the goal of spreading the union's pro-labor message to communities across the country. The paper reached a circulation of 2,000, half the circulation of the largest New York City newspaper at that time.

The paper's editor and founder, William Heighton, was an English-born shoemaker. He told readers the Mechanic's Free Press was meant to "raise the productive classes to that condition of true independence and equality which their practical skill and ingenuity, their immense utility to the nation, and their growing intelligence demand." He called the working people the "blood, bone, sinew of the nation." He also invoked Biblical references to make his points, comparing industrialists of the day to money changers who should be driven away "from the temple of freedom." Heighton quit his job as a factory worker at the age of 28 and used his small savings to purchase a printing press.

The newspaper itself was a four-page publication that ran ads for clothing and blacksmith services.

== Advocacy ==
The Mechanic's Free Press advocated for several causes that its founders thought would improve the lives of factory workers. The newspaper advocacy goals included securing a ten-hour workday, curbing child labor, creating tax-supported public schools, and abolishing imprisonment as a punishment for debt.

The first of those goals, securing a ten-hour workday for all workers, was meant to help children receive a better education and give workers enough time to become informed citizens. Workers at the time labored from before sunrise to after sunset, leaving little time to study or enjoy the outdoors. As a former child laborer, Heighton felt that the "sun to sun" work schedule prevented workers from becoming informed and questioning their circumstances. Heighton wrote that, as long as the schedule was intact, factory bosses would continue "perpetuating amongst us invidious and artificial class distinctions, unnatural and unjust inequalities."

To combat child labor, Heighton in 1830 published the first study linking child labor with illiteracy. According to the study, five out of every six child factory workers could not read or write their own names. Heighton also wrote editorials to protest the lack of child labor laws at the time.

Heighton considered securing an education for all children to be the "first and most important" mission of the Mechanic's Free Press. The newspaper wrote editorials supporting universal education and Heighton himself wrote and submitted two bills to the Pennsylvania state legislature that called for universal education.

To fight for the abolition of imprisonment as a penalty for debt, Heighton once again wrote editorials and submitted a bill to the Pennsylvania General Assembly. The newspaper's editorials said debt imprisonment, which was a common punishment at the time, was consummate to making poverty itself a crime.

== Political impact ==
The Mechanic's Free Press was one of the main drivers behind the politicization of American laborers. Heighton said the established government served the wealthy elite while ignoring the poor. After founding the paper, Heighton called on workers to establish their own political party. The Working Men's Party was founded soon after with the Mechanic's Free Press as its official voice.

Voters elected twenty-one of the party's members as officials to local offices in Philadelphia in the fall of 1828. They elected another twenty of the party's candidates to local offices the following year.

The paper's political success was acknowledged by one of the mainstream newspapers, which typically treated the nascent labor press with hostility and disdain. The Free Trade Advocate, a New York City newspaper, said the Mechanic's Free Press had achieved two lofty goals: circulating to more than 2,000 subscribers every week and creating an environment in which the workers held "the balance of the power."

The labor movement was spurred on by the successes in Pennsylvania and expanded into New York State. The Mechanic's Free Press began circulating as far west as Ohio.

== Legacy ==
Although the Working Men's Party ceased to exist in 1832 and the Mechanic's Free Press ended publication in 1831, the paper achieved some its goals. A mandatory ten-hour work day was established in Philadelphia by 1831, and the Pennsylvania state legislature adopted the state's first child labor laws in 1832. In 1834, that state enacted laws creating tax-funded schools.
