= Workingmen's Party (disambiguation) =

Workingmen's Party most often refers to the Workingmen's Party of the United States.

Workingmen's Party may also refer to:

- Workingmen's Party of California
- Workingmen's Party of Illinois, a socialist party
- Working Men's Party (New York)
- Working Men's Party (Philadelphia), Pennsylvania
- Social-Democratic Workingmen's Party of North America, a socialist party
