= Heighton =

Heighton is a surname. Notable people with the surname include:

- Jim Heighton (born 1944), Canadian football player
- Steven Heighton (born 1961), Canadian novelist and poet
- William Heighton (19th century), leader of the Philadelphia Working Man's Party

== See also ==
- South Heighton
- Huyton
