= National Reform Association (chartered 1844) =

Defunct American political organization

The National Reform Association was an American radical reformist political organization, founded in 1844 by radicals George Henry Evans, Thomas Ainge Devyr, John Windt and others with the aim of lobbying Congress to pass a wide range of land reforms. The NRA campaigned with the slogan "Vote Yourself a Farm", and the organization managed to achieve a wave of 55,000 petitions from Americans calling on Congress to open up free public lands to homesteaders, which lead to the successful Homestead Act of 1862.

In his 1846 pamphlet Vote Yourself a Farm, George Henry Evans writes:

Vote Yourself a Farm and... Wealth would become a changed social element; it would then consist of the accumulated products of human labor, instead of a hoggish monopoly of the products of God's labor; and the antagonism of capital and labor would forever cease.

After George's death in 1856, the NRA was then managed by his younger brother and Shaker Elder Frederick William Evans. The movement had a stronghold of support in the Northeastern United States, especially in the State of New York where large tracts of land were owned by the Mount Lebanon Shaker Society.

== See also ==
- Single Tax Movement (1881-Present)
