= William Heighton =

American labor leader

William Heighton (1801 – 7 August 1871) was an English-American shoemaker who became the leader of the Philadelphia Working Man's Party.

Born in Northampton, England, Heighton emigrated as a young man. The Panic of 1819 accelerated the process of subdividing manufacturing and increasing industrialization. Unskilled workers filled the factories, pushing skilled workers away and bringing longer hours and smaller wages to all. William Heighton organized the skilled journeyman into the Mechanics' Union of Trade Associations (MUTA). MUTA was the first citywide organization of journeymen in America. MUTA successfully used strikes to improve wages and hours for journeymen. This organization greatly improved worker influence and rights for skilled workers; however, Heighton's organization did not help, in fact purposefully hurt, women, children, blacks, and unskilled workers, who were viewed as a threat to journeymen.

Heighton's involvement with labor also led to his founding of the Mechanic's Free Press, a newspaper designed to speak on behalf of the workers. He served as the paper's editor and advocated for workers' rights by writing editorials.

Heighton was the portrait of a self-made man. He was an English immigrant who became a wage-working shoemaker, who later became a leader of men, and a celebrity. Heighton was greatly influenced by John Gray.
