= American Freedmen's Inquiry Commission =

1863–64 U.S. investigation into status of freed slaves

The American Freedmen's Inquiry Commission was charged by U.S. secretary of war Edwin McMasters Stanton in March 1863 with investigating the status of the slaves and former slaves who were freed by the Emancipation Proclamation. Stanton appointed Dr. Samuel Gridley Howe, James McKaye, and Robert Dale Owen as commissioners, all three of whom served from the creation of the committee in 1863 through to their submission of its final report in May 1864.

== Background ==
Commission members and staff traveled to the American South, where they interviewed former slaves and Union field commanders to get a better grasp of the situation and of the "condition and capacity" of freed slaves. Howe and his secretary also traveled to Canada West, where thousands of former slaves had settled after gaining freedom in Canada. He visited their communities, interviewed freedmen and government officials, and noted their progress in a free country where they were enfranchised and their rights protected by the government.

Through its report, the Commission recommended that the government help support freedmen through their transition to a free life. Their report was submitted to Congress and its findings debated. Its recommendations contributed to the passage by Congress of a bill authorizing formation of the Freedmen's Bureau, to help manage the transition of freedmen to freedom.

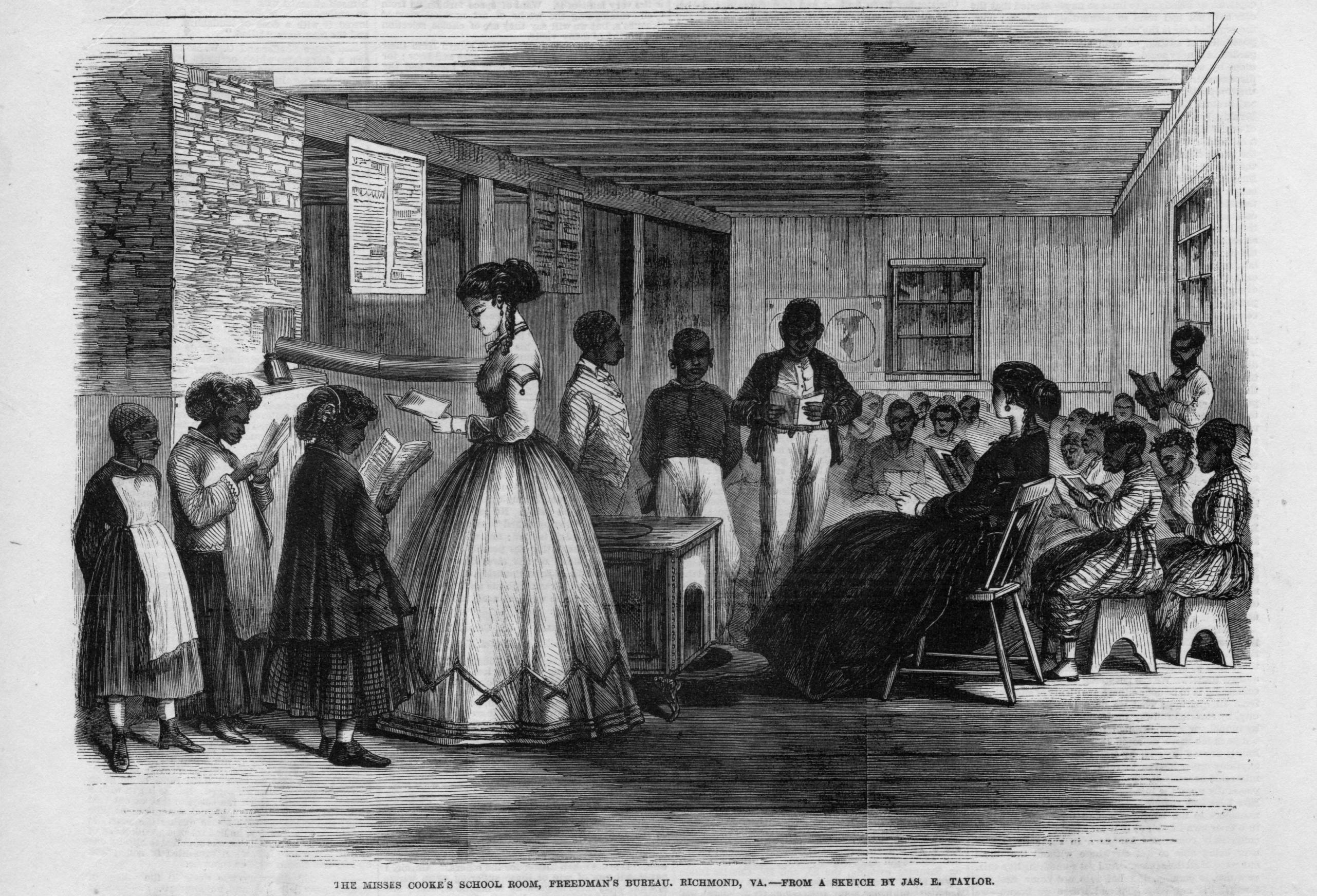

The Commission used Federal money to establish schools and churches in the South in an attempt to employ and educate former slaves. They helped to establish 1,600 day schools which eventually became 1,737 day and night schools with over 100,000 students and nearly 2,800 teachers by 1870. The commission's mission was successful, and the bill's life was extended in Congress in January 1866.

Included in its reporting of the dire conditions faced by many freedmen in the South, the Commission reported that there had been instances of Union Army soldiers stealing from already poverty stricken African American "contrabands" in Virginia. The following documents the looting:

In connection with the probabilities of our obtaining the above number of colored troops, it is the duty of the Commission to report the fact that, in too many cases, not injustice only but robbery and other crimes have been committed against fugitives on first entering our lines. As an example: the Assistant Superintendent at Suffolk, Virginia, informed the Commission that instances had come to his knowledge of pickets who sometimes kept refugees until their masters came for them, and sometimes sent them back, pocketing the reward; the examples, however, of this offence were not numerous. He stated further, that, “in hundreds of cases,” the refugees had been robbed by the pickets, chiefly of money, but occasionally of other articles. Valuable horses, too, and other property, were taken from them by the Quartermaster, without remuneration to the refugee who brought them in.

The report fully described the poverty and difficult conditions of most former slaves in the South, as aspects of the society. Some members of Congress found it hard to believe that such conditions existed in the United States.

Robert Dale Owen later re-published the full final report as a book titled The Wrong of Slavery, the Right of Emancipation, and the Future of the African Race in the United States.

While the Commissions political influence was adequate it proposes programs such as the Freedmen's Bureau, the full integration of African Americans, the descendants of African American slaves as well, and the enlistment of about 300,000 black soldiers.

The commission was also put in the middle of both the freedman and planters when job contracts were being drawn up. They had to make sure both parties were content and had equality between the two. Many freedman were worried about going back and working under slave owners and wanted to ensure after signing papers that their rights were insured and they were going to be treated correctly. The planters complained about how there weren't enough restrictions and how they couldn't use punishments like they did in the past. In the end these contracts were very controversial and said to be very detailed for both parties.

== AFIC Surveys ==
Commissioners would interview escaped slaves, as well as visit contraband camps that gave insight on the African Americans' new living conditions. The findings of these interviews would provide the basis for how the government would help enslaved southerners gain freedom and equality.

Since the Freedmen’s Inquiry Commission was tasked with investigating the conditions and needs of Freedmen within union lines, their findings influenced government decisions and policies for providing relief and assistance to freed slaves in the postwar years. The relief and assistance included rations which was enough corn meal, flour and sugar for a weeks worth of food for one person. However because of others taking advantage of this that both needed it and didn't it was cut off by fall of 1866. Also healthcare that was provided gave assistance to outbreaks in the aspects of containing and preventing them through relocations and better quarantines of black people.

Overall, the surveys showed the valuable contributions African Americans added to their communities, but also showed the commission’s disregard by ignoring influential evidence that would increase the number of African Americans in the North. Some findings on surveys of Northern blacks were made to seem So getting freedom for African Americans in the south relied on their surveys not being screwed with by commissioners with prejudice, racial, and social bias.

== Critics and Misconceptions ==
Although the Freedmen's Bureau was an active pioneering federal agency that assisted enslaved southerners assert their rights, they received backlash from them. Southerners blamed the labor strife on the bureau and felt that commissioners were driving a bigger wedge between them and other races with their reports.

The bureau’s goal was to change the beliefs associated with slavery, as well as help African Americans settle North. Despite the AFIC restoring stability to the southern economy, formally enslaved southerners felt their rehabilitation was controlled and critiqued the reconstruction.

== Bibliography ==
- Dr. Samuel Gridley Howe, Refugees from Slavery in Canada West: Report to the Freedmen's Inquiry Commission, (Boston: Wright and Potter, Printers, 1864/reprint Arno Press, 1969), available as e-text online
- Owen, Robert Dale, James McKaye, and Samuel G. Howe. Preliminary Report Touching the Condition and Management of Emancipated Refugees; Made to the Secretary of War, by the American Freedmen's Inquiry Commission, June 30, 1863. New York, NY: John F. Trow, 1863.
- FRANKEL, OZ. “The Predicament of Racial Knowledge: Government Studies of the Freedmen during the U.S. Civil War.” Social Research, vol. 70, no. 1, 2003, pp. 45–81, https://doi.org/10.1353/sor.2003.0023.
- Reidy, Joseph P. (2024-06-18). "The Freedmen's Bureau", Oxford Research Encyclopedia of American History, https://oxfordre.com/americanhistory/display/10.1093/acrefore/9780199329175.001.0001/acrefore-9780199329175-e-1037
- Beard, Rick. (2013-03-18). "Surveying Emancipation" https://archive.nytimes.com/opinionator.blogs.nytimes.com/2013/03/18/surveying-emancipation/
- Strickland, Jeff. 2019. “The American Freedmen’s Inquiry Commission, 19th- ...” Montclair State University Digital Commons. https://digitalcommons.montclair.edu/cgi/viewcontent.cgi?article=1015&context=history-facpubs
