= New York Daily Sentinel =

One of the first daily newspapers in the United States

- Founders: Benjamin Day; Willoughby Lynde; William J. Stanley
- Publisher: Andrews and Stanley
- Founded: February 15, 1830
- Ceased publication: March 11, 1833

The New York Daily Sentinel, founded in 1830, was one of the first daily newspapers in the United States. It was founded by Benjamin Day, Willoughby Lynde, and William J. Stanley. Its publishers were Lynde, Stanley & Co., the Association of Working Men, and George H. Evans.

== History ==
At the time of establishing the New York Daily Sentinel, Day had just one year of experience working for commercial newspapers. Day wanted the paper to be available to as many people as possible, and formally established the Sentinel in 1830, with a low start-up cost supported by Lynde and Stanley. Lynde and Stanley would later launch The New York Transcript in 1834, the year after the Sentinel ceased publication.

The Sentinel aligned itself with the tenets of the New York Working Men's Party, which advocated for the rights of working class New Yorkers, particularly through the use of the press to disseminate knowledge.

The New York Daily Sentinel ceased publication on March 11, 1833. Day subsequently founded another newspaper, The Sun, with the motto, "It shines for everyone". By the middle of the 19th century, The Sun was the most widely circulated American newspaper, and, priced at one cent per copy, it was part of what became known in New York City as the Penny Press. George Henry Evans, founder of The Man and inspiration for the Homestead Act of 1862, eventually bought the paper from Day.
