= Frederick William Evans =

American Shaker writer

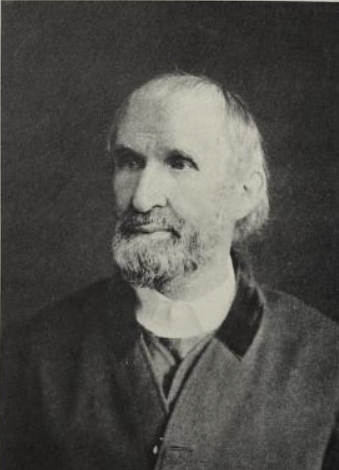
- Born: 9 June 1808; Leominster
- Died: 6 March 1893 (aged 84); New Lebanon, New York
- Occupation: Shaker writer

Frederick William Evans (9 June 1808 – 6 March 1893) was a Shaker writer who served as an elder in the Mount Lebanon Shaker Society for many years. Evans was the younger brother of the land reformer George Henry Evans.

== Biography ==
Evans was born in Leominster, England. His father settled in the United States in 1820, and apprenticed him to a hatter in New York. A diligent student in his leisure hours, Evans was attracted by the theories of Robert Dale Owen and Charles Fourier. After a brief return to Britain, he joined the Shaker community. He became the Presiding Elder in 1858. He died in New Lebanon, New York.

Evans was a vegetarian for sixty years.

== Works ==
- Tests of Divine Revelation (1853)
- Compendium (1859)
- Ann Lee (The Founder of the Shakers): A Biography (1869)
- Shaker Communism (1871)
- Autobiography of a Shaker (1888)
