= Locofocos =

Short-lived United States Democratic Party faction

The Locofocos were the radical faction of the New York Democratic Party in the United States that existed from 1835 until the mid-1840s. They differed from their more moderate, Tammany-backed opponents, whom they frequently derided as "Monopoly Democrats".

== History ==
The faction, originally named the Equal Rights Party, was formed in New York City as a protest against the city's regular Democratic organization, Tammany Hall. It consisted of a coalition of anti-Tammany Democrats and labor union veterans of the Working Men's Party, which had existed from 1828 to 1830. The group advocated for laissez-faire policies and opposed monopolies. Its leading intellectual figure was editorial writer William Leggett.

The name Locofoco derived from "locofoco," a type of friction match. It originated when a group of Jacksonians used such matches to light candles in order to continue a political meeting after Tammany supporters attempted to break it up by turning off the gaslights.

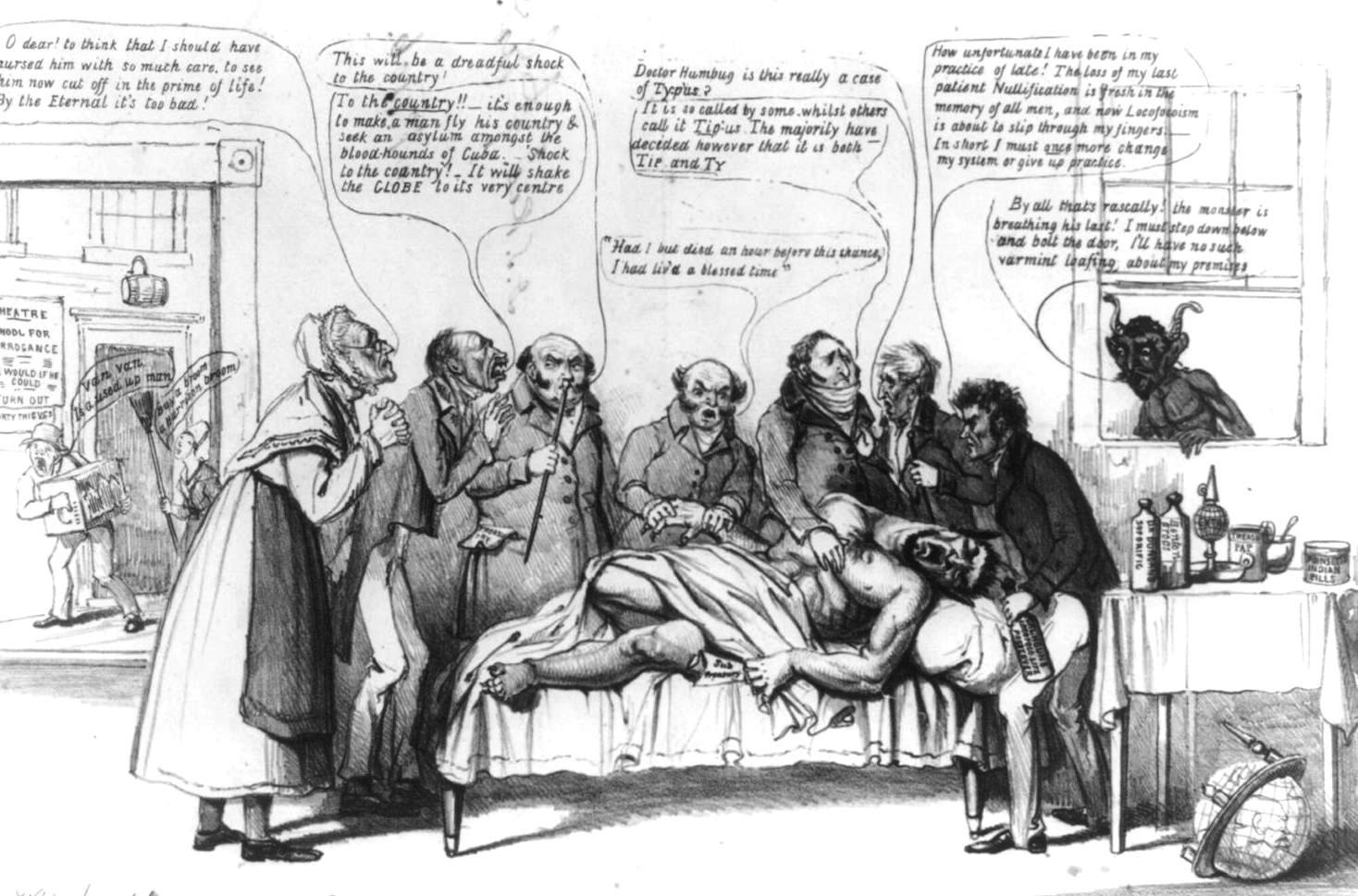
Cartoon celebrating defeat of Locofocoism, 1840

The Locofocos were involved in the Flour Riot of 1837. In February of that year, they held a mass meeting in New York City's City Hall Park to protest the rising cost of living. When the crowd learned that flour had been hoarded at warehouses on the Lower East Side, hundreds rushed to the warehouses, leading to the arrest of 53 people. The New York State Assembly blamed the Locofocos for the unrest and opened an investigation into the group.

The faction never gained control of the Democratic Party nationally and declined after 1840, when the federal government passed the Independent Treasury Act. The legislation ensured that the government would not resume its involvement in banking, a key demand of the faction. During the 1840 election, Whig opponents applied the term Locofoco to the entire Democratic Party, both because Democratic President Martin Van Buren had incorporated many Locofoco ideas into his economic policy, and because the Whigs considered the term derogatory.

In general, the Locofocos supported Andrew Jackson and Van Buren. They advocated free trade, greater circulation of specie, and legal protections for labor unions, while opposing paper money, financial speculation, and state banks. Notable members of the faction included William Leggett, William Cullen Bryant, Alexander Ming Jr., John Commerford, Levi D. Slamm, Abram D. Smith, Henry K. Smith, Isaac S. Smith, Moses Jacques, Gorham Parks, and Walt Whitman, who at the time was a newspaper editor.

Ralph Waldo Emerson described the Locofocos as follows: "The new race is stiff, heady, and rebellious; they are fanatics in freedom; they hate tolls, taxes, turnpikes, banks, hierarchies, governors, yea, almost all laws."

== Canada ==
=== William Lyon Mackenzie ===
Locofocoism influenced Canadian politics through William Lyon Mackenzie. Mackenzie, a newspaper publisher and parliamentarian, became sympathetic to the movement after meeting Andrew Jackson in 1829. Frustrated by Tory dominance in Canadian politics, he led the Upper Canada Rebellion of 1837 and proclaimed a short-lived "Republic of Canada" during the Patriot War, with support from American militias. Locofoco Abram Smith and others became active in American Hunters' Lodges, which sought to end British rule in Canada.

Mackenzie was imprisoned for violating the Neutrality Act during the Patriot War, but pressure from sympathetic Locofocos and other supporters led President Martin Van Buren to pardon him in 1840. Mackenzie later became an American citizen and a Locofoco politician before eventually returning to Canada.

== Origin of name ==
The term Loco-foco was originally used by John Marck for a self-igniting cigar, which he patented in April 1834. Marck, an immigrant, coined the name by combining the Latin prefix loco-—which, as part of the word locomotive, had recently entered common usage and was often misinterpreted to mean "self"—with a misspelling of the Italian word fuoco ("fire"). Marck's intended meaning for the name was "self-firing." The term was soon generalized to refer to any self-igniting match, and it was from this usage that the political faction derived its name.

The Whigs quickly adopted the term as a political epithet, offering an alternative derivation from the Spanish word loco ("mad" or "crack-brained") and foco (from focus or fuego, meaning "fire"). In this interpretation, the name suggested that the faction—and later the Democratic Party as a whole—was the "focus of folly." The use of Locofoco as a derogatory label for Democrats persisted into the 1850s, even after the dissolution of the Whig Party and the formation of the Republican Party, which drew support from former urban Workingmen Locofocos, anti-slavery Know Nothings, Free Soilers, Conscience Whigs, and Temperance Whigs.

== See also ==
- Specie Circular
- Preserved Fish
- Young America Movement
