= The Wrong of Slavery, the Right of Emancipation, and the Future of the African Race in the United States =

1864 book by Robert Dale Owen

The Wrong of Slavery, the Right of Emancipation, and the Future of the African Race in the United States is a book written in 1864 by Robert Dale Owen. He was appointed by Secretary Edwin Stanton to work on the American Freedmen's Inquiry Commission tasked with investigating the condition of freedmen of African descent, together with Samuel Gridley Howe and James McKaye. The book is based on the Inquiry Commission's report and argues for emancipation of slaves, including the constitutionality of emancipation. Several chapters lay out the history of transportation of slaves out of Africa, the role of enslavement of Native Americans in the United States, and the reciprocal societal influence of each race on the other.
