= Committee of Fifty (1893) =

American think tank

for others with the same name, see Committee of Fifty (disambiguation)

The Committee of Fifty was formed in 1893 by a group of American businessmen and scholars to investigate problems associated with the use and abuse of alcoholic beverages. The committee was chaired by prominent New York City lawyer Joseph Larocque, and included figures such as the leading physiologist of the time, Harvard's Henry Pickering Bowditch, and educator, Progressive reformer, and future mayor of New York City, Seth Low.

It attempted to use contemporary social scientific methods to study the subject in an amoral manner, in contrast to the temperance movement. Financed by private subscription, the composition of the committee left "little or no doubt about the seriousness of the eastern corporate community in the matter of the political control of liquor."

After many sub-committee investigations, the committee concluded that occasional and regular moderate drinking did not cause health problems, that drinking did not inevitably lead to drunkenness as temperance activists contended, and that alcohol education should be based on a recognition that "intoxication is not the wine's fault, but the man's".

The committee was especially critical of the Woman's Christian Temperance Union's education program, "Scientific Temperance Instruction". After reviewing the results of three studies of Scientific Temperance Instruction practice and outcomes, the committee concluded that "under the name of Scientific Temperance Instruction' there has been grafted upon the public school system of nearly all our States an educational scheme relating to alcohol which is neither scientific, nor temperate, nor instructive".

The Woman's Christian Temperance Union and its Superintendent of Scientific Temperance Instruction, Mary Hunt, strongly objected to the committee's conclusions about its programs and activities.
