= Thomas Skidmore (reformer) =

Title page of Thomas Skidmore's seminal 1829 book, The Rights of Man to Property!

Thomas Skidmore (August 13, 1790 – August 7, 1832) was an American politician and political philosopher. He is remembered as the co-founder and leader of the Working Men's Party in New York when it first emerged in the fall of 1829. He was forced out of the organization shortly after its initial electoral campaign by moderate party leaders on the grounds of "excessive radicalism and unbending personality". Skidmore went on to establish another short-lived political organization in 1830, known as the Agrarian Party.

Skidmore was the author of three books, including the 1829 political treatise written against the ideas of Thomas Jefferson, The Rights of Man to Property! which depicted a two-class society consisting of a propertied ruling class and a propertyless majority inevitably subjected to a sort of economic slavery which made true liberty impossible. It advocated a constitutional convention to abolish debt, end the right of inheritance, and bring about an equal distribution of productive and personal property of the nation among its adult citizens.

== Biography ==
=== Early years ===
Thomas Skidmore was born on August 13, 1790, in rural Connecticut, in the town of Newtown, located in Fairfield County. Intelligent and literate from an early age, Skidmore began teaching at the local school at the age of thirteen, continuing in that capacity for five years. During this interval, Skidmore moved from town to town in pursuit of employment, including stops in Princeton and Bordentown, New Jersey; Richmond, Virginia; and Edenton and Newbern, North Carolina.

After working as a teacher in Connecticut, Skidmore relocated to Wilmington, Delaware, and then to Philadelphia, to try his hand as an amateur inventor. There he worked on a variety of ideas, including improvements to the gunpowder and paper manufacturing processes.

Skidmore moved to New York City in 1819, where he spent the rest of his life. He married in 1821 and worked in the city as a machinist, gradually becoming involved in labor politics.

=== Political career ===
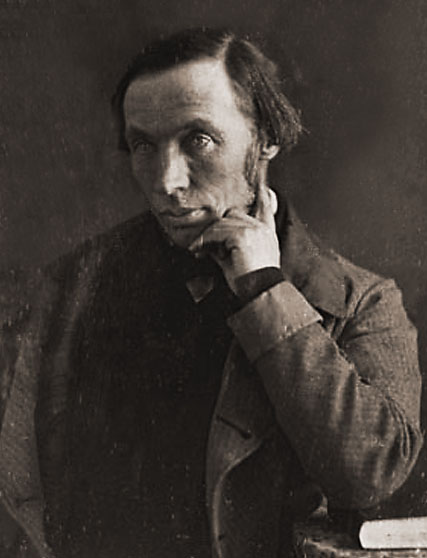
Skidmore's nemesis in the ranks of the Working Men's Party was Robert Dale Owen (1801–1877), an advocate of communal education of children.

In 1829, he emerged as an important public figure at the center of the nascent New York City Working Men's Party, which fought for a ten-hour working day, the abolition of debtors' prison, universal public education, and among other topics and activities, expanded political suffrage.

Skidmore's political ideas were considered radical for his time and brought him into conflict with others in the Working Men's Party whose members embraced more moderate views. His thinking on inheritance and redistribution was high on the party's agenda during the successful electoral campaign of 1829, which won 31% of the vote and elected two state legislators under the party's banner.

Soon however, the combative Skidmore provoked a reaction leading to his exclusion from the Working Men's Party. Previously critical of influential party leader Robert Dale Owen and others for their promotion of policies not of direct benefit to the working class, Skidmore found himself isolated in December 1829 when Owen joined prominent party politicians Noah Cook and Henry Guyon in seeking his removal, accusing him of excessive radicalism.

Skidmore's cause was not aided by his prickly personality. Political opponents of the day characterized him as arrogant, overbearing, and intolerant of dissent, while political allies considered him self-assured and unwilling to accede to the ideas of others which he believed to be incorrect. "All else is quackery," Skidmore is remembered as saying of perspectives which diverged from his own.

=== Ouster and establishment of a new party ===
As the year 1829 drew to a close, a meeting of "mechanics and other workingmen" was held in New York City on December 29 to set the future policy of the party. The meeting was chaired by prominent local politician and Skidmore foe Henry G. Guyon, who refused to allow Skidmore to speak. When Skidmore attempted to address the meeting without official sanction, he was howled down. Skidmore's agrarianism-oriented program was defeated and the communal education policies assigned primacy in the revised Working Men's Party program.

Denied access to the floor at the December 29, 1829, meeting and thereby effectively "read out" of the party, Thomas Skidmore and his co-thinkers called a preparatory meeting soon thereafter, with a formal organizational meeting for a new political organization following on February 23, 1830. About 40 party adherents were in attendance to hear a long argument between Skidmore and Working Man's Advocate publisher Evans in which Skidmore charged that the official party had come to be dominated by the wealthy, while Evans accused Skidmore of having made himself "obnoxious to the great body of workingmen."

Skidmore's new grouping was known as the Agrarian Party, which also called itself the "Original Working Men's Party." They nominated a full ticket for state as well as city office, including running Skidmore for United States Congress and his right-hand man, Alexander Ming, Sr., for State Assembly in the election of 1830. The party nominated an individual from Orange County for governor, but he declined and no replacement was chosen.

The result of the 1830 election was a crushing blow for the Working Men's Party dominated by Owen and Evans and Skidmore's Agrarian Party alike. The Working Man's Party had split again into a National Republican proxy "Clay Workingmen" and an Owen-Evans minority. Both were soundly demolished by the Tammany Hall Democrats, with Skidmore's Agrarian Party scarcely registering a pulse.

=== Ideas ===
Skidmore's contribution to the political movement of the late 1820s and early 1830s was primarily that of a political writer. He published three books during the short interval between his emergence as a political figure in 1829 and his premature death at the age of 41 in 1832. Regarded as the most important of these was his first book, The Rights of Man to Property!

Influenced by the most radical thinking to emerge from the French Revolution of 1789–1794, Skidmore's book was a challenge to the views of Thomas Jefferson regarding the "rights of man" and Jefferson's call for "life, liberty, and the pursuit of happiness" for what he believed to be a shortsighted omission of the role of property in subverting political and judicial equality between citizens.

Anticipating the views of Karl Marx and others, in his 1829 book Skidmore depicted the world as one divided into two fundamental classes:

"...proprietors, and non-proprietors; those who own the world and those who own no part of it. If we take a closer view of these two classes, we shall find that a very great proportion even of the proprietors, are only nominally so; they possess so little, that in strict regard to truth, they ought to be classed among the non-proprietors."

Such a situation was self-perpetuating and held the majority of citizens in a sort of economic thralldom in which true liberty was not possible, Skidmore argued. He wrote:

"Let the parent reflect, if he now be a man of toil, that his children must be, 99 cases in 100, slaves, and worse, to some rich proprietor... Let him not cheat himself with empty pretensions; for, he who commands the property of the State, or even an inordinate portion of it, has the liberty and the happiness of its citizens in his own keeping.... He who can feed me, or starve me; give me employment, or bid me wander about in idleness; is my master; and it is the utmost folly for me to boast of being anything but a slave."

To alleviate this fundamentally flawed state of affairs, Skidmore argued for the end of the right of inheritance and for a one-time equalization of property among adults. His program was straightforward: all property in New York should be divvied up and redistributed, in equal shares, to New York citizens. From that point on, New Yorkers would own their share as private property, and would relinquish it only when they died. Private inheritance would be abolished, and the wealth of the deceased would be pooled into a fund and reserved, in the future, for young people when they reached the age of 18. Upon reaching that age, all New Yorkers would inherit a generous sum of money, understood as their birthright, to get them started in adult life.

The mechanism for change advocated by Skidmore was the convocation of a state constitutional convention that would in one swoop abolish all debts and expropriate all property — productive and personal — on behalf of the state. Every citizen, regardless of gender or race, would be allotted an equal share of the combined property of the nation, with the system made permanent by the equal distribution of the property of the deceased to those attaining the age of majority.

In addition to his redistributive ideas, Skidmore advocated state aid for child-rearing, the abolition of private charity, and the elimination of banks and corporate charters.

=== Death and legacy ===
During the last months before defeat in the election of 1830 and his untimely death in the summer of 1832, Skidmore published a newspaper called The Friend of Equal Rights, wrote letters to the editor of various New York City newspapers, and gave public lectures in an attempt to gain popular support for his deeply-held political and economic ideas.

Thomas Skidmore died August 7, 1832, during the cholera epidemic that swept through the city in that year. He was one week shy of his 42nd birthday at the time of his death.

Skidmore's 1829 book has been called the "first American synthesis of egalitarian and producerist ideas" and notable for its early advocacy of the idea that the producers of wealth were entitled to the whole value of that product — a fundamental economic article of faith which drove the 19th Century international socialist movement.

== Works ==
- The Rights of Man to Property! - Being a Proposition to Make It Equal Among the Adults of the Present Generation, and to Provide for Its Equal Transmission to Every Individual of Each Succeeding Generation on Arriving at the Age of Maturity. New York: Thomas Skidmore, 1829.
- Moral Physiology Exposed and Refuted. New York: Skidmore and Jacobs, 1831.
- Political Essays. New York: Skidmore and Jacobs, 1831.
