= Grotesquerie =

Genre of horror literature

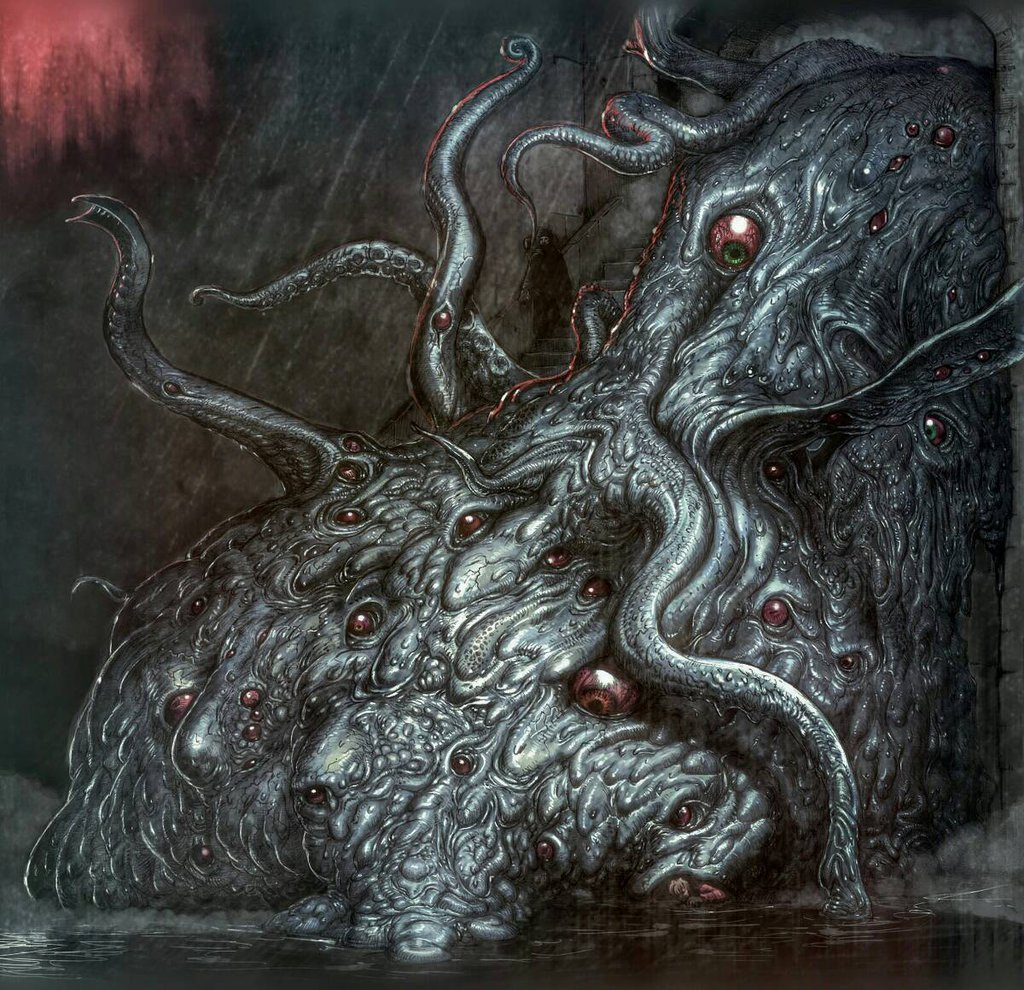
Depiction of a shoggoth from the works of H.P. Lovecraft

Grotesquerie is a literary form that became a popular genre in the early 20th century. It is characterized by using the grotesque in its work (i.e., the work uses people or animal forms that are distorted or misshapen) for comedic effect or in order to repulse. It can be grouped with science fiction and horror. Authors such as Ambrose Bierce, Fritz Leiber, H.P. Lovecraft, H. Russell Wakefield, Seabury Quinn, Mary Elizabeth Counselman, Margaret St. Clair, Stanton A. Coblentz, Lee Brown Coye and Katherine Anne Porter have written books within this genre.

The term has also been used to describe macabre artwork and movies, and it is used in architecture.

== See also ==
- Gothic novel
- Grotesque body
- Body horror
- Cosmicism
- Weird fiction
- Dark fantasy
