= William Leggett (writer) =

American writer (1801–1839)

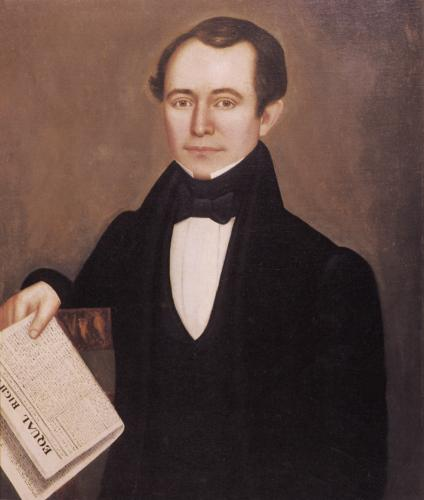
- Born: April 30, 1801; New York City
- Died: May 29, 1839 (aged 38); New Rochelle, New York
- Occupations: Poet, fiction writer, journalist

William Leggett (April 30, 1801 – May 29, 1839) was an American poet, fiction writer, and journalist.

== Life ==
William Leggett's father was Major Abraham Leggett, who served in the Continental Army from 1776–1783. Modern-day Leggett Street in The Bronx is named after Abraham. William's mother, Catherine Wiley (1784–1839) of New Rochelle, was Major Leggett's second wife. The couple had 9 children, of which William was the 8th.

Leggett attended Georgetown College in 1815–16. In 1819, after his father's business failed, he moved with his family to Edwardsville, Illinois. In late 1822, he returned to New York to take up a naval commission as a midshipman. He served in the United States Navy in the West Indies and Mediterranean.

In January 1825, Leggett was imprisoned by his captain for dueling on duty. Several months later, a court martial convicted him of several offenses. His sentence of dismissal from the navy was reduced to time served, but he resigned his commission on April 17, 1826.

After his resignation, Leggett returned to New York to become a theater critic at the New York Mirror and assistant editor of the short-lived Merchants' Telegraph. In November 1828, he founded the Critic, a literary journal that lasted only until June 1829. In the summer of 1829, however, William Cullen Bryant invited Leggett to write for the New York Evening Post. There, in addition to literary and drama reviews, he began to write political editorials. Leggett became an owner and editor at the Post in 1831, eventually working as sole editor of the newspaper while Bryant traveled in Europe in 1834–5.

Leggett's political opinions proved highly controversial. He was a Jacksonian Democrat, but he often attacked fellow Andrew Jackson supporters for failing to carry their egalitarian principles far enough. He also became an outspoken opponent of slavery. Because the resulting struggles threatened both Leggett's health and the financial survival of the newspaper, Bryant returned from Europe, and Leggett left the Post. Leggett founded The Plaindealer in 1836 and the Examiner in 1837, but both publications lasted only a few months. Their failure left Leggett in poverty.

Leggett had suffered poor health since contracting yellow fever in the navy. He died at his home in New Rochelle, New York on May 29, 1839, just before he was due to begin serving as the American minister to Guatemala under Martin Van Buren. He is interred at New Rochelle's Trinity Church. His monument there was carved by John Frazee.

He was quoted as having said:

AND he who's doomed o'er waves to roam,
Or wander on a foreign strand,
Will sigh whene'r he thinks of home
And better love his native land.

== Positions ==
He is best known as an unflinching advocate of laissez-faire, and a leader of the Loco-Focos faction of city Democrats. He insisted:

Governments have no right to interfere with the pursuits of individuals, as guaranteed by those general laws, by offering encouragements and granting privileges to any particular class of industry, or any select bodies of men, inasmuch as all classes of industry and all men are equally important to the general welfare, and equally entitled to protection.

Leggett was remarkable among the journalists of his day as an unflinching advocate of freedom of opinion for his political opponents as well as for his own party. Bryant wrote a poem to his memory, beginning "The earth may ring from shore to shore." Bryant describes Leggett as fond of study, delighting to trace principles to their remotest consequences, and having no fear of public opinion regarding the expression of his own convictions. It was the fiery Leggett that urged on Bryant to attack William Leete Stone, Sr., a brother editor, in Broadway. Soon afterward he fought a duel at Weehawken with Blake, the treasurer of the old Park Theatre. To the surprise of all New York, Leggett selected James Lawson, a peacefully disposed Scottish-American poet, who was slightly lame, as his second; and when asked after the bloodless duel for his reasons, he answered: "Blake's second, Berkeley, was lame, and I did not propose that the d--d Englishman should beat me in anything."

William Cullen Bryant, in his obituary, wrote:

As a political writer, Mr. Leggett attained, within a brief period, a high rank and an extensive and enviable reputation. He wrote with great fluency and extraordinary vigor; he saw the strong points of a question at a glance, and had the skill to place them before his readers with a force, clearness and amplitude of statement rarely to be found in the writings of any journalist that ever lived. When he became warmed with his subject, which was not unfrequently the case, his discussions had all the stirring power of extemporaneous eloquence.

His fine endowments he wielded for worthy purposes. He espoused the cause of the largest liberty and the most comprehensive equality of rights among the human race, and warred against those principles which inculcate distrust of the people, and those schemes of legislation which tend to create an artificial inequality in the conditions of men. He was wholly free – and, in this respect his example ought to be held up to journalists as a model to contemplate and copy – he was wholly free from the besetting sin of their profession, a mercenary and time-serving disposition. He was a sincere lover and follower of truth, and never allowed any of those specious reasons for inconsistency, which disguise themselves under the name of expediency, to seduce him for a moment from the support of the opinions which he deemed right, and the measures which he was convinced were just. What he would not yield to the dictates of interest he was still less disposed to yield to the suggestions of fear.

We sorrow that such a man, so clear-sighted, strong minded and magnanimous has passed away, and that his aid is no more to be given in the conflict which truth and liberty maintain with their numerous and powerful enemies.

== Views on race and slavery ==
In an 1834 writing, Leggett defended African Americans and believed that they had rights but opposed Abolitionism in the United States. The 1834 writing is an article titled "RIOT AT THE CHATHAM-STREET CHAPEL" in which Leggett wrote that, "The morning papers contain accounts of a riot at Chatham-street chapel last evening, between a party of whites and a party of blacks. The story is told in the morning journals in very inflammatory language, and the whole blame is cast upon the negroes; yet it seems to us, from those very statements themselves, that, as usual, there was fault on both sides, and more especially on that of the whites." In the same article he wrote that, "we think readers of candid and temperate minds will perceive that the blame of this disgraceful transaction lies more with the white persons concerned in it, than with their coloured antagonists." In the 1834 article he also wrote, "That the whole scheme of immediate emancipation, and of promiscuous intermarriage of the two races, is preposterous, and revolting alike to common sense and common decency, we shall be ever ready, on all occasions, to maintain. Still, this furnishes no justification for invading the undoubted rights of the blacks, or violating the public peace" and later says "The plans of the Colonization Society are rational and practicable; those of the enthusiasts who advocate immediate and unconditional emancipation wholly wild and visionary" with Leggett seeming to be referring to the American Colonization Society.

In a later article in 1837, Leggett expressed more radical views on slavery:

The insolence of the abolitionists, in the case here adduced, owed its insufferableness to its truth. While the people are told that the spirit of the federal compact forbids every attempt to promote the emancipation of three millions of fellow-beings, held in abject and cruel bondage, and that even the free discussion of the question of slavery is a sin against the Union, a "reckless disregard of consequences" deserving the fiercest punishment which "popular indignation" can suggest, we are forced to consider the emblem of our federal union a cloak for slavery and a banner devoted to the cause of the most hateful oppression. The oppression which our fathers suffered from Great Britain was nothing in comparison with that which the negroes experience at the hands of the slaveholders. It may be "abolition insolence" to say these things; but as they are truths which justice and humanity authorize us to speak, we shall not be too dainty to repeat them whenever a fitting occasion is presented. Every American who, in any way, authorizes or countenances slavery is derelict to his duty as a christian, a patriot, and a man. Everyone does countenance and authorize it, who suffers any opportunity of expressing his deep abhorrence of its manifold abominations to pass by unimproved. If the freemen of the north and west ould [sic] but speak out on this subject in such terms as their consciences prompt, we should soon have to rejoice in the complete enfranchisement of our negro brethren of the south. If an extensive and well-arranged insurrection of the blacks should occur in any of the slave states, we should probably see the freemen of this quarter of the country rallying around that "glorious emblem" which is so magniloquently spoken of in the foregoing extract, and marching beneath its folds to take sides with the slaveholders, and reduce the poor negroes, struggling for liberty, to heavier bondage than they endured before. It may be "abolition insolence" to call this "glorious emblem" the standard of oppression, but, at all events, it is unanswerable truth. For our part, we call it so in a spirit, not of insolence, not of pride speaking in terms of petulant contempt, but of deep humility and abasement. We confess, with the keenest mortification and chagrin, that the banner of our country is the emblem, not of justice and freedom, but of oppression; that it is the symbol of a compact which recognizes, in palpable and outrageous contradiction of the great principle of liberty, the right of one man to hold another as property; and that we are liable at any moment to be required, under all our obligations of citizenship, to array ourselves beneath it, and wage a war, of extermination if necessary, against the slave, for no crime but asserting his right of equal humanity—the self-evident truth that all men are created equal, and have an unalienable right of life, liberty, and the pursuit of happiness. Would we comply with such a requisition? No! rather would we see our right arm lopped from our body, and the mutilated trunk itself gored with mortal wounds, than raise a finger in opposition to men struggling in the holy cause of freedom. The obligations of citizenship are strong, but those of justice, humanity and religion stronger. We earnestly trust that the great contest of opinion which is now going on in this country may terminate in the enfranchisement of the slaves, without recourse to the strife of blood; but should the oppressed bondmen, impatient of the tardy progress of truth urged only in discussion, attempt to burst their chains by a more violent and shorter process, they should never encounter our arm, nor hear our voice, in the ranks of their oppressors. We should stand a sad spectator of the conflict; and whatever commiseration we might feel for the discomfiture of the oppressors, we should pray that the battle might end in giving freedom to the oppressed.

Leggett also defended the rights of Irish Americans:

It will be well for our citizens, when they read the articles intended to excite in their minds feelings of jealousy and unkindness towards the Irish, to remember that there is no portion of our society more devotedly attached to the principles of human liberty than those against whom it is now sought to direct popular hostility. Indeed, the true and only motive of these attempts lies in this very circumstance. Had a majority of the Irish citizens supported the United States Bank in its audacious war upon the Government and the rights of the people, the minions of the Bank, the purchased slaves who conduct the Courier and the Star, would never have sought to stir up the popular enmity against them, and make them the victims of riot and violence.

On the rights of Native Americans, "Leggett explicitly included blacks and women. Yet he did exclude Native Americans; in 'The Rifle' he allowed his narrator the belief that Illinois prairies and forests were found by the settlers in a 'primeval nature . . . whose silence has not often been broken by the voice of man.'" In an 1834 article titled "CHARACTER OF ANDREW JACKSON" Leggett praised Andrew Jackson for fighting in, "battles of his country against the Indians" and praised Jackson by writing, "Was he a tyrant and usurper in recommending that an ample district of country in the far west should be given to the poor Indians who were discontented with their situation within the limits of Georgia?" A major part of the Presidency of Andrew Jackson was the Trail of Tears.

== Writings ==
Leggett's writings include Leisure Hours at Sea (1825); Tales and Sketches of a Country School Master (1835); Naval Stories (1835); and Political Writings, edited, with a preface, by Theodore Sedgwick (1840). Tales and Sketches of a Country School Master includes "The Rifle" (originally in The Atlantic Souvenir, Christmas and New Year's Offering [1827]), an early pre-Poe use of elements that would appear in detective fiction.

In "Reassessing Jacksonian Political Culture: William Leggett’s Egalitarianism" James Simeone wrote:

In 1834 he would publish Naval Stories. His writing to this point specialized in dramatic criticism, cautionary tales, and social commentary. The early writing does not cover the political scene per se, but it is filled with political opinions. He does not write as a Democrat on monetary policy, but his narrator condemns banks; he does not defend price graduation or donation of public lands, but his heroes embrace and thrive in the social equality of the frontier; he does not explicitly confront the rise of proslavery ideology, but his stories present Southerners as narrowly prejudiced and blacks as sympathetic and capable characters.

His main editorials have been collected as Democratick Editorials: Essays in Jacksonian Political Economy (1984)

== In popular culture ==
- Leggett appears in the novel Burr by Gore Vidal as a mentor to the main character, aspiring journalist Charlie Schuyler.
- A poem was written by John Greenleaf Whittier commemorating "Leggett's Monument" as a symbol of his consistently outspoken nature and the callousness of society to his opinions.
