= Levi D. Slamm =

American journalist

Levi D. Slamm (c. 1812 – October 6, 1862, Mamaroneck, New York) was an American labor leader, the editor of the Daily Plebeian, a radical Democrat and a leader of New York City's Locofocos.

Slamm was born in New York City, the son of a Revolutionary War veteran and a grocer. Slamm followed in his father's profession but eventually became a locksmith. As a young man in 1830, Slamm sailed aboard the Corvo from Boston under Capt. Jeremiah Spalding in August, together with Samuel Colt, the firearms inventor, and apparently they became fast friends. When the economic troubles of the 1830s began, he joined the Locofocos and soon became one of the most influential, in part through his publication of the radical periodical the Daily Plebeian. The New York Herald nicknamed the Locofocos "Slamm, Bang, and Company" in reference to Levi and another party leader, Henry Bangs. In 1838, together with Locofocos Alexander Ming Jr. and Charles Ferris, Slamm struck a deal with the Tammany Hall General Committee to adopt the entire Locofoco's radical Declaration of Rights, thus uniting the two halves of New York's Democratic Party that had been in schism since 1835.

Following this success, Slamm was appointed to be a purser in the United States Navy. Soon after his naval appointment Slamm married Jane E. Morsell in December, 1846. He died as a result of injuries received while boarding a ship in Montevideo.
