= Committee of 100 =

Committee of 100 may refer to:

- Committee of 100 (Finland), a Finnish anti-war group
- Committee of 100 (United Kingdom), a British anti-war group
- Committee of 100 (United States), a group of prominent Chinese Americans which addresses issues in Sino-American relations
- Committee of 100 sent as an advance lobby for the Poor People's Campaign (United States, 1968)
- Committee of 100 on the Federal City, a private, non-profit land-use organization in Washington, D.C.
- Committee of Sixty in New York was replaced by a Committee of One Hundred on May 1, 1775
