= Safety-valve institution =

Safety-valve organization or safety-valve institution is a term used in sociology to describe social organizations which serve to allow discontented individuals to act out their opposition to elements of society without coming into direct contact with the elements, analogically "letting off steam". Safety-valve organizations reduce tensions; in the structural-functionalist perspective, it can be said to have a tension-reducing latent function. Safety-valve organizations are outlets for behavior that is considered deviant but cannot be eradicated from society, and such organizations prevent tensions from accumulating; thus tolerance of some deviant behavior in various safety-valve organizations prevents more serious problems. Hence, a function of the deviant act itself can be said to be a primary safety-valve that, on a scale that is more individual and psychological, precedes contact with organizations that standardly engage in the same function.

== Examples ==
Safety-valve institutions range from mostly legal and reputable (strikes, arts, and sports), to less so (pranks, casinos and gambling institutions in general, pornography) to mostly illegal (prostitution). Societies of different kinds vary widely in the legal status of these activities. In their most extreme, aggression in general and war in particular have also been described as safety-valve institutions.

With regard to specific organizations, Better Business Bureau has been described as a safety valve institution, as it "mitigates conflicts between business and consumer". Safety-valve organizations can exist in politics, where they provide an outlet for those dissatisfied with the political and social situation to legally organize and discuss it. For example, Saugat K. Biswas notes that the Indian National Congress was such an organization in late 19th-century India. Moren-Alegret similarly discusses the Portuguese NGO Secretariado Coordenador das Acções de Legalização (Coordinating Secretariat for Legalization Actions, an immigrant association) in a similar context. As an example of mostly criminal safety-valve organizations, Farchild discusses the Japanese yakuza.

== See also ==
- Theories of humor
- Total institution
