= Committee of 19 =

The Committee of 19 is a committee of students at Auburn University that direct the War on Hunger efforts on campus and in the local community. In 2004, Auburn University was chosen by the World Food Programme, an agency of the United Nations and the largest humanitarian organization in the world, to lead the first student-led efforts in the War on Hunger. The number 19 in the title is symbolic of the 19 cents per day that it takes the World Food Programme to feed a hungry child in the developing world. Today, that number is estimated to be closer to twenty-five cents. There are currently 22 members on the Committee of 19, representing various student organizations and the university's colleges and schools.

== About the initiative ==
Vision

In partnership with the United Nations World Food Programme, Auburn University will be the catalyst for mobilizing universities across the nation and around the globe to create a grassroots student campaign to conquer world hunger and malnutrition. The focus of the campaign will also give momentum to local hunger initiatives.

"We believe in a world free of hunger. We believe every man, woman, and child has a right to the basic human need of food. We believe that the skills we learn in the classroom reach beyond the bounds of ourselves and have the power to influence the lives of others for good. We believe that uniting our unique knowledge, talents, and skill sets can produce powerful cooperation and promote sustainable, effective change. We believe collaboration on university, local, regional, national, and global levels is necessary to reach universal solutions in our globalized world. We believe that a world without hunger promotes well-being, increases productivity, embraces education, and proliferates peace. And because we believe these things, we have no choice but to take action."

Mission

The mission of the Committee of 19 shall be to develop and implement an action agenda for students that encompasses

- Hunger Awareness and Consciousness-raising
- Academic Initiatives
- Advocacy
- Fundraising

Through these facets, the Committee of 19 shall lead Auburn University and the local community in the effort to eliminate world hunger and malnutrition.

Goal

The goal of the Committee of 19 is to create a "War on Hunger" model that is suitable for replication by other universities across the nation and around the globe.

In December 2005, students and administrators from Auburn University presented the War on Hunger model at a meeting of the National Association of State Universities and Land-Grant Colleges. Following the positive response from the presentation, Auburn University hosted the War on Hunger Summit on the weekend of February 17–19, 2006. Representatives from twenty-nine universities were present to learn more about the Auburn University War on Hunger model. Guests at the conference included:

- Peter McPherson, President of the National Association of State Universities and Land-Grant Colleges
- Catherine Bertini, former Executive Director of the World Food Programme and World Food Prize winner
- Lauren Bush-Lauren, official spokesperson of the World Food Programme

The War on Hunger Summit returned to Auburn University's campus in 2013. The Auburn University Hotel and Conference Center hosted over a hundred students, professors, and administrators from multiple academic institutions.

== See also ==
- Food security
- Hunger
- ONE Campaign
