= Working Men's Party (Philadelphia) =

- Abbreviation: WMP
- Founded: 1828; 198 years ago
- Dissolved: 1831; 195 years ago
- Ideology: 10-hour working day
- Political position: Center-left

The Working Men's Party was a political organization established in Philadelphia, Pennsylvania in 1828 to promote candidates and policies of concern to the working class. After January 1829, the organization was also known as the Workingmen's Republican Political Association.

Emerging from the city's pioneer trade union federation, the Mechanics' Union of Trade Associations as its electoral arm, the Working Men's Party fielded candidates in the 1828-1831 elections before abruptly vanishing from the political scene.

The Philadelphia Working Men's Party was the first of approximately 60 independent workers parties to emerge in urban centers of the United States during the period 1828 to 1832. It is regarded as the first labor party to be established in the United States.

== History ==
=== Background ===
Map of Pennsylvania showing Philadelphia County in red.

The city of Philadelphia, Pennsylvania, with a population then approaching 80,000 people, saw the emergence of an organized labor movement in the year 1827. Prior to that year employers had hired and paid workers on the basis of the "sun to sun" day (sunrise to sunset) — a situation which meant comparatively short hours in the winter months but days extending to as many as 15 hours during the late spring and early summer. For some trades this worked out to a manageable average over the course of a year, but for the construction trades in particular, a business marked by heavy unemployment during the winter months owing to the weather, this state of affairs was regarded as an intolerable burden. As a result, the idea emerged that the length of the work day should be fixed by time rather than the rise and fall of the sun, and agitation for a 10-hour day was begun.

In June 1827 some 600 Philadelphia journeymen carpenters — that is, the wage laborers employed by master carpenters — went on strike for the citywide establishment of the 10-hour day. This demand was immediately rejected by the organized master carpenters as "inexpedient and altogether improper," with the masters arguing that 20% of the working day would be lost without compensation under the system. This battle was protracted and solidified the association of the "Journeymen House Carpenters," while arousing the attention of other building trades to fight for a similar shortening of the work day. Within weeks the journeymen house painters and glaziers and journeymen bricklayers had been motivated to organize themselves around the 10-hour day demand and a new weekly newspaper called the Journeymen Mechanics' Advocate seems to have emerged. (Note: Although reported in the press as forthcoming, no issues of the Journeymen Mechanics' Advocate have survived and therefore the fact of its existence remains unconfirmed. See: Sumner, pg. 189, fn. 6.)

Late in 1827, in order to win the 10-hour day, the construction trades of Philadelphia decided to join forces in a central federation called the Mechanics' Union of Trade Associations. The call for establishment of this federation extended a welcome to all other "trade societies" and individuals working in unorganized trades, inviting their dispatching of delegates to the new association as soon as possible.

Feeling isolated from the political process and unrepresented by elected officials, in May 1828 the Mechanics' Union of Trade Associations passed a resolution seeking the approval of its member unions to nominate a slate of candidates "to represent the interest of the working classes" in Philadelphia city and Pennsylvania state legislative races. This proposal was met warmly by the Philadelphia unions of carpenters, shoemakers, hat-makers, and other groups and at its regular July meeting the Mechanics' Union of Trade Associations adopted organizational rules for the nomination of candidates for the forthcoming 1828 elections. The groundwork for the Working Men's Party had been laid.

=== Formation ===
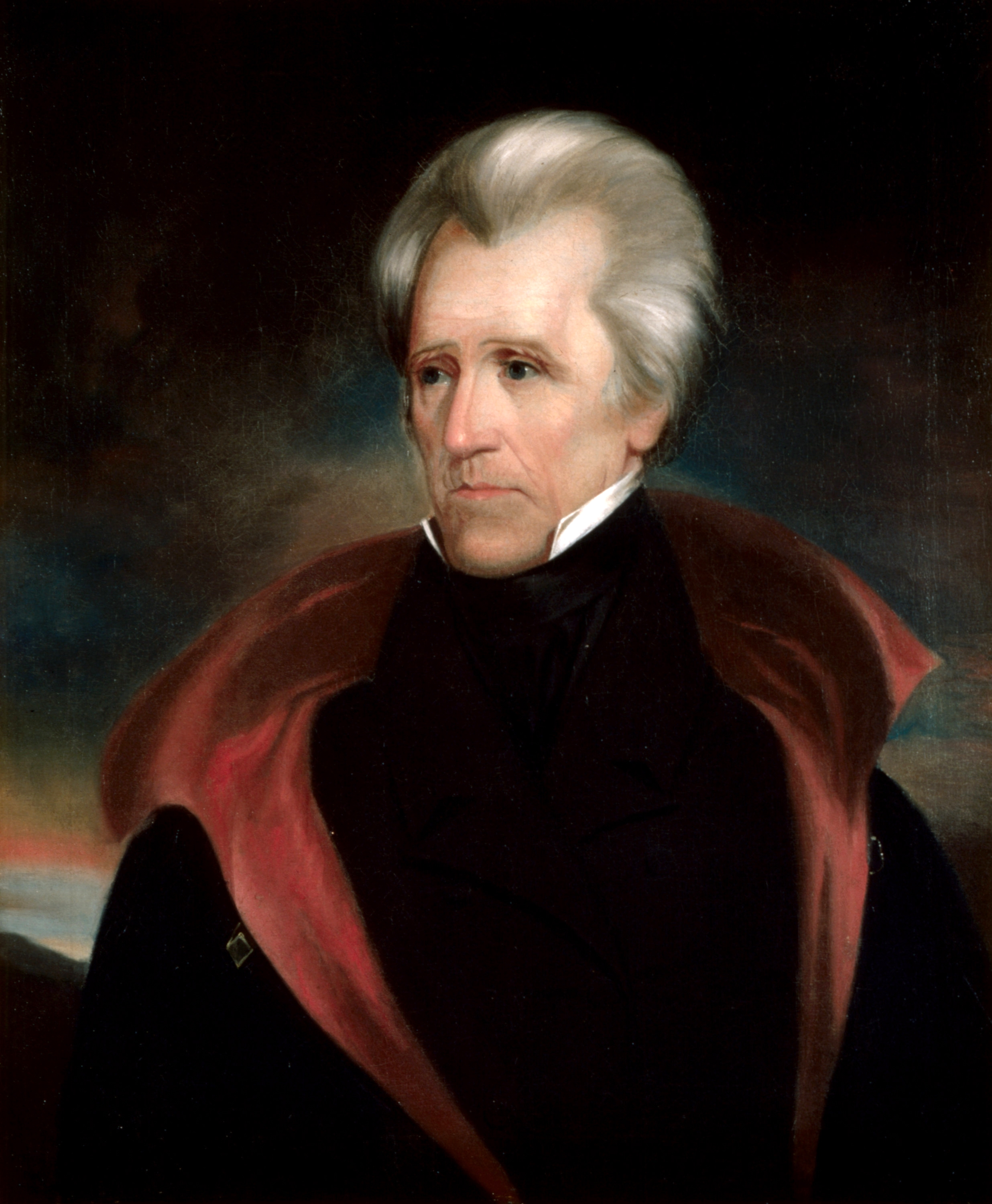
Andrew Jackson, elected President of the United States in 1828, was the dominant national political figure during the brief life of the Philadelphia Working Men's Party.

The July 1828 delegates meeting of the Mechanics' Union of Trade Associations not only passed political by-laws, but also called three district meetings for its adherents — one in the Northern Liberties section, one in Philadelphia city center, and another in the Southwark section. These three meetings, held in August, began the Working Men's Party as an independent entity. The new party joined the political field as a third party against the two dominant political parties of the day, the Democratic Party headed by Andrew Jackson and an anti-Jackson coalition organized locally as the Federalist Party. (Note: Nationally the Federalist Party had been dead for several years, but continued to exist in Philadelphia throughout the 1820s.)

The meetings held at Northern Liberties and Southwark were raucous, infiltrated by established politicians with the Southwark session nearly suppressed by a district judge acting at the behest of the anti-Jackson conservative forces who controlled the city government, who is reported to have "no right under heaven or the laws to call such a meeting." In Northern Liberties an attempt to railroad through a set of resolutions ended to tumult and cries to "throw the chairman out of the window" before good faith could be asserted and order temporarily restored. A rump session had been held after conclusion of the main meeting at which Jackson loyalists had passed a resolution condemning political action by the organized labor movement and pledging allegiance to the Jacksonian Democratic Party.

The City Center meeting was the most successful of the preliminary gatherings, managing to conduct its organizational tasks without the disruptive activities of pro-Administration or pro-Jackson loyalists. It issued a call for the convocation of four district meetings, each to elect 5 delegates to a city nominating convention on August 25. These meetings were held on schedule, but the Working Men's Party's nominees were kept under wraps until their announcement in October, just prior to the November election.

=== Election of 1828 ===
Nominations of the fledgling Working Men's Party for the 1828 election were carried out at a county nominating convention held on September 2. In addition to nomination of a slate of candidates, this meeting also named several "Committees of Vigilance" to campaign for the party ticket in the various wards of the city. Party headquarters were also established.

Unlike the situation which would develop in New York City with the independent Working Men's Party that would emerge there in 1829, the Philadelphia Working Men's Party did not put forward a slate of candidates who were largely workers and craftsmen from the bench. This state of affairs emerged due to the fact that there still remained substantial property ownership qualifications for those seeking public office — a hurdle which few wage workers could clear. Instead, the largely working class attendees of the Working Men's Party's organizational meetings nominated propertied candidates who vowed to "support the interests and claims of the Working Classes."

A number of candidates were nominated jointly with either the anti-Jackson Federal Party or the Jackson Democrats, while 8 candidates stood for election exclusively on the line of the Working Men's Party. These exclusive Working Men's Party candidates all fell to defeat, while 21 of the party's joint candidates with the Jackson Democrats were elected. While defeat of the Working Men's Party candidates running in three-way races was no surprise, the modest vote totals garnered fell short of expectations — ranging from 229 to 539 votes per candidate inside the city, while a tally topping the 1,000 mark was sought. Nevertheless, party adherents drew solace from the influence they cast in the race, in which the campaign carriages of both the established parties made use of the slogan "The Working Man's Ticket" on their advertising.

=== Election of 1829 ===
The year 1829 was one of organization, in which the Working Men's Party spread from Philadelphia to other towns in Pennsylvania, including Lancaster, Phillipsburg, Carlisle and Pike Township of Clearfield County. The organization in Philadelphia proper also further developed, reestablishing itself in March for the 1829 election as the Republican Political Association of the Working Men of the City of Philadelphia.

Once again force was employed by the opponents of the Working Men's Party, this time when a meeting of party supporters from the western wards of Philadelphia was disbursed by a mob of about 150 city employees. This meeting was subsequently moved to another location and a resolution adopted condemning the effort at disruption as "a pitiful abuse of power, and a gross violation of republican principles."

A total of 54 candidates were nominated for the 1829 ballot, all of which also received the dual support of either the Jackson Democrats or the coalition of anti-Jackson forces. Twenty of these were elected.

=== Election of 1830 ===
Local political clubs were formed throughout Philadelphia following the election of 1829 and in January 1830 these entities joined and adopted a constitution as the Workingmen's Republican Political Association. This constitution emphasized the educational nature of the organization, dedicating itself to the publication and dissemination of pamphlets explaining the electoral process to workingmen and attempting to generate names and addresses of those not participating in elections and working to remove any financial impediments to their participation which may exist.

Prior to the fall election of 1830, the question arose among the Working Men's Party over whether the nomination of "tried friends" of the working class would continue or whether a limitation on nominations should be made so that only those "engaged in productive pursuits" would henceforth be able to run under the party's banner. The matter does not appear to have been definitively resolved, although a trend towards workingmen only is notable in the surviving evidence.

The Working Men's Party began to bear the brunt of a conservative ideological attack in 1830, with charges of the group being "anti-religious" being levied against the movement. The Jackson Democrats carried the day in the election, although in the Northern Liberties suburb of Philadelphia 8 members of the Working Men's Party were elected as city commissioners.

This marked the last effective election of the organization.

=== Election of 1831 and demise ===
The Working Men's Party conducted city and county nominating conventions in 1831, but momentum had been lost and none of the party's candidates were elected to office. This would be the last election in which the party would field candidates.

The demise of the Working Men's Party has been attributed by historian Philip S. Foner to a failure to unite the various local workingmen's political organizations into a single united statewide organization. The co-optation of the party's program and its tendency to be subsumed as the smaller partner in various efforts at political fusion with other political parties also played no small role in the organization's short life and rapid demise.

== See also ==
- Working Men's Party (New York)
- American Left
- History of the socialist movement in the United States
