= Safety valve theory =

American theory of economic development

The safety valve theory was an American theory of economic development that held the availability of free land and continued expansion westwards into the American frontier contributed to American development, explained the lack of labor movements in the United States, and promoted democracy, economic equality and individualism. The premise was that individuals who were frustrated with poor labor conditions and lack of freedoms in urban areas in the East could escape to the frontier, which in turn created a restraint on political repression and labor abuse in the East.

As a theory on how to deal with unemployment, the safety-valve theory led to the Homestead Act of 1862 in the United States. Given the concentration of immigrants (and population) on the Eastern coast, it was hypothesized that making free land available in the West would relieve the pressure for employment in the East. By analogy with steam pressure (= the need for work), the enactment of a free land law, it was believed, would act as a safety valve. This theory meant that if the East started filling up with immigrants, they could always go West until they reached a point where they could not move any further.

Frederick Jackson Turner has been credited with establishing the safety valve theory. Some scholars have argued that Benjamin Franklin's writings were consistent with safety valve theory, as Franklin argued that the vastness of the United States means that workers will not accept cheap wages from employers because they have the option to settle land of their own.

A distinction has to be made between (1) the safety valve theory as an ideal and (2) the safety valve theory as embodied in the Homestead Act of 1862. There is a dispute whether and to what extent the Homestead Act did or did not succeed as a safety valve in ameliorating the problem of unemployment in the East. Opposition to giving away free land came from employers, who anticipated either a shortage of employees or conditions favorable to employees.

== See also ==
- Labor history of the United States
- American frontier
