= Working Men's Party (New York) =

- Chairman: Thomas Skidmore
- Secretary: Robert Dale Owen
- Founded: 1829; 197 years ago
- Dissolved: 1831; 195 years ago
- Succeeded by: Locofoco faction of the Democratic Party
- Headquarters: New York City
- Newspaper: Working Man's Advocate
- Ideology: Communalism; Labor rights Utopian socialism
- Political position: Left-wing

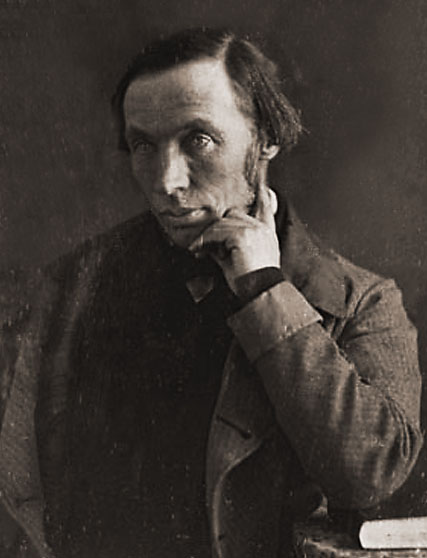
Robert Dale Owen (1801–1877) was a prominent leader of the short-lived New York Working Men's Party.

For other organizations with a similar name, see Workingmen's Party (disambiguation).

The Working Men's Party in New York was a political party founded in April 1829 in New York City. After a promising debut in the fall election of 1829, in which one of the party's candidates was elected to the New York State Assembly, the party rapidly disintegrated into factionalism and discord, vanishing from the scene in 1831.

The New York Working Men's Party was one of a number of short-lived independent workingmen's parties which simultaneously emerged in Philadelphia, Boston, and many other urban centers of the United States during the period 1828 to 1832.

== History ==
=== Background ===
In the late 1820s, corruption was rampant in the municipal administration of New York City. Public services like street lighting were rendered by friends of the politicians who got monopolies for almost no payment to the city. "Charter dealers", among them Samuel B. Romaine, bribed assemblymen in Albany to get a large number of banks chartered. These banks issued their own currency with which working men were paid but which was not well accepted by the commerce, and devaluated quickly. Contractors built houses, but did not pay the workers after delivering the house, without consequences.

A reform movement had also emerged, with the organized agitation of the trade unions of New York City, leading to the adoption on a citywide basis of the 10-hour working day, replacing the former 11-hour standard.

In an effort to avert a return to the longer working day, a mass meeting of "mechanics and others" was held on April 23, 1829. The mass meeting passed a resolution promising not to work past the current "just and reasonable" 10 hour standard and indicating that the names of violators of this restriction would have their names published in the press as enemies of labor. A strike fund was also collected.

An organizational meeting followed on April 28, at which a so-called Committee of Fifty elected to coordinate what was believed to be a forthcoming strike action.

=== Convention ===
This strike was not to be, however, as the city's employers abruptly ended their plan to impose an extension of the working day. This capitulation did not end the Committee of Fifty, however, with the erstwhile strike committee instead submitting a report late in the summer of 1829 calling for establishment of a political party of the workers to contest the forthcoming fall elections.

This report was accepted by another mass meeting and the New York Working Men's Party was born, following the precedent established the previous year by the organized labor movement of Philadelphia.

Chief among Committee of Fifty was a 39-year old machinist named Thomas E. Skidmore (1790–1832), who authored most of the group's resolutions for the electoral campaign. Skidmore also presided over a convention held at Military Hall in New York City on October 19, 1829, at which a set of resolutions, largely authored by Skidmore, was passed.

The party program of 1829 called for the grant of 160 acres of land to every man and to every unmarried woman over age 21, to be held perpetually until the owner's death. All land holdings in excess of 160 acres were to be confiscated by the government for redistribution, according to the Skidmore-authored party resolution. The party also adopted resolutions against the hereditary transmission of wealth and against exclusive privileges and monopolies. Bankers were denounced as "the greatest knaves, impostors and paupers of the age." The program also called for a program of communal education of children, a plank favored by one of the secretaries of the Working Men's Party, Robert Dale Owen (1801–1877), son of the utopian communalist pioneer Robert Owen.

The new party named a slate of candidates for the November elections, including representatives of a variety of trades for seats in the New York State Assembly. The new party engaged in political fusion with organizes seeking to defeat Tammany Hall in races for the New York State Senate.

At the end of October 1829 a weekly newspaper was launched in support of the new labor political movement, the Working Man's Advocate, published by the English-born George Henry Evans (1805–1856), a self-described "mechanic."

=== Election of 1829 ===
The Working Men's Party put forward a full slate of candidates for the New York State Assembly in the November election of 1829. These included a number of working men from the bench, including two machinists, two carpenters, a cooper, a printer, a painter, and a silversmith, among others.

On a very short timetable between its formation, nomination of candidates, and the fall election, the candidates of the Working Men's Party performed acceptably well in a three-way race with the Democratic Party dominated by Tammany Hall and the National Republicans. Final results showed the Tammany Democrats winning 8 of 11 contested legislative seats, the National Republicans winning 2, and one candidate of the Working Men's Party emerging victorious — Ebenezer Ford, President of the Journeymen Carpenters Society.

In the simultaneous elections for citywide office, the Working Men's Party received about 6,000 votes to Tammany Hall's 11,000, helping to stymie Tammany from gaining an outright majority in the Common Council.

=== Reaction ===
The emergence of the fledgling organized workers' movement in the electoral process represented a threat to the leaders of the established political parties, who attempted to appropriate for themselves some of the reform measures garnering broad popular support.

In January 1830, a bill for the better security of mechanics and other laborers of New York City was introduced in the State Assembly by Silas M. Stilwell. The Tammany men immediately took it up as if it were their own, voted for it, and secured the credit of its adoption, when it became a law. Among other things, it required, under penalties, the owner of a building to retain from the contractor the amount to be paid to the workers.

=== Factionalism ===
Although Thomas Skidmore had managed to push some of his favored ideas calling for a redistribution of property into the 1829 platform of the Working Men's Party, his ideas were regarded by primary rival Robert Dale Owen as "crude and impractical" and his personal political style reckoned as "somewhat overbearing and dictatorial." Only a minority supported Skidmore's radical ideas about expropriating and evenly dividing property, a minority favored the education-based humanitarian appeal of Owen, Wright, and Evans.

As the year 1829 drew to a close, a meeting of "mechanics and other workingmen" was held in New York City on December 29 to set the future policy of the party. The meeting was chaired by prominent local politician and Skidmore foe Henry G. Guyon, who refused to allow Skidmore to speak. When Skidmore attempted to address the meeting without official sanction, he was howled down. Skidmore's agrarianism-oriented program was defeated and the communal education policies given primacy in the revised Working Men's Party program, with class differentiation and the denial of political liberty to working people directly connected to the current pedagogical model.

Denied access to the floor at the December 29, 1829, meeting and thereby effectively "read out" of the party, Thomas Skidmore and his co-thinkers called a preparatory meeting soon thereafter, with a formal organizational meeting for a new political organization following on February 23, 1830. About 40 party adherents were in attendance to hear a long argument between Skidmore and Working Man's Advocate publisher Evans in which Skidmore charged that the official party had come to be dominated by the wealthy, while Evans accused Skidmore of having made himself "obnoxious to the great body of workingmen."

A May 19, 1830, meeting of the 70-member General Executive Committee of the Working Men's Party dealt a blow both to the Skidmore and Owen-Evans factions, however, granting to party members "the free enjoyment of their own private opinions on all subjects" while simultaneously asserting "never to support any attempt to palm upon any man, or set of men, the peculiar doctrines of infidelity, agrarianism or sectarian principles," dismissing both the equal distribution of property and communal boarding and clothing of children in favor of maintenance of the traditional family unit. This was followed by another meeting one week later, at which the majority belong to the Owen-Evans group. Those dissenting from the communal boarding school educational model were expelled. The Working Men's Party was thereby formally split.

Evans editorialized upon the situation in the pages of his Working Man's Advocate, attributing the split to a "deliberate plot that has been lately unmasked" to subvert the Working Men's Party to the cause of electing National Republican orator Henry Clay as President of the United States.

=== Elections of 1830 and demise ===
The majority of the Working Men's Party identified as members of the "Clay Workingmen," whether through personal admiration for their banner-bearer, belief in a protective tariff as a fundamental matter of policy, or sheer opportunism in seeking to use the political movement for personal ends. The Owen-Evans Working Men's Party, a minority at the time of the May 1830 split, attempted to persevere with the party's communal education-oriented program and nominated a full ticket for the local election, including an effort to return Ebenezer Ford to the legislative assembly.

The field was joined by Thomas Skidmore's Agrarian Party, which also called itself the "Original Working Men's Party," which nominated a full ticket for state and city office as well, including running Skidmore for United States Congress and his right-hand man, Alexander Ming, Sr., tapped for State Assembly. The party nominated an individual from Orange County for governor, but he declined and no replacement was chosen.

The result of the 1830 election was a crushing blow for the Owens-Evans Working Men's Party and the Skidmore Agrarian Party alike, with the Working Men's candidate for Governor, Ezekiel Williams, winning just 2,332 votes against the nearly 250,000 votes split by the Democratic and National Republican candidates. Tammany Democrats routed the National Republican proxy "Clay Workingmen" in legislative races, with Ebenezer Ford garnering only 2,329 votes in his losing bid for re-election, barely more than a third of his 1829 total.

With the majority of its adherents absorbed into mainstream politics and no radicals elected, the Working Men's Party movement quickly expired. There is anecdotal evidence that it continued to exist into the early part of 1831, but all traces of its existence are absent from the historical record by the time of the 1831 New York City elections. The party was the progenitor, to some extent, of the Locofocos.

== See also ==
- Working Men's Party (Philadelphia)
