= Robert Dale Owen =

Scottish-Welsh American social reformer (1801–1877)

Robert D. Owen
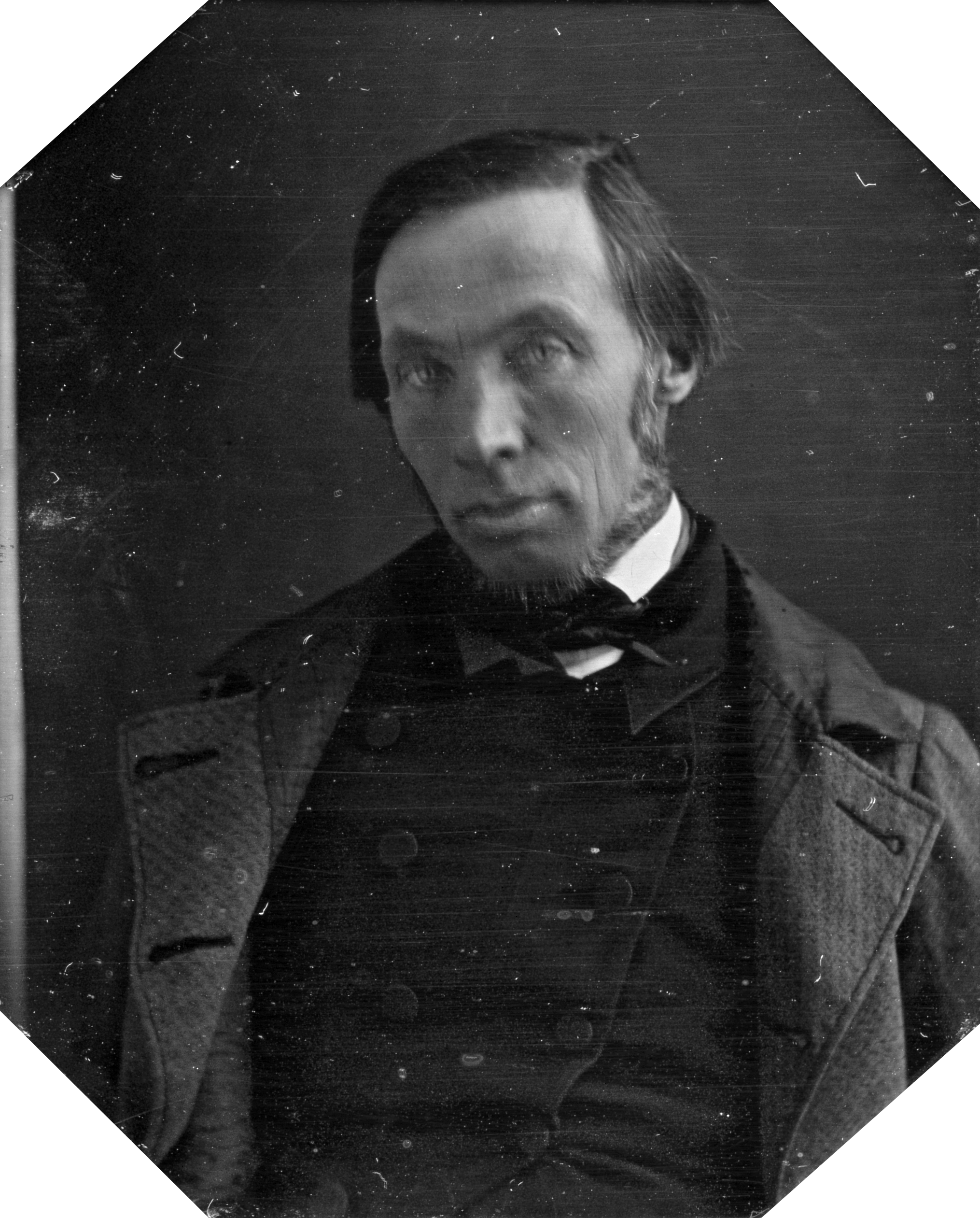
- Owen c. 1847

United States Minister to the Kingdom of the Two Sicilies
- In office August 25, 1853 – June 15, 1858
- President: Franklin Pierce
- Preceded by: Edward Joy Morris
- Succeeded by: Joseph Ripley Chandler

Member of the U.S. House of Representatives from Indiana's 1st district
- In office March 4, 1843 – March 3, 1847
- Preceded by: George H. Proffit
- Succeeded by: Elisha Embree

Member of the Indiana House of Representatives from the 76th district
- In office 1851–1853
- In office 1835–1838

Personal details
- Born: 7 November 1801 Glasgow, Scotland, U.K.
- Died: 24 June 1877 (aged 75) Lake George, New York, U.S.
- Party: Working Men's (1829–1831); Democratic (1832–1877)
- Spouses: Mary Jane Robinson (m. 1832; died 1871) Lottie Walton Kellogg (m. 1876)
- Children: Florence; Julian Dale; Ernest; Rosamond
- Parents: Robert Owen (father); Ann (or Anne) Caroline Dale (mother)
- Relatives: David Dale Owen (brother); Richard Owen (brother)

Robert Dale Owen (7 November 1801 – 24 June 1877) was a Scottish-born Welsh-American social reformer who was active in Indiana politics as member of the Democratic Party in the Indiana House of Representatives (1835–1839 and 1851–1853) and represented Indiana in the U.S. House of Representatives (1843–1847). As a member of Congress, Owen successfully pushed through the bill that established the Smithsonian Institution and served on the Institution's first Board of Regents. Owen also served as a delegate to the Indiana Constitutional Convention in 1850 and was appointed as U.S. chargé d'affaires to Naples (1853–1858).

Owen was a knowledgeable exponent of the socialist doctrines of his father, Robert Owen, and managed the day-to-day operation of New Harmony, Indiana, the socialistic utopian community he helped establish with his father in 1825. Throughout his adult life, Robert Dale Owen wrote and published numerous pamphlets, speeches, books, and articles that described his personal and political views, including his belief in spiritualism. Owen co-edited the New-Harmony Gazette with Frances Wright in the late 1820s in Indiana and the Free Enquirer in the 1830s in New York City. Owen was an advocate of married women's property and divorce rights, and secured inclusion of an article in the Indiana Constitution of 1851 that provided tax-supported funding for a uniform system of free public schools and established the Indiana Superintendent of Public Instruction. Owen also wrote a series of open letters in 1862 that favored the abolition of slavery and supported general emancipation, as well as suggesting that the federal government should provide assistance to freedmen.

== Early life and education ==
Robert Dale Owen was born on 7 November 1801, in Glasgow, Scotland, to Ann (or Anne) Caroline Dale and Robert Owen. His mother was the daughter of David Dale, a Scottish textile manufacturer; his Welsh-born father became part-owner and manager of the New Lanark Mills, his father-in-law's textile mill at New Lanark, Scotland. Robert Dale was the eldest surviving son of eight children; his younger siblings (three brothers and three sister) were William, Ann (or Anne) Caroline, Jane Dale, David Dale, Richard Dale, and Mary.

Owen grew up in Braxfield, Scotland, and was privately tutored before he was sent at the age of sixteen to Philipp Emanuel von Fellenberg's school at Hofwyl, Switzerland. The Swiss school exposed Owen to Johann Heinrich Pestalozzi's method of education. After completing his formal education, Owen returned to Scotland to join his father in the textile business at New Lanark.

Owen's father, a successful textile manufacturer and philanthropist, became a noted socialist reformer whose vision of social equality included, among other projects, the establishment of experimental utopian communities in the United States and the United Kingdom. Robert Dale Owen, who shared many of his father's views on social issues immigrated to the United States in 1825, in his early 20s. He became a U.S. citizen and helped his father manage the socialistic community at New Harmony, Indiana. Owen's three surviving brothers (William, David, and Richard) and his sister, Jane, also immigrated to the United States and became residents of New Harmony.

== Early career ==
Between 1825 and 1828, Owen managed the day-to-day operations of the socialistic community at New Harmony, Indiana, while his father returned to Britain to resume his social reform and philanthropic work in Europe. In addition to his other work, Owen and Frances Wright, a wealthy, Scottish philanthropist and radical reformer, published articles in the New-Harmony Gazette, the town's liberal weekly newspaper, and served as its co-editors. Established in 1825, the Gazette was one of Indiana's earliest newspapers; however, it ceased publications in February 1829.

After the New Harmony utopian community dissolved in 1827, Owen traveled in Europe before returning to the United States in 1829. During this period Owen wrote Moral Physiology; or, A Brief and Plain Treatise on the Population Question (1830), a controversial pamphlet on the topic of population control. It was one of the first books in the United States to advocate birth control, along with Dr. Charles Knowlton's Fruits of Philosophy. Knowlton and Owen were contemporaries and apparently knew each other. Content from Knowlton's book appears in Owen's, and the second edition of Knowlton's book includes some of Owen's content.

Owen moved to New York City, where he and Wright co-edited the weekly Free Enquirer until 1831–32. As they had done in the New Harmony Gazette, the Free Enquirer continued to express their radical views on a variety of subjects, including abolition of slavery, women's rights, universal suffrage, free public education, birth control, and religion. Owen returned to New Harmony, Indiana, in 1833, after he and Wright discontinued their editorship of the New York newspaper.

== Marriage and family ==
Owen and Mary Jane Robinson were married before a justice of the peace on 12 April 1832, in New York City. After an extended trip to Europe, they relocated to New Harmony, Indiana. The couple had six children, two of whom died at an early age. Their surviving children were Florence (b. 1836), Julian Dale (b. 1837), Ernest (b. 1838), and Rosamond (b. 1843).

On June 23, 1876, five years after the death of his first wife, Owen married Lottie Walton Kellogg at Caldwell, New York; he died a year later.

== Politician and statesman ==
=== Working Men's Party leader ===
During 1829–30, Owen became an active leader in the Working Men's Party in New York City. In contrast to Democratic Presidents Andrew Jackson and James K. Polk, Owen was opposed to slavery, although his partisanship distanced him from other leading abolitionists of the era.

=== Indiana legislator ===
After Owen's return to New Harmony, Indiana in 1833, he became active in state politics. Owen served in the Indiana House of Representatives (1835–38; 1851–53). He distinguished himself as an influential member of the Indiana General Assembly during his first term by securing appropriations for the state's tax-supported public school system. In addition, Owen was instrumental in introducing legislation and argued in support of widows and married women's property rights, but the bill was defeated. He also proposed laws granting women greater freedom of divorce.

In addition to serving in the state legislature, Owen was elected as a delegate from Posey County, Indiana, to the Indiana Constitutional Convention in 1850. At the convention, Owen initiated a proposal to include provisions for women's property rights in the state constitution. Although it was not approved, this early effort to protect women's rights led to later laws that were passed to secure women's property, divorce, and voting rights. One of Owen's lasting legacies was his authorship and efforts to secure the inclusion of an article in the Indiana Constitution of 1851 that provided state funding for a uniform system of common schools that are free and open to all and established the office of the state's superintendent of public instruction.

=== U.S. Congressman ===
After his first term in the Indiana legislature and two unsuccessful campaigns for election to the U.S. Congress in 1838 and in 1840, Owen was elected as a Democrat to the U.S. House of Representatives in 1842. He served from 1843 to 1847 in the Twenty-eighth and Twenty-ninth Congresses. Owen was chairman of the Committee on Roads and Canals during the Twenty-eighth Congress. He was also involved in the debates about the annexation of Texas and an Oregon boundary dispute in 1844 that led to the establishment of the U.S-British boundary at the 49th parallel north, the result of the Oregon Treaty (1846).

While serving as a member of Congress, Owen introduced and helped to secure passage of the bill that founded the Smithsonian Institution in 1846. Owen was appointed to the Smithsonian Institution's first Board of Regents and chaired its Building Committee, which oversaw the construction of the Smithsonian Institution Building in Washington, D.C., and recommended James Renwick Jr. as architect, James Dixson and Gilbert Cameron as the contractors, and the Seneca Quarry for its distinct, dark-red sandstone.

Owen, his brother David Dale Owen, and architect Robert Mills, were involved in developing preliminary plans for the Smithsonian Building. These early plans influenced Renwick's choice of the Romanesque Revival architectural style (sometimes referred to as Norman-style architecture) and his three-story design for the building, which was finally selected, although not without controversy. Owen's book Hints on Public Architecture (1849) argued the case for the suitability of Renwick's Romanesque Revival (Norman) architectural style for public buildings such as the Smithsonian "Castle," which he discussed in detail. Seven full-page illustrations and details of the building's architectural elements were prominently featured in the book, leading some to criticize Owen for his bias toward Renwick and his preference for Norman-style architecture over other popular styles.

=== U.S. diplomat ===
Owen was defeated in his bid for re-election to Congress in 1846; however, he remained active in public service and was once again elected to serve in the Indiana General Assembly. On 24 May 1853, while Owen was serving as a state legislator in Indiana, President Franklin Pierce appointed him as U.S. minister (Chargé d'Affaires and Minister Resident) to the Kingdom of the Two Sicilies at Naples. Owen served in the diplomatic post until 20 September 1858, and then retired from political life, although he remained actively interested in public affairs and social reform issues.

=== Other political activities ===
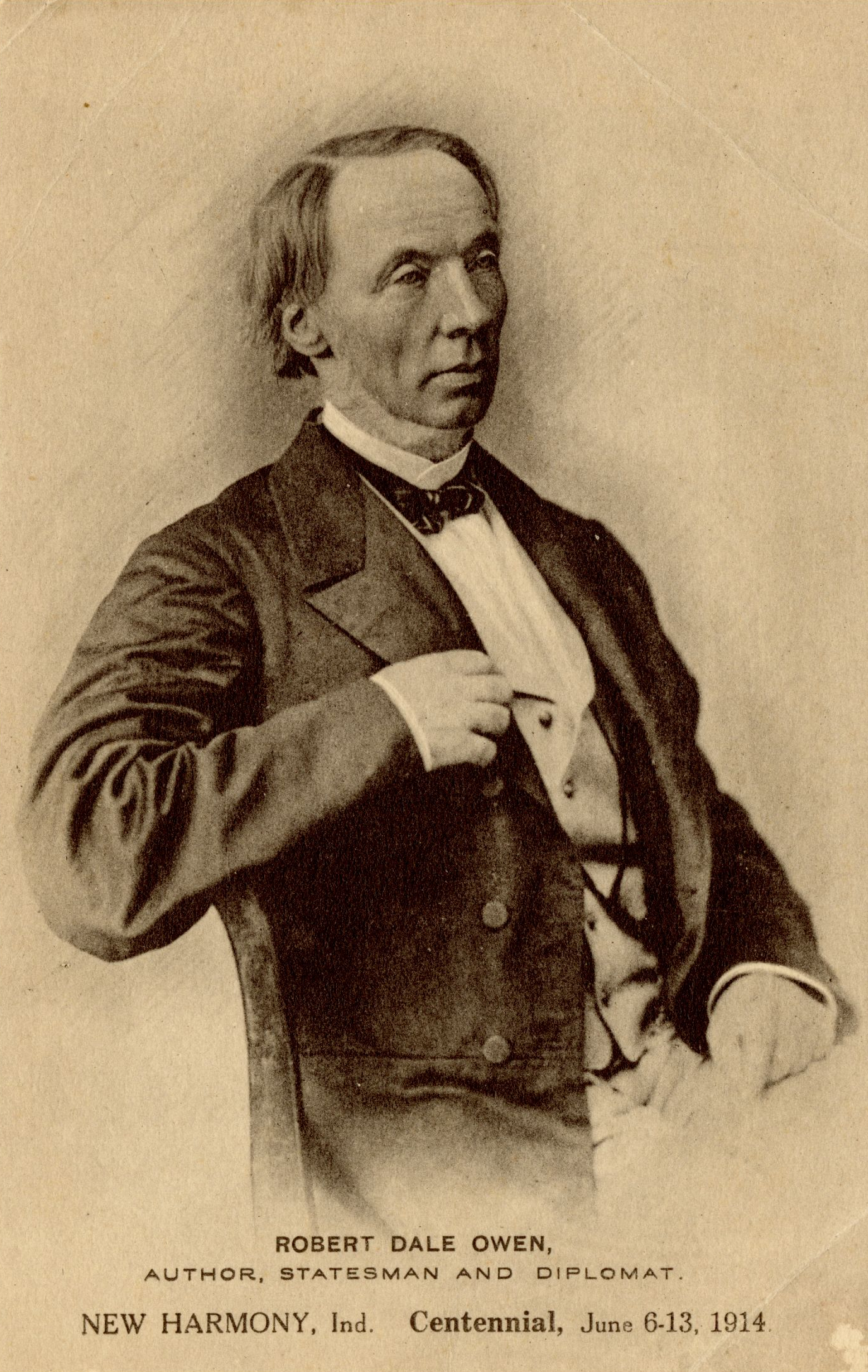
Owen later in life

During the American Civil War, Owen served in the Ordnance Commission to supply the Union Army; on 16 March 1863, he was appointed to the Freedman's Inquiry Commission. The commission was a predecessor to the Freedmen's Bureau.

In 1862 Owen wrote a series of open letters to U.S. government officials, including President Abraham Lincoln and U.S. Secretary of the Treasury Salmon P. Chase, to encourage them to support general emancipation. Owen's letter of 23 July 1862, was published in the New York Evening Post on 8 August 1862, and his letter of 12 September 1862, was published in the same newspaper on 22 September 1862. In another open letter that Owen wrote to President Lincoln on 17 September 1862, he urged the president to abolish slavery on moral grounds. Owen also believed that emancipation would weaken the Confederate forces and help the Union army win the war. On 23 September 1862, Lincoln issued a preliminary version of the Emancipation Proclamation (as he had first resolved to do in mid-July). In Emancipation is Peace, a pamphlet that Owen wrote in 1863, he confirmed his view that general emancipation was a means to end the war. In The Wrong of Slavery, the Right of Emancipation, and the Future of the African Race in the United States, a report that Owen wrote in 1864, he also suggested that the Union should provide assistance to freedmen.

Toward the end of his political career, Owen continued his effort to obtain federal voting rights for women. In 1865 he submitted an initial draft for a proposed Fourteenth Amendment to the U.S. Constitution that would not restrict voting rights to males. However, Article XIV, Section 2, in the final version of the Amendment, which became part of the U.S. Constitution in 1868, was modified to limit suffrage to males who were U.S. citizens over the age of twenty-one.

== Spiritualism ==
In The authenticity of the Bible (1833), Owen remarked :

For a century and a half, then, after Jesus' death, we have no means whatever of substantiating even the existence of the Gospels, as now bound up in the New Testament. There is a perfect blank of 140 years; and a most serious one it is.

Like his father, Owen converted to Spiritualism and was the author of two books on the subject: Footfalls on the Boundary of Another World (1860) and The Debatable Land Between this World and the Next (1872).

== Later years ==
Although he retired from active public service at the conclusion of his work as a member of the Freedman's commission on 15 May 1864, Owen continued his writing career. Major writing projects in retirement included Beyond the Breakers (1870), a novel; The Debatable Land Between this World and the Next (1871), one of his two books on spiritualism; and Threading My Way (1874), his autobiography. Owen also wrote several articles that were published in the Atlantic Monthly and Scribner's Monthly.

In 1875 Owen suffered a mental breakdown that was severe enough for him to be hospitalized at the Indiana Hospital for the Insane in Indianapolis, where he underwent three months of treatment. Owen recovered from the illness, was released from the hospital, and resumed writing. On 23 June 1876, a year before his death, Owen married Lottie Walton Kellogg at Caldwell, New York.

== Death and legacy ==
On 24 June 1877, Owen died at his summer home at Crosbyville on Lake George, New York. Initially he was buried in the town of Lake George in Warren County, New York. Later, his remains were exhumed and interred at New Harmony, Indiana, beside his first wife, Mary Jane Owen.

One of Owen's most significant legacies in Indiana was to secure the inclusion of an article in the Indiana Constitution of 1851 that provided tax-supported funding for a uniform system of free public schools and established the position of Indiana Superintendent of Public Instruction. His early efforts to protect women's rights were another of his political legacies. Although he was unsuccessful in adding provisions to protect women's rights to Indiana's state constitution of 1851, his efforts paved the way for others to follow. Eventually, Indiana laws granted women's property and voting rights, as well as greater freedom in divorce.

As a U.S. Congressman, Owen introduced federal legislation that founded the Smithsonian Institution in 1846. He was also a member of the Smithsonian Institution's first Board of Regents and its Building Committee. His vision for the Smithsonian Institution Building, along with the preliminary plans and suggestions made by his brother, David Dale Owen, and architect Robert Mills, influenced architect James Renwick Jr.'s design for the Romanesque Revival-style building in Washington, D.C.

Owen's impact on the issues of slavery and emancipation is less direct. In a series of open letters he wrote in 1862 and in publications that followed, Owen encouraged the abolition of slavery on moral grounds, supported general emancipation, and suggested that the federal government should provide assistance to freedmen. Some historians have concluded that these open letters and Civil War-era pamphlets "helped immeasurably to solidify public opinion" in favor of emancipation.

== Honors and tributes ==
The town of Dale, Indiana, was named in Owen's honor.

In 1911, the women of Indiana dedicated a memorial to Owen on the grounds of the Indiana Statehouse in Indianapolis that included a bronze bust of the statesman created by New Castle, Indiana native Frances Goodwin. The bust of Owen disappeared in the early 1970s; only its pedestal remains.

== Selected published works ==
Owen's published works included pamphlets, speeches, tracts, books, and numerous articles for periodicals and newspapers.

- An Outline of the System of Education at New Lanark (1824)
- Popular Tracts (1830)
- Moral Physiology; or, A Brief and Plain Treatise on the Population Question (1830)
- Discussion on the Existence of God, and The Authenticity of the Bible (1833), co-written with Origen Bacheler
- Labor: Its History and its Prospects (1848), an address delivered at Cincinnati, Ohio, in 1841; republished in 1851.
- Hints on Public Architecture (1849)
- Footfalls on the Boundary of Another World (1859)
- The Policy of Emancipation: In Three Letters (1863)
- Emancipation is Peace (1863)
- The Wrong of Slavery, the Right of Emancipation, and the Future of the African Race (1864)
- Beyond the Breakers. A Story of the Present Day. Village Life in the West (1870), a novel that was initially published serially in Lippincott's Magazine in 1869.
- The Debatable Land Between this World and the Next (1871)
- Threading My Way: Twenty-Seven Years of Autobiography (1874)
- "Touching Visitants from a Higher Life," published in The Atlantic Monthly, volume 35, number 207, January 1875, pages 57–69.

== See also ==
- Freedmen's town
- Josiah Warren
- Birth control movement in the United States

== Sources ==
- Bacheler, Origen, and Robert Dale Owen (1833). Discussion on the Existence of God, and The Authenticity of the Bible. A.J. Matsell.
- Brown, Allison, and Kisha Tandy (Summer 2014). "To Be Morally Just: Robert Dale Owen and Abolitionism". Traces of Indiana and Midwestern History. 26 (3). Indianapolis: Indiana Historical Society: 50–55.
- Burford, William (1920). Yearbook of the State of Indiana for the Year 1919. Indiana: Legislative Bureau Division of Accounting and Statistics and The State Board of Accounts.
- Estabrook, Arthur H. (1923). "The Family History of Robert Owen". Indiana Magazine of History. 19 (1). Bloomington: Indiana University: 63–101.
- Gilman, D. C.; Peck, H. T.; Colby, F. M., eds. (1905). "Owen, Robert Dale" . New International Encyclopedia (1st ed.). New York: Dodd, Mead.
- Greiff, Glory-June (2005). Remembrance, Faith and Fancy: Outdoor Public Sculpture in Indiana. Indianapolis: Indiana Historical Society Press. ISBN 0-87195-180-0.
- Gugin, Linda C.; St. Clair, James E. (2015). Indiana's 200: The People Who Shaped the Hoosier State. Indianapolis: Indiana Historical Society Press. ISBN 978-0-87195-387-2.
- "The Indiana Statehouse: A Self-Guided Tour" (PDF). Indiana Department of Administration. Archived from the original (PDF) on 14 June 2011.
- Owen, Robert; Royster, Paul (February 1848). Labor: Its History and Its Prospects. Libraries at University of Nebraska-Lincoln.
- Leopold, Richard William (1940). Robert Dale Owen: A Biography. Cambridge, Massachusetts: Harvard University Press. OCLC 774894.
- Lott, Eric (1993). Love and Theft: Blackface Minstrelsy and the American Working Class. New York: Oxford University Press. ISBN 9780199717682.
- "Making of America". Cornell University Library. Archived from the original on 4 June 2003.
- "Owen, Robert Dale (1801–1877)". Biographical Directory of the United States Congress. U.S. Congress.
- Owen, Robert Dale (1874). Threading My Way, Twenty-seven Years of Autobiography. New York; London: G. W. Carleton and Company; Trubner and Company.
- Pancoast, Elinor, and Anne E. Lincoln (1940). The Incorrigible Idealist: Robert Dale Owen in America. Bloomington, Indiana: Principia Press. ISBN 9780722204887. OCLC 2000563.
- Pitzer, Donald E. (Spring 2014). "Why New Harmony is World Famous". Traces of Indiana and Midwestern History. 26 (2). Indianapolis: Indiana Historical Society: 4–15.
- Peck, Garrett (2013). The Smithsonian Castle and the Seneca Quarry. The History Press.
- Podmore, Frank (1907). Robert Owen: A Biography. Vol. I. New York: D. Appleton and Company.
- "Robert Dale Owen". Department History. U.S. Department of State, Office of the Historian.
- "Robert Dale Owen's Letter to President Lincoln". University of Evansville.

U.S. House of Representatives
Preceded by George H. Proffit	Member of the U.S. House of Representatives from Indiana's 1st congressional district 1843–1847	Succeeded by Elisha Embree
Diplomatic posts
Preceded by Edward Joy Morris	United States Ambassador (as Chargé d'Affaires and Minister Resident) to the Two Sicilies; 1853–1858	Succeeded by Joseph Ripley Chandler
