= Family secret (disambiguation) =

A family secret can be defined as "events or information that members hide from each other or those outside the family".

Family secret or family secrets can also refer to:

== Film ==
- The Family Secret (1924 film), a 1924 silent film
- The Family Secret (1951 film), a 1951 movie starring John Derek and Lee J. Cobb
- Family Secrets (1984 film), a television movie starring Stefanie Powers
- A Family Secret (film), a 2006 Canadian film starring Ginette Reno

== Television ==
- Family Secrets (game show), an NBC daytime game show
- A Family Secret (Upstairs, Downstairs)
- Family Secrets (Canadian TV series), a 2003 documentary series created and produced by Maureen Judge
- Family Secrets (2016 TV series), a Turkish TV series produced by Faruk Turgut
- Family Secrets (2021 TV series), a Turkish TV series produced by Kerem Çatay
- Family Secret (TV series), a South Koreas television series
- Family Secrets (Polish TV series), a 2022 Netflix miniseries
- "Family Secrets" (Doctors), a 2004 television episode
- "The Family Secret", an episode of TV series In the Heat of the Night

== Other uses ==
- Family Secrets (novel), a novel by Norma Klein
- The Ladies' Gallery: A Memoir of Family Secrets
- Operation Family Secrets, an FBI investigation
- "Family Secret", a song by Alannah Myles from her 1995 album A-lan-nah
