= Gabriel Herman =

Israeli historian (1947–2024)

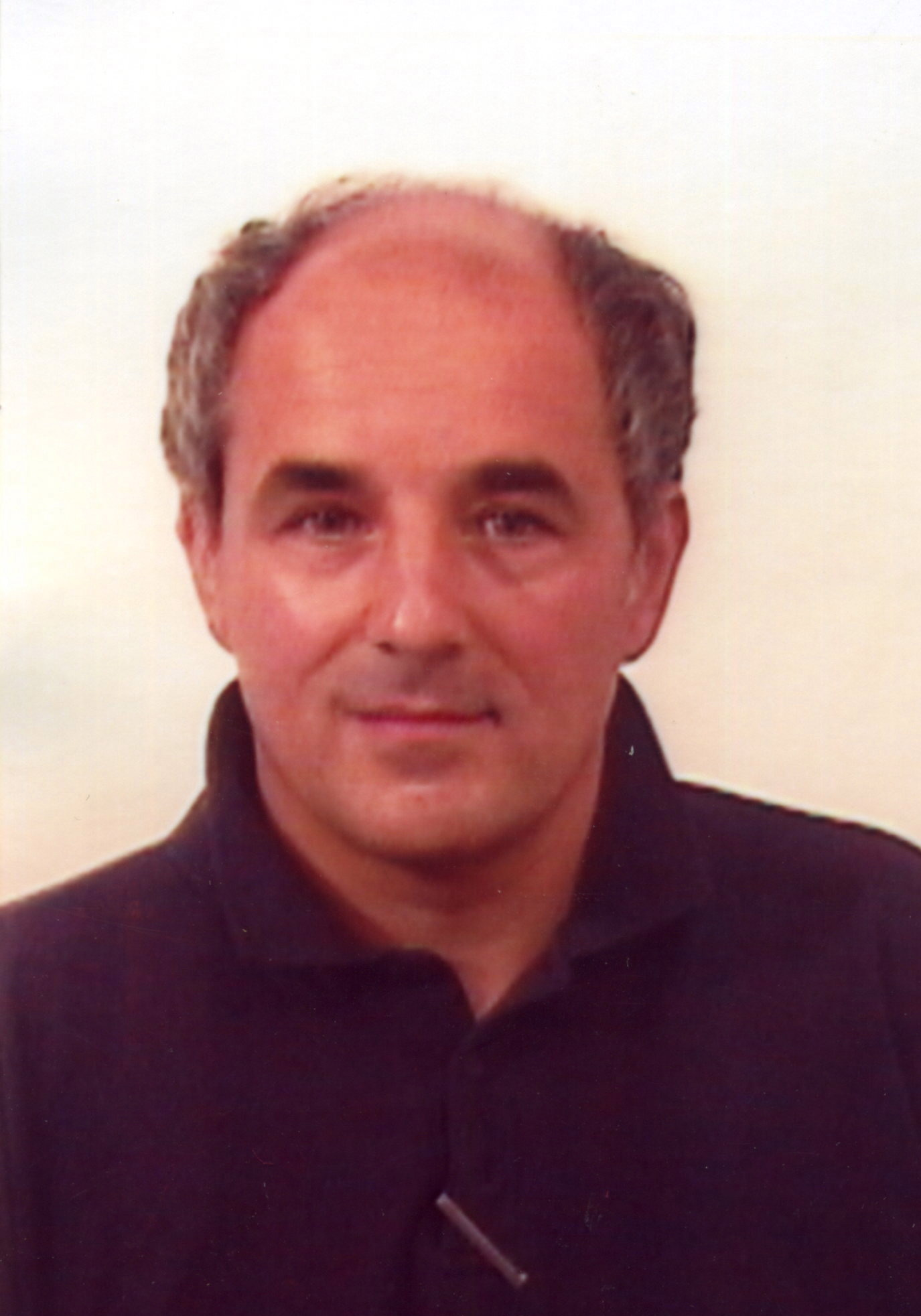
Gabriel Herman

Gabriel Herman (Hebrew: גבריאל הרמן; (1947–2024) was Professor in Ancient History at the Hebrew University of Jerusalem. He specialised in ancient Greek social history, focusing on issues such as social structure, interpersonal relationships, moral norms, rituals, conflict resolution and decision making.

== Biography ==
Gabriel Herman was born in Târgu Mureș (Transylvania), Romania, and raised in Israel. He was educated at the Hebrew University of Jerusalem and the University of Cambridge, he has taught at the Hebrew University since completing his PhD at Cambridge in 1985. He is married with three children.

== Fellowships and awards ==
Herman is fellow-for-life at Darwin College, Cambridge, and has held visiting fellowships at Churchill College, Cambridge; Clare Hall, Cambridge; Fondation Hardt, Genève; the Institute for Advanced Study, Princeton; and the Institute for Research in the Humanities, University of Madison, Wisconsin. He has served as Directeur d'études at the École Pratique des Hautes Études, Section des Sciences Religieuses, Sorbonne. Herman has received numerous Hebrew University Scholarships: an Aylwin Cotton and a Leo Baeck Fellowship Award, an Alon Fellowship Award (Israel Ministry of Education). In 2005, he won the First Polonsky Prize for Creativity and Originality in the Humanistic Disciplines.

== Academic research ==
Herman's research has been motivated by three interrelated questions from the start. First, how do social institutions, values, norms, customs, laws, ideologies, sentiments, and drives, whether recognised or subconscious, affect human behaviour in general, and how did they affect the behaviour of the ancient Greeks and Romans in particular? Second, how do these factors interact in the formation of societies and groups characterised by that unique combination of customs, actions and outlooks that goes under the name of culture? Third, what drives a historical narrative and/or motivates the historical process?

Herman advocates a closer interaction between ancient history and the social, behavioural and life sciences. Historians should, in his view, keep track of the insights achieved in these fields and apply them to the analysis of the past societies that are the objects of their studies. With a view to developing analytical tools capable of tackling problems that could not be satisfactorily resolved using the historian's traditional analytical apparatus alone, Herman has been involved over the past year in initiating the production of a multi-authored synoptic guide to ancient Greece and Rome, guided by a novel conception of environment, economy, society, politics, and culture.

Herman's published works may be divided into three categories:

=== Ritual and social structure ===
The first category includes contributions to the study of friendship, kinship, social structure, politics and international relations in ancient Greece: a three-dimensional view of a bond that, though ubiquitous in the Greek and Roman world, had previously been poorly understood by modern writers. This is the relationship known to the Greeks as xenia and to the Romans as hospitium. Having identified this bond as a sort of quasi-kinship that has also been observed by social scientists in more recent cultures, he followed up its implications for Greek histoire événementielle by examining how xenia/hospitium functioned in three largely dissimilar social settings: the hierarchical, individualistic world of petty rulers reflected in the Homeric poems, the egalitarian (at the elite level, at least), collectivistic world of the classical and Hellenistic city-state, reflected in classical Greek literature, and the huge upper-class power networks of the late (by then Christian) Roman Empire, reflected in the Greek and Latin literature of the late Roman and early medieval periods. In 'Rituals of evasion in ancient Greece' Herman describes a kind of ritual that has survived into the world of the Greek city states from that early stage of human existence during which societal norms had not as yet been internalised, and no sense of guilt had yet been formed.

=== The Athenian democracy ===
The second category of studies is centred on the Athenian democracy. The idea of writing a social history of Athens came with the realisation that there were serious flaws in the then widely practised (and largely unchallenged) way of reading and interpreting the Attic Orators; and that in consequence, the entire moral image assigned to the Athenian democracy by modern writers must be regarded as questionable, if not distorted. Herman proceeded to test his ideas through a wide variety of sources, with regard to politics, land tenure, the employment of slaves, interpersonal and class relations, conflict resolution, state power, the army, foreign relations, religion and the economy.

In his book Morality and Behaviour in Democratic Athens (2006), Herman offers a description of ancient Athens, perhaps for the first time, as an integrated social system, and introduces a radical re-interpretation of the Athenian democracy. He characterises as exceptional the strategy of inter-personal interaction that the Athenian democrats developed to resolve conflict, increase co-operation and achieve collective objectives. . In a recent article Herman offers a solution to the long-standing question of how a direct democracy run by masses could have functioned at all.

=== The mainsprings of the historical process ===
The third category of studies in which Herman has a particular interest concerns the mainsprings of human behaviour.

The argument of the book that he is working on – Causation, Genes and History – is that if we combine history with the insights of modern genetics, introducing into our customary list of historical causes (economic, psychological, etc.) one that precedes most other causes – to wit, human nature – and then the cause of this cause itself – genes or DNA – we obtain a new theory of historical causation. Human genes are a far more objective and easily ascertainable cause than most proximate causes adduced by historians. In a sense, they might be conceived of as the ultimate cause, or the first principle, of the historical process. In 'Greek epiphanies and the sensed presence' Herman argues that the circumstances similar to those described by John Geiger with regard to modern visions dubbed in research as 'the Third Man factor' (a life-threatening trauma and/or a state of severe existential distress) also prevailed in connection with the Greek epiphanies. The third man factor thus offers an important clue for unravelling the mental processes that gave rise to the epiphanies in ancient Greek culture.

== Selected publications ==
- Ritualised Friendship and the Greek City (Cambridge, 1987).
- 'The court society of the Hellenistic Age', in Hellenistic Constructs: Culture, History and Historiography, (eds.) P. Cartledge, P. Garnsey and E. Gruen (Berkeley, 1997), pp. 199–224.
- ‘Le parrainage, “l’hospitalité” et l'expansion du Christianisme', Annales Histoire Sciences Sociales, 52.6 (1997), pp. 1305–1338.
- ‘Reciprocity, altruism and the prisoner’s dilemma: the special case of ancient Athens’, in Reciprocity in Ancient Greece, (eds.) C. Gill, N. Postlethwaite and R. Seaford (Oxford, 1998), pp. 199–226.
- Morality and Behaviour in Democratic Athens, A Social History (Cambridge, 2006).
- Ed., with I. Shatzman, Greeks between East and West (Jerusalem, 2007).
- Review article of Lorel J. Samons II (ed.), The Cambridge Companion to the Age of Pericles (Cambridge, 2007), Scripta Classica Israelica 20 (2010), 81–90.
- ‘The best few and the bad many: decision making in the Athenian democracy’, in H. Lohmann and T. Mattern (eds.), Attika – Archäologie einer 'zentralen' Kulturlandschaft (Wiesbaden 2010), pp. 231–244.
- ‘Greek epiphanies and the sensed presence’, Historia 60 (2011), 127–157.
- Ed., Stability and Crisis in the Athenian Democracy (Stuttgart, 2011).
