= Digital privacy =

Data protection and control

Digital privacy is often used in contexts that promote advocacy on behalf of individual and consumer privacy rights in e-services and is typically used in opposition to the business practices of many e-marketers, businesses, and companies to collect and use such information and data. Digital privacy, a crucial aspect of modern online interactions and services, can be defined under three sub-related categories: information privacy, communication privacy, and individual privacy.

Digital privacy has increasingly become a topic of interest as information and data shared over the social web have continued to become more and more commodified; social media users are now considered unpaid "digital labors", as one pays for "free" e-services through the loss of their privacy. For example, between 2005 and 2011, the change in levels of disclosure for different profile items on Facebook shows that, over the years, people have wanted to keep more information private. Observing the seven-year span, Facebook gained a profit of $100 billion through the collection and sharing of their users' data with third-party advertisers.

The more a user shares on social networks, the more privacy is lost. All of the information and data one shares is connected to clusters of similar information. As the user continues to share their productive expression, it gets matched with the respective cluster, and their speech and expression are no longer only in the possession of them or of their social circle. This can be seen as a consequence of building social capital. As people create new and diverse ties on social networks, data becomes linked. This decrease in privacy continues until bundling appears (when the ties become strong and the network more homogeneous).

As digital privacy concerns grow, regulatory approaches have emerged to protect user data across various sectors. In the United States, privacy regulation has traditionally been sector-based, with different industries having their own rules. Since the 1970s, laws have covered areas like financial services, healthcare, and education. However, recent efforts, such as the American Data Privacy and Protection Act of 2022 (ADPPA), signal a shift toward a comprehensive privacy framework. This mirrors the European Union's General Data Protection Regulation (GDPR), which provides uniform privacy rules across all sectors.

A key challenge in digital privacy regulation is tailoring data protection rules for specific industries, particularly in digital spaces like social media, search engines, and mobile apps, where data collection practices often exceed existing laws. The Federal Trade Commission has played a central role in addressing these concerns, with its growing expertise in the digital landscape. As the digital economy evolves, there is increasing pressure for stronger privacy laws that balance privacy protection with competition. Advocates argue that this balance is necessary to protect users from exploitation by companies with massive data collection capabilities.

== Types of privacy ==
=== Information privacy ===
In the context of digital privacy, information privacy is the idea that individuals should have the freedom to determine how their digital information is collected and used. This is particularly relevant for personally identifiable information.

The concept of information privacy has evolved in parallel to the evolution of the field of Information Technology (IT). The rise of networking and computing led to the dramatic change in the ways of information exchange. The baseline for this concept was put forward in the late 1940s, and the third era of privacy development began in the 1990s.

The European Union has various privacy laws that dictate how information may be collected and used by companies. Some of those laws are written to give agency to the preferences of individuals/consumers in how their data is used. The General Data Protection Regulation (GDPR) is an example of this. In other places, like in the United States, privacy law is argued by some to be less developed in this regard. By example, some legislation, or lack thereof, allow companies to self-regulate their collection and dissemination practices of consumer information.

It is a common practice in some countries to oblige companies and websites to provide users with notice and ask for the consent to collect their data and/or track activity. However, the specifics of this procedure usually are not properly regulated, which allows websites to manipulate users into obtaining consent by reducing the visibility of the notice, the frequency of requests for consent, etc. This affects the power dynamics between companies and consumers, perceived risks, and jeopardizes the right to privacy in the collection of personal data.

One such example of privacy policies being called into question would be on the social media app TikTok. While collecting user data normally requires permission from the user, the app is known to be quite insistent on the user sharing the data, at least in comparison to other apps such as Facebook. Since TikTok is capable of running without the user's personal data being gathered, this has raised suspicions about the app being used for data harvesting by the government.

=== Public perception of risks and regulation ===
A 2023 Pew Research study highlights growing concerns among Americans about data privacy. 81% are worried about how companies use their personal data, and 71% share similar concerns about government data usage. Many feel they lack control over their data, with 73% stating they have little control over how companies collect their information and 79% feeling the same about government data collection.

The report also reveals that a significant portion of Americans are confused about data usage. 77% do not understand how the government uses their data, and 67% feel similarly about companies. Additionally, there is strong support for more government regulation, with 72% of Americans believing that companies should face more oversight regarding personal information handling.

Despite concerns, Americans remain skeptical about their ability to protect their data. While 78% trust themselves to make decisions about online privacy, 61% feel their actions won't make a significant impact. Racial and ethnic differences are also evident, with Hispanic, Black, and Asian adults more concerned about identity theft and data misuse compared to White adults.

Public trust in social media companies is low. 77% of Americans distrust social media executives' ability to admit mistakes regarding data misuse, while 76% are skeptical about their commitment to prevent unauthorized data sales.

=== Communication privacy ===
In the context of digital privacy, communication privacy is the notion that individuals should have the freedom, or right, to communicate information digitally with the expectation that their communications are secure—meaning that messages and communications will only be accessible to the sender's original intended recipient.

However, communications can be intercepted or delivered to other recipients without the sender's knowledge, in a multitude of ways. Communications can be intercepted directly through various hacking methods, such as the man-in-the-middle attack (MITM). Communications can also be delivered to recipients unbeknown to the sender due to false assumptions made regarding the platform or medium that was used to send information. For example, the failure to read a company's privacy policy regarding communications on their platform could lead one to assume that their communication is protected when it is in fact not. Additionally, companies frequently have been known to lack transparency in how they use information, which can be both intentional and unintentional. Discussion of communication privacy necessarily requires consideration of technological methods of protecting information/communication in digital mediums, the effectiveness and ineffectiveness of such methods/systems, and the development/advancement of new and current technologies.

Many scholars have used communication privacy management (CPM) theory as a way to define control over private information. By sharing information with others through social media, the ownership of that information becomes collective.

=== Individual privacy ===
In the context of digital privacy, individual privacy is the individual right or concepts surrounding data privacy (such as its collection, storage, redistribution, and repurposing), online tracking, surveillance. Such information can entail personally identifiable information (PII), which may be combined with other users' data with the purposes of anonymising data through the aggregate. However, this data can typically be re-identified through unique identifiers and other various methods.

Data can be collected without the user's knowledge through manners such as fingerprinting; services such as TikTok, Meta, and Google use fingerprinting techniques to make a unique profile of a single user across various websites.

Measures can be taken by a user to reduce collected information by providers; software such anonymous VPN services, onion routing, and content blockers can reduce data collected by providers. However, paradoxically, anti-fingerprinting/data collection measures can in turn make the user more uniquely identifiable, as trackers will notice lack of data, which is in itself identifiable data.

=== Information anonymity ===
For a user to keep their information anonymous when accessing the web, onion routing can be used to ensure the protection of their personally identifiable information.

Onion routing was originally developed by the U.S. Naval Research Lab and was intended to anonymize web traffic. The system created a path to any TCP/IP server by creating a pathway of onion routers. Once a pathway has been established, all information that is sent through it is anonymously delivered. When the user has finished utilizing the pathway it was essentially deleted which freed the resources to be used for a new pathway within onion routing. The Onion Routing Project developed into what is today known as Tor, a completely open-sourced and free software. Unlike its predecessor, Tor is able to protect both the anonymity of individuals as well as web providers. This allows people to set up anonymous web servers that in effect provide a censorship-resistant publishing service.

=== Communication anonymity ===
While the previously mentioned information anonymity system can also potentially protect the contents of communications between two people, there are other systems that directly function to guarantee that communication remains between its intended recipients.

One of these systems, Pretty Good Privacy (PGP), has existed in various forms for many years. It functions to protect email messages by encrypting and decrypting them. It originally existed as a command-line-only program, but it has evolved in recent years to have its own full interface, and a multitude of email providers now offer built-in PGP support. Users can also install PGP-compatible software and manually configure it to encrypt emails on nearly any platform.

Secure Sockets Layer (SSL) and Transport Layer Security (TLS) are measures to secure payments online. While these systems are not immune from breaches or failure, many users benefit greatly from their use as every major browser program has built-in support for it.

=== Additional services ===
There are additional methods that work to provide anonymity and, by extension, protect the user's data.

As IP addresses can frequently be traced back to a specific physical location, and likewise can identify someone as well, changing one's IP address can help users remain anonymous by providing access to a multitude of servers in various geographic locations around the world, allowing them to appear as if they are physically located in a selected area, even when they are not. This is an example of a method/service that works to allow for information and communication anonymity. IP-address changers are one such service, which an internet user typically pays a fee to use.

The Virtual Private Network (VPN) is a technology that provides users secured connection over a non-secure public network such as the Internet through several tunneling protocols, handling, and encapsulating traffic at different levels to ensure communication security. VPN is also effective in securing data and privacy over the cloud and data-center environments because it is capable of protecting IPs from exposure to different kinds of attacks. This technology can be categorized into SSL VPN and IPSec VPN, which are methods of data communication from a user device to a VPN gateway using a secure tunnel. There is also the case of the VHSP mechanism, which protects the exposure of an IP address by assigning a temporal IP for the VPN gateway and its services.

The use of network address translation (NAT) allows users to hide connections passing through a gateway behind the gateway through the use of a sensible hiding IP address that is routable to the issuing gateway.

=== The (no) harm principle ===
Following the (no) harm principle of John Stuart Mill, private references must be respected: one can do whatever they want as long as others do not suffer from the consequences of it. In one's private space, alone, a person is free to do whatever they desire.

With the advent of photojournalism, the invasion of celebrities' private lives arose along with the notion of right-to-privacy—or what Samuel D. Warren II and Louis Brandeis branded in 1890 as "the right to be left alone." Today's "privacy incidents" do not exclusively concern celebrities and politicians, as most people are connected and share data: people are not online to be left alone.

== The economic value of data ==
According to Alessandro Acquisti, Curtis Taylor and Liad Wagman in The Economics of Privacy (2015), individual data can be seen as having two types of value: a commercial value and a private value. The fact that data is collected can have both positive and negative effects, and can cause a violation of privacy and a monetary cost. As per Acquisti, Taylor, and Wagman, there are further concerns about the progress of collecting data as data analysis becomes increasingly more efficient.

Various legislative frameworks, such as the EU Data Protection Directive and the United States Children's Online Privacy Protection Act (COPPA), have been established to regulate digital privacy. However, due to the continuous and rapid evolution of the information technology (IT) sector, current privacy models increasingly emphasize the necessity of user empowerment and self-management of online privacy. As such, it is critical for the lawmakers to continue focusing on the right balance between the use of the internet and the economics of privacy.

== Privacy and information breaches ==
Methods can be purposely crafted to obtain one's personal information illegally. These directed attacks are commonly referred to as hacking, though that term refers to the general practice and does not address specific hacking methods and implementation. Various hacking methods as it pertains to the invasion of one's digital privacy are outlined below. As it pertains to intent, within hacking, there are two categories of invasion:

1. Directed attacks against someone individually, and
2. Directed attacks against groups.

With the latter category, however, a hacker could effectively obtain a specified/particular individual's information through first targeting a larger group. An example of this possibility could be as follows: if a hacker, named individual-A, wishes to obtain a particular person's information, individual-B, they could first target a platform or group that has individual-B's information already, such as a credit agency, or they could likewise target a group that individual-B has previously relinquished/provided their data to, like a social media network or a cloud based data service. Through targeting one of those groups, individual-A could effectively obtain individual-B's information by first hacking all data the group has, including the data of other individuals. Once obtained, the hacker could simply identify individual-B's information within the data and disregard the rest. Digital tools are available online to help thwart personal data theft.

=== Phishing ===
Phishing is a common method of obtaining someone's private information. This generally consists of an individual (often referred in this context as a hacker), developing a website that looks similar to other major websites that a target person commonly uses. The phishing website may look identical to the legitimate site, but its URL could have a variation in spelling or a different domain such as .org instead of .com. The target person can be directed to the site through a link in a "fake" email that is designed to look like it came from the website they commonly use. The user then clicks on the URL, proceeds to sign in, or provide other personal information, and as opposed to the information being submitted to the website that the user thought they were on, it is actually sent directly to the hacker. Phishing attacks commonly obtain bank and financial data as well as social networking website information.

Online tools can help users protect their information from phishing attacks, including Web browser extensions, which are capable of flagging suspicious websites and links.

== Digital Privacy and Law Enforcement ==
Law enforcement has the ability to access users' private data. However, many companies like Ring state in their Terms of Service that they do not disclose user information to law enforcement unless the request is properly served on them and required of them to comply. Through different court orders like subpoenas and search warrants, law enforcement can access user information, stored content, or other metadata.

== Development and controversy ==
Digital privacy is a trending social concern. For example, over the past decade, the usage of the phrase digital privacy has increased by more than fivefold in published books. A TED talk by Eric Berlow and Sean Gourley following the 2013 mass surveillance disclosures cast a shadow over the privacy of cloud storage and social media. While digital privacy is concerned with the privacy of digital information in general, in many contexts it specifically refers to information concerning personal identity shared over public networks.

As the secrecy of the American Foreign Intelligence Surveillance Act becomes widely disclosed, digital privacy is increasingly recognized as an issue in the context of mass surveillance. Prior to the Edward Snowden disclosures concerning the extent of the NSA PRISM program were revealed in 2013, the public debate on digital privacy mainly centered on privacy concerns with social-networking services, as viewed from within these services. Even after 2013, scandals related to social-media privacy issues have continued to attract public attention. The most notable of these is the coverage of the Facebook–Cambridge Analytica data scandal in 2018, which led to a 66% decrease in public trust of Facebook.

The use of cryptographic software to evade prosecution and harassment while sending and receiving information over computer networks is associated with crypto-anarchism, a movement intending to protect individuals from mass surveillance by the government.

Digital privacy breaches, including mass identity theft, are on the rise. In 2024, an error by background check company MC2 Data exposed 106 million records containing personal information about U.S. citizens.

== See also ==
- Internet privacy
- Tor (network)
- Digital Footprint
- Identity theft (personal data theft)
