= Unveiled: The Mother/Daughter Relationship =

- Directed by: Maureen Judge
- Produced by: Silva Basmajian; Maureen Judge; Janis Lundman
- Cinematography: Harald Bachmann; Rudolf Blahacek
- Edited by: Miume Jan Eramo
- Music by: Aaron Davis; John Lang
- Production companies: Makin' Movies; National Film Board of Canada
- Distributed by: Knowledge Network; TVOntario
- Release date: May 14, 1997
- Running time: 55 minutes
- Country: Canada
- Language: English

Unveiled: The Mother/Daughter Relationship is a Canadian short documentary film, directed by Maureen Judge and released in 1997. The film depicts the complexities of the relationship between mothers and daughters through the planning of weddings, including two families whose daughters are getting married and one where the bride-to-be is the widowed mother.

The film was broadcast on May 14, 1997, as an episode of the TVOntario documentary series The View from Here.

The film won the Genie Award for Best Short Documentary Film at the 18th Genie Awards.
