= Maureen Judge =

Canadian filmmaker

Maureen Judge is a Canadian Screen Awards (CSA) winning filmmaker and television producer. Much of her work is documentary and explores themes of love, betrayal and acceptance in the context of the modern family, with the most recent films focusing on the dreams and challenges of contemporary youth.

== Biography ==
Judge was born in Montreal, Quebec and is one of eight children. As a child, she lived in Montreal, Quebec; Kingston, Ontario; and Chicago, Illinois, before moving to Toronto, Ontario in 1967.

She received a Bachelor of Arts degree from The University of Toronto in science and philosophy. In 1982 she earned a Master of Arts degree in cinema studies from New York University. Judge lives in Toronto with her husband and has two grown children.

Judge has directed and produced a number of documentary films, television series and a few dramatic shorts. Among her best known films are My Millennial Life, winner of the Academy of Canadian Cinema and Television’s CSA Award for Best Documentary Program (2017) and Unveiled: The Mother Daughter Relationship, winner of the Academy of Canadian Cinema and Television's Genie Award for Best Short Documentary (1997).

She began television series producing in 2002 when she created and produced the 13-episode series, Family Secrets and the Canadian poetry series Heart of a Poet in 2006.

In 2008 Judge produced the documentary film FLicKeR winner of the Hot Docs Special Jury Prize for a Canadian Feature Length Documentary and Best Film on International Art at the 2009 Era New Horizons Film Festival in Poland, FLicKeR was also nominated for a 2009 Gemini Award. Her following film Mom's Home (2010) was nominated for the Donald Brittain Award for Best Social-Political Documentary at the Gemini Awards.

Her films include award-winning documentaries: And We Knew How To Dance: Women and World War I, produced by the National Film Board of Canada, In My Parents' Basement and Living Dolls (2015).

Judge was a founding member of CineAction Magazine in 1986, contributing an article on the film Death Watch to its first issue, and has taught film studies and production at York University, Humber College and Sheridan College in Toronto.

== Filmography ==
Selected films:

- Family Business (dramatic short), writer/director, 1984
- A Venerable Occasion (dramatic short), writer/director, 1986
- Altered Ego (comedy/drama featurette), writer, director, 1991
- And We Knew How to Dance: Women and WWI (documentary) researcher/director, 1994
- Unveiled: The Mother/Daughter Relationship (documentary) producer/director, 1997
- In My Parents' Basement (documentary), producer/director, 2002
- FLicKeR (documentary), executive producer/producer, 2008
- Mom's Home: The August Years of May and Gloria (documentary), producer/writer/director, 2010
- Living Dolls: The Subculture of Doll Collecting (documentary), producer/writer/director, 2013
- My Millennial Life (cross platform documentary), producer/writer/director, 2016
- 17 And Life Doesn’t Wait (documentary), producer/writer/director, 2019

Selected television:

- Family Secrets (documentary series) creator/writer/producer, 2003
  - "Blowing Out the Candles" (Family Secrets episode), producer/director, 2003
  - "Best Laid Plans" (Family Secrets episode), producer, 2003
  - "Introducing Debbie" (Family Secrets episode), producer/director, 2003
  - "Loss and Found" (Family Secrets episode), producer, 2003
  - "Love Behind Bars" (Family Secrets episode), producer, 2003
  - "Second Helping" (Family Secrets episode), producer, 2003
  - "Birth Mothers Never Forget" (Family Secrets episode), producer/director, 2004
  - "Erase the Day" (Family Secrets episode), producer, 2004
  - "Looking for 7s" (Family Secrets episode), producer, 2004
  - "From Mild to Completely Severe" (Family Secrets episode), producer, 2004
  - "Beyond Baby Blues" (Family Secrets episode), producer, 2004
  - "Almost Normal" (Family Secrets episode), producer, 2004
  - "When Nobody's Looking" (Family Secrets episode), producer/director, 2004

== Heart of a Poet ==
Heart of a Poet is a Canadian television documentary series that premiered in April 2006, created by Maureen Judge and Tina Hahn and executive produced by Maureen Judge. The production is broadcast on Bravo!. The series aired for two seasons, running from April 13, 2006 through November 29, 2007.

Each episode of the series profiled the life, literature, and performances of a different working Canadian poet. The poets are introduced through samples of their writing, interviews, recitals, and the observational footage of the experiences that make up their daily lives and influence their poetry.

Some of the poets featured in the series include George Elliott Clarke, bill bissett, Christian Bök, Marty Gervais, Lillian Allen, Shane Koyczan, Ray Hsu, and Daphne Marlatt.

== Awards ==
- Unveiled: The Mother/Daughter Relationship
  - Genie Award, Best Short Documentary, Academy of Canadian Film & Television (1998)
  - Gold Award: Social/Political Documentary, Chicago International Film Festival Intercom (1997)
- Family Secrets
  - Honorable Mention: Documentary Film, Family Secrets: When Nobody's Looking, Columbus International Film & Video Festival (2003)
- FLicKeR
  - Special Jury Prize: Canadian Feature Documentary, Hot Docs (2008)
  - Best Film on International Art: Era New Horizons Film Festival (2009)
  - Nominated: Best Performing Arts Program or Series or Arts Documentary Program or Series, Gemini Award (2009)
- Mom's Home
  - Nominated: Donald Brittain Award for Best Social/Political Documentary Program Gemini Award (2011)
  - Nominated: Best Picture Editing in a Documentary Program or Series Gemini Award (2011)
- Living Dolls
  - Gold Medal, Documentary Directing, New York Festivals
  - Best POV Documentary Award, Yorkton Film Festival
  - Nomination: Best Documentary, Austin Film Festival
  - Shaw-Hot Docs Completion Award
- My Millennial Life
  - Winner: Canadian Screen Award, Best Documentary Program
  - Winner: New York Festivals, Documentary, Gold Medal
  - Nominated: Canadian Screen Award, Best Cross Platform Project (non-fiction)
- 17 And Life Doesn’t Wait
  - Nominated: Canadian Screen Award, Best Picture Editing (documentary)
