= Ray Hsu =

Canadian professor

- Born: Canada
- Education: University of Toronto, University of Wisconsin–Madison
- Occupation: Professor
- Writing career
- Notable works: Cold Sleep Permanent Afternoon, Anthropy

Ray Hsu was a Canadian professor at the University of British Columbia. His primary research areas are virtual reality, augmented reality, and mixed reality.

== Biography ==
Hsu grew up in Toronto, Ontario. He received an Honours B.A. and an M.A. from the University of Toronto and a Ph.D. from the University of Wisconsin–Madison. He was a Postdoctoral Fellow at the University of British Columbia. He conducts research at the University of British Columbia's Emerging Media Lab and teaches at the Social Justice Institute.

In 2007, Hsu and his work were the subject of an episode of the television documentary series produced by Canadian filmmaker Maureen Judge.

In 2013, he was named one of Vancouver's "most promising entrepreneurs" by the Globe and Mail.

In 2017, he was a keynote speaker at Re-animating & Re-searching: Mobilizing Knowledge in Education.

== Books ==
- Anthropy (2004)
- Cold Sleep Permanent Afternoon (2010)

== Awards ==
- Gerald Lampert Award (2005)
- Lyman S.V. Judson and Ellen Mackechnie Judson Award (2007)
