= Communication privacy management theory =

Theory of privacy in interpersonal communication

Communication privacy management (CPM), originally known as communication boundary management, is a systematic research theory developed by Sandra Petronio in 1991. CPM theory aims to develop an evidence-based understanding of the way people make decisions about revealing and concealing private information. It suggests that individuals maintain and coordinate privacy boundaries (the limits of what they are willing to share) with various communication partners depending on the perceived benefits and costs of information disclosure. Petronio believes disclosing private information will strengthen one's connections with others, and that we can better understand the rules for disclosure in relationships through negotiating privacy boundaries.

Petronio uses a boundary metaphor to explain the privacy management process. Privacy boundaries draw divisions between private information and public information. This theory argues that when people disclose private information, they depend on a rule-based management system to control the level of accessibility. An individual's privacy boundary governs his or her self-disclosures. Once a disclosure is made, the negotiation of privacy rules between the two parties is required. A distressing sense of "boundary turbulence" can arise when clashing expectations for privacy management are identified, or when preexisting expectations are breached, intentionally or unintentionally. Having the mental image of protective boundaries is central to understanding the five core principles of Petronio's CPM:

1. People believe they own and have a right to control their private information.
2. People control their private information through the use of personal privacy rules.
3. When others are told or given access to a person's private information, they become co-owners of that information.
4. Co-owners of private information need to negotiate mutually agreeable privacy rules about telling others.
5. When co-owners of private information do not effectively negotiate and follow mutually held privacy rules, boundary turbulence is the likely result.

== Background ==
Petronio's communication privacy management (CPM) theory is built on Altman's dialectical conception of privacy as a process of opening and closing a boundary to others. Altman and Taylor's social penetration theory focused on self-disclosure as the primary way to develop close relationships. However, Altman believed that openness was just one part belonging to a larger whole, one which expanded to include privacy with Leslie A. Baxter's work on relational dialectics theory. When Petronio first developed this theory in 1991, it was called communication boundary management. In 2002, she renamed it to communication privacy management, underscoring "disclosure of private information" as the crux of the theory.

== Theory elements ==
=== Private information ===
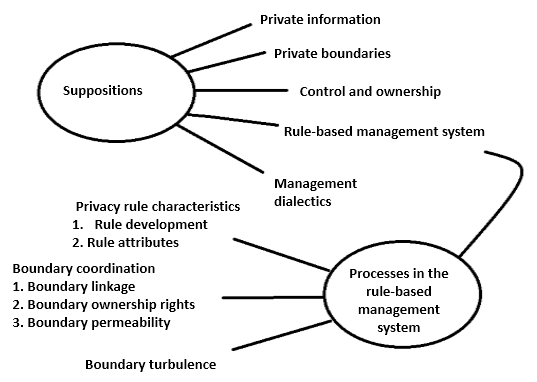

The content of concealing and revealing is private information. Petronio favored the term "private information" over the term "self-disclosure" because there are many caveats inherent to private information disclosure that are not present with self-disclosure. Firstly, the motivations behind sharing are many, including but not limited to: sharing a burden, righting a wrong, and influencing others. Since private information can be about oneself or others, the decision as to what is private and whom to share it with plays a part when taking the idea of boundaries into consideration. The decision to share is ultimately left up to the process of the privacy rule management system which combines rules for coordination of information, characteristics of disclosure, and attributes of the nature of boundaries.

- Shareholder

A confidant who is fully committed to handle private information by abiding in the original owner's privacy rules.

- Stakeholder

Someone who shares should have access to the private information based on what they have the lose if the information is disclosed.

- Deliberate confidant

Someone who seeks out private information.

=== Private boundaries ===
To understand CPM theory it is important to follow the metaphor of the boundary. Private boundaries are the division between private information and public information. When private information is shared, there will be a collective boundary. When private information remains with an individual and is not disclosed, the boundary is called a personal boundary. An individual's private information is protected by their boundaries. The permeability of these boundaries are ever-changing. Boundaries can be relatively permeable (easy to cross) or relatively impregnable (rigid and difficult to cross).

==== Boundary coordination ====
An individual's private information is protected by the individual's boundaries. The permeability of these boundaries are ever-changing, and allow certain parts of the public access to certain pieces of information belonging to the individual. Sharing private information is a risky decision and puts the owner of the information in a vulnerable position. Therefore, rules surrounding the boundaries must be negotiated to protect the shared information. Once private information is shared, co-owners must coordinate the boundaries of privacy and disclosure based on boundary permeability, boundary linkage, and boundary ownership. Petronio describes this mutual boundary coordination by co-owners as drawing the same borders on a map around a shared piece of information. This a difficult process, considering that each owner will approach the information from distinct viewpoints and referencing their personal criteria for privacy rule development.

- Boundary permeability is the nature of the invisible divisions that keep private information from being known outside of an individual or particular group. When private information is kept with one owner, the boundaries are said to be thick because there is less possibility for information to make its way out into the public sphere. Once information is shared to one or more persons, the boundaries for that private information expand, become more permeable, and are considered thin.
- Boundary linkage is how owners are connected when they build associations through a boundary. For example, doctors and patients are linked to each other in such a way that private information is passed within their boundaries constantly. These linkages can be strong or weak depending on how information was shared or whether a co-owner wanted to know or was prepared to learn a new piece of information. Case in point, the link between an organization and a spy meant to infiltrate the organization is weak because the two are not coordinated on how information will be maintained private or disclosed.
- Boundary ownership is the responsibilities and rights each person has over the control of the spread of information that they own. When working to mutually create the boundary of privacy it is key for all parties to have a clear understanding of whether information should be shared, who it should be shared with, and when it should be shared. A simple example of this is the planning of a surprise birthday party; all those involved in planning must agree on how the information about the party will be spread so as not to ruin the surprise. As new guests are invited, they become an owner of the information and are bound to the rules of privacy maintenance, or else the surprise could be ruined.
- Fuzzy boundaries are parts of confidential information that have not been discussed in a confidentiality agreement. One or both parties are not sure if that information can be shared with outside parties. Once information is known by others who are not the original owner they may have their own interpretation of how the information can be shared.

==== Boundary turbulence ====
Often, boundaries are not coordinated as well as they should be to maintain the level of privacy or exposure desired by owners – this leads to problems known as boundary turbulence. The coordination of shared boundaries is key to avoiding over-sharing. When the boundaries are unclear, owners may come into conflict with one another. Turbulence among co-owners is caused when rules are not mutually understood by co-owners and when the management of private information comes into conflict with the expectations each owner had, which can happen for a number of reasons.

Boundary turbulence can be caused by mistakes, such as an uninvited party overhearing private information (causing weak boundary linkage) or a disclosure an owner might make under the influence of alcohol or other drugs. Disclosure to a new party was not the intent, but, when it happens, other co-owners can feel that their expectations of maintaining boundaries have been violated.

In addition, boundary turbulence occurs when a co-owner intentionally breaks the coordinated boundary of privacy to disclose private information. An example of such intentional disclosure would be a daughter revealing to a doctor that her father is indeed an active smoker when the father has told the doctor that he no longer smokes after his heart surgery. The daughter in this case must weigh the risks of breaking the family privacy boundary against the benefits of the doctor being better informed of her father's condition.

Lastly, boundary turbulence can also occur when there have not been pre-existing rules for a situation. For example, with the emergence of social media and, in particular, Facebook, boundary rules had not been established. As parents began to join Facebook and "friend" their children, the children felt turbulence. There was a perception of privacy invasion between the parent-child relationship.

In cases of boundary turbulence, co-owners of information can feel that their expectations have been violated and lose trust in other co-owners. In these cases, the goal of each party is to reduce turbulence by reestablishing and coordinating boundaries. Turbulence does not always have a negative outcome, there has been studies which show that turbulence within relationships can lead to stronger and improved relationships. Boundary violations and boundary turbulence can be used as a learning opportunity for individuals to renegotiate existing boundaries or better form new boundaries in similar situations. Boundary turbulence is experienced differently by each individual, and reactions to violations can depend on how many new boundary linkages are created and how many new people the private information reaches. These factors can determine whether boundary turbulence can cause distress to a relationship or be a learning experience.

Personal and collective boundaries

=== Control and ownership ===
Communication privacy management theory understands information (as well as boundaries) as something that is owned, and each owner must decide whether or not they are willing to have a confidant, i.e. a co-owner, to that information. In some cases, it is preferable for the owner to have another person share the private information, though this may not be the case for the confidant. Co-ownership of information is characterized by two things: heavy responsibility and a knowledge of the rules for a particular disclosure. However, ownership can be felt to different degrees, and the understanding of disclosure rules can be different from owner to owner. Also, the act of sharing is coupled along with the realization that boundaries have expanded and that they may never return to their original state. It is the responsibility of co-owners to decide and make clear if, when, and how information can or should be shared with others. Sometimes, a confidentiality agreement is not evenly shared. For instance, a client at a barber shop shares their life story with the barber, the barber may not feel as much pressure to hold up their end of the disclosure agreement since they barely know each other. However, a counselor who is bound by law to not leak private information will not be a risk to breach that trust.

=== Rule-based management system ===

Petronio views boundary management as a rule based process, not an individual decision. This rule-based management system allows for management on the individual and collective levels. This system depends on three privacy rule management to regulate the process of revealing and concealing private information: privacy rule characteristics, boundary coordination, and boundary turbulence.

==== Privacy rule characteristics ====
The characteristics of privacy rules are divided into two sections, attributes and development. Privacy rule attributes refer to how people obtain rules of privacy and understand the properties of those rules. This is normally done through social interactions where the boundaries for rules are put to the test. Rules are set in different social situations which dictate the type of disclosure that should be made, for example, the difference between disclosure at a family member's birthday party versus an office event at work. Petronio asserts that each situation will come with its own set of rules for managing privacy that are learned over time. The development of privacy rule characteristics has to do with the criteria implemented to decide if and how information will be shared. Communication privacy management theory general lists those criteria as the following:

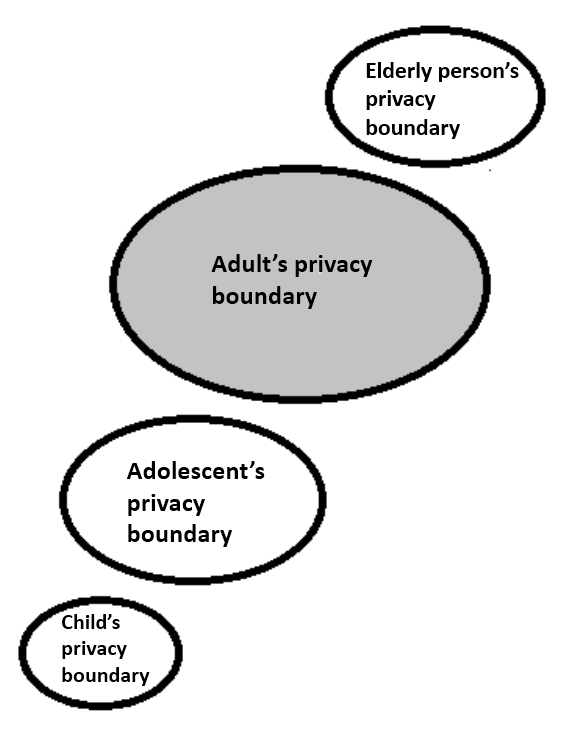

Decision Criteria	Category	Definition	Example
Cultural	core	Disclosure depends on the norms for privacy and openness in a given culture.	The United States favors more openness in relational communication than does Japan
Gender	core	Privacy boundaries are sculpted differently by men and women based on socialization, which leads to difference in how rules are understood and operated in	American women are socialized to disclose more than men. Men are more comfortable talking to women about their private information as opposed to the same sex. However, women enjoy talking to the same sex as opposed to the opposite.
Context	catalyst	Shaped by issues of physical and social environments that factor in whether or not information will be shared	In a traumatic situation (e.g., surviving an earthquake together), we will develop new rules
Motivation	catalyst	Owners of information can form certain bonds that lead to disclosure, or conversely the express interest in forming bonds may cause private information to be shared. Motivations for sharing can include reciprocity or self-clarification.	If you have disclosed a great deal to me, out of reciprocity, I might be motivated to disclose to you
Risk/benefit ratio	catalyst	Owners of private information evaluate risks relative to the benefits of disclosure or maintaining information private.	Our rules are influenced by our assessment of the ratio of risks to benefits of disclosing

With these five criteria, personal and group privacy rules are developed, but disclosure of private information necessitates the inclusion of others within the boundary of knowledge, which demands an understanding between parties for how to coordinate ownership of knowledge.

=== Management dialectics ===
Petronio's understanding and argument of privacy management rests on the idea that a dialectic exists wherever the decision is made to disclose or conceal private information. Thus, costs and benefits must be weighed and consideration must be given to how such information will be owned, used, and spread. The definition of dialectic that Petronio borrows from can be found in Leslie Baxter and Barbara Montgomery's theory of relational dialectics, wherein various approaches to the contradictory impulses of relational life are discussed. The theory focuses on the idea that there are not only two contradictory stances within a relationship, were weighed using multiple viewpoints.

== Theory applications ==
To validate the effectiveness and feasibility of the communication privacy management theoretical frameworks, Petronio tested them using different methods including and not limited to qualitative and quantitative research. These approaches helped other researchers translate research into practice in different fields and enabled CPM to be applied across different contexts, primarily include: (1) family communication, with a particular focus on parental privacy invasions, (2) online social media, (3) health, and (4) relational issues, and (5) work environments.

=== Family communication ===
Specific applications of CPM highlight family privacy management. Research focused on secrets and topic avoidance, such as questions of concealment to stepfamily members feeling caught, and parents-adolescent conversations about sex. Family privacy research over the decades are also inspired specifically by the chapter of parental privacy invasion. For example, work by Hawk and his colleagues explore perceived parental invasions from the view of adolescents in reaction to such issues as control attempts, solicitation of information, and conflict outcomes. Another way that family communication uses CPM is with child bearing or the lack thereof; CPM has been used to explore whom childless couples choose to disclose to that they voluntarily do not want children.

Pregnancy loss due to miscarriage could be a unique CPM case in the family setting as couples often manage this information jointly as they decide whether to share the miscarriage with people outside the dyad. The research found that couples frame miscarriage as a shared but distinct experience and that both members exert rights of ownership over the information. According to one study, "Couples' privacy rules centered on issues of social support and others' need to know about the loss. Even though couples described their privacy rules as implicitly understood, they also recalled having explicit conversations to develop rules. We discuss how the management of co-owned information can improve communication and maintain relationships." Another study examines obstetric fistulas' effects in developing countries. The study looks at how women handle their diagnosis and how they share the information they receive. The study found that the majority of women hide their diagnosis due to the effects that come after others know.

=== Online social media ===
Recent researchers apply CPM to investigate privacy management for online blogging, Facebook usage and online dating. Further, there have been investigations into parental behavior that is enacted through online social media; specifically when parents 'friend' their children and the management of privacy that ensues from that. Privacy practices in social network sites often appear paradoxical, as content-sharing behavior stands in conflict with the need to reduce disclosure-related harms. One study explored privacy in social network sites as a contextual information practice, managed by a process of boundary regulation. Disclosing private information online functions differently than disclosing private information in face to face instances. The mediated nature of social media means that it can be harder to control who sees what information and how that information can be spread. Thus, it is harder to control boundaries and linkage. Trust and risk management become important factors in sharing information online.

As social media continues to develop and become an essential part in everyday life, more younger audiences are attuned to how much information is under surveillance. Surveillance from family, schools and potential employers means individuals cannot fully control the boundaries and co-owners of their private information, which has implications for what is shared and how individuals present themselves online.

An issue that often can arise within families is the amount of information posted to the internet by one's parents without their permission. Parents often post family photos of their children or accomplishments without contacting their children first. One study, in particular, analyzed the children's responses to the information being posted by their parents. The results depended on the type of information posted and the details and photos included.

==== Facebook ====
Since Facebook is one of the most popular social media platforms, many researchers employed communication privacy management theory as a theoretical framework to examine the individual boundary management practices and privacy concerns of self-disclosure on this important platform. Sandra Petronio and other researchers used CPM to study young adults' tendencies to manage their privacy and communicate on Facebook with different generations of family members. 383 respondents participated in a survey concerning their online and offline Facebook communication with other family members. The study found that young adults share their information mainly with their siblings followed by their parents and finally their grandparents. Another case study analyzing the responses of 240 participants revealed that the communication privacy practices by individuals using Facebook strongly impact the "amount and depth" of their self-disclosure. One more study explored how colleagues in the professional context respond to friend requests from other co-workers. The study provided evidence that co-workers' connection on Facebook improves only when each party understands the rules which govern privacy management. In an exploratory study on privacy management in two social media platforms, Facebook and Snapchat, showed that Facebook users are less likely to share their private information compared to users of other social media platforms. A related study showed that the more "friends" one had on their social media platform, the less they were willing to share. A differing study found that Facebook subscribers are more open and willing to share their private information with distant friends rather than the close ones. These examples demonstrate how Facebook users are aware of the fact that they do not have full control over the ownership of their information and this affects their decisions on what and how to share on Facebook.

==== Blogging ====
Jeffrey T. Child, Judy C. Pearson and Sandra Petronio have used CPM to develop the Blogging Privacy Management Measure (BPPM), a model through which researchers can look at privacy management in blogging specifically. Because blogging is a mediated activity, the BPPM can be used to look at the implications of online blog disclosures, such as when the privacy boundaries are misinterpreted by readers. A study using the BPPM found that young bloggers were likely to reveal more private information online rather than in person, because the medium gives more control. Bloggers who had "higher self-monitoring skills" tended to be more private and careful with their disclosures. Bloggers with a high "concern for appropriateness" tended to curate the perfect desired image of who they wanted to be online, and disclosed private information to fit that image.

Similar research has been done on the perceptions of teachers' disclosures on Facebook and their impact on credibility. The relevance and valence of disclosures were compared between disclosures made in the classroom and those made on Facebook and were found to be significantly different. Students' perceptions of teacher credibility were shown to decrease as relevance of disclosures increased and as negativity increased.

==== Twitter ====
Another popular SNS, Twitter, was examined as well. In the research, Twitter was regarded as an onion with multiple privacy layers. The research found out that there were significant differences at the descriptive and inferential levels among the multiple dimensions of private information, including daily lives, social identity, competence, socio-economic status, and health. Private information regarding daily lives and entertainment was disclosed easily and located at the outermost layer of the disclosure onion. In contrast, health-related private information was concealed and located within the innermost layer of the disclosure onion. What's more, there were significant differences among current Twitter users, nonusers, and dropouts with regard to personality traits and privacy concerns about Twitter.

Young people, especially high school and college students, are an important part of SNS users. A recent study examined college students' privacy concerns and impacts on their Twitter usage behaviors. Regression analyses concluded that Control and Boundary Rules of Private Information on Twitter significantly predict daily minutes spent on Twitter accounts. However, the same CPM variables did not predict college students' other Twitter usage behaviors (e.g., weekly inquiries and total months of using Twitter). This shows the intricate connection between students' privacy concern and their usage behavior.

=== Health communication ===
Informed by principles of CPM, health communication research using CPM to explore health privacy issues has become a growth area. Earlier study investigated physician disclosure of medical mistakes. Recently there have been a number of studies focused on ways that privacy issues influence patient care, confidentiality and control over ownership, choices about disclosure, for instance, with stigmatized health-related illness such as HIV/AIDS, e-health information, reproductive information, and the digitization of healthcare.

One recent study about how overweight and obese individuals handle their personal history after they become a normal weight. The result shows that the vast majority of participants perceived more benefits from disclosing their larger identity than risks, regardless of weight-loss method.

Trust in health care providers is an important factor in determining whether a patient is comfortable disclosing private health information. In a health context, race may be a core factor in whether or not a patient trusts medical professionals, and race can impact how privacy rules between an individual and a doctor develop.

Using CPM, Celebrity Health Narratives & the Public Health offers the "first extensive look at celebrity health sagas, this book examines the ways in which their stories become our stories, influencing public perception and framing dialog about wellness, disease and death. These private-yet-public narratives drive fund-raising, reduce stigma and influence policy. Celebrities such as Mary Tyler Moore, Robin Roberts, Michael J. Fox, and Christopher Reeve—as well as 200 others included in the study—have left a lasting legacy."

Health related situations can include a "forced disclosure" incident, such as when young adults are still under their parents' health insurance plans and do not have full control over what private health information is shared. Because the parents support their child financially by paying for insurance, individuals can feel that parents have a right to this information. For those that feel that health information should solely be under the ownership of the individual, boundary turbulence can occur.

=== Relationship issues ===
Many studies emphasize the use of CPM in relationships because of the concepts of disclosure and boundaries. Not only romantic relationships, but also friendships are a factor when thinking of CPM. In any relationship, it has been found that men are less willing to share their private information with others. It has also been found that those within the LGBTQ+ community are less likely to share their feelings with anyone. Disclosures in friendships have been studied because of how important friendships are to one's identity, especially at a young age. When a person is unable to disclose information to friends or loved ones, it can exacerbate issues because they do not feel supported. Thus, researchers use CPM to understand why and how private disclosures happen in friendships. Briefly, work on conflict and topic avoidance, considering the relational impact of privacy turbulence, students and faculty relationships, and workplace relationships have all produced useful information that opens new doors regarding CPM-based research.

The mobile phone and its impact on romantic relationships is a good example. After investigating mobile phone usage rules that are negotiated by adolescents and young adults in romantic relationships, findings show that the negotiation of rules is a crucial part of young adult relationships while enhancing trust and fostering harmony are important factors in the rule development process.

CPM also appears in the friendship. The study intended to addresses the issue of whether personal traits and predispositions can predict the tendencies to either reveal or conceal secrets shared in confidence by a best friend suggested that a combination of several traits could successfully distinguish those who revealed secrets from those who did not. Significant discriminators included tendency to gossip and depth of disclosure. Implications of the study and suggestions for future research are discussed.

Although privacy violations can be uncomfortable and disruptive, they have the potential for positive outcomes in relationships if addressed. Using CPM theory as a framework, a study surveyed a community sample of 273 adults to examine their retrospective accounts of privacy violations in personal relationships. Results showed that less than half of the sample offered explicit rules for information management, and the majority of participants blamed the confidant for the privacy turbulence. Findings indicated that people often do not share similar information with the violator in the future, but if they do, less than half offer explicit privacy rules during the privacy recalibration process. Confrontation efficacy was positively associated with initiating a conversation about the privacy turbulence and that people who engaged in privacy recalibration were more likely to report forgiveness and relational improvement and less likely to report relational damage than those individuals who did not.

=== Voice-Based Assistants ===
With an increase in technological advancement, voice-based assistants have become more frequently used. A recent study was conducted to see whether consumers want to reveal or conceal their information to these voice-based assistants. We often believe only a certain amount of our information is shared, but we are unaware of what is being given to different companies. Another study looked into how much information is shared with companies without our knowledge or permission and found that almost all of our information is shared without getting permission. Many countries have laws regarding personal information and what companies can or cannot use, but the United States is not within that realm.

=== Work environments ===
CPM has become applicable in the workplace as personal mobile devices are increasingly allowed to be brought to work. The concept of bringing your own device (BYOD) has stirred conversation on the concept of privacy, security, and boundaries between employees and employers. Companies have had to take measures to secure their network further or even decide whether they want employees to access personal accounts (i.e., email) or devices while on the job. By the same token, some employees argue that companies should not be able to track what is being done on their personal devices or even on company computers even if they are in the work place. Even before stepping foot into the workplace, CPM can be applied, such as in the interviewing process. How much candidates decide to reveal within an interview and their boundaries in that situation is directly related to CPM. Even interviewing within a job (as a cop, for example) requires a certain sensitivity to people's boundaries and how much private information they are willing to reveal. Various athletic teams use this approach as well, limiting the amount of time an athlete can spend online, as well as monitoring what they can share online.

=== Intercultural communication ===
Several studies tested CPM within intercultural contexts. For instance, a study that examined intercultural privacy management between foreign English teachers and Japanese co-workers uncovered cultural premises. This "study highlights four cultural premises that garner intercultural privacy management between foreign English language teachers (ELTs) and Japanese coworkers (JCWs) in Japan The analysis revealed that ELTs: (a) expected not to be a "free space" for privacy inquisition by JCWs, and (b) expected voluntary reciprocity in (egalitarian) workplace relationships. JCWs viewed: (a) privacy inquisitions as acts of kindness/caring and (b) soliciting help from a supervisor as providing opportunities for better care. This study calls for attention to intercultural privacy management and enhances CPM's cultural criteria." Within the same context, foreign English teachers "employed the following management strategies: (a) withdrawal, (b) cognitive restructuring, (c) independent control, (d) lying, (e) omission, (f) avoidance, and (g) gaijin smashing. Japanese co-workers defined privacy as information that should be hidden and managed such information by: (a) drawing clear boundaries by not talking or changing contexts, and (b) being pre-emptive by demarcating privacy boundaries early on within a relationship."

Cultural differences are often tied to relationships, and can move beyond differences of ethnicity or gender. A 2020 study looked at how CPM functions in mixed orientation marriages, where a heterosexual presenting couple is actually made up of one heterosexual partner and one partner who does not identify as heterosexual. Disclosure of one's sexuality often was an identity-affirming action, as an outsider would not be able to tell otherwise what the partners' sexualities were. After a disclosure, couples were found to manage boundaries for the owned private information in several ways: Inclusive, intersected, interrelated or unified. Dominic Pecoraro also studied privacy management among members of the LGBT community, and included performative face theory and facework into his paradigm of why, when and how queer individuals disclose their sexual identities. Public disclosure via "coming out" normalizes different sexual identities, providing resistance to face threats due to heteronormativity.

Identity plays a large part in disclosure of religion as well. A 2020 study on how and why employees disclose their religious views when they were a part of a minority religion found that employees who felt like their religion was a core part of their identity were more likely to share that part of themselves with their coworkers, because religion was central to their identity.

== Related theories ==
There are a few communication theories related to CPM.

Expectancy violations theory discusses the importance of personal space, territoriality and the expectations individuals have of another person's nonverbal communication. Both expectancy violations theory and CPM are related through how they deal with physical proximity, privacy and how close individuals allow other people to come to them. Both physical and intimate proximity requires boundaries to be crossed or permeated.

Social penetration theory explains how two individuals grow in intimacy and move from one level to the next in their relationships. The popular idea behind social penetration is that individual are like onions; they have layers, and deeper layers represent greater intimacy. For this intimacy to occur, private information needs to be shared and exchanged. As one does this, boundaries are permeated and become co-owned.

Finally, coordinated management of meaning explains how people establish rules for both creating and interpreting meaning. Coordinated management of meaning has stages where coordination is achieved, not achieved, or partially achieved, which are similar to CPM's boundary ownership, boundary turbulence or boundary linkage. Moreover, in order to achieve meaning, there needs to be an exchange of information between individuals to decipher. This exchange of private information falls directly into CPM.

== Academic integration ==
Communication privacy management theory utilizes a socio-cultural communication tradition within an interpersonal context, and employs both a positivistic and interpretive approach to knowing.

== Critique ==
=== Values ===
Altman speaks to the values of this theory as it incorporates different "levels" or combinations of participants in communication processes (Altman 2002). Whereas earlier research and theorizing on privacy-disclosure focused on dyads or individuals, Petronio enunciated a more complicated set of dynamics. Petronio also describes communication within families and between family members and outsiders, within and outside work and social groups, and between many combinations of individuals, dyads, and others within and across social boundaries. In addition, her analysis of privacy-disclosure "turbulence", or breaches of desired communication patterns, is articulate and systematic.

=== Criticism ===
Some researchers have questioned whether CPM theory truly is dialectical in nature. It has argued that CPM takes a dualistic approach, treating privacy and disclosure as independent of one another and able to coexist in tandem rather than in the dynamic interplay characteristic of dialectics. This accusation of dualistic thinking might result from the theory's use of the terms balance and equilibrium in the early versions of CPM theory. Petronio argues that CPM is not focused on balance in the psychological sense. "Instead, [CPM] argues for coordination with others that does not advocate an optimum balance between disclosure and privacy. As an alternative, the theory claims there are shifting forces with a range of privacy and disclosure that people handle by making judgments about the degrees [emphasis in original] of privacy and publicness they wish to experience in any given interaction" (pp. 12–13). Thus, Petronio argues that it is legitimate to call CPM theory dialectical in nature. While boundary ownership is discussed throughout the theory there is no remedy provided for those who break boundary ownership rules. In addition CPM does not offer ways on how to negotiate boundaries between two parties, only that they must be done mutually.

== See also ==
- Privacy
- Self-disclosure
