= Stephanie Schwabe =

German geomicrobiologist, diver and underwater researcher

- Born: January 1, 1957 (age 69); Germany
- Education: University of Queensland; College of Charleston; Mississippi State University; University of Bristol
- Occupations: geomicrobiologist, diver, underwear researcher

Stephanie Jutta Schwabe (born 1 January 1957 in Germany) is a geomicrobiologist. She completed a Ph.D. in the biogeochemical investigation of caves within the Bahamian carbonate platforms. She is an expert geologic diver mostly in Bahamian blues holes, though her experience extends to expeditions in U.S. waters. Diver International named her one of the top cave 40 divers in the world in 1997.

Schwabe earned a degree in law at the University of Queensland with a focus on international environmental law in 2003. She also earned a graduate degrees at the College of Charleston in South Carolina and Mississippi State University, and a doctorate from the University of Bristol in England.

Schwabe works as a professor at the Department of Earth and Environmental Sciences and as a scientist at the University of Kentucky.

Schwabe is a fellow of the Royal Geographical Society of London. She was named a NASA fellow in exobiology for her discovery of a unique life system found only in the black fresh water holes in the Bahamas, and was featured in the book titled Women of Discovery: A Celebration of Intrepid Women Who Explored the World.

In 2004, Schwabe was given the Women of Discovery Award for Courage by Wings WorldQuest.

== Exploration ==
Schwabe began diving in caves either in the mid-1980s or in 1992. Since that time, she has participated in eighteen scientific expeditions to the Bahamas, as subjects for masters and doctoral research. She has participated in a number of film expeditions. In 2000, Schwabe's discovery quest led her to the Black Hole of Andros, Bahamas.

Schwabe discovered a species of purple sulfur bacteria she named Allocromatium palmerii in 2003 after her late husband and diver Rob Palmer.

Schwabe is the founder and director of the Rob Palmer Blues Holes Foundation, a nonprofit organization. The foundation is dedicated to the scientific and physical exploration of blue holes within the Bahamas and related environment. The foundation's goals are to encourage education and conservation of Bahamian caves and blue holes.

Schwabe also describes the Third Man phenomenon that occurred to her while lost as she was solo diving in a cave.

Her husband, British diving pioneer Rob Palmer, died on a pleasure dive in the Red Sea in 1997.

== Bibliography ==
- Stephanie Schwabe and James L. Carew. "Blue Holes: An Inappropriate Moniker for Scientific Discussion of Water-Filled Caves in the Bahamas" (Accessed 3/8/06)
- Schwabe, S. J., and Herbert, R., 2004, Black Holes of the Bahamas: What they are and why they are black: Quaternary International, v. 121, p. 3-11.
- Schwabe, Stephanie. Blue Holes of the Bahamas: A Silent Death Immersed Summer 2001/vol 6, No.2
