= Jim St. James =

Canadian actor and activist

Jim Bozyk (1954–1990), known professionally as Jim St. James, was a Canadian actor and HIV/AIDS activist. He was best known as the star of a series of public service announcements on AIDS awareness which aired on Canadian television in the 1980s, and as the subject of June Callwood's 1988 book Jim: A Life with AIDS.

== Background ==
He was raised in rural Southern Ontario in a Jehovah's Witness family, and was briefly married to a woman. He struggled with his sexuality, and undertook at least one suicide attempt before coming out as gay. Many of his family disowned him when he came out, although he remained in occasional contact with his father. He was also excommunicated from the Jehovah's Witnesses, although he remained devoutly religious in his personal life.

He worked as a stage actor in Toronto for several years, winning an award from Theatre Ontario as best actor in a musical for his performance in a production of Man of La Mancha in 1984. Just two days after winning that award, he was first diagnosed HIV-positive.

== Activism ==
Following his diagnosis, he battled clinical depression for about a year before deciding in 1985 to get on with life, and renewed his commitment to both acting and HIV activism. He was one of the founding members of Toronto's People With AIDS Foundation, appeared in the AIDS-themed documentary film No Sad Songs in 1985 and a production of Robert E. Sherwood's play Idiot's Delight in 1987, and began appearing as a public speaker on HIV and AIDS issues. During this era, he was commonly credited as Canada's longest-living survivor of the disease, and as the country's most prominent HIV/AIDS activist.

In 1987, he appeared in an HIV education segment on CBC Television's youth public affairs program What's New, and in 1988 he starred in several HIV/AIDS awareness commercials, funded by CJOH-TV and the Canadian Public Health Association, which aired on television stations across Canada. During this era, he was also meeting regularly with Callwood in preparation for the book Jim: A Life with AIDS, which was published in fall 1988. By this time, he had developed Kaposi's sarcoma. In both 1988 and 1989, he invited the media to cover his birthday party as a news story, to highlight his continued survival and to promote further awareness of the disease. At the time of his 1989 party, however, he was making plans to move into Casey House, Toronto's AIDS hospice, due to his declining health.

He died on March 24, 1990, at Casey House, just a few weeks short of his 36th birthday.
