= No Sad Songs =

- Directed by: Nik Sheehan
- Starring: Jim Black; Catherine Hunt; Jim St. James; David Sereda
- Cinematography: Paul Mitchnick
- Music by: Allen Booth; David Woodhead
- Production companies: AIDS Committee of Toronto; Cell Productions
- Release date: September 1985 (TIFF)
- Running time: 63 minutes
- Country: Canada
- Language: English

No Sad Songs is a Canadian documentary film, directed by Nik Sheehan and released in 1985. Billed as the first documentary film about the HIV/AIDS crisis, the film explored the LGBT community's early response to the issue particularly but not exclusively through the personal testimony of Jim Black, a man with AIDS who died several months after the film's release, and Catherine Hunt, the sister of another person with AIDS.

Several other community figures, including musician David Sereda and HIV/AIDS activist Jim St. James, also appear in smaller capacities in the film.

The film was produced by Cell Productions in conjunction with the AIDS Committee of Toronto. Through much of the film and in the original promotional poster, Black wore a "Choose Life" T-shirt by artist Katharine Hamnett; however, during the time between the film's production and its release, Christian evangelist Ken Campbell had registered "Choose Life Canada" as the name of an anti-abortion lobby group, and the AIDS Committee faced controversy when it chose to withdraw the posters rather than risk having them misconstrued as an endorsement of Campbell.
