= Family Secrets (2003 TV series) =

Family Secrets is a television documentary series which premiered in February 2003, created and produced by Maureen Judge.

The 30 minute episodes featured raw, compelling and honest accounts of the impact of secrets on families and their lives. The show used a mix of fly-on-the-wall style observational scenes, informal interviews, home movies, and other material. Each episode features a different family, taking viewers on an intensely personal, humorously nervous and emotionally moving journey into the private world of family relationships.

The series aired on W Network.
