= John Geiger (author) =

American-born Canadian author

John Grigsby Geiger CM is a Canadian journalist, author and shipwreck hunter. He is best known for his book The Third Man Factor: Surviving the Impossible, which popularized the concept of the "third man", an incorporeal being that aids people under extreme duress. The book is the basis for a National Geographic Channel video entitled Explorer: The Angel Effect, in which Geiger appears. In turn, a second book on the topic, based on, and taking its name from the National Geographic video, was published in 2013. His other works include the international bestseller Frozen in Time: The Fate of the Franklin Expedition.

In 2024, Geiger led a Royal Canadian Geographical Society expedition that located Ernest Shackleton's last ship, Quest (ship). Geiger was appointed chief executive officer of the Royal Canadian Geographical Society in 2013.

Geiger was born in Ithaca, New York, in the United States, but grew up in Edmonton, Alberta in Canada, studying history at the University of Alberta.

Geiger was made a member of the Order of Canada in 2020.

== Career ==
Geiger was the editorial board editor for The Globe and Mail, and a senior fellow at Massey College. He has held senior positions at the Royal Canadian Geographical Society for more than two decades, starting when he joined the Society's Board of Governors in 2002. He was elected as its 13th President in 2010, and served until 2013, when he was appointed to the joint role of chief executive officer of both the Society and Canadian Geographical Enterprises, which publishes the Society's bimonthly magazine.

In September 2014, John Geiger was a participant in the Victoria Strait Expedition that searched for Sir John Franklin's ships HMS Erebus and HMS Terror. HMS Erebus was successfully located, though Geiger himself was not among the search crew who found it.

== Books ==
In 1987, Bloomsbury Publishing released Frozen In Time: The Fate of The Franklin Expedition, written by Owen Beattie and John Geiger, with a revised edition in 2004 that featured an introduction by Margaret Atwood. The book has been published in seven countries and became a bestseller in the United Kingdom, and subsequently in Canada and Germany. Geiger spent three field seasons in the Arctic as historical investigator for the Knight Archeological Project, a scientific investigation of the 1719 James Knight Expedition disaster, research published as Dead Silence in 1993. Geiger's book Chapel of Extreme Experience: A Short History of Stroboscopic Light and the Dream Machine (2003) was made into an award-winning film FLicKeR, by director Nik Sheehan. It contains a foreword by the writer and socialite Leila Hadley. Nothing Is True Everything Is Permitted: The Life of Brion Gysin was published in 2005.

In 2008, Geiger authored, with Peter Suedfeld, the scholarly study, ‘The Sensed Presence as a Coping Resource in Extreme Environments.’ In 2009, The Third Man Factor: Surviving the Impossible was published in 13 countries. The foreword was written by Vincent Lam. The book is about the third man factor where people at the very edge of death, often adventurers or explorers, experience a sense of an incorporeal being—a "third man"—beside them who encourages them to make one final effort to survive. The experience, which resembles a guardian angel, has been reported by scores of people, including well-known figures like Sir Ernest Shackleton, Joshua Slocum, Frank Smythe, Charles Lindbergh, Reinhold Messner, Ann Bancroft, and Stephanie Schwabe.
