= Nik Sheehan =

Canadian filmmaker and writer

- Born: 17 March 1960 (age 66); London, England
- Occupation: Director

Nik Sheehan (born 17 March 1960) is a Canadian documentary filmmaker, who established an international reputation with No Sad Songs (1985), the first major documentary on AIDS. The film cited by world-renowned specialist Dr. Balfour Mount as "the best film on the planet this year".

In 1995, he produced and directed Symposium, inspired by Plato’s classic and featuring multiple views of gay love as performed by Canadian artists and writers including Brad Fraser, Stan Persky, Patricia Rozema, Tomson Highway, Daniel MacIvor and others. Premiering at the Montreal World Film Festival, it was broadcast extensively by the CBC, and created national headlines.

God’s Fool (1997), shot in Morocco, tells the story of Scott Symons, a renegade writer of the Canadian establishment who had exiled himself to the seaside town of Essaouira. It premiered at the Toronto International Festival of Authors, where artistic director Greg Gatenby judged it "the best film biography of a writer I have ever seen". God’s Fool was broadcast nationally in primetime on Bravo TV. In 2002, the film opened "Freedom to Read Week" on the BookTelevision digital channel, where it remains in the rotation. Following Symons' death in February 2009, Sheehan wrote and published an obituary in Xtra!

FLicKeR (2008), written and directed by Sheehan, is based on the book Chapel of Extreme Experience by John G. Geiger about the work of artist Brion Gysin and his Dreamachine. The film features interviews with Marianne Faithfull, DJ Spooky, Iggy Pop, Lee Ranaldo, Genesis P-Orridge, John Giorno, Floria Sigismondi, and Kenneth Anger. FLicKeR premiered in Toronto in 2008 at the international documentary film festival Hot Docs and received the festival's Special Jury Prize for the best Canadian Feature Length Documentary. It then went on to win in the Best Film on International Art category at the 2009 Era New Horizons Film Festival in Poland, and was also nominated for a 2009 Gemini Award in the category of Best Performing Arts Program or Series or Arts Documentary Program or Series, and best original score by composer Edmund Eagan. Sheehan was also nominated for a Canadian screenwriting award by the Writers Guild of Canada.

His essay on the Toronto art group General Idea in the collection Queers Were Here (Biblioasis 2016) was acclaimed in the Literary Review of Canada.

In 2017, he made a series of video shorts documenting LGBTQ creators for national Xtra!

After moving from Toronto to Vancouver in 2013, Sheehan produced, co-wrote and directed (with Albert Nerenberg), the climate change documentary feature Who Farted? for documentary Channel (CBC). It was broadcast June 2020 and began streaming on CBC GEM starting September 2020 in Canada. World distribution rights were sold to Syndicado.

Sheehan has worked as a literary critic, essayist, and biographer, publishing in Montage, POV, the National Post, Now, Toronto Life, Quill & Quire, Masthead and fab.

== Films (selection) ==
- No Sad Songs (1985)
- Symposium: Ladder of Love (1995)
- God's Fool (1997)
- The Drawing Master (2004)
- FLicKeR (2008)
- Who Farted? (film) (2019)

== Awards (selection) ==
- 2008 Hot Docs, Special Jury Prize – Best Canadian Feature Documentary (FLicKeR)
- 2009 Era New Horizons Film Festival (Wroclaw, Poland) – Best Film in the International Films on Art Competition (FLicKeR)
