= Family secret =

Secret kept within a family

A family secret can be defined as "events or information that members hide from each other or those outside the family." Family secrets can be shared by the whole family, by some family members or kept by an individual member of the family. Anecdotally, family secrets may be accepted as a form of preventing others from experiencing unnecessary pain or even maintain a family's reputation. The effects of keeping a family secret can have positive or negative impacts on individuals involved, although it has remained a subject of much debate.

Despite the negative implications and associations of holding a family secret, many believe the act is beneficial and even a necessary function of maintaining familial and interpersonal relationships. The act of with-holding or differentially sharing information is also linked to the setting of boundaries and alliances which underscore the structures of relational systems.

Family members often see keeping the secrets as important to keeping the family working, but over time the secrets can increase the anxiety in the family. The confidentiality of family secrets revealed by a patient is a common ethical dilemma for counsellors and therapists.

== Forms and functions of secrecy ==
According to the early work of Karpel, a typology of secrets emerges through the boundaries created in keeping and sharing family secrets. There are three major types of secrets under the classification:

1. Individual Secrets: A type of secret that surfaces in occurrences where one person keeps a secret from another person or persons in the family. Some examples of these types of secrets may include a secret affair of one spouse that is kept from the other or even a daughter's struggle with substance abuse or addiction that is kept from a parent. These secrets create sub-groups within the family.
2. Internal Family Secrets: A type of secret that involve cases where at least two people know of and keep a secret from at least one other person. For example, concealing a family member's true cause of death or long-standing grudges or conflicts between family members. These types of secrets strengthen boundaries that separate the family from the outside world.
3. Shared Family Secrets: A type of secret in which all members of the family are aware of the secret but keep it from people outside of the family. An example of this may be a parent's alcoholism or the birth of an illegitimate child to a daughter. These forms of secrets tend to emphasise and strengthen separation between the family as a unit and the outside world.

=== Communication privacy management ===
The concealment of family secrets is partially explained through the communication privacy management theory. The theory argues that people like to conceal information in order to avoid feeling vulnerable and maintain control over their personal information. In a familial settings, managing private information is much more challenging as some members can reveal more than is desired to those considered "outsiders".

The primary reason individuals tend to keep family secrets is protection, linked to associated feelings of vulnerability when disclosing private information. Individuals may aim to protect themselves, their relationships with other family members and even other people.

== Common secrets ==
Familial secrets tend to be concerned with facts as opposed to feelings or thoughts as encompassed under "real happenings or incidents." These secrets can be further categorised into; taboo topics, rule violations and conventional secrets.

Taboo topics are often recognised as secrets on topics that have been stigmatised by society (e.g. addiction, affairs, sexual preference and even divorce). These secrets will often result in negative consequences to a more severe degree than other types of secrets if they are shared.

Rule violations are recognised as situations in which individuals break familial rules (e.g. breaking curfews, partying or even engaging in reckless driving).

Conventional secrets are categorised as secrets that are considered uncomfortable or inappropriate given certain circumstances (e.g. sex, religion, dating or even grades).

More complex family secrets may involve issues such as homosexuality, adultery, infidelity, divorce, mental illness; crime such as rape or murder; physical or psychological abuse, child sexual abuse, incest; sexual violence such as marital rape or pregnancy from rape; human sexual behavior like premarital pregnancy or teenage pregnancy; substance abuse including alcoholism.

More simple secrets may be personality conflicts, death, religion, academic performance and physical health problems. Any topic that a family member thinks may cause anxiety may become a family secret.

== Psychological theories on secrecy ==
Various psychological theories have emerged in order to understand the decision-making processes that occur in keeping a secret and their consequences on the individuals involved.

=== The Fever Model ===
The model suggest that secret keeping tends to encourage psychological distress that becomes cathartic for the secret-keeper when the information has been disclosed. Individuals may feel cathartic upon sharing but can later come to regret sharing given the context or individual shared to. This may be true in cases where one parent reveals a negative secret about the other parent that may be considered inappropriate for a child to hear.

=== The Preoccupation Model of Secrecy ===
This model suggests keeping a secret from someone close, such as a family member, cognitive effort must be actively and deliberately exerted in order to avoid accidentally disclosing it. Suppressing a secret may result in an obsession towards the secret.

1. Secrecy leads to thought suppression
2. Thought suppression causes intrusive thinking
3. Intrusive thinking promotes further suppression

This creates a cyclical cycle once set in motion.

It may be felt to a greater degree when keeping a secret from a family member, especially when in close proximity as greater cognitive effort must be expended on thought suppression. The intrusive thinking will wear on an individual's well-being as a result

== Effects ==
Family secrets can affect the relationships within a family as familial relationships are shaped party by the information that is shared and what is held secret by members. Families who are more secretive with each other, carefully guard information about their beliefs or financial states, are likely to encourage different relationships among members who openly discuss these matters with those outside of the family.

Family secrets may also encourage positive effects within families. By concealing certain information, individuals are able to maintain their existing relationships with family members and in some cases even strengthen them by maintaining kinship ties through the telling of secrets within the family.
