= Leslie A. Baxter =

American communication scholar

Dr. Leslie A. Baxter is an American scholar and teacher in communication studies, best known for her research on family and relational communication. Her work is focused on relationships: romantic, marital, and friendly. She is best known for her Relational Dialectics theory. She is a professor emeritus at The University of Iowa's department of Communication Studies.

== Background ==
Baxter stayed in Portland during her college years and attended Lewis & Clark College, where she studied communications. She received a bachelor's degree in 1971 and continued her studies with Speech-Communication at the University of Oregon, where she received her master's degree in 1972. In 1975, Baxter received a Ph.D. from the University of Oregon in Speech-Communication.

Baxter started her work as a professor at the University of Montana and served her time there from 1975 to 1976. From 1976 to 1989, she was a faculty member in the Communications Department at Lewis & Clark College, where she had received her undergraduate degree. During the last two years at Lewis & Clark, she was the Associate Provost. Baxter then moved to California where, from 1989 to 1994, she taught in the Rhetoric and Communication Department as well as the Human Development Graduate Group at the University of California-Davis. In 1994, she moved to Iowa where she started her career as a Communication Studies professor at the University of Iowa. From 2000 to 2010, she was the F. Wendell Miller Professor, where she held the maximum period of professorship. In 2004, Baxter was the secondary appointment in the College of Public Health, Department of Community & Behavioral Health at the University of Iowa. In 2012, she became a Collegiate Fellow in the College of Liberal Arts and Sciences.

== Scholarly work ==
Baxter's work focuses on researching family and relational communication. Relational Dialectics Theory, which was created by Baxter and Barbara Montgomery, has been mentioned in books and scholarly journals and received awards. Relational Dialectics Theory is recognizing that all communication is the interplay of differences.

In one of her published articles, "Problematizing the Problem in Communication: A Dialogic Perspective," Baxter discusses the problems within dialogue. She compares her thoughts on dialogue to Mikhail Bakhtin’s dialogism. She also compares her ideas with relational dialectics with an interview conducted by Em Griffin, an author of A First Look at Communication Theory. She believes that differences in relationships are what give it a wholeness, where as Bakhtin’s reference to dialogue isn’t used in "the sense of a happy, pleasant experience".

For Baxter's study on family communication, "Topic Expansiveness and Family Communication Patterns" discovers individual's binary decision in engaging disclosure or avoidance within communication. The study used 122 parents and their children to find communication patterns of avoidance, like sexual issues and topics of drinking/drugs, money, and educational progress. The topics were relative to friendships and everyday activities that would change the dialogue. The four topics of adolescent dating, family relationship rules, family relationship concerns, and traditions were the final grouped topics. "Parental Rule Socialization for Preventive Health and Adolescent Rule Compliance" looked into family rules rather than their communication pattern. Rules like nutrition, exercise, and sun protection in 164 families were examined. The outcome of this study showed that parents reported higher rule articulation than their children within the three topics. In 2014, another study was published about family communication. The study "Discursive Constructions of the Meaning of "Family" in Online Narratives of Foster Adoptive Parents" examined normativity of families, seeing if shared genetics established as a legitimate family. The study showed that it was the importance of dialogue of families that defined a "family", rather than how the family is constructed.

== See also ==
- Relational dialectics
