= Relational dialectics =

Interpersonal communication theory

Relational dialectics is an interpersonal communication theory about close personal ties and relationships that highlights the tensions, struggles, and interplay between contrary tendencies. The theory, proposed by Leslie Baxter and Barbara Montgomery in 1988, defines communication patterns between relationship partners as the result of endemic dialectical tensions. Dialectics are described as the tensions an individual feels when experiencing paradoxical desires that we need and/ or want.

The theory contains four assumptions: relationships are not unidimensional; change is a key element in life; tension is everlasting; communication is essential to work through conflicted feelings. Relational communication theories allow for opposing views or forces to come together in a reasonable way. When making decisions, desires and viewpoints that often contradict one another are mentioned and lead to dialectical tensions. Leslie A. Baxter and Barbara M. Montgomery exemplify these contradictory statements that arise from individuals experience dialectal tensions using common proverbs such as "opposites attract", but "birds of a feather flock together"; as well as, "two's company; three's a crowd" but "the more the merrier". This does not mean these opposing tensions are fundamentally troublesome for the relationship; on the contrary, they simply bring forward a discussion of the connection between two parties.

The relational dialectic is an elaboration on Mikhail Bakhtin's idea that life is an open monologue and humans experience collisions between opposing desires and needs within relational communications. Baxter includes a list of dialectical tensions that reminds us that relationships are constantly changing, and that successful and satisfying relationships require constant attention. Although Baxter's description of relational dialectics is thorough, it is not exact or all-inclusive since we all experience different tensions in different ways.

== History ==
Yin and yang

Relational dialectics is the emotional and value-based version of the philosophical dialectic. It is rooted in the dynamism of the yin and yang. Like the classic yin and yang, the balance of emotional values in a relationship is constantly in motion, and any value pushed to its extreme, contains the seed of its opposite.

In the Western world, the ideas of yin and yang link back to the Greek philosopher Heraclitus, who argued that the world was in constant flux (like fire), with creative and destructive forces on both sides of every process. Mikhail Bakhtin, a Russian scholar most known for his work in dialogism, applied Marxist dialectic to literary and rhetorical theory and criticism. He illustrated the tensions that exists in the deep structure of all human experience. For example, he identified that the tension that exists between unity and difference. Bakhtin conceived the human dialectic as two forces analogous to the physical forces centripetal (emotional forces tending towards unity) and centrifugal (emotional forces tending towards divergence). Like the Yin and Yang, Bakhtin's forces have no ultimate resolution.

Baxter took the deep structural analysis of Bakhtin and applied it to communication theory. She found a set of axes where this dynamic tension operated. Later authors have added other axes.

== Concepts ==
There are three main approaches to relational dialectics: monologic, dualistic and dialectic.

The first approach, monologic approach, frames contradictions as either/or, demonstrating that the contradictions are mutually exclusive or opposite of each other. For example, an individual can either like hot or cold weather. They may not like not a mix of weather conditions. Monologic approach means as we move closer to one concept, we move further away from the other.

The second approach, dualistic approach, frames contradictions as two separate entities, showing that they are unrelated in nature. When studying a relationship and one individual in the relationship is evaluated exclusive of their interaction with their partner, then this is an example of the dualistic approach.

The third approach, the dialectic approach, contends that multiple points of view play off one another in every contradiction (both/and). When two people are in a relationship, one can desire to be open in the relationship exposing certain parts of their life with the other person. At the same time, that individual can also have a sense of self-protection where they may not want to share everything about them with their partner. Both of these feelings can exist within the individual at the same time.

There are four main concepts that form the backdrop of relational dialectics, as well as four major assumptions. Relational dialectics assumes that "(1.) relationships are not linear, (2.) relational life is characterized by change, (3.) contradiction is the fundamental fact of relational life, and (4.) communication is central to organizing and negotiating relational contradictions".

The four core concepts of relational dialectics include: contradiction, totality, process, and praxis.

Contradictions are the core concept of relational dialectics. It is the dynamic interplay between unified oppositions. A contradiction is formed "whenever two tendencies or forces are interdependent (unity) yet mutually negate one another (negation)". For example, in a relationship one can simultaneously desire intimacy and distance.

Totality suggests that contradictions in a relationship are part of a unified whole and cannot be understood in isolation. In other words, the dialectics cannot be separated and are intrinsically related to each other. For example, the tension between dependence and interdependence cannot be separated from the tension between openness and privacy — both work to condition and define the other.

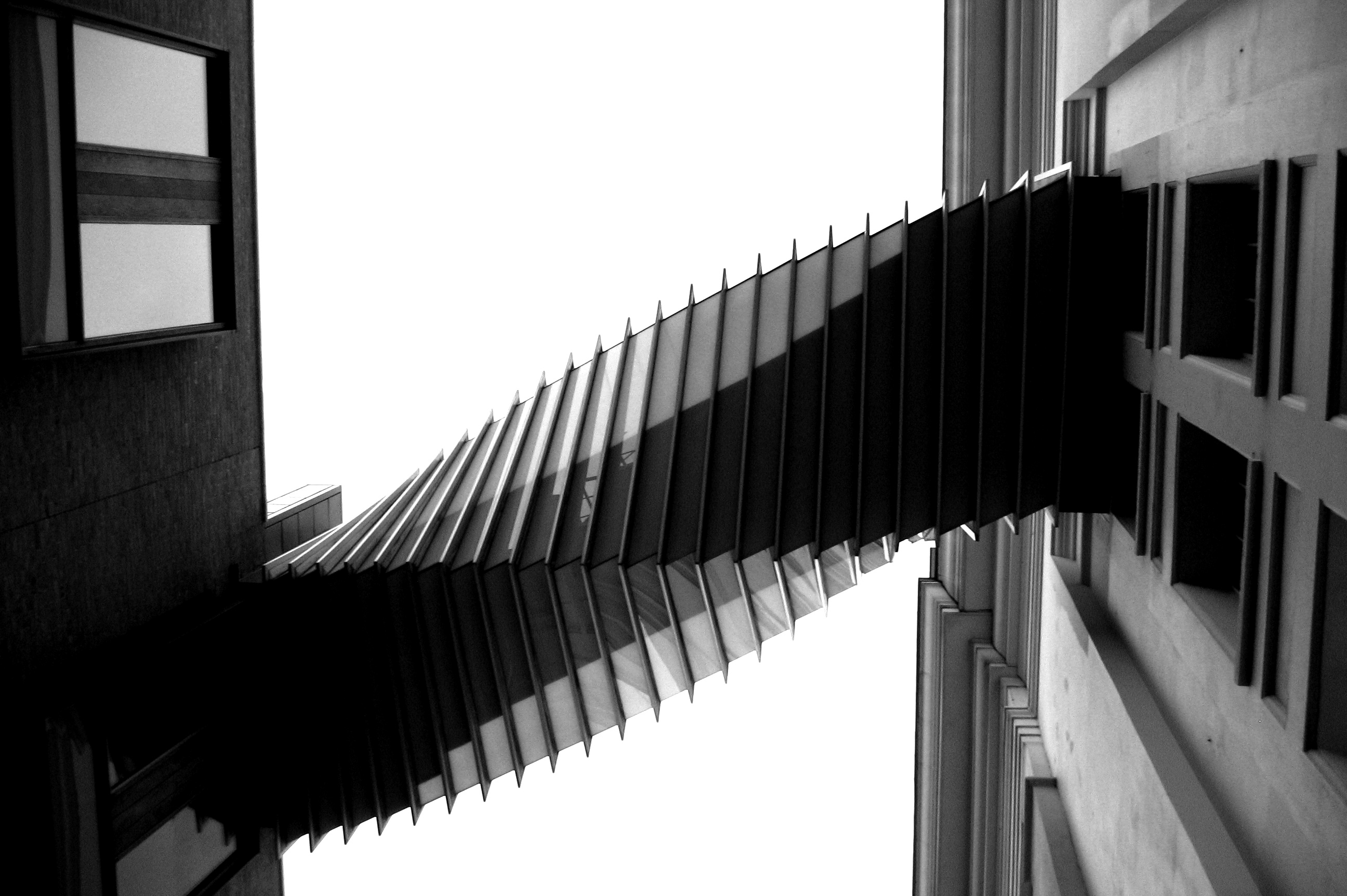
Opposites

Process Relational dialectics must be understood in terms of social processes. Movement, activity, and change are functional properties (Rawlins,1989). For example, instances such as an individual fluctuating between disclosure and secretiveness. In addition, the individual may move between periods of honest and open communication (Miller, 2002, 2005).

Praxis is a philosophical term for the concept of 'practical behavior' or sometimes 'the experience of practicing'. In praxis, the dialectic tensions are created and re-created through the active participation and interaction. In other words, the practical experience of having a relationship exposes one to the imposition of the needs and values of another. As the relationship endures, one's own needs and values become apparent. Praxis focuses on the practical choices individuals make in the midst of the opposing needs and values (dialectical tensions). In turn, the choices and actions themselves create, re-create, and change the nature of the relationship and hence the dialectical tensions themselves.

Research has recommended theories which further dialectical understanding in relationships, such as in marriage, in the workplace, etc. Relational dialectics further includes the idea of Contextual Dialectics, or rather, the idea that every relationship exists within a specific place within a specific culture. From there we also see the raise of public and private/real and ideal dialectics and the interplay between what is seen on television in public life, versus what is experienced in private lives. Examples of this concept include the viewing of politicians as well as what is viewed on television shows. According to West and Turner, "the tension of the real and ideal dialectic is featured when we think of television shows like Leave It to Beaver: We receive an idealized message of what family life is like, and then when we look at the families we live in, we have to contend with the troublesome realities of family life. The tension between these two images forms this dialectic".

According to the original relational dialectic model, there were many core tensions (opposing values) in any relationship. These are autonomy and connectedness, favoritism and impartiality, openness and closedness, novelty and predictability, instrumentality and affection, and finally, equality and inequality.

Autonomy and connectedness refers to the desire to have ties and connections with others versus the need to separate oneself as a unique individual. An example of autonomy and connectedness would be an athlete who wants to feel like he/she is a part of a team but also wanting to highlight his/her individual talents. Favoritism and impartiality refers to the desire to be treated fairly and impartially versus the desire to be seen and known as "special". For instance, a professor may want to be impartial by creating an attendance policy but makes exceptions for students who participate in class and have good grades, demonstrating favoritism. Openness and closedness refers to the desire to be open and divulge information versus the desire to be exclusive and private. When chatting with a boss about one's weekend, there is the desire to be open, however, closedness is also at play, as certain details are often left out, because of the context. Novelty and predictability suggest that there is a desire for the relationship to be predictable versus the desire for it to be original and new. When creating scheduled meetings for board members, the predictability may lie in a fixed schedule, however the novelty may be in scheduling a varying number of locations to peak interests as well as inspiration. Instrumentality and affection, is the desire for affection to be genuine versus the desire for affection to be motivated by benefits and perceived advantages of the relationship. An example of this would be being in a romantic relationship based on love and affection, but maintaining it for benefits such as financial security. Finally, equality and inequality refers to the desire to be considered as equals versus the desire to develop levels of superiority. A female in the military may seek treatment equivalent to that received by her male colleagues, but requires special barracks and adjusted assignments.

According to the theory, while most of us may embrace the ideals of closeness, certainty, and openness in our relationships, the communication is not a straight path towards these goals. Conflicts often produce the exact opposites.

	Internal dialect (within the relationship)	External dialect (between couple and community)
Integration–Separation	Connection–Autonomy	Inclusion–Seclusion
Stability–Change	Certainty–Uncertainty	Conventionality–Uniqueness
Expression–Nonexpression	Openness–Closedness	Revelation–Concealment

The table above shows typical dialectical tensions experienced by relational partners based on research done by Baxter and Montgomery showing contrasting efforts in two different ways. The column that displays examples of Internal Dialect shows "ongoing tensions played out within a relationship". The column that displays examples of External Dialect shows "ongoing tensions between a couple and their community".

Integration–separation is "a class of relational dialectics that includes connection–autonomy, inclusion–seclusion, and intimacy–independence." Some individual autonomy must be given up to connect to others.

Stability–change is "a class of relational dialectics that includes certainty–uncertainty, conventionally–uniqueness, predictability–surprise, and routine–novelty." Things must be consistent but not mundane. There must be a balance between the expected and unexpected in order to keep a relationship.

Expression–nonexpression is "a class of relational dialectics that includes openness–closedness, revelation–concealment, candor–secrecy, and transparency–privacy". In a relationship, it is important to keep some things between the two parties, while other parts of the relationship are okay to allow the public to know about.

According to Michaela Meyer, "relational dialectics theory exposes tensions within interpersonal relationships while at the same time it assumes a continual maintenance and repair of these tensions. As a result, relational dialectics theory is incredibly useful for defining how tensions are managed within relationships." Extensive research has been done regarding the role dialectical tensions play in relationships, as well as the various factors that influence the tensions and the degree to which they affect the relationship. Through studies of romantic relationships, long-distance relationships, friendships, and family relationships, researchers have observed the existence and frequency of certain dialectical tensions within various types of relationships.

According to Marsha Linehan, founder of DBT or Dialectical Behavior Therapy, some people have great difficulty resolving the dialectic tensions that arise in relationships. Many people with personality disorders, potentially caused or made worse by dysfunctional upbringing, especially Borderline Personality Disorder (BPD) and some others, perpetually vascilate between the poles of the dialectic conflict, with resulting instability causing problems in living that are not mediated by other therapy modalities. In DBT's biosocial theory, some people "have a biological predisposition for emotional dysregulation, and their social environment validates maladaptive behavior.

Erbert 2000 studied 25 heterosexual married couples to determine what types of dialectical tensions were most prevalent in antagonistic conflicts between spouses. Larry Erbert found that the Openness v. Closedness dialectic was most commonly referenced through examples by participants. Research conducted by Baxter and Montgomery confirmed this finding, and broke the dialectic down into four subcategories to further analyze its existence in romantic relationships.

- Openness with: Refers to an individual's self-disclosure of information to another. In this idea, three types of information are shared: information deemed to be personal, the individuals feelings or personal opinions, and information regarding one individual's relationship with the other.
- Openness To: Often this form of openness is labeled as being attentive or responsive. People respond in cognitive, affective, and behavioral ways.
- Closedness with: Describes the type of nondisclosive talk that occurs between individuals. It is most often identified as "small talk", being primarily superficial. The talk is oriented around conversation that requires little or no self-disclosure, allowing for a controlled level informational privacy.
- Closedness to: Some people experience stress and discomfort when listening to others' problems. In response to this, some individuals attempt to distance themselves in order to discourage others from confiding in them.

Research has been conducted to examine the autonomy-connection dialectic when dealing with termination of romantic relationships. In Erin Sahlestein and Tim Dun's study they found that, "participants' joint conversations and their breakup accounts reflect the two basic forms of contradiction. Both antagonistic and non-antagonistic struggles were evident in these data". Furthermore, the study discovered that while normally break-ups are retroactively studied, the autonomy-connection dialectic is actually in full swing throughout the termination process as opposed to previous thought of as a move from connection to autonomy.

Suter & Daas 2007, measuring the display of symbols by lesbian couples, revealed that while same-sex couples experience similar challenges that opposite-sex partners experience, there are unique challenges that arise to these same-sex couples. These unique problems in turn give rise to unique dialectical tensions within the relationship.

Wilder 2012 identified six tensions unique to remarriages.

Three tensions related to the remarried dyad:

- Old-new - Many participants found that within their new marriage, the individuals brought with them ideas and expectations based on their previous, or "old," marriages. However, participants recognized that they had since entered a "new" marriage, which would not necessarily carry over the previous old expectations or experiences.
- Emotional closeness-distance - Participants expressed feelings of both emotional closeness and emotional distance with their new partners. While participants found that they experienced emotional closeness with their second spouse, they also found that either they or their new spouse had other close friends or family with whom they were close.
- Past-present - Many participants found that they do not discuss prior relationships, or other things that relate to the past, with their new partners. Yet, the new couples remained open about issues and topics related to their present life.

Three tensions also emerged from the remarried dyad and their social networks:

- Their time frame-our time frame - Many participants expressed feeling tensions between adhering to a time frame that felt right to the individual, while acknowledging the expectations that they sensed from their friends and family members in regards to what an appropriate relationship and remarriage time frame would be.
- Dyadic revelation-network revelation - Participants found that they desired to share information with their social network, however, sometimes their partner did not desire them to share such information with that particular network, resulting in tensions among participants trying to decide between revealing to their partner and revealing information to their social network.
- Old-new - Participants identified the tension that was created through interactions with friends and family from the "old" marriage while being in the "new" marriage. Participants managed this tension primarily through recalibration and reaffirmation, where participants recognized that both sides had to be present in order for the relationship to exist.

Based on research by Sahlstein, the uncertainty v. certainty dialectic is the most prevailing dialectic found in long-distance relationships. Her work exposed uncertainty v. certainty as a competing yet complementary need. In interviews conducted with couples engaged in long-distance relationships, contradictions emerged. For example, couples were found to plan interactions in order to obtain a level of spontaneity. Within this, three different forms of the praxis of relational dialectics emerged:

- Segmentation - referred to the partners' ability to live separate, independent lives when they were not together.
- Balance - referred to the couple's ability to plan conversations about the future of the relationship.
- Denial - referring to the couple's refusal to admit the effect that distance is having on the relationship.

William Rawlins has examined the role of relational dialectics in regard to friendships. The tension of instrumentality v. affection was found to be the most central to this type of relationship. Within friendships, importance is placed on the ability to discern the level of affection for "real" friendships opposed to instrumentality for "fake" friendships. Aristotle's "friendship of virtue" notion of caring for friends without instrumental purposes exemplifies this point. The dichotomy of instrumentality v. affection cannot be ignored within friendships, as affection may be offered in order to receive instrumental aid from friends. This interweaving of concepts is what distinguishes different types of friendships. While this remains true, the subjectivity of the friends in question ultimately determines the outcome of how heavily instrumentality v. affection is applied.

In the workplace

Blended Relationships are close friends that are a part of the same work environment. Dialectical tensions occur in organizations as individuals attempt to balance their roles as employees while maintaining established friendships within their occupations. It is not necessary, however, to have a friend in organizations to experience dialectical contradictions. Stress occurs frequently on the individual level as human needs and desires oppose.

- Impartiality vs. Favoritism: Friends within organizations desire to provide each other with special support and assistance but organizations strive for equitable treatment and discourage bias.
- Openness vs. Closedness: It is a tendency of close friends to be open and honest with one another, but organizations often expect a level of confidentiality that places strain on friendships that value the sharing of information.
- Novelty and Predictability: Feeling excited about a restructuring of your organization but anxious since it may interrupt your routine and put stress on your current relationships.
- Instrumentality and Affection: Inviting a coworker to lunch with the intention of asking for support on a project at work.

Sibling relationships

Relational dialectics can be applied when considering the significant change in family life that siblings experience when one sibling moves out of the family home for the first time as part of the transition into adulthood. As one sibling begins a new phase of life, this change is often accompanied by new friendships or romantic relationships that occur in his/her new lifestyle, along with a new geographic separation, both of which result in a change in communication. As the newly absent sibling begins a new lifestyle beyond his/her home, the pre-existing sibling relationship goes through various changes and transitions.

In a study conducted on discursive struggles among siblings experiencing transition, all participants acknowledged that moving away from their sibling(s) resulted in a discursive struggle between the old and new meanings in the sibling relationship. Two specific discursive struggles were identified:

- Old relationship-new relationship - For many siblings, family rituals were not continued upon moving out, resulting in a change in the relationship and a feeling of missing out, emphasizing the changes that occur during the transition from an old relationship into new ones.
- Certainty-uncertainty - Participants found that the change from seeing a sibling regularly to not seeing him/her often resulted in feelings of uncertainty, resulting in an identity shift in the relationship and supporting the discursive struggle of certainty-uncertainty.

While participants addressed the varying tensions involved with lifestyle transitions, 8 of the 19 participants in the study expressed that moving away from their sibling strengthened their connection and appreciation for their brother(s) and/or sister(s).

Children and Parents

In a journal published by the Bulacan Agricultural State College, it is said that both kids and their parents display back-and-forth communication and rely on one each other. They feel different emotions because they also have varying intensities regarding their commitment. Another aspect is their desires. Children want to decrease the amount of control their parents exert over them but also have autonomy. However, there can be struggles. This is where different strategies are put into play. Constructive ones are used to help the relationship have an equilibrium, whereas destructive ones are the antithesis. Active strategies are more upfront and want to fix a problem, as they fall under the category of constructive strategies. On the other hand, there are passive strategies. All of these are classified as being, an array of patterns. One of them is active destructive. They can be negative or helpful.

These strategies are more indirect and imply an individual does not want to face a problem. The most utilized methods, as said by Marcelo, are passive strategies.

Children and stepparents

In a study focusing on the adult stepchild perceptions of communication in the stepchild-stepparent relationship, three contradictions were found to be experienced by the stepchildren participants:

- Dialectics of emotional distance-closeness - While many stepchildren expressed feelings of emotional distance, the participants had varying reasons for keeping the distance. Some participants who still had a positive relationship with their nonresidential parent kept an emotional distance from their stepparent as an act of loyalty that they felt toward their nonresidential parent. Other participants equated emotional distance to the fact that they had little in common with their stepparent. However, many participants expressed feeling some closeness with a stepparent while maintaining an amount of emotional distance. Participants reported that they upheld a relationship with the stepparent that contained honesty, respect, and trust, yet they kept an emotional distance by continuing to address the stepparent by his/her first name, or simply claiming that each individual was very different from the other, causing tension in an effort to promote emotional closeness.
- Stepparent status - Many of the stepchildren in the study also experienced a dialectical tension between desiring for the family authority position to be designated to their one residential parent along with a desire for both the residential parent and the stepparent to share parenting authority. Many participants felt that legitimating their stepparent as a parent would result in the formation of closeness.
- Expression - The participants expressed a desire for open communication with their stepparent, while at the same time, expressing resistance to openness and instead favoring a more careful form of communication due to the fact that the participants often sensed a lack of familiarity with their stepparent.

In another study, researchers aimed to identify the contradictions that were perceived by stepchildren when characterizing the ways that familial interactions caused them to feel caught in the middle between parents. The participants expressed that they wanted to be centered in the family while, at the same time, they hoped to avoid being caught in the middle of two opposing parents. The main contradiction identified in the study was similar to the autonomy-connection dialectic: stepchildren desired the freedom to communicate and enact the desired relationship with their parents. However, these stepchildren also felt the need to manage the constraints that resulted from parental communication, particularly when both parents did not cooperate with one another. While the stepchildren wanted to know what was happening, at the same time, they also wanted to be protected, resulting in a second dialectic of control-restraint. Through this study, the researchers believe that openness-closeness dialectic between parents and their children is important to building functional stepfamily relationships.

Braithwaite & Baxter 2006, focussing on the relationship and communication between college-aged stepchildren and their nonresidential parents, found two underlying contradictions: parenting and not parenting, and openness and closeness. Many participants expressed that they wanted their nonresidential parent to be actively involved in parenting them but did not desire it once they were. Participants also expressed that while they wanted open and intimate communication with their nonresidential parents, they felt that they could not closely communicate because of the nonresidential parent's lack of familiarity with the child's everyday life.

== Theory applications ==
Relational dialectics theory can be applied to the context of health care and family. In the health care field, the quality of the end-of-life care is influenced by how these tensions are managed. Relational dialectics theory provides an applicable framework for caregiver communication that contains tensions and challenges.

In a study that focused on the communication tensions perceived among the Maori culture during the end-of-life journey, it was found that despite the culture's focus on collectivism and its emphasis on harmony, four communication tensions existed between caregivers (family and friends) and patients: autonomy and connection, conflict and connection, isolation and connection, and balancing the needs of self and other.

In fact, Relational Dialectics Theory can be broadly used in family communication. The concept of simultaneous centrifugal and centripetal forces to provide a theory of family communication. This perspective recognises that family life is "a both/and experience – families gain their meanings from the give-and-take interplay of multiple, competing themes and perspectives".

When making choices about end-of-life medical care, family members, friends, or surrogate decision makers often experience feelings of tension and burden. Decision-makers must deal with the relational and moral tensions that come with such decision-making. Family members in charge of making end-of-life decisions often face conflicting emotions between holding on and letting go; recognizing the need to let a patient go while wanting to continue fighting to keep a loved one alive.

The human grieving process is marked by relational dialectics. After the death of a child, bereaved parents often experience tension between presence and absence by grieving their child's permanent absence while still experiencing an emotional bond toward the deceased child. Bereaved parents may also experience tension between openness and closeness, where they desire to discuss their feelings with friends or family, yet they are hesitant to share because of the potentially negative reactions they could receive.

One study, aimed at focusing on how families make sense of contradictory discourses, found two discursive contradictions: family members' wishes vs. patient's wishes, and emotionality vs. rationality. Through interviews with participants who had experienced the loss of a loved one, researchers concluded that many of the end of life decisions made by family members, patients, and doctors were centered on making sense of the simultaneous desires to hold on and to let go. Participants recognized that they experienced tension between their own preferences and the preferences of a loved one, and with that, experienced the tension between desiring to make decisions based on emotions versus making decisions based on rationality.

Dialectical contradictions have also been found among parents who have lost a child. One study found that two primary dialectical contradictions occurred for parents who had experienced the death of a child: openness-closeness, and presence-absence. Parents experienced openness-closeness when they desired to talk about their child and their loss, yet they perceived the outcome as risky, especially if they sensed that friends and family wished for the parents to move on. Participants explained that they were able to manage this contradiction by being selective with their disclosure and taking control over the communicative situation. When dealing with the presence-absence dialectic, bereaved parents experienced tensions between the ongoing bond that they experienced with their child, and the physical absence of the child. Participants expressed that when people were not willing to remember their dead child, the physical absence of the child was deeply felt. However, when people chose to remember the deceased child, the parent experienced feelings of comfort and continual bonding with the child.

Correlation to Rejection Sensitivity

Mishra and Allen 2023 mention the rejection sensitivity model containing three elements. They are,"...anxious expectations, perceptions of rejection, and cognitive-affective rejections." Generally, the model concentrates on people who pay more attention to rejection as a threat, including the potential cues leading to the event. Anxious expectations, first, "...develop early in life, and often in response to unpleasant interactions in close relationships." The model also implies those who are overly anxious have the tendency to think that unsuual behavioral cues indicate rejection. There are many examples. One is that individuals can notice that their friends are hanging out without them when it's usually just the two of them. This can signal distance. A person geared in this theory can end up misinterpret the scenario is thinking they have left them, in other words, reject them. This cycle can spark negative feelings. This is where the defence motivation occurs. The motivation's system emotes strong emotions within the individual, causing them to overreact, including the necessity to defend themselves. Here, the individual trying to protect themselves escalates the likelihood of maladaptive outcomes. The theory can strongly correlate to Relational Dialectics.

There are several scenarios where RDT can be applied. For example, two people have feelings toward each other. Nevertheless, one individual begins hanging out with someone of a different gender. They can feel rejection. They are spending time with another person instead of with them. Tension can arise. One person can feel jealous. As a result, they avoid that certain person, while the other notices his actions. These individuals become at odds end. Misconceptions, in this context, can lead to destroyed ties within a relationship. The defense mechanism was the avoidance. Tension occurred within the two people because that person noticed the other's jealousy.

Ghosting

Ghosting is leaving a relationship without an explanation as said by Sage Journals. It can occur in any relationship. Those who do get ghosted are very distraught; they deal with emotional pain, not having clarity, and other negative emotions. There are also those who ghost. They deal with remorse and regret their actions. Within a study citation, it mentions that Powell et al. discovered "...45% of participants reported being ghosted by friends, [another study] revealed half... of [the] participants recalled being ghosted in a friendship rather than a romantic relationship." There are gender revealing within the concept of ghosting. It correlates to their the two genders' behaviors.

The article mentions that "Previous research indicates that men are more likely to adopt detached inhibitory and restrictive communication styles, while women tend to favor nurturing, constructive approaches that emphasize emotional resolution and relational harmony." This means men want to be more emotionally independent. Furthermore, according to this quotation, ghosting does not fully align with women. They value balance. They also want to involve themselves emotionally which is how they can resolve conflicts.

People can ghost for many reasons. One of them is because one partner, in a relationship, might think they are not good for the other. They do not want to go through a break up. It could be because they don't want to hurt them. Another reason can be to escape an abusive relationship; someone might fear for their own safety and ghost their significant other. The reason is to protect themselves physically and emotionally.

Understanding Autistic Communication

As relational dialects' aim is to analyse competence during interaction, it can suggest an approach to researching on communication competence among people with autism spectrum disorders. Applying relational dialects theory to studying interactions of autistic individuals starts from approaching autistic individual as an actor during the interaction and deeming competence a result of the interaction. This approach can delve into how social contexts, expectations, and roles contribute to the autistics' competent communication. The investigation of dialects includes integration-separation, expression-privacy, and stability-change enhance the understanding of the communication between people with autism spectrum disorders.

== Dialogue ==
Dialogue is typically a conversation between two or more people. These conversations are what constitute relationships, as communication is the very foundation of any relationship. According to Cools, "the four important concepts that form the foundation of dialogism 1) the self and the other situated in contradictory forces, 2) unfinalizability, 3) the chronotope and the carnivalesque, and 4) heteroglossia and utterance". Similarity, in dialogue the following components are the most important: constitutive dialogue, utterance chains, dialectical flux, aesthetic moment, and critical sensibility.

'Constitutive dialogue'

While some theorists, along with Baxter, may argue that communication is simply a feature in a relationship, examining constitutive dialogue suggests that communication is actually what creates and maintains a relationship instead. According to Baxter, "a constitutive approach to communication asks how communication defines, or constructs, the social world, including our selves and our personal relationships. From a constitutive perspective, then, persons and relationships are not analytically separable from communication; instead, communication constitutes these phenomena". When initial researchers studied relationships, they found that similarities, backgrounds, and interests are usually what hold people together while self-disclosure is the root of these components. Dialogic researchers would argue that differences are just as important as similarities and they are both discovered through dialogue.

'Utterance chains'

To understand utterance chains, we must know that an utterance is what a person says in one turn of a conversation. When utterances are "linked to competing discourses", they are considered utterance chains. Baxter believes that there are "four links on the chain where the struggle of competing discourses can be heard." These are: cultural ideologies, relational history, non-yet spoken response of partner or utterance, and normative evaluation of third party to utterance. Baxter also suggest that to understand an utterance, we must also understand the discourse. She posits "in the broadest sense, a discourse is a cultural system of meaning that circulates among a group's members and which makes our talk sensical. for example in the United States the discourse of individualism helps us to understand and value an utterance such as, 'I need to find myself first before I commit to a serious relationship with another person'".

'Dialectical flux'

A dialectical flux is "the unpredictable, unfinalizable, indeterminate nature of personal relationships". Relationships are complicated and intertwined with dialectical tensions. Spiraling inversion and segmentation are two strategies that Baxter and Montgomery have established to respond to this complexity. Spiraling inversion is generally a no-win situation; a struggle between two different thought processes. For example, if you were to do something your parents did not approve of, you could lie about it, but your parents might yell at you for lying. And on the other hand, you could tell them upfront, and they could be completely quiet in shock. Segmentation is pertaining to more than one role in a relationship that must be altered depending on the situation. For example, if you were working at your father's shop as a part-time job, he would be considered your father AND your boss. This could mean that he has different expectations of you in different circumstances and his attitude towards you might change between roles.

'Aesthetic moment'

Aesthetic moments are brief incidents in a relationship that bring participants together through the use of dialogue. There is a temporary feeling of wholeness felt between partners involved in this dialogue. It is easy to see examples of aesthetic moments in romantic relationships, such as a first kiss or a reciting of wedding vows, but these moments can be experienced by anyone.

'Critical sensibility'

According to Griffin, critical sensibility is "an obligation to critique dominant voices, especially those that suppress opposing viewpoints; a responsibility to advocate for those who are muted". This means that both sides of a dialogue are equal to one another. No one person is more powerful or dominant than the other, and they are able to communicate without these imbalances interfering. This does not mean that the dialogue is free of competing discourses as listed in Utterance Chains.

== Ethics ==
When communicating, we must understand that morals do not apply for all people. Sometimes lying can be entirely minor in communication, but there are oftentimes that lying can majorly affect the perspective of those being lied to. There are several times where most people would justify a "white lie", or a lie that causes no harm. For instance, if your mother was in the hospital, you could tell her she still looked beautiful, even if her appearance was far from it because it would make her feel better. Other actions that are only followed through based on whether they have a positive or negative outcome are called "consequential ethics". According to Sissela Bok, "lies drag around an initial negative weight that must be factored into ethical equations". Bok believes in the "principle of veracity" which says that truthful statements are preferable to lies in the absence of special circumstances that overcome the negative weight. Ethics plays a major role in the study of interpersonal communication, particularly relational dialectics. In an area where contradictions seem like the norm, it is even more important to share the truth. Incorporating varying and oftentimes opposite view points is critical because communication is grounded in human nature which forces ethics.

== Critiques ==
According to theorist Leslie Baxter, there are three major limitations in the work of relational dialectics theory. Baxter claims that her work has been "too distanced from naturally occurring talk between relating parties", and claims that the theory needs a firmer empirical base when applied to talk between relating parties. Naturally occurring talk between relating parties could be qualitative work utilizing the observation method of relating parties or small groups. Non-participative or participative observation would be appropriate for continued study of relational dialectics theory. Baxter also believes that more future work needs to include multiple voices instead of focusing on the more popular research on the dialectics between "two voices". Baxter posits that relational dialectics, opposite infers binary opposites when "many discourses can be competing at once". Lastly, Baxter shares that future research should focus on discourse through time, such as studying dialogue and how it transforms over a longer period of time. The latter would take significant time so it would be studies that incorporate earlier works compared to more recent work.

== See also ==
- Dialogic
- Mikhail Bakhtin
- Uncertainty reduction theory
- Dialectical behavior therapy

== Sources ==
- Baxter, Leslie A.; Montgomery, Barbara M. (1996). Relating: Dialogues and Dialectics. Guilford Publications. ISBN 978-1-57230-099-6.
- Griffin, Emory A. (2003). A First Look at Communication Theory. McGraw-Hill. ISBN 978-0-07-253934-9.
- Miller, Katherine (2002). Communication Theories: Perspectives, Processes, and Contexts. McGraw-Hill. ISBN 978-0-7674-0500-3.
- West, Richard; Turner, Lynn (2009). Introducing Communication Theory: Analysis and Application. McGraw-Hill Education. ISBN 978-0-07-338507-5.
