= Third man factor =

Comforting presence perceived during stress

The third man factor, third man effect, or third person syndrome refers to reported situations where a perceived unseen presence, such as a spirit, provides comfort or support during a traumatic experience. It is most commonly experienced by mountain climbers. Solo sailors, shipwreck survivors, and polar explorers are also known to have reported the phenomenon.

== History ==
Sir Ernest Shackleton, in his 1919 book South, described his belief that an incorporeal companion joined him and his men during the final leg of his 1914–1917 Antarctic expedition, which became stranded in pack ice for more than two years and endured immense hardships in the attempt to reach safety. Shackleton wrote, "during that long and racking march of thirty-six hours over the unnamed mountains and glaciers of South Georgia, it seemed to me often that we were four, not three." His admission resulted in other survivors of extreme hardship coming forward and sharing similar experiences.

Who is the third who walks always beside you?
When I count, there are only you and I together
But when I look ahead up the white road
There is always another one walking beside you
Gliding wrapt in a brown mantle, hooded
I do not know whether a man or a woman
— But who is that on the other side of you?

— T. S. Eliot,

Lines 359 through 365 of T. S. Eliot's 1922 modernist poem The Waste Land were inspired by Shackleton's experience, as stated by the author in the notes included with the work. It is the reference to "the third" in this poem that has given this phenomenon its name (when it could occur to even a single person in danger).

In recent years, well-known adventurers like climber Reinhold Messner and polar explorers Peter Hillary and Ann Bancroft have reported experiencing the phenomenon. One study of cases involving adventurers reported that the largest group involved climbers, with solo sailors and shipwreck survivors being the second most common group, followed by polar explorers. A similar experience was documented by mountain climber Joe Simpson in his 1988 book Touching the Void, which recounts his near-death experience in the Peruvian Andes. Simpson describes "a voice" which encouraged him and directed him as he crawled back to base camp after suffering a leg injury high on Siula Grande and falling off a cliff and into a crevasse. Some journalists have related this to the concept of a guardian angel or imaginary friend. Scientific explanations consider the phenomenon a coping mechanism or an example of bicameral mentality. The concept was popularized by a 2009 book by John G. Geiger, The Third Man Factor, which documents scores of examples.

Modern psychologists have used the "third man factor" to treat victims of trauma. The "cultivated inner character" lends support and comfort.

== See also ==
- Out-of-body experience

== General and cited references ==
- Alderson-Day, Ben (2023). Presence: The Strange Science of the Unseen Other. Manchester: Manchester University Press. ISBN 978-1-5261-7351-5. JSTOR jj.21996228.
- Blanke, Olaf; Pozeg, Polona; Hara, Masayuki; Heydrich, Lukas; Serino, Andrea; Yamamoto, Akio; Higuchi, Toshiro; Salomon, Roy; Seeck, Margitta; Landis, Theodor; Arzy, Shahar; Herbelin, Bruno; Bleuler, Hannes; Rognini, Giulio (17 November 2014). "Neurological and Robot-Controlled Induction of an Apparition". Current Biology. 24 (22): 2681–2686. Bibcode:2014CBio...24.2681B. doi:10.1016/j.cub.2014.09.049. PMID 25447995. Describes how the third man factor is produced in experiments as "feelings of presence" (FoP) with normal persons.
- [Current, The] (27 January 2009). "The Current for January 27, 2009 - Part 3: Third Man Factor". The Current. CBC Radio. Archived from the original on 5 February 2009.
- Geiger, John (2009). The Third Man Factor. Toronto: Viking Canada. ISBN 978-0-14-301751-6. The book's official website (archived).
- Messner, Reinhold (13 September 2009). "Guardian Angels or the 'Third Man Factor'?". All Things Considered. NPR.
