= Legal Orientalism: China, the United States, and Modern Law =

2013 book by Teemu Ruskola

- Cover
- Author: Teemu Ruskola
- Language: English
- Subject: Law, Legal Orientalism, Asian history, extraterritorial jurisdiction, American history, Oriental despotism, comparative law, international law, and postcolonial studies
- Publisher: Harvard University Press
- Publication date: June 3, 2013
- Pages: 352
- Awards: The Association of American Law Schools Distinguished Book Award in 2017
- ISBN: 978-0-674-07306-7
- OCLC: 842907949
- Dewey Decimal: 349.51
- LC Class: KQK165 .R87 2013

Legal Orientalism: China, the United States, and Modern Law is a 2013 book by Finnish-born legal scholar Teemu Ruskola. The author investigates how Western legal discourses constructed China as a lawless society and how this characterization shaped American law and foreign policy from the nineteenth century onward. Ruskola argues that the concept of "rule of law" developed in opposition to an imagined Oriental despotism, and that this binary framework justified American extraterritorial jurisdiction in China and domestic measures such as the Chinese Exclusion Acts. The book received the Association of American Law Schools Distinguished Book Award in 2017, and was translated into Chinese in 2016.

== Background ==
Ruskola developed the concept of "legal Orientalism" from a recurring experience. When he told people he taught Chinese law, they often replied that no such thing existed. Initially irritating, this consistent response prompted him to investigate why people so insistently believe China lacks "real law." He traces Western views of Chinese law through distinct phases. Sixteenth-century Jesuit missionaries painted China favorably as a country ruled by virtue and law. Montesquieu in the eighteenth century introduced the concept of Oriental despotism, which became European philosophical orthodoxy. By the nineteenth century, British traders replaced missionaries as the primary source of information about China. They complained that Chinese law was arbitrary and despotic. This history shaped American policy. After the Opium War, the United States adopted British practices of extraterritorial jurisdiction, insisting that Chinese law was too barbaric to apply to Americans. This occurred more than half a century before the Spanish-American War launched U.S. territorial colonialism. Ruskola emphasizes that this history carries no direct prescriptions for contemporary law reform projects. But it should make reformers more mindful of imperial legacies. Rule of law and democracy, he suggests, should emerge indigenously rather than be imposed. Imposing democracy would be an oxymoron.

== Summary ==
Ruskola interrogates the interdependence of global power and jurisprudence. He examines how the United States constructed its legal identity against an imagined Chinese lawlessness. Ruskola argues that the modern concept of "rule of law" crystallized through opposition to a perceived Eastern despotism. Ruskola employs postcolonial theory and diplomatic history to show how European prejudices about Chinese law developed into American ideology and imperial practice. This dynamic functions not as cultural prejudice but as a structural element creating legal subjects and justifying international hierarchies.

The author dissects major European social theorists—Montesquieu, Hegel, Marx, Weber—who depicted China as static to validate progressive Western legal subjectivity. Ruskola dismantles these foundations by comparing Chinese family law with Western corporate law. He deploys reversible analogies: Chinese kinship clans as functional corporations, American corporate structures as kinship systems. This methodology unsettles the assumption that corporate personhood represents a uniquely Western achievement. The comparison aims not to reduce difference but to narrow the gap between supposedly polar opposites.

The narrative traces legal Orientalism's institutionalization through American extraterritoriality. Ruskola documents the shift in U.S. diplomacy from recognizing Chinese sovereignty to practicing free-trade imperialism via the Treaty of Wanghia in 1844 (reperiodizing U.S. empire to this date rather than 1898). He scrutinizes the United States Court for China in Shanghai, which applied a haphazard mix of codes from Alaska and the District of Columbia to U.S. citizens abroad. Constitutional protections did not apply. This legal export constructed an idiosyncratic jurisdiction that imposed judicial despotism in the name of the rule of law.

The author demonstrates how Orientalist discourses pervaded domestic American jurisprudence. Rhetoric concerning Chinese incapacity for republican government justified suspending constitutional protections in the Chinese Exclusion cases. The Supreme Court upheld exclusion laws on "plenary powers" doctrine—discretionary authority unconstrained by the Constitution. This precedent remains influential in administrative law today.

Ruskola evaluates China's post-1978 legal reforms and WTO entry. He suggests China engages in self-Orientalization, adopting Western norms to secure legitimacy—"colonialism without colonizers." Yet he emphasizes that Chinese adaptations are creative acts, not mere imitation. He portrays law as a medium for world-making and an instrument of empire. Ruskola challenges comparatists to recognize that description of foreign law always proceeds from prejudice, and advocates an "ethics of Orientalism" that manages rather than eliminates bias.

== Critical reception ==
Legal Orientalism has generated multiple debates in several disciplines (including history, comparative law, international law, political theory, and postcolonial studies) in the United States, Canada, the United Kingdom, and Germany. (Note: A 2023 article titled "Beyond Anti-Anti-Orientalism, or How Not to Study Chinese Law" was published in The American Journal of Comparative Law. Donald Clarke, of George Washington University Law School, wrote a response to this article, "Response to Professor Ruskola", published in the same issue of the journal.)

The book was published in Chinese translation in 2016 by the China University of Political Science and Law Press. It has been the subject of five Chinese print symposia and special publications as well as an international conference organized by Peking University in 2018. (Note: Peking University School of Transnational Law hosted an academic symposium titled "China, The U.S. and Comparative Law Today" on November 23–24, 2018, as part of the school's 10th anniversary celebrations. The event featured a main public session in which Ruskola discussed his book with leading scholars from China and abroad. Liang Zhiping of the Chinese National Academy of Arts responded by arguing that China had not experienced changes akin to Western reform models and therefore needed to establish a new legal foundation incorporating elements of its own traditions. Zheng Ge of Shanghai Jiao Tong University KoGuan Law School presented his commentary and analyzed Ruskola's account of Chinese traditional law in comparison with depictions by other Chinese scholars. The symposium included four workshops that studied the concept of legal orientalism from multiple perspectives, with some speakers challenging the existence of the phenomenon and its implications for comparative law, while others explored how legal orientalism has shaped legal development in the United States and considered its potential influence on legal reform in China. Participants included faculty from Peking University, Tsinghua University, Shanghai Jiao Tong University, Emory University, and Hong Kong University.)

In 2022, the Commercial Press published an edited collection of essays on the book's reception in China, entitled Legal Orientalism in China: Critiques and Reflections. The debate in China has centered largely on significance of the history of legal Orientalism for Chinese law reform, potentially questioning the possibility of an authentically "Chinese" modern legal system.

American political scientist Jennifer Pitts described the work as "remarkable" and "one of the most compelling examples in recent legal scholarship of the power of a postcolonial theoretical orientation." While James Hevia reminded that Ruskola was "among the first to bring this interpretative sensibility into the study of law and Sino-American relations between the Opium Wars and World War II." Tahirih Lee considered it a work that is "more provocative" than comparable studies of extraterritoriality in East Asia, and Carol G.S. Tan described it as an "impressively imaginative" work.

Keally McBride called the work a "brilliant excavation of the legal products wrought from colonial pillage, orientalist judgments, high-minded legal rhetoric, and gritty international relations." However, she questioned whether Orientalism served as justification or catalyst in the history presented. Margaret K. Lewis believed that book was "strongest in raising questions, not in answering them definitively," and Timothy Webster deemed it a "magisterial account" of Western views on Chinese law from the Enlightenment onward.
