= Gertrud Alexander =

German art critic and author

- Born: Gertrud Mathilde Bertha Gaudin; 7 January 1882; Ruhla, Germany
- Died: 22 March 1967 (aged 85); Moscow, Soviet Union
- Occupations: political journalist & editor art critic
- Political party: SPD; Spartacus League; KPD; CPSU
- Spouse: Eduard Ludwig Alexander (1881–1945)

Gertrud Alexander (born Gertrud Gaudin: 7 January 1882 – 22 March 1967) was a communist activist and politician, originally from Germany. She made her mark as an author, journalist and art critic.

== Pseudonyms ==
Her published output appears and is archived under a range of (mostly related) identities as follows:

- "GGL Alexander"
- "Gertrud G. L. Alexander"
- "Gertrud Gaudin Ludwig Alexander"
- "G.G.L."
- "G.G.(G.) Ludwig"
- "Gertruda Alexander"
- "A.L."
- "g.g.g."
- "Fr. Jerome"

Sometimes her output is archived or listed simply under "Gertrude Alexander".

== Life ==
Gertrud Mathilde Bertha Gaudin was born in Ruhla, a small town in the hills west of Gotha. Her father was a doctor. She attended the University of Jena, moving on to the Arts Academy in Eisenach and then to the Prussian Academy of Arts in Berlin. She funded her education by working as a teacher of drawing. She continued to be employed by the secondary schools teaching service as an art teacher till 1908.

She met Eduard Ludwig Alexander (1881–1945) in 1902. He was a law student at Jena and later, from 1911, a Berlin lawyer. Gertrud Gaudin and Eduard Ludwig Alexander married one another in Berlin in 1908. The marriage produced two recorded children, but ended in divorce during the 1920s.

She got to know Clara Zetkin in 1907 and began working for the social democratic press: one of her early assignments involved writing a series of articles during 1909 entitled "Die Prometheussage" ("The Prometheus Saga") for the women's news journal "Die Gleichheit" ("Equality"). In her married name, as Gertrud Alexander, she became a member of the Social Democratic Party (SPD).

During the First World War (1914–1918) she engaged in illegal political work, and in 1917 she was a co-founder, with her husband, of the Spartacus League which had originated as the anti-war faction within the SPD, but became increasingly separated from it as the ramifications of the contentious SPD leadership decision taken back in 1914, to call what amounted to a political truce for the duration of hostilities, became ever more acute. As the political left continued to fragment, at the end of 1919 Gertrud and Eduard Alexander became founder members of the Communist Party of Germany. The party was consciously modeled on structures devised by Lenin, and within its Agitprop department, Gertrud headed up the culture department. She took responsibility for the "Feuilleton" supplement in the party newspaper Die Rote Fahne ("The Red Flag").

During her time as editor of the "Feuilleton" supplement between 1919 and 1925 around 160 of her contributions appeared, and she was widely seen as the most important arts and culture critic in the Communist Party. In April 1923 she also started to work in the party's main Training and Propaganda section.

In the so-called Kunstlump debate, ignited on the political left during 1920, Alexander took a position resolutely opposed to that of John Heartfield and George Grosz. Her rejection of "Dadaist anti-art" was set out clearly in her address on the opening of Berlin's first proletarian theatre by Erwin Piscator at the end of 1920.

In 1923, together with Hermann Duncker and Karl August Wittfogel, she devised the "Emergency Cultural Political Programme of the Communist Party". With her husband and elder son she participated in the Marxist Work Week (conference) in May 1923 which prepared the way for the creation of the Frankfurt based Institute for Social Research. In 1925 she relocated to Moscow (accompanied by her two young sons) from where, till 1930, she worked as a correspondent for the Die Rote Fahne ("The Red Flag"). In Moscow she was accepted into the women's secretariat of the Comintern.

In 1926 Alexander joined the Soviet Communist Party. Between 1931 and 1939 she held a position of responsibility with the "Main Administration for Literary and Publishing Affairs" ("Glavlit" / "Главное управление по делам литературы и издательств" / "Главлит") (which was concerned with censorship). She also held a job as political editor at the "Main Moscow National Library" and at the "Lenin Library". During the Stalin purge she was detained in 1937, but only briefly. Between 1939 and 1944 she was evacuated from Moscow. After the war ended, formally in May 1945, she remained in Moscow, supporting herself as a freelance translator and contributing editor for the Soviet Information Bureau and for the magazine Soviet Literature, which was produced in Moscow various languages including, between 1946 and 1991, German.

Gertrud Alexander died in Moscow on 22 March 1967. She was 85.
