= Rudolf Bahro =

German politician and writer (1935–1997)

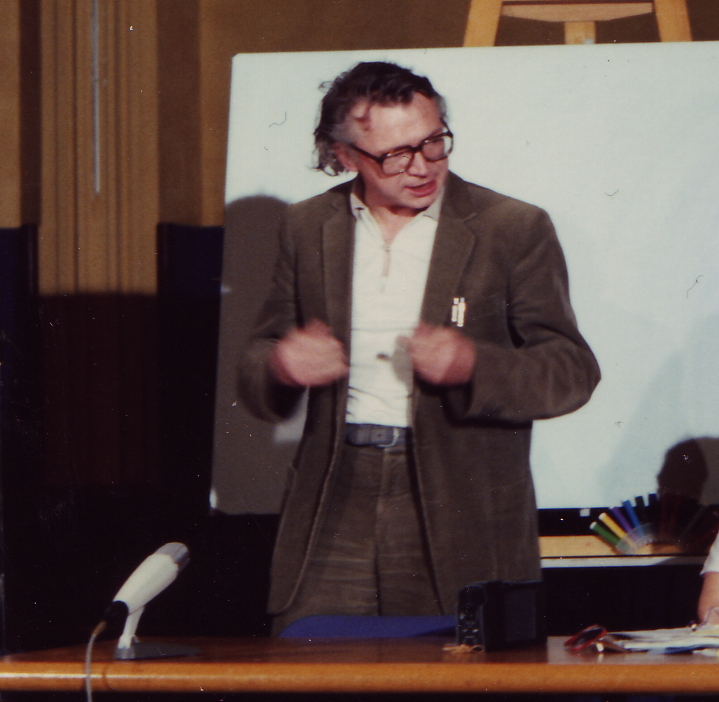
- Bahro in 1991
- Born: 18 November 1935; Bad Flinsberg, Free State of Prussia, German Reich (now Świeradów-Zdrój, Poland)
- Died: 5 December 1997 (aged 62); Berlin, Germany
- Occupations: Philosopher, politician

Rudolf Bahro (18 November 1935 – 5 December 1997) was a dissident from East Germany who, since his death, has been recognized as a philosopher, political figure and author. Bahro was a leader of the West German party The Greens, but left the party after becoming disenchanted with the party. Bahro spent the remainder of his life exploring spiritual approaches to sustainability at Humboldt University in Berlin.

== Early life and education ==
Bahro was the eldest of three children of Max Bahro, a livestock-industry consultant, and Irmgard Bahro (née Conrad). Until 1945, the family lived in Lower Silesia: first in the spa town of Bad Flinsberg and then in neighboring Gerlachsheim, where Bahro attended the village school. Towards the end of World War II Max Bahro was drafted into the Volkssturm, and, after his capture, detained as a Polish prisoner. As the Eastern Front approached, the family was evacuated and Bahro was separated from his mother and siblings during the flight (the rest of Bahro's family, with the exception of his father, died of typhoid soon afterwards). Bahro lived with an aunt in Austria and Hesse, spending several months in each location and eventually reuniting with his father, who was managing a widow's farm in Rießen (now part of Siehdichum).

From 1950 to 1954, Bahro attended high school in Fürstenberg (now part of Eisenhüttenstadt). Since it was assumed that all high-school students would join the Free German Youth (FDJ), Bahro reluctantly joined in 1950. This was, as he later commented, the only time he did something against his will under pressure. In 1952 he applied for membership in the Socialist Unity Party (SED), which he joined in 1954. Bahro was regarded as intelligent, and graduated from high school with honors. He attended Humboldt University in Berlin from 1954 to 1959 and studied philosophy. Among his teachers were Kurt Hager (who later became the philosopher of the SED), Georg Klaus and Wolfgang Heise. The topic of his thesis was "Johannes R. Becher and the relationship of the German working class and its party to the national question of our people".

Until 1956, Bahro was an admirer of Lenin and Stalin; Khrushchev's leaked "secret speech" in February 1956 changed his views. He followed the Polish October and the Hungarian Revolution with great interest, expressed his solidarity with the insurgents in a wall newspaper and openly criticized the restricted-information policy of the GDR leadership. As a result of his views, national security spied on him for two years.

== Party work ==
After passing the government licensing examination, the SED sent Bahro to Sachsendorf (a part of Lindendorf). He edited a local newspaper, Die Linie (The Line) and encouraged the area's farmers to join the LPG agricultural cooperative. In 1959 Bahro married Gundula Lambke, a Russian language teacher. The couple had two daughters (one of whom died at birth) and a son, in addition to Gundula's daughter. In 1960 Bahro was appointed to the party leadership of the University of Greifswald, where he founded the Unsere Universität ("Our University") newspaper and served as editor-in-chief. The same year saw the publication of his first book, a collection of poems entitled In dieser Richtung (In This Direction). Beginning in 1962, Bahro worked as a consultant for the Corporate Executive Committee of the Union of Science (one of the divisions of the Free German Trade Union Federation) in Berlin; in 1965 he was appointed deputy chief of the Freie Deutsche Jugend (FDJ) student magazine, Forum. During Bahro's tenure with the FDJ he was hampered by conflict with the increasingly restrictive policies of the SED, which made him a target of criticism. Due to the unauthorized publication of an article by Volker Braun, Bahro was dismissed as deputy chief in 1967.

== Evolution of ideas ==
From 1967 to 1977 Bahro worked for a number of companies in the rubber and plastics industry as an organization development specialist. Seeing conditions in the factories soon brought him to the conclusion that the East German economy was in a crisis and the primary reason for this was that workers had little voice in the workplace. He expressed this view in a December 1967 letter to the Chairman of the State Council, Walter Ulbricht, proposing a transfer of workplace responsibility to the workers with grassroots democracy. A few weeks later, the Prague Spring began; Bahro took a lively interest, supported the movement. In May 1968 he was interviewed by a member of the Central Committee, who made it clear that his solidarity with the "counter-revolution" was no longer tolerated. This led Bahro to develop his ideas systematically, and to publish them. His decision was reinforced by the Warsaw Pact invasion of Czechoslovakia on 21 August. This was, as Bahro later said, "the blackest day" of his life and the reason for his final break with the SED. He decided not to make the break publicly, to protect his book project.

In 1972 Bahro began part-time work on his dissertation on development conditions of high-school and technical-college groups in the VEBs (state-owned enterprises of the GDR). At the same time, he secretly wrote a thematically broader manuscript which later became The Alternative. In 1973, Gundula filed for divorce; both spouses said later this was as a precautionary measure to protect the children against government reprisals. However, in 1974 Gundula informed state security about the secret book project and handed over a copy of the manuscript; after that, Bahro was under surveillance.

In 1975 Bahro submitted his dissertation at the Technical University Leuna-Merseburg, which was evaluated favorably by three reviewers. The Stasi intervened, engineering two opposing reviews. His work on The Alternative was unhindered, but Bahro was convinced that he would be unable to disseminate his book to the GDR citizenry. In December 1976 he learned that one of his samizdats had fallen into Stasi hands, which prompted him to finish his work quickly. Intermediaries arranged a contract with Europäische Verlagsanstalt, a West German publisher. Swiss musicologist Harry Goldschmidt smuggled the finished manuscript into West Berlin, and copies of the manuscript reached individuals in the GDR by mail.

Later in West Germany, Bahro said that the theoretical bases for The Alternative were Karl August Wittfogel's 1957 Oriental Despotism: A Comparative Study of Total Power and earlier Marxist works. He was unable to cite Wittfogel because of the latter's anticommunism. Wittfogel also influenced Bahro's later ecological work.

== The Alternative ==
The Alternative is divided into three parts:

1. The non-capitalist path to an industrial society
2. Anatomy of socialism
3. Strategy for a communist alternative

The introduction begins with the premise that the Communist movement did not lead to the theoretically expected situation, but instead continued on the capitalist path with only superficial changes. "Alienation and the subaltern mentality of the working masses continue on a new level." The book analyzes the reasons for this, and offers solutions.

The first part is a historical analysis of the development of socialism in the Soviet Union. Bahro concludes that in the Soviet Union (and, consequently, also in countries such as the GDR) not the theoretically expected socialism but a form of proto-socialism had emerged. For the reason, he posits that at the time of the October Revolution the Soviet Union was far from the stage of development presumed in Marx's theory of history. Nevertheless, the path chosen by Lenin was correct. Bahro regards Stalin's subsequent massive industrialization as a necessary development, justifying the party purge as inevitable.

In the second part, Bahro analyzes the existing social system, which he believes was incorrectly called "real socialism" when in reality it was still a class society. He details how this society worked, and argues that this provided the rationale for the observed economic stagnation.

In the third part, he develops solutions, including a call for a new revolution which would transform not only the social circumstances but the people. Its intention is to overcome the subaltern mentality, the "form of existence and way of thinking of ordinary people." He demands the abolition of the division of labor; all should participate in science, art and menial work.

== Response ==
On 22 August 1977, the West German magazine Der Spiegel published an extract from The Alternative and an interview with Bahro, during which he admitted writing the book. The next day, Bahro was arrested and taken to the Berlin-Hohenschönhausen prison. That evening, West German television stations ARD and ZDF broadcast Bahro's interview.

In early September, the book went on sale. The first edition was sold out before delivery, and was translated into other languages. The Alternative sparked debate in the West European left about the nature of socialism. From November 16-19 an "International Congress on and for Rudolf Bahro" was held in West Berlin. Notable leftists from around Europe, such as Herbert Marcuse, Pierre Frank, Rudi Dutschke, and others attended. Their contributions were subsequently published. They also called for Bahro's release from prison. Among the attendees was Herbert Marcuse, who considered Bahro's book "the most important contribution to Marxist theory and practice that has appeared in recent decades;" a similar view was expressed by the Trotskyist Ernest Mandel, who called the book "the most important theoretical work to come out of the countries that have abolished capitalism since Leon Trotsky's The Revolution Betrayed." To Lawrence Krader, Bahro was the "conscience of the revolution, the strength of the truth". Rudi Dutschke was critical, classifying Bahro as detached from Leninism with too little respect for human rights and calling his suggestions "totally unrealistic." In contrast Ivan Szelenyi criticized what he referred to as Bahro's "neo-Leninism" and "neo-Bolshevism."

These analyses were accompanied by a broad wave of publicly expressed solidarity with Bahro, climaxing in a letter by Heinrich Böll and Günter Grass in The Times on 1 February 1978 that was also signed by Arthur Miller, Graham Greene, Carol Stern, Mikis Theodorakis and other celebrities. In the GDR, however, Bahro's recognition was suppressed, and he was told nothing of the reaction to his book and subsequent arrest. About half of the copies of The Alternative, which Bahro had mailed shortly before his arrest in the GDR, were intercepted by East German authorities. His influence on East German students was thus limited.

To write and publish a book was, in itself, legal in the GDR; however, Bahro was accused of working for the West German intelligence service (from whom he was thought to have obtained his information). On 30 June 1978, Bahro was convicted in camera of treason and betraying state secrets and sentenced to eight years' imprisonment. Evidence indicates a kangaroo court with a predetermined verdict; an appeal to the Supreme Court of the GDR filed by defense attorney Gregor Gysi was summarily rejected as unfounded.

The verdict immediately sparked violent protests and expressions of solidarity in the West. The Committee for the Release of Rudolf Bahro organized an international conference, held 16 to 19 November 1978 in West Berlin and attended by over 2,000 participants. The depth of solidarity is illustrated by an appeal to the State Council of the GDR in the Frankfurter Rundschau of 11 May 1979, organized by Bahro Committee in 12 countries and signed by a number of celebrities. Bahro was awarded the Carl von Ossietzky Medal by the International League for Human Rights (Berlin) and made a member of the Swedish and Danish chapters of PEN International.

On 11 October 1979, the 30th anniversary of the founding of the GDR, Bahro was granted amnesty. On 17 October he was deported with his former wife, their two children and his partner Ursula Beneke to the Federal Republic of Germany, in accordance with his July request.

== West German work ==
In West Germany Bahro soon joined the nascent party The Greens, making a commitment to unite socialist and values-based conservatism currents in the new party since compromise was a necessity. His 1980 book Socialism and Survival formulated elements of a new policy: the relationship between ecology and socialism. Breaking from his position in The Alternative, Bahro now felt that classical Marxism was no longer appropriate.

Another new motif in Bahro's thinking was religion. While in custody he had studied the Bible, and when he moved to the west, he noticed unhappiness in spite of material prosperity. He interpreted this as a lack of introspection and transcendence, rejecting the traditionally materialistic outlook of socialism. The goal of human emancipation was represented (in different ways) by Karl Marx and Jesus Christ. In this context, Bahro referred to early Christianity and liberation theology.

At the beginning of 1980, Bahro studied with Oskar Negt at the University of Hanover. His thesis appeared as a book, A Plea for Creative Initiative. In 1983, he earned his habilitation in social philosophy.

In 1982, Bahro adopted a more radical position due to the contemporary economic crisis. He advocated a restructuring of society in economic, environmental and social-policy terms, which should be linked to a broad retreat from the world market and a move away from capitalist industry. Bahro also became involved in the peace movement, advocating a nuclear-free Europe.

Bahro's Dare Commune was an alternative community during the early days of the Greens. He believed that the transformation of society must begin on a small scale, requiring a change in the people themselves and a rediscovery of spirituality. Bahro was influenced by the Congregation of the Benedictines and the mystical experience of God.

In 1981 Bahro visited North Korea, where he was received as a guest of the state. He saw this as his most important trip, to a state he admired with a system "to satisfy all the basic requirements of security". As part of a lecture tour of the United States in summer 1983, Bahro enjoyed several weeks at Rajneeshpuram with Bhagwan Shree Rajneesh (Osho).

After the Green Party entered the Bundestag for the first time in March 1983, the question arose whether they would join a coalition with the Social Democratic Party of Germany (the SPD) or remain in opposition. Bahro strongly favored the latter option (which placed him in opposition to Joschka Fischer), and believed in renewal rather than reform. In his December 1984 "Hamburg speech," Bahro made a comparison with the political and social situation in the Weimar Republic: At that time, there had also been a broad movement in society that was dissatisfied with prevailing conditions and wanted change. What mattered now was to prevent the errors and political disasters of the past. In the Weimar Republic, the "brown" pole of the political spectrum (the Nazis) overpowered the left with "nationalist mythology in disguise; therefore, resistance to capitalist development" could not begin. Bahro's "popular uprising" could occur this time without violence, but it was important that the Greens "are not lost" in the system. Bahro also called for the conquest of the right-left divide: to escape its minority position, the Greens should also "penetrate the territory of the Bavarian CSU." Bahro's Hamburg speech ended with the allegation that Joschka Fischer's supporters had a lust for power, a situation that could lead to civil war and subsequent dictatorship.

During the summer of 1985 Bahro left the Greens and focused on his new book, which was published in 1987 as Logic of Salvation. In it he described a "logic of self-extermination" and its consequences for humanity at present, presenting a "logic of life" requiring a "leap in consciousness" and a withdrawal from the industrial "mega-machine." It was important to implement a "rescue policy," before the worsening environmental crisis leads to an emergency government. Bahro called for long-term goals, the elimination of short-term tactics and government decentralization. He advocated an "invisible church," which would provide the necessary spiritual dimension. As a conservative on the left, he noted common ground with CDU politician and critic Kurt Biedenkopf. Inspired by Mikhail Gorbachev's perestroika, Bahro hoped for a "prince of environmental change" and suggested the establishment of a consensus-oriented body similar to the British House of Lords. The book met a mostly negative response, and Bahro's references to a prince and an invisible church were criticized.

In 1986, Bahro held "learning workshops" at his home in Worms, which featured discussion of his ideas and meditation. He met Beatrice Ingermann, who had been conducting a similar project since 1983 that at a community in the Eifel. Bahro joined her group; they married in 1988 and had a daughter.

== In Berlin after the fall of the Wall ==
Seeing the rapid decline of the GDR, at the end of 1989 Bahro went to East Berlin to fight against the feared "sellout of the GDR," its absorption by the Federal Republic. He wanted to work to ensure that the regime could keep its autonomy and maintain what he thought was its greatest political achievement: the primacy of politics over economics.

On 16 December 1989, Bahro had the opportunity of speaking to the assembled delegates of the extraordinary party conference of the Socialist Unity Party of Germany, whose chairman had been his former legal counsel, Gregor Gysi. The main item on the agenda was whether the party should continue or be dissolved. What was finally decided was that the party should continue under a new name: Socialist Unity Party of Germany – Party of Democratic Socialism (German: Sozialistische Einheitspartei Deutschlands – Partei des Demokratischen Sozialismus, abbreviated SED-PDS). Bahro's request to address the conference as a guest speaker found only a slight majority (54%), and he was granted only 30 minutes, not the requested 45 minutes. Bahro was annoyed at this and had to improvise. After reading out the names of all the people who had helped him with his book Die Alternative, he criticized the previous speaker, Minister President and Deputy Party Chairman Hans Modrow, as well as Karl Marx, Gorbachev and Boris Yeltsin. He went on to present his vision of a "socio-ecological" restructuring of the GDR. His radical environmental ideas, which were hardly known in the GDR at that time, were far removed from the problems that interested the delegates, and his polemical introduction provoked fierce resentment. Bahro concluded that he no longer had anything in common with this party.

In the spring of 1990, he began setting up an "Institute for Social Ecology" at the Humboldt University of Berlin. Instead of the usual discussion of the ecological crisis, he wanted this institute to address the issue holistically and, above all, study the deeper social and cultural causes of the crisis and develop practical alternatives. Bahro thus set up his own school of social science that is not to be confused with others that also go by the name of social ecology.

On 16 June 1990, again represented by Gysi, Bahro was rehabilitated by the Supreme Court of the GDR. On 15 September, shortly before the end of the GDR, the Minister of Education and Science appointed him associate professor of social ecology at Humboldt University. From the winter semester 1990/91, Bahro regularly held lectures on issues of the environmental crisis, where he further developed the theories that he had put forward in his book Logik der Rettung (published in English as Avoiding Social and Ecological Disaster: The Politics of World Transformation: An Inquiry into the Foundations of Spiritual and Ecological Politics). The lectures, to which he frequently invited guest speakers, were aimed at students in all years and also attracted an audience from outside the university. In the first years, the main lecture hall (auditorium maximum) of the university was consistently full, which resulted in increased sales of his book on which the lectures were based. However, the Institute remained a temporary arrangement that could only exist thanks to financial support from the Schweisfurth Foundation. It was not until 1995 that the institute was integrated into the university as a working group of the Faculty of Agriculture and Horticulture.

In 1990, there were accusations that Bahro was striving for "eco-dictatorship." This accusation was made particularly aggressively by the Association for the Advancement of Psychological Knowledge of Human Nature, a right-wing organization founded in Zurich which, in a work titled The Fascism of the New Left, claimed that Bahro's real goal was an "eco-fascist dictatorship." Bahro indignantly denied this but soon found himself confronted with more accusations of this nature. The accusations were based on quotations from his book Logik der Rettung. In 1992, a former party colleague of his, Jutta Ditfurth, joined the debate when, in her book Feuer in die Herzen [Putting Fire in the Hearts], she accused him of turning to esoteric, authoritarian and nationalist ideas.

In addition to his activities in Berlin, until 1991 Bahro also active in the Lernwerkstatt [Learning Workshop] a non-profit organization in Niederstadtfeld, in which he planned similar experiments with new sustainable living and economic systems in the former GDR. A conversation with the Minister-President of Saxony, Kurt Biedenkopf, in the summer of 1991 led to the socio-ecological futurology project LebensGut in the village of Pommritz, near Bautzen. There the socio-ecological research begun at the Humboldt University is also being continued, mainly by Bahro's former associate Maik Hosang.

In September 1993, Bahro's wife Beatrice committed suicide following a marital dispute. Bahro was so devastated that he canceled a semester of lectures. In the spring of 1994, he also became physically ill, and in the autumn of that year he was diagnosed with non-Hodgkin's lymphoma. Bahro was convinced that his illness was the consequence of traumatic experiences such as the suicide of his wife, so he resisted conventional therapy, instead trying various alternative methods of diagnosis and therapy and temporarily moving into a monastery. Only after his condition deteriorated dramatically did he agree to another course of chemotherapy. In May 1995, on his sickbed, he married his girlfriend and companion Marina Lehnert, who had been caring for his daughter for some time.

After a year's break due to illness, in summer 1996 Bahro resumed teaching, but only to a limited extent. He gave his last lecture in July 1997. After that, he caught pneumonia and the cancer broke out again.

Rudolf Bahro died in Berlin on 5 December 1997 and was buried at the Dorotheenstadt cemetery in Berlin.

== Publications available in English ==
- The Alternative in Eastern Europe, New Left Books/Verso, ISBN 0-86091-006-7 [1977 (German), 1978 (English)]
- Socialism and Survival [1980 (German); 1982 (English)]
- From Red To Green [1984]
- Building The Green Movement [1986]
- Avoiding Social & Ecological Disaster: The Politics of World Transformation [1987 (German), 1994 (English)]

== Selected publications ==
- "Rapallo? Why Not? Reply to Gorz". Telos 51 (Spring 1982). New York: Telos Press

Awards
Preceded by S. S. Prawer	Deutscher Memorial Prize; 1978	Succeeded by G. A. Cohen
