= Hydraulic empire =

Government by control of access to water

A hydraulic empire, also known as a hydraulic despotism, hydraulic society, hydraulic civilization, or water monopoly empire, is a social or government structure which maintains power through control over water. It arises through an ecological need for flood control and irrigation, which requires central coordination and a specialized bureaucracy. The term was promoted by Karl August Wittfogel's book Oriental Despotism: A Comparative Study of Total Power (1957).

Often associated with these terms and concepts is the notion of a water dynasty. This body is a political structure which is commonly characterized by a system of hierarchy and control often based on class or caste. Power, both over resources (food, water, energy) and a means of enforcement such as the military, is vital for the maintenance of control.

== Civilizations ==
A developed hydraulic civilization maintains control over its population by means of controlling the supply of water. Wittfogel asserted that such "hydraulic civilizations", although they were not all located in the Orient or characteristic of all Oriental societies, were essentially different from those of the Western world. According to Wittfogel, most of the first civilizations in history, such as Ancient Egypt, Mesopotamia, China, India, Pre-Columbian Mexico and Peru, are believed to have been hydraulic empires. Most hydraulic empires existed in arid or desert regions such as Timbuktu on the Niger river, or Tekrur on the Senegal river, if the model still stands today, but imperial China also had some such characteristics.

The Maurya Empire in India was classified by Wittfogel as a grandiose hydraulic economy. Kautilya while referring to the udakabhaga (water-cess, cess being a term used in India, Scotland and Ireland for an additional tax) lists various kinds of irrigation, viz., irrigated by manual labour, by carrying water on the shoulder, by water lifts, and by raising water from lakes, rivers etc. Some scholars believe the Arthashastra makes a clear reference to canals for irrigation, in a sutra which points out that water was set in motion by digging (khatapravrittim) from a river-dam (nandinibhandayatana) or a tank.

Apart from Ancient Egypt and the Kingdom of Kush, the Ajuran Sultanate of the Horn of Africa was the only other hydraulic empire in Africa. In the 13th century, the Ajuran began to monopolize the water resources of the Jubba and Shebelle rivers. Through hydraulic engineering, they also constructed many of the state's limestone wells and cisterns that are still in use today. Its rulers developed new systems for agriculture and taxation, which continued to be used in parts of the Horn of Africa as late as the 19th century.

== Analysis ==
Wittfogel argues that climate caused some parts of the world to develop higher levels of civilization than others. He is known for claiming that climate in the Orient led to despotic rule. This environmental determinism comes to bear when considering that in those societies where the most control was exhibited, this was commonly the case due to the central role of the resource in economic processes and its environmentally limited, or constrained nature. This made controlling supply and demand easier and allowed a more complete monopoly to be established, as well as preventing the use of alternative resources to compensate.

The typical hydraulic empire government, in Wittfogel's thesis, is extremely centralized, with no trace of an independent aristocracy – in contrast to the decentralized feudalism of medieval Europe. Though tribal societies had structures that were usually personal in nature, exercised by a patriarch over a tribal group related by various degrees of kinship, hydraulic hierarchies gave rise to the established permanent institution of impersonal government. Popular revolution in such a state was impossible: a dynasty might die out or be overthrown by force, but the new regime would differ very little from the old one. Hydraulic empires were only ever destroyed by foreign conquerors, he states.

=== Critical assessment ===
Wittfogel's ideas, when applied to China, have been harshly criticized by scholars such as Joseph Needham who argued essentially that Wittfogel was operating from ignorance of basic Chinese history. Needham argued that the Chinese government was not despotic, was not dominated by a priesthood, had many peasant rebellions, and that Wittfogel's perspective does not address the necessity and presence of bureaucracy in modern Western civilization. Robert L. Carneiro was also critical of Wittfogel's theory, writing in Science in August 1970:

This theory has recently run into difficulties. Archeological evidence now makes it appear that in at least three of the areas that Wittfogel cites as exemplifying his "hydraulic hypothesis"—Mesopotamia, China, and Mexico—full-fledged states developed well before large-scale irrigation.

With regard to Mesopotamia, Carneiro cited Robert McCormick Adams, Jr., who had concluded: "In short, there is nothing to suggest that the rise of dynastic authority in southern Mesopotamia was linked to the administrative requirements of a major canal system." On China, which Carneiro called "the prototypical area for Wittfogel's hydraulic theories", he quoted Jacques Gernet who had recently written:

although the establishment of a system of regulation of water courses and irrigation, and the control of this system, may have affected the political constitution of the military states and imperial China, the fact remains that, historically, it was the pre-existing state structures and the large, well-trained labour force provided by the armies that made the great irrigation projects possible.

Turning to Mexico, Carneiro wrote: "large-scale irrigation systems do not appear to antedate the Classic period, whereas it is clear that the first states arose in the preceding Formative or Pre-Classic period". Of hydraulic empires generally, Carneiro commented:

This is not to say, of course, that large-scale irrigation, where it occurred, did not contribute significantly to increasing the power and scope of the state. It unquestionably did. To the extent that Wittfogel limits himself to this contention, I have no quarrel with him whatever. However, the point at issue is not how the state increased its power but how it arose in the first place. And to this issue the hydraulic hypothesis does not appear to hold the key.

The same elements of resource control central to hydraulic empire were also central to Europe's colonization of much of the global South. Colonies were resource rich areas located on the periphery, and the contemporary models of core-periphery interaction were focused on the extraction and control of these resources for the use of the core. This was accomplished through a type of agro-managerial despotism with close connections to debates around hydraulic empire.

== See also ==
- Outline of water
- Asiatic mode of production
- River valley civilization
- Oriental despotism
- Thalassocracy – Sea-based state or society
- Dune
- Majapahit
