= Imperial China: 900–1800 =

Book by Frederick W. Mote

- Author: Frederick W. Mote
- Cover artist: Detail from The Kangxi Emperor's Southern Inspection Tour scroll
- Language: English
- Subject: Chinese history
- Publisher: Harvard University Press
- Publication date: 1999
- Publication place: United States
- Media type: Paperback/Hardcover
- Pages: 1136
- ISBN: 0-674-01212-7
- OCLC: 54436613

Imperial China: 900–1800 is a history book written by Frederick W. Mote, Professor of Chinese History and Civilization, Emeritus, at Princeton University. The book was published in 1999 by Harvard University Press.

== Scope ==
As the title suggests, Imperial China covers the 900-year period from the year 900 to 1800. In terms of Chinese history, it covers the period from the fall of the Tang dynasty to the middle of the Qing dynasty, shortly before the beginning of China's Century of Humiliation at the end of the Qing dynasty. It covers the Five Dynasties and Ten Kingdoms period, Liao dynasty, Song dynasty, Western Xia state, Jin dynasty, Yuan dynasty, Ming dynasty and the first 150 years of the Qing dynasty.

== Contents ==
The nearly 1,000 pages of text are divided into five parts and are further divided into 36 chapters.

=== Part One ===
Conquest Dynasties and the Northern Song: 900–1127

- 1. The Five Dynasties
- 2. Abaoji
- 3. Building the Liao Empire
- 4. Liao Civilization
- 5. Creating the Song Dynasty
- 6. The World of Ideas in Northern Song China
- 7. Dimensions of Northern Song Life
- 8. Origins of the Xi Xia State

=== Part Two ===
Conquest Dynasties and the Southern Song: 1127–1279

- 9. The "Wild Jurchens" Erupt into History
- 10. The Jurchen State and Its Cultural Policy
- 11. The Later Xi Xia State
- 12. Trends of Change under Jin Alien Rule
- 13. The Southern Song and Chinese Survival
- 14. Chinese Civilization and the Song Achievement
- 15. Southern Song Life – A Broader View
- 16. A Mid-Thirteenth-Century Overview

=== Part Three ===
China and the Mongol World

- 17. The Career of the Great Khan Chinggis
- 18. Forging the Mongol World Empire
- 19. Khubilai Khan Becomes Emperor of China
- 20. China under Mongol Rule

=== Part Four ===
The Restoration of Native Rule Under the Ming

- 21. From Chaos toward a New Chinese Order
- 22. Zhu Yuanzhang Builds His Ming Dynasty
- 23. Civil War and Usurpation
- 24. The "Second Founding" of the Ming Dynasty
- 25. Ming China in the Fifteenth century
- 26. The Changing World of the Sixteenth century
- 27. Ming China's Borders
- 28. Late Ming Political Decline, 1567–1627
- 29. The Lively Society of the Late Ming
- 30. The Course of Ming Failure

=== Part Five ===
China and the World in Early Qing Times

- 31. Alien Rule Returns
- 32. The Kangxi Emperor: Coming of Age
- 33. The Kangxi Reign: The Emperor and His Empire
- 34. The Yongzheng Emperor as Man and Ruler
- 35. Splendor and Degeneration, 1736–1799
- 36. China's Legacy in a Changing World

== Reception ==
Reviewers generally considered the book comprehensive. Lucian Pye's review for Foreign Affairs characterized it as "history on a grand scale but with intimate details", lauding it for making "vivid the full dimensions of China's greatest centuries." Denis Sinor, writing for The Historian, felt that the book's coverage of fine arts was lacking but nevertheless praised the way it used political history as a backdrop for many other subjects, such as economics and religious philosophy, and wrote that Mote "deserves our gratitude for assembling, to our benefit, this vast material."
