= Asiatic mode of production =

Mode of production theory

The theory of the Asiatic mode of production (AMP) was devised by Karl Marx around the early 1850s. The essence of the theory has been described as "[the] suggestion ... that Asiatic societies were held in thrall by a despotic ruling clique, residing in central cities and directly expropriating surplus from largely autarkic and generally undifferentiated village communities".

In his articles on India written between 1852 and 1858, Marx outlined some of the basic characteristics of the AMP that prevailed in India. In these articles he indicated the absence of private ownership of land (self-sustaining units or communes), the unity between agriculture and manufacturing (handloom, spinning wheel), the absence of strong commodity production and exchange, and the stabilising role of Indian society and culture against invasions, conquests, and famines.

The theory continues to arouse heated discussion among contemporary Marxists and non-Marxists alike. Some have rejected the whole concept on the grounds that the socio-economic formations of pre-capitalist Asia did not differ enough from those of feudal Europe to warrant special designation. Aside from Marx, Friedrich Engels also focused on the AMP. In the 1920s, Soviet authors strongly debated about the use of the term. Some completely rejected it. Others, Soviet experts on China referred to as "Aziatchiki", suggested that Chinese land ownership structures had once resembled the AMP, but they were accused of Trotskyism and discussion of AMP was effectively banned in the USSR from 1931 until the Khrushchev period.

== Principles ==
Marx's theory focuses on the organization of labour. He distinguishes:

- means or forces of production—items such as land, natural resources, tools, human skills and knowledge—that are required for the production of socially useful goods; and
- relations of production, which are the social relationships formed as human beings are bound together in the processes of production of socially useful goods.

Together these compose a mode of production. Marx then distinguishes historical eras in terms of distinct predominant modes of production. In the Preface of A Contribution to the Critique of Political Economy, he writes: "In broad outline, the Asiatic, ancient, feudal and modern bourgeois modes of production may be designated as epochs marking progress in the economic development of society".

Marx and Engels emphasize that the role the state played in Asiatic societies was dominant, which was accounted for by the state's monopoly of land ownership, its sheer political and military power, or its control over irrigation systems. The classical forms of slavery as existed in Europe were entirely absent in these societies. Marx further distinguished the Asiatic production forms from all other pre-capitalist production forms:

Amidst oriental despotism and the propertylessness which seems legally to exist there, this clan or communal property exists in fact as the foundation, created mostly by a combination of manufactures and agriculture within the small commune ... A part of their surplus labor belongs to the higher community, which exists ultimately as a person, and this surplus labor takes the form of tribute etc., as well as of common labor for the exaltation of the unity, partly of the real despot, partly of the imagined clan-being, the god.

In Das Kapital he wrote that the "simplicity of the [Asiatic] productive organism ... supplies the key to the riddle of the unchangeability of Asiatic societies, which is in such striking contrast with the constant dissolution and refounding of Asiatic states, and the never-ceasing changes of dynasty. The structure of the fundamental economic elements of society remains untouched by the storms which blow up in the cloudy regions of politics".

== Criticism ==
The Asiatic mode of production has been the subject of much discussion by both Marxist and non-Marxist commentators. The AMP is the most disputed mode of production outlined in the works of Marx and Engels. Questions regarding the validity of the concept of the AMP were raised in terms of whether or not it corresponds to the reality of certain given societies. Historians have questioned the value of the notion of the AMP as an interpretation of the "facts" of Indian or Chinese history. The theory was rejected in the Soviet Union in the 1930s.

Karl August Wittfogel suggested in his 1957 book, Oriental Despotism: A Comparative Study of Total Power, that his concept of Oriental despotism showed that this was because of the similarity between the AMP and the reality of Stalin's Russia; he saw the authoritarian nature of communism as an extension of the need of totalitarian rule to control water in "the Orient".

Marxist historians such as John Haldon and Chris Wickham have argued that societies interpreted by Marx as examples of the AMP are better understood as Tributary Modes of Production (TMP). The TMP is characterized as having a "state class" as its specific form of ruling class, which has exclusive or almost exclusive rights to extract surplus from peasants over whom, however, it does not exercise tenurial control.

== See also ==
- Barracks communism
- Hydraulic empire
- Oriental despotism
