= Eduard Alexander =

German politician (1881–1945)

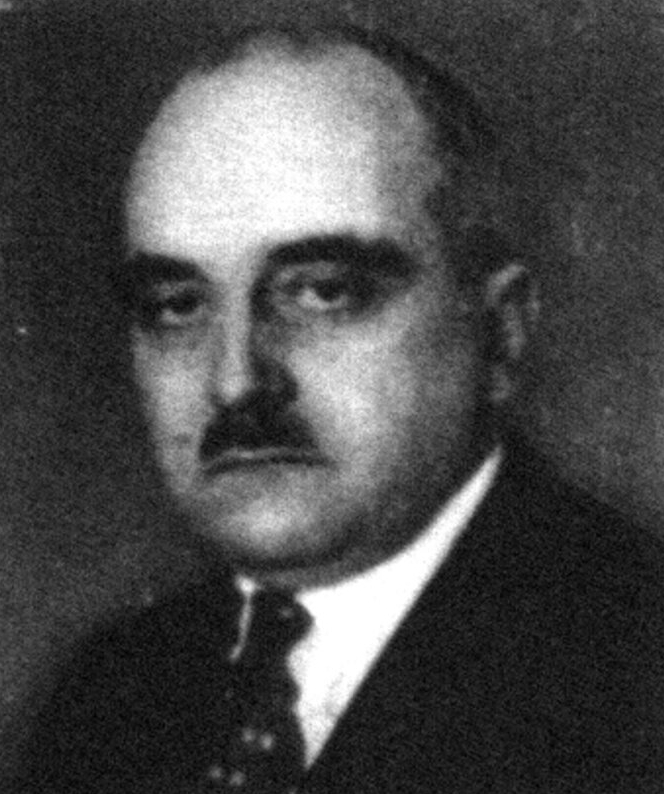
- Alexander c. 1928

Member of the Reichstag for Reichswahlvorschlag
- In office 1 July 1928 – 13 October 1930
- Preceded by: Multi-member district
- Succeeded by: Multi-member district

Personal details
- Born: 14 March 1881 Essen, Rhine Province, Kingdom of Prussia, German Empire
- Died: 1 March 1945 (aged 63) In transit to Bergen-Belsen concentration camp, Province of Hanover, Free State of Prussia, Nazi Germany
- Party: Communist Party of Germany
- Spouse(s): Gertrud Alexander (m. 1908, divorced) Maria Seyring (m. 1929)
- Profession: Politician; Economist; Lawyer

Eduard Ludwig Alexander (14 March 1881 – 1 March 1945, also known as Eduard Louis Alexander and Eduard Ludwig) was a German politician of the Communist Party (KPD) and a representative in the Reichstag.

== Career ==
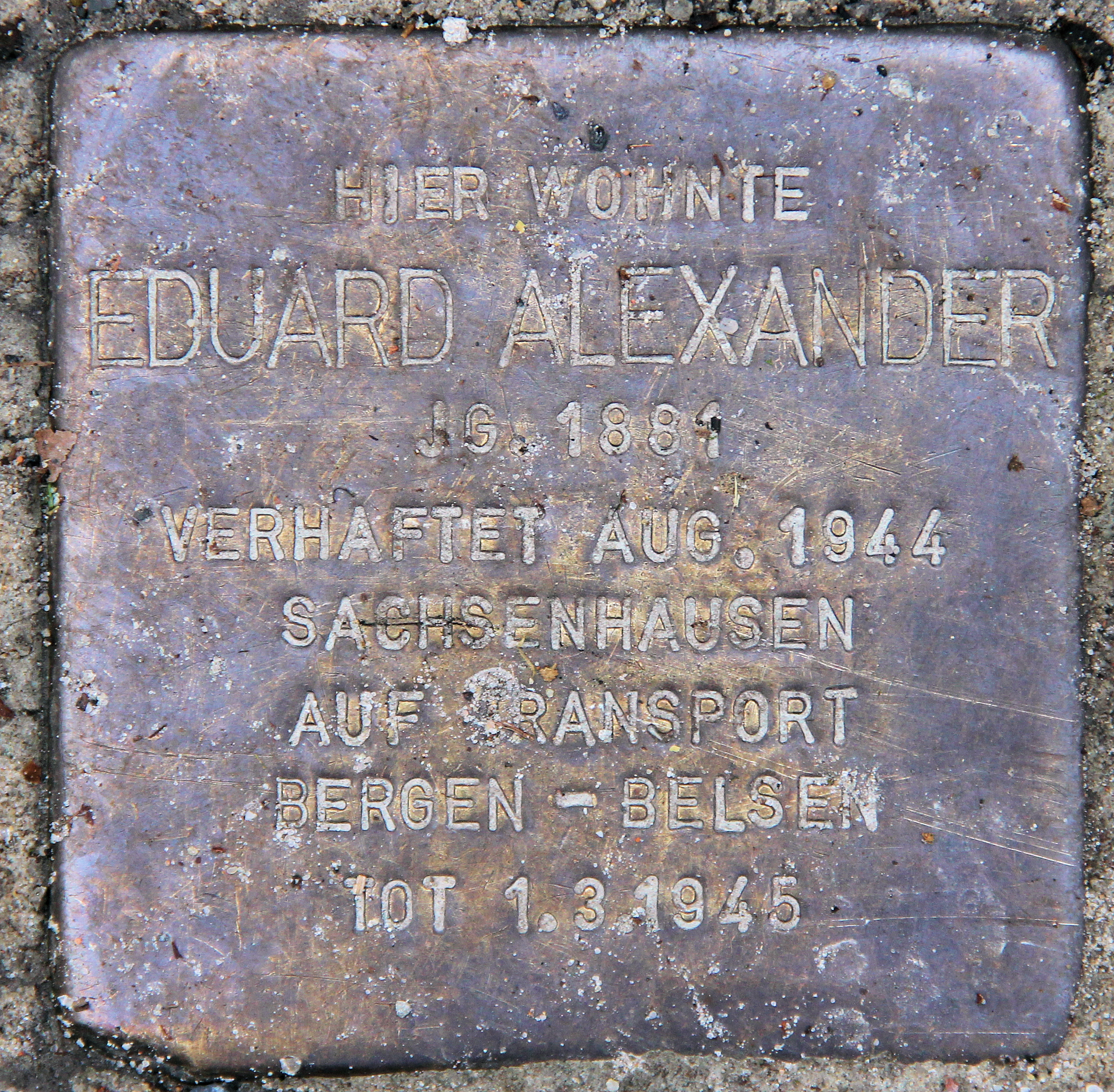
Stolperstein in front of Alexander's former home, Cimbernstraße 13, in Berlin-Nikolassee

Eduard Ludwig Alexander was born in Essen in the Prussian Rhine Province (now North Rhine-Westphalia); his father was an office manager. He attended the Royal Gymnasium at Burgplatz zu Essen, where he received his Abitur in 1900. He then studied at the Humboldt University of Berlin, at the Albert Ludwig University of Freiburg, and at the Université de Lausanne Jura, working from 1911 as a Rechtsanwalt and Justiziar in Berlin.

In 1917 Alexander was involved in the formation of the Spartacus League and joined the Communist Party of Germany (KPD) together with his wife upon the founding of the party in the Communist Party in 1918 and 1919. Between 1921 and 1925, he was a city councillor in Berlin while simultaneously serving, under the pseudonym Eduard Ludwig, as head of the press service of the KPD and financial editor of Die Rote Fahne.

At Pentecost in 1923, he and his wife Gertrud participated in the Marxist Work Week (Marxistische Arbeitswoche) and founded the Frankfurt Institute for Social Research. In 1927 he was a co-founder of the Marxist Workers' School, where he taught with Hermann Duncker, Jürgen Kuczynski, Georg Lukács and Karl August Wittfogel among others.

In the 1928 election, Alexander was elected to the Reichstag, but was not allowed to run in the 1930 election as a member of the so-called Conciliator faction.

In 1931, he was elected mayor of the city of Boizenburg with the support of both the KPD and SPD, but was not able to assume office due to a breakdown of the party alliance.

Following the Nazi rise to power in 1933, Alexander was disbarred on the grounds that he was allegedly half-Jewish. Later the same year, he was appointed as an arbitrator for trade affairs of the German-Russian trading association.

On 22 August 1944, Eduard Ludwig Alexander was arrested as part of the "Aktion Gitter" campaign and transferred to Sachsenhausen concentration camp. He died in transit to Bergen-Belsen concentration camp on 1 March 1945.

== Personal life ==
In 1902, he met Gertrud Gaudin (1882–1967), who at that time was graduating from art studies in Berlin. They married in 1908; under her married name Gertrud Alexander was later known as a communist politician, author, publicist and cultural critic. They divorced in the 1920s and in 1925 she moved to Moscow with both of their children.

In 1929 he married Maria Seyring, a physician, with whom he had three children.

== Memorials ==
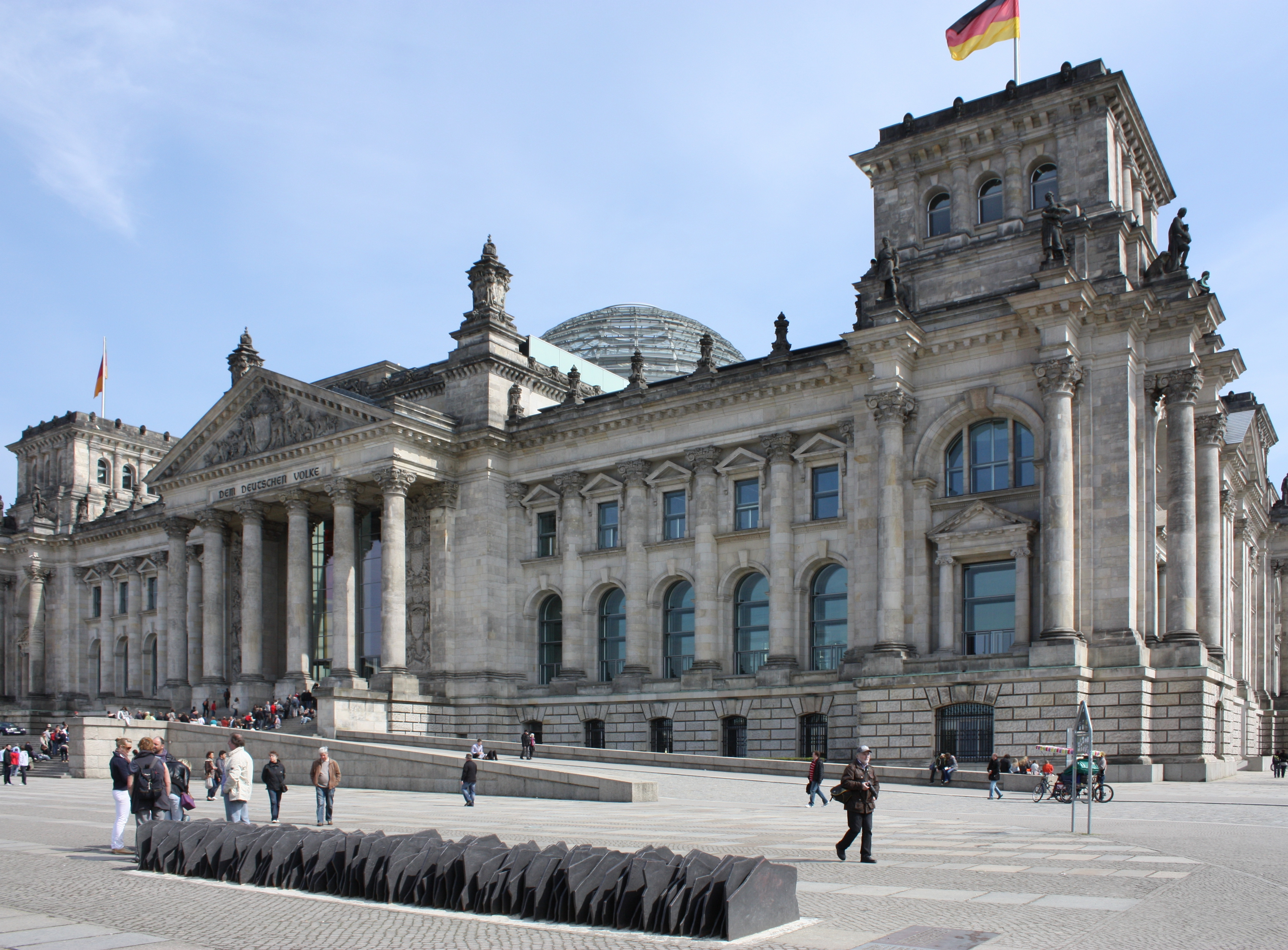
Memorial plaque at the Reichstag

In Berlin since 1992, Alexander's name appears on one of the 96 plaques in the Memorial to the Murdered Members of the Reichstag, on the corner of Scheidemannstraße / Republic Square in Berlin near the Reichstag building.

In March 2009, in front of Alexander's former residence at Cimbernstraße 13 in the Steglitz-Zehlendorf – Nikolassee district of Berlin, a Stolperstein was laid in his memory.

== Works ==
- Eduard Ludwig: Changes in German Foreign Trade. In: The International - Journal of Practice and Theory of Marxism, Volume 1922. Volume 3. Verlag Neue Kritik, Frankfurt 1971.
- Eduard Ludwig: Gold, money and paper. A reply to the money theory Vargas. In: The International - Journal of Practice and Theory of Marxism, Volume 1923. Volume 4. Verlag Neue Kritik, Frankfurt 1971.

== Literature ==
- Erwin Dickhoff: Essener Köpfe – wer war was? Bracht, Essen 1985, ISBN 3-87034-037-1.
- H. Mayer: Eduard Alexander – ein bedeutender Wirtschaftstheoretiker der KPD. In: Beiträge zur Geschichte der Arbeiterbewegung. Jg. 27, Nr. 1, 1985, S. 65ff.
- Hermann Weber, Andreas Herbst: Deutsche Kommunisten. Biographisches Handbuch 1918 bis 1945. Dietz, Berlin 2004, ISBN 3-320-02044-7, S. 58–59. Online
- Uwe Wieben: Eduard Alexander. Biographische Skizze eines nahezu vergessenen Politikers der Weimarer Republik, 159 Seiten, verlag am park Berlin 2008, ISBN 978-3-89793-166-4.
