= Oriental despotism =

Political concept that Asian countries tend to be more authoritarian

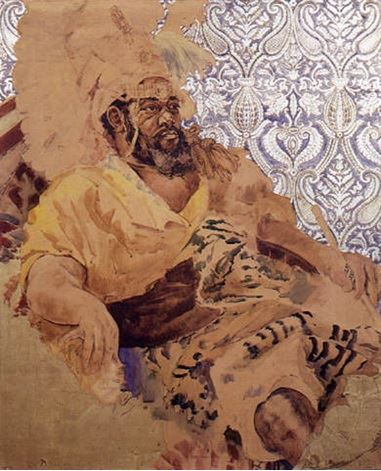
Oriental potentate by Charles Toché

Oriental despotism refers to the Western view of Asian societies as politically or morally more susceptible to despotic rule, and therefore different from the democratic West. The term is often associated with Karl August Wittfogel's 1957 book Oriental Despotism, although this work primarily focusses on hydraulic empires.

First articulated explicitly by Aristotle, who contrasted the perceived natural freedom of Greeks with the alleged servitude of Persians and other "barbarian" peoples, the concept was developed extensively in European thought during the Enlightenment. Notably, Montesquieu, in his influential Spirit of the Laws (1748), defined Oriental despotism as a distinct type of governance based on absolute power concentrated in the hands of a single ruler, maintained through fear rather than law or tradition.

Throughout the 18th and 19th centuries, the idea of Oriental despotism served both as a theoretical explanation of supposed Eastern political stagnation and as a rhetorical justification for Western colonial and imperial ventures. It evolved further within Marxist thought as part of the "Asiatic mode of production," depicting Asian civilizations as economically stagnant due to centralized control over land and irrigation. In the mid-20th century, Karl Wittfogel's book Oriental Despotism (1957) controversially revived the concept, applying it critically to communist states like the USSR and China, describing their centralized bureaucratic control as modern forms of ancient despotic governance.

Today, the term "Oriental despotism" is widely recognized as Eurocentric, discredited by some contemporary scholarship that emphasizes its ideological underpinnings rooted in colonialism and Orientalist stereotypes. Nevertheless, the concept remains historically significant for understanding Western perceptions of Eastern political institutions, and continues to influence debates about authoritarian governance, East-West distinctions, and post-colonial critiques of historical narratives.

== Classical and early modern origins ==
The concept of "Oriental despotism" first took shape in classical antiquity as a way for Greeks to contrast their own political ethos with that of the "barbarian" East. In Aristotle's Politics (4th century BCE), despotic monarchy was defined as the absolute rule of a master over slaves, a form of monarchy legitimate and hereditary among those who supposedly accepted servitude, unlike tyranny which was illegitimate rule over the unwilling. Aristotle explicitly theorized that while Greeks, by their nature, would not tolerate absolute domination for long, certain non-Greek peoples (exemplified by the Persians) were "by nature" inclined to obey one all-powerful ruler. Despotism, in this view, was natural and even stable among "barbarous" nations but alien to the freedom-loving Greeks. This Greek stereotype of Asiatic peoples as natural slaves underpinned a lasting dichotomy: the "Oriental" world was cast as inherently despotic, opposed to the liberty and civic life of the West. Ancient writers from Aeschylus to Isocrates had already portrayed the Persian Great King as an autocrat over slavish subjects, and Aristotle's theory codified this into political philosophy, making "Oriental despotism" a byword for the antithesis of Greek polity.

Throughout late antiquity and the medieval era, this idea persisted and evolved. After Aristotle's works were rediscovered in medieval Europe, scholastic thinkers like Thomas Aquinas and Marsilius of Padua renewed the Aristotelian notion that certain Eastern realms were naturally suited to despotic rule. By the early modern period, European observers applied the term to contemporary empires. Machiavelli in 1513 (though not using the word "despotism") distinguished the Ottoman "state of slaves" (an absolutist sultanate with no intermediate nobility) from the more pluralistic monarchies of Europe. He noted that a regime like Ottoman Turkey, where the prince held all authority directly, was hard to conquer but easy to hold, whereas a European kingdom with powerful lords was the opposite: an analysis underscoring fundamental East-West differences in governance.

Political theorist Jean Bodin systematized these contrasts in the late 16th century. Bodin described a type of sovereignty he called monarchie seigneuriale (seignorial or lordly monarchy) in which the ruler's power over subjects was absolute and "limitless, similar to that of a master over slaves". Although Bodin did not use the word "despotism" explicitly, he cited the Ottoman Empire as the prime example: a government where no private property or fundamental law existed to restrain the sovereign, who was sole owner of all land and goods. This he distinguished from a monarchie royale (royal/legitimate monarchy) like France, where property rights, divine and natural laws, and customary legal limits tempered absolutism. Bodin attributed Oriental-style limitless monarchy not to any innate ethnic trait (as Aristotle had) but to historical circumstance: conquest and subjugation in the wake of war. In his view, despotic monarchy was the oldest and most primitive form of regime, capable of long stability, and not confined to Asia: even Charles V's Spanish colonial empire could be seen as despotic since it arose from conquest and lacked traditional checks. Bodin's formulation thus broadened "Oriental despotism" into a trans-historical category of absolute conquest-states, while reinforcing the notion that the Ottoman sultan's rule was fundamentally different from European kingship.

Travelers and missionaries of the 16th and 17th centuries further cemented the concept with empirical detail. Works like Giovanni Botero's Relazioni universali (1590s) collated reports of Eastern courts and generalized that many Asiatic kingdoms, from Ottoman Turkey and Safavid Persia to Mughal India, China, and Siam, shared a despotic character. This marked an important expansion of the idea beyond the Ottoman example, applying a single model of absolutism across the diverse "Orient". François Bernier, a French physician in Mughal India in the 1660s, gave one of the classic accounts: he depicted the Mughal Empire as tyrannically administered, with crushing taxation, no secure private property, and a stark gulf between an all-powerful emperor and the impoverished populace. Bernier argued that the absence of hereditary land rights and the caprice of officials led to economic ruin – a critique that would heavily influence European views of India as the paradigm of oriental misrule. Similarly, Jean Chardin's travels in Safavid Persia (1670s) described an autocratic state where historical contingencies (like the need to suppress an aristocracy) had concentrated extreme power in the Shah's hands. Chardin notably downplayed cultural or religious explanations: he observed that Persian and Turkish governments differed despite both being Islamic, and concluded that "oriental despotism" took varied forms depending on local circumstances. Such first-hand reports, while sometimes tempering sweeping theories, generally confirmed Europeans' belief that in Asia the ruler's will was law and customary liberties were absent. By 1700, the image of vast Eastern empires ruled by capricious, all-controlling despots, in contrast to Europe's evolving legal-constitutional orders, was firmly established in the Western imagination.

== Enlightenment theories and debates ==
The 18th-century Enlightenment made "Oriental despotism" a central concept in political thought. Thinkers of this era used the idea both to analyze Asian governance and to draw contrasts highlighting (or questioning) Europe's superiority. The seminal figure was Charles-Louis de Montesquieu, whose Persian Letters (1721) and Spirit of the Laws (1748) gave the classic Enlightenment definition of oriental despotism. Montesquieu argued that of the three basic types of government (republics, monarchies, and despotisms) all Asian societies fell into the despotic category. In his taxonomy, a despotism was not merely an abusive monarchy but a distinct form of rule: it was a polity in which one individual holds all power, law is the ruler's whim, and subjects are treated as passive slaves with no liberty. Crucially, Montesquieu treated this as a system with its own internal logic and stability, not just a degenerated European monarchy. He sought to explain why despotism predominated across the Orient, examining factors from climate to religion. In Spirit of the Laws, Montesquieu famously posited that the vast, fertile plains of Asia and its warm climates facilitated centralized control and pervasive fear, whereas Europe's cooler climate and fragmented geography bred liberty and moderation. He identified "intimidation" as the principle of despotism (rule by fear) in contrast to honor in monarchies or virtue in republics. Montesquieu also linked political absolutism with social and cultural conditions: for example, he argued that Islam, by uniting spiritual and temporal authority, was an "ally" of despotism (though he acknowledged religion could sometimes restrain a despot by imposing moral rules).

Despite its negative judgment, Montesquieu's analysis was empirical and comparative for its time. He drew heavily on travel literature (citing sources like Bernier and Chardin) to catalogue variations in Oriental governments. For instance, he noted that Persia's succession of despotisms differed from China's stable bureaucratic autocracy, yet in his view both shared the essential quality of power without check. Asia, in his view, was the natural home of despotism, a vast milieu where geography and history conspired to keep societies stagnant under arbitrary rule. Europe, by contrast, was presented as uniquely disposed to freedom, though Montesquieu did warn that even European states might lapse into despotism under certain conditions (for example, if a monarch extended his realm too far and eroded intermediate institutions, a scenario he feared in his own era). Published to great acclaim, Spirit of the Laws made Oriental despotism a standard lens through which Enlightenment Europe viewed the East. Montesquieu's influence ensured that late 18th-century political theory assumed a basic opposition: Occident = moderate government under law, Orient = unchecked despotic power.

Not all philosophes agreed on the causes or even the existence of such a stark East-West divide, and the concept sparked lively debate. Voltaire, for example, admired certain Asian civilizations and accused Montesquieu of misreading his sources. In a rebuttal, Voltaire argued that real Eastern states like Ottoman Turkey did not fit Montesquieu's caricature. Drawing on empirical observation, he claimed there were laws and constraints in Muslim kingdoms and that Montesquieu had conjured a theoretical despotism that had no matches in history. Other critics with firsthand expertise bolstered this view: the orientalist Abraham-Hyacinthe Anquetil-Duperron, who had lived in India and Persia, published Législation Orientale (1778) to refute the notion that Oriental rulers were entirely above the law or that private property was absent in Asia. Anquetil showed, for instance, that the Mughal and Persian empires had legal codes and recognized property rights, thereby directly challenging the stereotype of an omnipotent Asiatic monarch owning everything and everyone. Such critiques were motivated not only by scholarly accuracy but also by contemporary politics: as European colonial interests in places like India grew, there was an urgent need to understand Asian systems on their own terms, rather than dismiss them as mere despotisms. Anquetil warned that glibly labeling India despotic insulted a complex civilization, especially at a time when France and Britain were vying for influence there.

Meanwhile, other Enlightenment writers took Montesquieu's thesis in different directions. Nicolas-Antoine Boulanger's Recherches sur l'origine du despotisme oriental (1761) concurred that Asiatic despotism was real, but rooted it firmly in theocracy (a word coined in that work): he argued that priestly authority and "mystification" of the masses through religion were the ultimate basis of despots' power. Boulanger thus shifted emphasis away from climate and toward religion as the engine of Oriental absolute rule, reflecting the broader anti-clerical spirit of the Enlightenment (using "Asiatic tyranny" as a veiled critique of European churchly domination as well). Helvétius and others echoed Boulanger in doubting geography as destiny; they saw despotism as a political construct, often buttressed by superstition, rather than a simple outgrowth of environment. At the Enlightenment's end, Condorcet in his Sketch for a Historical Picture of Progress (c.1794) gave the idea a humanitarian revolutionary twist: he portrayed Orient vs. Occident in stark moral terms and urged "enlightened" European nations to emancipate the peoples subjected to Oriental despotism, whom he saw as trapped in oppression and stagnation. This was an early articulation of what would later be called the "civilizing mission", using the trope of despotic East to justify Western intervention as a benevolent duty.

Notably, China occupied a special place in Enlightenment discussions. The French physiocrats (economic philosophers) admired China's agrarian bureaucracy and, rather counter-intuitively, held it up as a model of "good" despotism. François Quesnay's essay Despotisme de la Chine (1767) argued that the Chinese emperor's rule was effectively constrained by rational laws and Confucian moral order, making it a benevolent autocracy quite unlike the arbitrary despotisms elsewhere. The physiocrats coined the term "legal despotism" or "despotism of evidence", suggesting that an enlightened absolute ruler following natural law could achieve social harmony and prosperity. They thus offered a rare positive re-imagining of Oriental despotism, leveraging Jesuit reports of China's stable governance to argue that strong central authority was not always tyrannical but could be virtuous and economically beneficial. This sinophilic strand stood in contrast to Montesquieu's largely negative schema, highlighting that Enlightenment thought about the East was diverse: some saw Asia's autocrats as despised symbols of backwardness, others as exemplars of orderly paternalistic rule.

By the late 18th century, "Oriental despotism" had become a commonplace of Western discourse, so much so that it even bounced back on Europe's own self-analysis. French critics of absolutism, during and after Louis XIV's reign, routinely compared their king to an "Oriental despot" and France to a Persia or Turkey in bondage. Montesquieu's Persian Letters itself satirized French society through the eyes of Persian visitors, implicitly likening Louis XIV's centralized state to an oriental court. In Britain's imperial debates, too, the trope was invoked: figures like Edmund Burke lambasted misrule in British India by warning that Europeans were descending to the level of oriental despots in their treatment of Indians. As colonial administrators gained direct experience in Asia, they sometimes took the concept literally, with significant consequences: British officials in late 18th-century India, imbued with the idea that the Mughal system was one of absolutism without private land ownership, implemented reforms (such as the Permanent Settlement of Bengal in 1793) to create secure property rights, hoping to remedy "oriental" defects. This policy of treating zamindars (revenue landlords) as English-style proprietors was a direct application of Enlightenment political theory, and it backfired, causing economic disruption and social dislocation. The episode vividly demonstrated how the European idea of Oriental despotism, when imposed as a template on Eastern societies, could misjudge native institutions and produce unintended results. Thus by 1800 the concept was not merely academic: it underpinned real strategies of governance and justified both liberal reforms and imperial domination in the non-Western world.

== 19th-century evolutionary frameworks and Marxist theory ==
Around the turn of the 19th century, the notion of Oriental despotism was absorbed into new grand theories of historical development. Enlightenment universalism gave way to evolutionary or stadial thinking, and many writers placed despotism as an early stage in humanity's political progression. Late Enlightenment and German Idealist philosophers, such as Immanuel Kant, J. G. Herder, and above all G. W. F. Hegel, repackaged the East-West dichotomy in a developmental schema. Kant, for example, described some Asian states (like China) as static despotic regimes and voiced a growing Sinophobia in German thought, suggesting that China's supposedly unchanging absolutism illustrated a lack of progress. Herder associated the predominance of agriculture and settled village life in Asia with political stagnation and despotism, implying that societies pass through an "agricultural despotic" phase before higher forms of civic freedom emerge. These ideas fed into Hegel's influential philosophy of history (lectured 1820s), which placed "Oriental despotism" as the starting point of world-historical development. Hegel taught that the Oriental world was the "childhood of history": the first stage in the evolution of Spirit (Geist), where only one person (the emperor or sultan) is truly free and the rest have no individual autonomy. In Hegel's dialectic, history is the story of freedom gradually expanding, and in the Orient this process had barely begun. Despotic Asia, he argued, represented a society just out of the state of nature but not yet aware of personal rights; it was a homogeneous mass ruled by an absolute will. The consequence was political immobility: Hegel asserted that Eastern empires (China, India, Persia, etc.) were essentially static and extraneous to the true "development of Spirit," which moved westward to Greece, Rome, and ultimately the Germanic (European) world. "The History of the World travels from East to West," Hegel declared, for Europe is the end of history: the Orient, lacking internal dynamism, remained stuck in time. This schema reinforced an "inexorable connection between despotism and immobility", giving a philosophical rationale to the earlier Enlightenment judgment that Asia was fundamentally different and inferior in political terms. Hegel's prestige helped to canonize the idea that Oriental despotism implies absence of historical progress, a view that dovetailed with 19th-century imperial ideology (the White Man's Burden to bring progress to the stagnant East) and with European justifications of their global dominance.

The most significant adaptation of the concept in the 19th century came from the realm of political economy and Marxist theory. Karl Marx, while initially influenced by Hegel's constructs, reinterpreted Oriental despotism in materialist terms as part of his theory of the "Asiatic mode of production." Writing in the 1850s about India and China, Marx picked up long-noted features, such as the absence of private landownership and the village-based agrarian economy, and argued these formed a distinct socioeconomic system. In Marx's analysis, Oriental despotism was rooted in economic structure: because land was traditionally owned by the sovereign (or the community) rather than individuals, and villages were largely self-sufficient, a powerful centralized state was needed to coordinate large public works (especially irrigation) and to extract surplus from an otherwise stagnant rural society. This "Asiatic mode of production", characterized by communal villages, hydraulic agriculture, and state ownership of property, created a stable but stagnant social order. For Marx, it explained why great Asian civilizations had not undergone the same class-driven revolutions as Europe's and had remained frozen in a "primitive" phase of history. He explicitly linked the idea to despotism: the oriental mode of production, Marx wrote, was the material foundation that made an all-powerful despotic state both possible and necessary, fusing economic and political absolutism. This was essentially a secular, structural restatement of Montesquieu's old observation about irrigation and central power. Marx's prime examples were India and China, but he also extended the logic to "parts of Russia" and the Islamic world. In Marx's view, Asian despotic regimes, though often stable for centuries, represented a historical dead-end: a "block" to human progress that would eventually be shattered by external forces. Famously, Marx saw British colonial rule in India as performing a "double mission": it was violently destroying the stagnant Asiatic order, but in doing so it would lay the groundwork for a modern society and integration into capitalist progress. This judgment that colonialism, however brutal, was indirectly enabling India's regeneration out of Oriental despotism, illustrates how deeply the concept had permeated 19th-century European thought, even among its radical critics. Marx's formulation spurred extensive debate within socialist circles and academia, as it implied a unique path of development for Eastern societies. In late 19th-century Russia, for instance, intellectuals fiercely discussed whether their own Tsarist autocracy was an "Asiatic" despotism following an Asiatic mode of production or a feudal monarchy that could evolve like Western Europe. Russian "Westernizers" often invoked the concept to disparage Tsarism as a holdover of Mongol-style absolutism that must be overcome, while Slavophiles rejected that label, arguing Russia had its own distinct tradition. Thus, the Western concept of Oriental despotism was not only projected onto Russia by foreigners but was also actively contested within Russian thought, showing the term's provocative reach. Similarly, in the Ottoman Empire's late 19th-century reform era, some Ottoman intellectuals strove to counter European depictions of the Sultanate as hopelessly despotic, by highlighting constitutional moves and Islamic legal restraints that moderated the monarch's power. The idea of Oriental despotism became a yardstick in global political discourse: either a stigma to escape or a diagnosis to be embraced in calls for reform.

== Weber, Wittfogel, and Cold War revival ==
Entering the 20th century, academic interest in "Oriental despotism" waned somewhat as social science developed more nuanced frameworks. Yet key thinkers continued to revisit the idea, particularly in the context of explaining why the West industrialized and modernized while the East (supposedly) did not. Max Weber, the German sociologist, integrated the concept into his comparative studies of civilization. Weber analyzed ancient economies and argued that environmental and structural factors made Near Eastern and Asian societies develop powerful bureaucratic states that stifled individualism, unlike the city-states and feudal polities of Europe. Echoing older theories, Weber highlighted irrigation as a prime cause: in regions like Pharaonic Egypt or Mesopotamia, the need for large-scale water control led to centralized administrations and a "hydraulic bureaucracy" overseeing canals and flood management. "The crucial factor which made Near Eastern development so different was the need for irrigation systems," Weber wrote, which "demanded the existence of a unified bureaucracy". The result, in Weber's assessment, was the "subjugation of the individual" in Eastern cultures, whereas the Mediterranean world (Greece, in particular) benefited from a freer social environment and a purely secular civic life that enabled the rise of capitalism. He pointed to the patrimonial bureaucracy of Imperial China, characterized by a cadre of officials personally dependent on the emperor, as a model case where a tradition of centralized administration impeded the growth of autonomous cities, merchant classes, or legal-rational authority. Weber gave new scholarly respectability to the idea that Oriental political structures were inherently anti-progressive. By tying political forms to economic rationality, he supported the "European miracle" narrative: a unique combination of factors allowed the West to escape the trap of agrarian despotism and achieve modern capitalism. Weber's work thus revitalized the core notion of Oriental despotism in early 20th-century social science, helping frame the long history of Eastern polities as a contrast case that underscored European singularity.

It was not until the Cold War era, however, that "Oriental despotism" as a term made a dramatic comeback, and this was largely due to Karl August Wittfogel. Wittfogel was a German-American historian who in 1957 published Oriental Despotism: A Comparative Study of Total Power, the most famous modern work dedicated to the concept. Himself a former Marxist, Wittfogel broke with orthodox Soviet-friendly Marxism and used the idea of Oriental despotism as a weapon to criticize contemporary communist states. In this sweeping study, he built upon Marx and Weber to argue that "hydraulic civilizations" (societies dependent on large-scale irrigation and water works) tended to develop authoritarian bureaucratic governments he dubbed "oriental despotisms". According to Wittfogel's "hydraulic hypothesis," the technical requirements of managing irrigation in arid or flood-prone regions (like Egypt, Mesopotamia, India, China) led to the rise of an all-powerful centralized state apparatus; that bureaucracy, in turn, amassed control over both economy and society, resulting in totalitarian control of a kind unknown in the decentralized West. Wittfogel essentially formalized the idea of a distinctive non-Western path of civilization: unlike the feudal-to-capitalist trajectory of Europe, the Orient followed a "hydraulic-bureaucratic" path culminating in stagnant absolutist empires. He not only surveyed ancient Asian empires but provocatively argued that modern Communist regimes in China and the USSR were new incarnations of Oriental despotism. In his view, Marx had been shortsighted to see socialism as a leap forward. Wittfogel claimed the Communist Party-state under Stalin or Mao was structurally akin to the old despotic dynasties, simply with "industrial" means. He described Soviet Russia as a "monocentric" system akin to Asiatic monarchy, in contrast to the "polycentric" pluralism of Western societies. This thesis, arriving at the height of the Cold War, fed into the ideological narrative that communism represented an Asiatic-like tyranny antithetical to Western freedom.

Wittfogel's Oriental Despotism was both influential and controversial. Supporters praised its grand comparative sweep and the insight that environmental adaptation (irrigation) could shape political evolution. His work drew explicitly from the lineage of Montesquieu, Marx, and Weber, tying together climate, economic mode of production, and bureaucratic form into one grand explanation. However, many scholars, especially sinologists and anthropologists, criticized Wittfogel's claims as overly deterministic and empirically flawed. For example, Chinese history experts pointed out that not all major waterworks in China were state-run, that private property and local institutions did exist to significant degrees, and that the term "despotism" oversimplified the complex legal and moral restraints on imperial power. Historian Frederick W. Mote in 1961 famously attacked Wittfogel's thesis as misreading Chinese history, arguing that the growth of Chinese imperial power was not unchecked or unchanging and that the term "despotism" is a dubious fit for traditional Chinese rule. Likewise, British scientist-historian Joseph Needham, in reviewing Wittfogel, objected that applying a derogatory word like despotism, freighted with Western notions of arbitrary tyranny, distorted our understanding of how Confucian bureaucratic governance actually worked. These critiques were part of a broader mid-20th-century reassessment that warned against uncritical use of the old Orientalist tropes. Nonetheless, Wittfogel's book had a significant impact, especially outside of Asian studies. It kept alive the idea that there was a through-line from ancient Eastern empires to modern totalitarian states: an East-West divide in political culture that resonated with the geopolitics of the 1950s. Wittfogel's revival of "Oriental despotism" demonstrated the enduring allure of this historical concept, even as it was now being adapted to very contemporary debates about freedom and tyranny.

== Modern critiques and reframing ==
By the late 20th century, the concept of Oriental despotism came under sustained attack from new intellectual currents, notably post-colonial studies and revisionist historiography. Scholars in these fields argued that "Oriental despotism" was less a neutral analytical model and more a Eurocentric myth that said more about Western self-justification than about Asian realities. In his landmark 1978 book Orientalism, Edward Said identified the trope of the "Oriental despot" as a key element of Western imaginings of the East: a stereotype of "the arbitrary power of Asiatic princes" used to portray Eastern societies as stagnant, cruel, and inferior. Said and those influenced by him showed how this image had served as an ideological tool of colonial domination, rationalizing European imperial rule as bringing law and liberty to benighted peoples. From Montesquieu's climate theories to Marx's evolutionary schema and Wittfogel's Cold War polemic, the through-line was a claim of Western superiority and Eastern backwardness. Modern scholarship has been intent on deconstructing these claims. Researchers have highlighted, for example, the constitutional and consultative traditions within Ottoman and Mughal governance, or the civic institutions in Qing China, which contradict the caricature of entirely unchecked tyranny. They note that terms like "despot" were often pejorative labels affixed by outsiders rather than accepted descriptions by insiders.

In regions once dubbed "oriental despotisms," local reformers and intellectuals had long contested the characterization. In the 19th century, Asian and Middle Eastern thinkers increasingly engaged with Western political ideas and offered their own perspectives: Ottoman constitutionalists argued the Sultan's power should be limited by shari'a and a parliament (hardly a concession to being "natural despots"), Indian nationalists pointed out that pre-colonial India had village self-governance and traditions of consultation, and Chinese reformers in the late Qing and Republican eras strove to show that China could modernize its monarchy or establish a republic, escaping the "Oriental despotic" mold that Westerners ascribed to it. These indigenous debates underscore that "Oriental despotism" was never a self-image, but a contentious external judgment: one that those so labeled often resisted or sought to disprove.

Within Western academia, the late 20th century brought a more critical historiography. Influenced by the "global history" and post-colonial turns, scholars argue that the concept's theoretical force has essentially vanished today. Comparative historians have moved away from rigid East-West dichotomies and instead emphasize economic and cultural connections, indigenous agency, and the diversity of political forms in Asia. For instance, economic historian B. J. O'Leary (1989) revisited the Marxian debates on the Asiatic mode and found them wanting, suggesting that Indian history did not fit a unilinear despotic model and that colonialism's impact was more complex. Area specialists continue to dismantle monolithic notions: Ottoman studies reveal a negotiated system of provincial governance and law (far from an omnipotent Sultan free of constraints), while Sinology has shown that Qing emperors operated within a framework of Confucian norms and had to earn the "Mandate of Heaven" by just rule: concepts incompatible with pure arbitrary despotism. Furthermore, anthropologists studying irrigation-based communities found that "hydraulic societies" did not always lead to centralization: small-scale local management was often the norm, undermining Wittfogel's deterministic link between water and authoritarianism.

At the same time, some modern analysts caution that in dismissing "Oriental despotism" entirely, one should not ignore the real patterns of authoritarian governance in many historical Asian states. There remains debate on how to balance recognizing Orientalism's exaggerations with acknowledging that, for example, the Chinese imperial state or Mughal state were more centralized and autocratic in certain respects than contemporaneous European polities. Critics of Said have argued he downplayed the genuine history and function of despotism as a regime type by focusing solely on Western representations. They point out that concepts akin to "despotism" existed in Asian political thought too (for example, Chinese political theory condemned "bao jun" 暴君 (tyrannical rulers) and praised enlightened monarchs who ruled by moral law). Thus the scholarly conversation has shifted to a more nuanced ground: moving beyond the simplistic East-vs-West trope, researchers examine each society's own political idioms and power structures. The term "Oriental despotism" itself, however, is now mostly used in historical context, as an object of study (how and why Western thinkers conceived this idea) rather than as a reliable analytic category.

== See also ==
- Asian values
- Asiatic mode of production
- Hydraulic empire
- Tsarist absolutism
