= Karl August Wittfogel =

German sinologist and historian

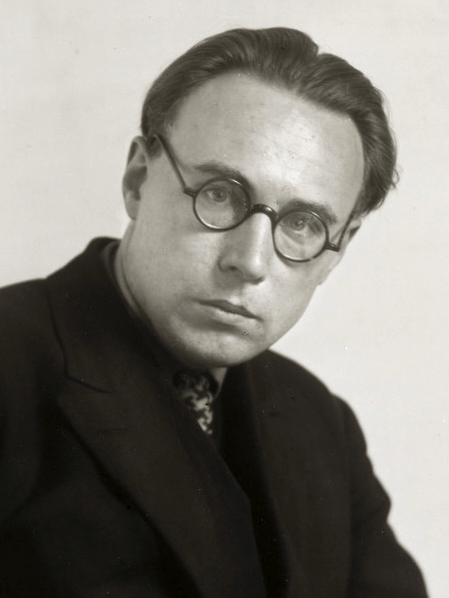
- Wittfogel (1926) by August Sander
- Born: September 6, 1896; Woltersdorf, Lüchow, Province of Hanover, Kingdom of Prussia, German Empire
- Died: May 25, 1988 (aged 91); St. Luke's–Roosevelt Hospital Center, Manhattan, New York City, US
- Occupations: Playwright, historian, and sinologist

Academic background
- Education: Leipzig University

Academic work
- Institutions: Columbia University; University of Washington
- Notable works: Oriental Despotism: A Comparative Study of Total Power

Karl August Wittfogel (German: [ˈvɪtfoːɡl̩]; 6 September 1896 – 25 May 1988) was a German-American historian, sinologist, and playwright. He was originally a Marxist and an active member of the Communist Party of Germany, but after the Second World War, he was an equally fierce anticommunist.

== Life and career ==
Karl August Wittfogel was born 6 September 1896 at Woltersdorf, in Lüchow, Province of Hanover, to a Lutheran schoolteacher. Wittfogel left school in 1914. He studied philosophy, history, sociology, geography at Leipzig University and also in Munich, Berlin and Rostock and in 1919 again in Berlin. From 1921 he studied sinology in Leipzig. In between Wittfogel was drafted into a Signal Corps Unit (Fernmeldeeinheit) in 1917.

In 1921 Wittfogel married Rose Schlesinger. Wittfogel's second wife was Olga (Joffe) Lang, a Russian sociologist who traveled with him to China and collaborated with him on a project to analyze the Chinese family. Lang later published a monograph on the Chinese family and a biography of the anarchist writer, Ba Jin. The anthropologist Esther Schiff Goldfrank became Wittfogel's third wife in 1940. Wittfogel held academic positions at Columbia University from 1939 and was professor for Chinese history at the University of Washington from 1947 to 1966. In his 1949 revisionist history of the Liao dynasty (916–1125) he coined the term "conquest dynasty" referring to a Chinese dynasty established by non-Han ethnicities in China proper. He died of pneumonia on May 25, 1988, at St. Luke's-Roosevelt Hospital Center in Manhattan.

=== Politics ===
Before the First World War, Wittfogel was the leader of the Lüneburg Wandervogel group. In 1918, he set up the Lüneburg local. Many years later Wittfogel was to publish an account of these youth movements under the pseudonym "Jungmann" in Max Horkheimer's compilation "Studies in Authority and the Family." He played a leading role in the Socialist Student Party after the German Revolution. He worked alongside Hans Reichenbach and ran an introductory course on "What is Socialism". He joined the Independent Social Democratic Party of Germany (USPD). At the Meißnertag 1923, a large Youth Movement gathering, Wittfogel asked the members of the Freideutsche Jugend whether they knew the need of the age, its big idea and whether they had what it takes to die for their convictions. After expelling the Communist Workers' Party of Germany (KAPD) in the autumn of 1919, the KPD was significantly reduced in numbers, until a majority of USPD delegates decided to join it at their party convention in October 1920. Wittfogel was amongst the third of USPD members (ca. 300,000) who joined the 70,000-strong KPD.

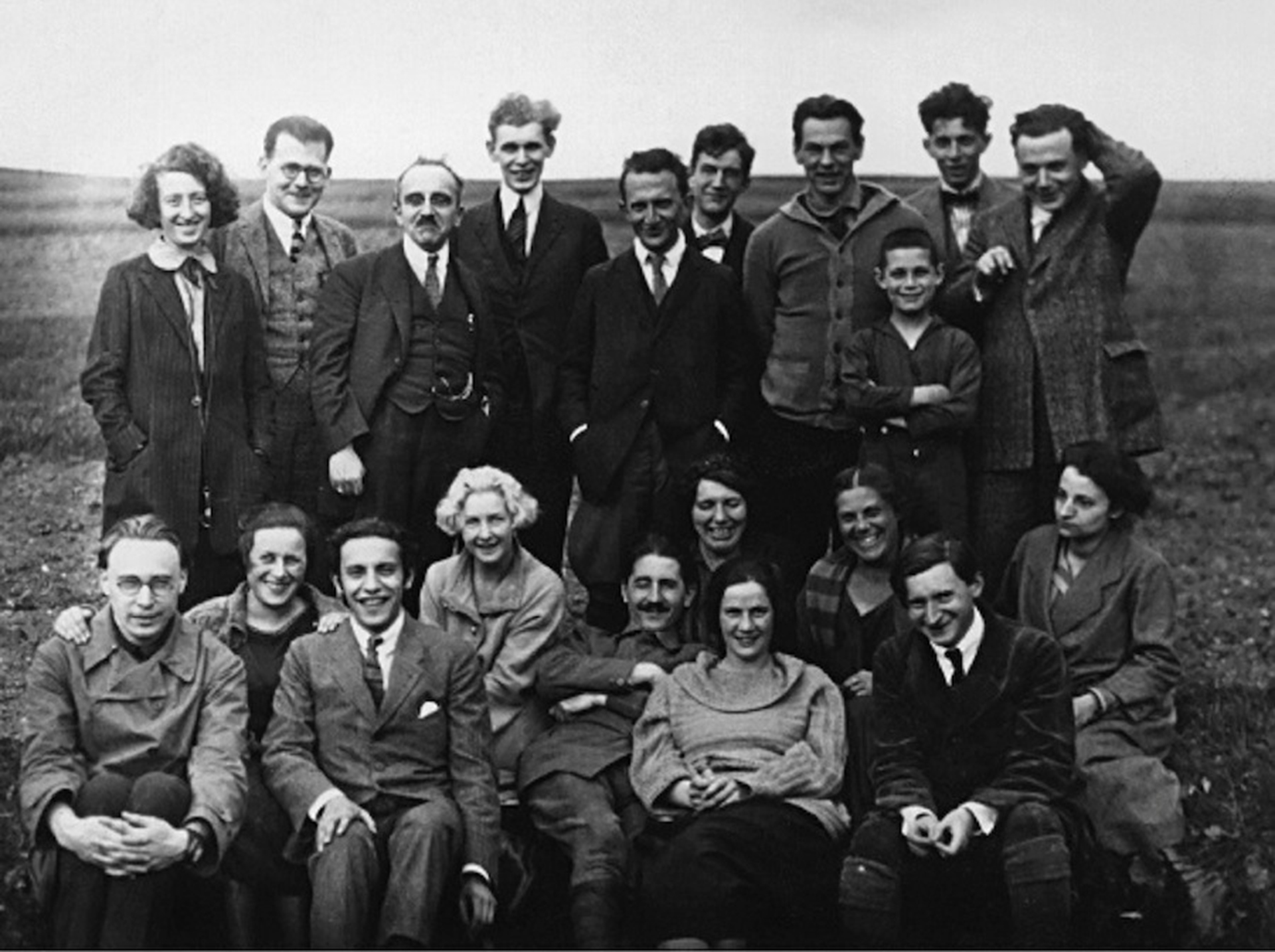
Institute for Social Research planning meeting Geraberg 1 May 1923): Hede Massing, Friedrich Pollock, Edward Alexander Ludwig, Konstantin Zetkin, Georg Lukács, Julian Gumperz, Richard Sorge, Karl Alexander (child), Felix Weil, unknown; sitting: Karl August Wittfogel, Rose Wittfogel, unknown, Christiane Sorge, Karl Korsch, Hedda Korsch, Käthe Weil, Margarete Lissauer, Bela Fogarasi, Gertrud Alexander

Wittfogel met Karl Korsch in 1920 and was invited to the 1923 conference that helped establish the Institute for Social Research. Felix Weil financed and Richard Sorge organized this Erste Marxistische Arbeitswoche (1st marxist workweek) with Karl Korsch and Hedda Korsch, Georg Lukács, Béla Fogarasi, his later wife Margarete Lissauer, Félix José Weil and Käthe Weil (they were married 1921–1929), Richard and Christiane Sorge, Friedrich Pollock, Julian Gumperz and his later wife Hede Massing, from 1919 to 1923 married to Gerhart Eisler, Konstantin Zetkin, Fukumoto Kazuo, Eduard Ludwig Alexander and Gertrud Alexander, their child, and others. Rose Wittfogel, born Schlesinger, also took part. They were married from 1921 (other sources say 1920) to 1929. She was a sculptor, later a librarian at the Frankfurt Institute. She emigrated to the Soviet Union and worked there (among other things?) as a translator at the VAGAAR, an Organisation for foreign workers. and from 1925 to 1933 was a member of the institute.

He received his Ph.D. from the Frankfurter Universität in 1928, where his supervisors were Wilhelm Gerloff, Richard Wilhelm and Franz Oppenheimer. His thesis was On the Economical Importance of the Agrarian and Industrial Productive Forces in China, (Die ökonomische Bedeutung der agrikolen und industriellen Produktivkräfte Chinas Kohlhammer Verlag, Stuttgart. 1930, which became the first chapter of Wirtschaft und Gesellschaft Chinas, 1931.

Wittfogel was an active member of the German communist party and a vocal critic of its enemies. In a short 1974 notice to a reprint of his 1929 essay on Political Geography, Wittfogel says he came out much stronger against the Nazis than the KPD and Komintern line wanted. Communist students at Jena invited him and Alfred Bäumler for a debate on the importance of Hegel for the Germany of today. Bäumler was a specialist on Kant, Nietzsche and Bachofen, who soon became a leading Nazi philosopher. When Hitler came to power in 1933, Wittfogel tried to escape to Switzerland, but was arrested and interned in prisons and concentration camps. His second wife Olga Joffe Lang worked for his release and, with the help of right-wing revolutionary Friedrich Hielscher, the also radical right-wing geographer Karl Haushofer, and the London School of Economics historian R. H. Tawney, managed to get Wittfogel free in 1934.

He left Germany for England and then the United States. Wittfogel's belief in the Soviet Union was destroyed with the Molotov–Ribbentrop Pact, and he began to hate the totalitarian, "asiatic" nature of Soviet and Chinese Communism from Lenin to Mao. He turned against his former comrades and denounced American scholars such as Owen Lattimore and Moses I. Finley, at the McCarran Committee hearings in 1951. He came to believe that the state-owned economies of the Soviet bloc inevitably led to despotic governments even more oppressive than those of "traditional Asia" and that those regimes were the greatest threat to the future of all mankind.

=== Playwrighting and aesthetics ===
In the early 1920s, Wittfogel wrote a number of communist, but also somewhat expressionistic, plays: "The Cripple", performed with other short plays on October 14, 1920, at Erwin Piscator's Berlin Proletarian Theatre. Piscator himself played the Cripple at the opening. John Heartfield managed a half-hour late delivery of the backdrop The KPD newspaper Die Rote Fahne published a harsh review of the plays, and "Red Soldiers", "The Man Who Has an Idea", "The Mother", "The Refugee", "The Skyscraper" and "Who is the Biggest Fool?", all of which were published by Malik. Wittfogel declined an offer to become the dramatic producer of the revolutionary Volksbühne (People's Stage) in Berlin, because he wanted to concentrate on his academic studies. He published Hegelian essays on aesthetics and literature in Die Linkskurve, journal of the Association of Proletarian Revolutionary Writers, and was a member of its editorial staff from April 1930. His conservative aesthetics put Wittfogel on Lukacs' side—not what might have been expected from his plays. With the earlier Dada and Proletkult debates, the Mehring-, documentary- and proletarian-literature feud, from 1928 on became part of the long and bitter debate on literary modernism and communism, which culminated in the 1930s onslaught on Expressionism in the Moscow journal Das Wort. The debate was rekindled in the 1960s as the Brecht-Lukacs debate. At the time, Brecht had not really been able to publish his views.

Wittfogel believed in the party at least until 1933 and still sometimes fiercely defended it until at least around 1939 (he broke with Paul Massing over the Ruth Fischer revelations), even in the 1920s Wittfogel had ideas of his own, e.g. on nature, which to him could never simply be a part of human history and pure object of thinking, an idea Lukacs did not like at all. With very few others he took Marx's idea of a genuine "asiatic" way of pre-capitalist development seriously. At a Leningrad conference in 1931, all those ideas of an "asiatic" "mode of production" were shot down and buried by the Stalinist majority. They resurfaced around 1960, but by then Wittfogel was of course a non-person in communist eyes.

=== Oriental Despotism ===
Wittfogel is best known for his monumental work Oriental Despotism: A Comparative Study of Total Power, first published in 1957. Starting from a Marxist analysis of the ideas of Max Weber on China and India's "hydraulic-bureaucratic official-state" and building on Marx's sceptical view of the Asiatic Mode of Production, Wittfogel came up with an analysis of Oriental despotism which emphasized the role of irrigation works, the bureaucratic structures needed to maintain them and the impact that they had on society. He coined the term "hydraulic empire" to describe the system. In his view, many societies, mainly in Asia, relied heavily on the building of large-scale irrigation works. To do so, the state had to organize forced labor from the population at large. As only a centralized administration could organize the building and maintenance of large-scale systems of irrigation, the need for such systems made bureaucratic despotism inevitable in so-called Oriental lands. That structure was uniquely placed also to crush civil society and any other force capable of mobilizing against the state. Such a state would inevitably be despotic, powerful, stable and wealthy. Wittfogel believed the hydraulic hypothesis to apply to Russia under the Soviet Union.

The sinologist Frederick W. Mote, however, strongly disagreed with Wittfogel's analysis, as did John K. Fairbank. Others, such as Barrington Moore, George Lichtheim and especially Pierre Vidal-Naquet found the thesis stimulating. F. Tökei, Gianni Sofri, Maurice Godelier and Wittfogel's estranged pupil Lawrence Krader, concentrated on the concept. Two Berlin leaders of the SDS student movement, Rudi Dutschke and Bernd Rabehl, have published on these themes. Then East German dissident Rudolf Bahro later said that his Alternative in Eastern Europe was based on ideas of Wittfogel but because of the latter's later anticommunism, could not mention him by name. Bahro's later ecological ideas, recounted in From Red to Green and elsewhere were likewise inspired by Wittfogel's geographical determinism.

The hydraulic thesis was also taken up by ecological anthropologists such as Marvin Harris. Further applications of the thesis included that to Mayan society, when aerial photographs revealed the network of canals in the Mayan areas of Yucatan. Critics have denied that Ceylon or Bali are truly hydraulic in the Wittfogel sense.

== Selected works in German ==
- Vom Urkommunismus bis zur proletarischen Revolution, Eine Skizze der Entwicklung der bürgerlichen Gesellschaft, 1. Teil: Urkommunismus und Feudalismus, Verlag Junge Garde, Berlin C 2, 1922, 79 p.
- Die Wissenschaft der bürgerlichen Gesellschaft. Eine marxistische Untersuchung, Malik, Berlin, 1922
- Geschichte der bürgerlichen Gesellschaft. Von ihren Anfängen bis zur Schwelle der großen Revolution, Malik, Wien, 1924
- Das erwachende China, Ein Abriß der Geschichte und der gegenwärtigen Probleme Chinas, AGIS Verlag, Wien, 1926
- Shanghai- Kanton, Vereinigung Internationale Verlags-Anstalten, Berlin, 1927
- Wirtschaft und Gesellschaft Chinas, Versuch der wissenschaftlichen Analyse einer großen asiatischen Agrargesellschaft, Hirschfeld, Leipzig, 1931, XXIV, 767 P. (=Schriften des Instituts für Sozialforschung der Universität Frankfurt am Main, No. 3)
- "Die natürlichen Ursachen der Wirtschaftsgeschichte," in Archiv für Sozialwissenschaft und Sozialpolitik, 67, 1932, pp. 466–492, 597–609, 711–731.
- "Die Theorie der orientalischen Gesellschaft", in Zeitschrift für Sozialforschung, Vol. 7, No. 1/2, Alcan, Paris, 1938

=== Plays ===
- Julius Haidvogel (= K. A. Wittfogel), "Der Krüppel "(The Cripple), in Der Gegner, Vol. 2, Nr. 4, Malik, Berlin, 1920, p. 94ff.
- Rote Soldaten. Politische Tragödie in fünf Akten (Red Soldiers), Malik, Berlin, 1921
- Der Mann der eine Idee hat. Erotisches Schauspiel in vier Akten (The Man Who Has an Idea), Malik, Berlin, 1922, and 1933
- Die Mutter - Der Flüchtling. Zwei Einakter (The Mother & The Refugee, 2 one-act plays, Malik, Berlin, 1922
- Wer ist der Dümmste? Eine Frage an das Schicksal in einem Vorspiel und vier Akten. (Who is the Biggest Fool?), Malik, Berlin, 1923
  - Gustav von Wangenheim, Da liegt der Hund begraben und andere Stücke, Aus dem Repertoire der Truppe 31, Rowohlt, Reinbek b. Hamburg, 1974
- Der Wolkenkratzer. Amerikanischer Sketch (The Skyscraper), Malik, 1924

== Works in English ==
- "The Foundations and Stages of Chinese Economic History", Zeitschrift für Sozialforschung, Alcan, Paris, 4, 1935, p. 26–60.
- New Light on Chinese Society; An Investigation of China's Socio-Economic Structure, Institute of Pacific Relations, New York, 1938
- The Society of Prehistoric China, Alcan, Paris, 1939
- Meteorological Records from the Divination Inscriptions of Shang, American Geographical Society (1940)
- Wittfogel, Karl A; Goldfrank, Esther S (1943). "Some Aspects of Pueblo Mythology and Society". The Journal of American Folklore. 56 (219): 17–30. doi:10.2307/535911. JSTOR 535911.
- Public Office in the Liao Dynasty and the Chinese Examination System ..., Harvard-Yenching Institute (1947)
- With Fêng Chia-Shêng et al., History of Chinese Society, Liao, 907–1125, American Philosophical Society, Transactions. Distributed by the Macmillan Co., New York, 1949. Google Books
  - With Chia-Shêng Fêng and Karl H. Menges, History of Chinese society: Liao (907–1125). Appendix V, Qara-Khitay 1949
- Russia and Asia: Problems of Contemporary Area Studies and International Relations, 1950
- Asia's Freedom...and the Land Question, 1950
- The Influence of Leninism-Stalinism on China, 1951?
- The Review of Politics: The Historical Position of Communist China: Doctrine and Reality, University of Notre Dame Press (1954)
- Mao Tse-tung, Liberator or Destroyer of the Chinese Peasants? Free Trade Union Committee, American Federation of Labor, New York, 1955
- The Hydraulic Civilizations Chicago, 1956
- Oriental Despotism: A Comparative Study of Total Power Yale University Press, 1957
- Chinese Society: An Historical Survey, 1957
- The New Men, Hong Kong, 1958?
- Food and Society in China and India, New York, 1959
- Peking's "Independence (1959)
- The Marxist View of Russian Society and Revolution, 1960
- Viewer's Guide to From Marx to Mao, University of Washington (1960)
- The Legend of Maoism, 1960?
- Class Structure and Total Power in Oriental Despotism, 1960
- A Stronger Oriental Despotism, 1960
- The Russian and Chinese Revolutions: A Socio-Historical Comparison, 1961
- The Marxist View of China China Quarterly, 1962
- Agrarian Problems and the Moscow-Peking Axis, 1962
- A Short History of Chinese Communism, University of Washington, 1964
- The Chinese Red Guards and the "Lin Piao Line, American-Asian Educational Exchange, Inc. (1967)
- Results and Problems of the Study of Oriental Despotism 1969
- Agriculture: a Key to the Understanding of Chinese Society, Past and Present, Australian National University Press, 1970
- Communist and Non-Communist Agrarian Systems, with Special Reference to the U.S.S.R. and Communist China, a Comparative Approach Univ. of Washington Press, Seattle, 1971
- The Hydraulic Approach to Pre-spanish Mesoamerica, Austin, 1972
- Some Remarks on Mao's Handling of Concepts and Problems of Dialectics, University of Washington. Far Eastern and Russian Institute, not dated

=== Papers ===
- Papers, 1939-1970 Collected papers of Karl August Wittfogel (1939-1970) University of Washington Libraries
- Register of Karl Wittfogel Papers Hoover Institution
