= Maik Hosang =

German philosopher, future researcher and human ecologist (born 1961)

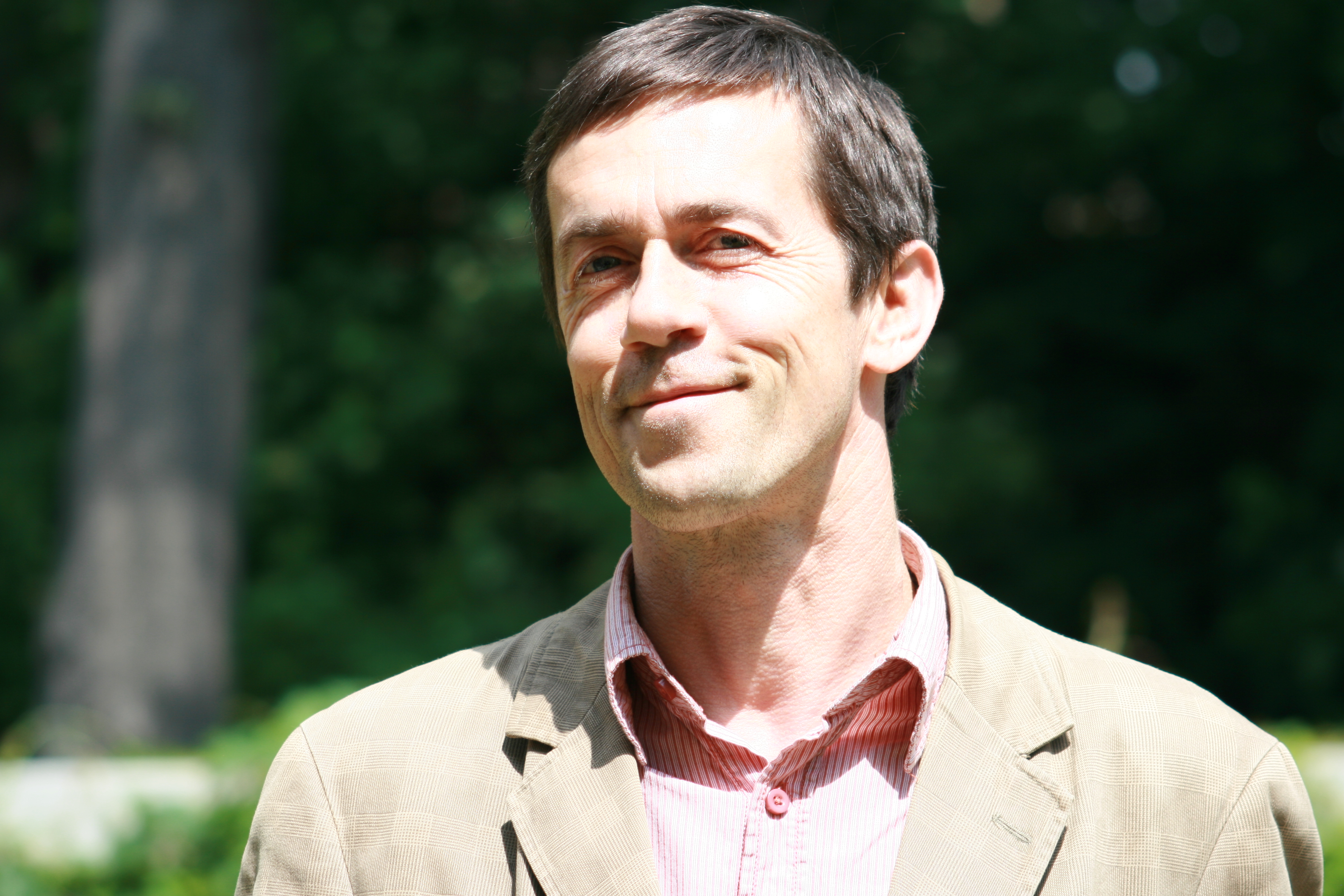
- Maik Hosang
- Born: 29 December 1961 (age 64); Bautzen
- Education: Humboldt University of Berlin
- Known for: Co-Founder of the LebensGut Pommritz and of the Network for Metamodern Culture
- Scientific career
- Fields: Philosophy, Human Ecology, Humanistic Psychology
- Workplaces: University Zittau/Goerlitz, Network for Metamodern Culture Hochkirch/Berlin
- Doctoral advisors: Rudolf Bahro, Rupert Riedl

Maik Hosang (born 29 December 1961 in Bautzen) is a German philosopher, future researcher and human ecologist.

== Life ==
Hosang studied philosophy, psychology and anthropology at the Humboldt-University of Berlin. In connection with the theories of Johann Gottlieb Fichte, Nicolai Hartmann, Max Scheler, Manfred Eigen, Erich Jantsch and others he wrote his thesis to the topic "The Human Being in the evolutionary layers of self-organization." He received the degree of Doctor of Philosophy (Dr. phil.) 1990 at the Humboldt-University of Berlin.

Together with the philosopher Rudolf Bahro he founded in 1990 the Institute for Social Ecology at the Humboldt-University of Berlin and worked here from 1990 to 1998. In 1993, together with his friends and with the support of the Saxon Prime Minister Kurt Biedenkopf, he founded the socio-ecological model project LebensGut in Pommritz. After the death of Rudolf Bahro, he transferred the Institute for Social Ecology to this place.

In addition to the management of this institute, he is a professor for Cultural Sciences at the University of Zittau/Görlitz since 2014. There he established together with other scientists a research group for transformation sciences.

== Research ==
In 1999, Hosang published the book "Homo sapiens integralis, Transdisciplinary Terms for Sustainable Development" (in German published with the title "Der integrale Mensch") at the Humboldt-Universität Berlin. and became one of the first German scientists in the new field of research in social ecology. He received the degree of Doctor habil of Social Ecology 1999 at the Humboldt-University of Berlin, with reviews from Rupert Riedl and Vittorie Hösle.

In a project sponsored by the German Federal Ministry of Education and Research, Hosang together with the environmental scientist Bernd Markert and the biochemist Stefan Fränzle compared various socio-ecological thinking and research approaches and developed the theory of the biocultural or "emotional matrix" – an emotional depth structure which, according to her opinion, is the basis of all human cultures and societies and which has a similar meaning to social systems as the genetic code for biotic systems.

Further focuses of his work are the connections between ecology, ethics, love and freedom as well as of sustainability and happiness research.

Together with the artist Ulrich Schollmeyer and others, he developed and realized the Philosophical Experience Exhibition at the Lebensgut Pommritz.

Together with Heinrich Kronbichler, Dolores Richter and Simone Debour, he initiated 2014 the philosophy festival of love held in Berlin since then.

Together with the neurobiologist Gerald Hüther and the theologian Anselm Grün, Hosang developed an inter- and transdisciplinary theory of love and creativity.

== Selected publications ==
- Maik Hosang (publisher): Rudolf Bahro: Apokalypse oder Geist einer neuen Zeit, edition ost, Berlin 1995, ISBN 3929161532
- Maik Hosang: Der integrale Mensch, Hinder & Deelmann, Gladenbach 2000, ISBN 3873481685
- Maik Hosang und Reinhardt St. Tomek: Ethik-Kodex 2000, D. Fischer Verlag, Frankfurt/M. 2000, ISBN 3923135467
- Bernd Markert/Stefan Fränzle/Maik Hosang: Vorzeichenwechsel. Wie Gesellschaft sich verändern kann, Peter Lang Verlag, Berlin und Wien 2005
- Maik Hosang/Stefan Fränzle/Bernd Markert: Die emotionale Matrix. Grundlagen für gesellschaftlichen Wandel und nachhaltige Innovation, ökom-Verlag, München 2005, ISBN 3865810071
- Bernd Markert/Helmut Lieth/Peter Menke-Glückert/Maik Hosang/Stefan Fränzle: Zur Existenz eines ganz starken anthropischen Prinzips, Bod-Verlag, Norderstedt 2006, ISBN 9783833452697
- Maik Hosang und Kurt Seifert (publisher): Integration. Natur – Kultur – Mensch, ökom-Verlag, München 2006, ISBN 3865810519
- Maik Hosang: Jacob Böhme – Der erste deutsche Philosoph. Das Wunder von Görlitz, Senfkorn-Verlag, Görlitz 2007, ISBN 3935330243
- Maik Hosang: The Logic of Love: A Short Theory of an Integral Science and Ethics, in: JOURNAL OF CONSCIOUS EVOLUTION - A Journal of Transdisciplinary Scholarship | Integral Studies | ISSN 1555-9262
- Kurt Biedenkopf, Ralf Dahrendorf, Erich Fromm, Maik Hosang (publisher), Petra Kelly u.a.: Klimawandel und Grundeinkommen. Die nicht zufällige Gleichzeitigkeit beider Themen und ein sozialökologisches Experiment, Andreas Mascha Verlag, München 2008, ISBN 9783924404734
- Maik Hosang: Eves Welt. Liebe in Zeiten des Klimawandels, Phänomen Verlag, 2008, ISBN 9783933321725
- Maik Hosang und Wilken Wehrt: Seufzer und Freiheit. Philosophische Reflexionen, Novum Verlag, 2009, ISBN 9783852519289
- Gerald Hüther und Maik Hosang: Die Liebe ist ein Kind der Freiheit – Die Freiheit ist ein Kind der Liebe, Kreuz Verlag, 2012, ISBN 978-3451611445
- Gerald Hüther, Maik Hosang, Anselm Grün: Liebe ist die einzige Revolution. Drei Impulse für KoKreativität und Potenzialentfaltung, Herder Verlag, 2017, ISBN 978-3451328626
- Maik Hosang und Natascha Reith: Kreativität und Ko-Kreativität – Wie Menschen einander kreativ inspirieren und dabei die Welt verändern können. Pikok-Verlag, 2019, ISBN 978-1-0917-9107-7
- Maik Hosang und Bodo Janssen: Die Kunst des Liebens im Tun. Warum und wie Unternehmer die Welt verändern, Pikok Verlag, 2019, ISBN 978-1-0896-1494-4
- Maik Hosang und Yve Stöbel-Richter: Die Kunst des wirklichen Lebens. 33 Zeichen und Wege für Dein Höheres Selbst und was die Wissenschaft dazu sagt, Pikok Verlag, 2019, ISBN 978-1-7108-0912-1
- Maik Hosang und Gerald Hüther (Hrsg.): Bewusstsein, Liebe & Kreativität: Human- und Kulturpotenziale im Anthropozän, Pikok Verlag, 2020, ISBN 979-8-5594-1123-1
- mit Gerald Hüther: Die Metamoderne: Neue Wege zur Entpolarisierung und Befriedung der Gesellschaft, Vandenhoeck & Ruprecht, Göttingen 2024, ISBN 978-3-525-40034-0.
- mit Gerald Hüther: Wir sind Körper, Bewusstsein und schöpferische Liebe: Die bahnbrechenden metamodernen Erkenntnisse von Federico Faggin und anderen Wissenschaftlern zum Quantenfeld und dem menschlichen Potenzial, Metamodern-Verlag, Berlin und Hochkirch 2025, ISBN 979-8312818895.
- The wondrous world of Tomorrow: Or how Mother Teresa inspired Elon Musk, Metamodern-Verlag, 2026, ISBN 979-8-25282957-9.
