= Esther Schiff Goldfrank =

American anthropologist

- Born: 1896
- Died: 23 April 1997 (aged 100–101)
- Education: Barnard College Columbia University
- Organization: American Ethnological Society secretary-treasurer (1945–47) president (1948) editor (1952–56)

Esther Schiff Goldfrank (1896 – 23 April 1997) was an American anthropologist of the famous German-American Schiff family. She had studied with Franz Boas and specialized in the Pueblo Indians. She worked closely with Elsie Clews Parsons and also with Ruth Benedict on the Blackfoot. She published on Pueblo religion, Cochiti sociology and Isleta drawings. Goldfrank received her bachelor's degree from Barnard College in 1918 and graduated from Columbia University in 1937.

Esther Schiff Goldfrank married the historian and sinologist Karl August Wittfogel after the death in 1935 of her first husband, Walter Goldfrank.

== Biography ==
Esther Schiff Goldfrank was born in 1896 New York City to Dr. Herman J. Schiff and Matilda Metzger Schiff. Before she was twenty, she had outlived both of her parents and her only sibling, Jack. Although not much is known about her childhood, she had attended Ethical Culture High School and eventually enrolled in Barnard College, where she received her A.B in economics in 1918. After graduating, she worked as a secretary on Wall Street for a year, not unusual for a female college graduate at the time. In 1919, at the insistence of a friend, she applied for the secretarial position to Franz Boas, chair of the Columbia Anthropology Department, and was immediately hired.

Although Schiff had little knowledge about the field of Anthropology, when she had learned that Boas was planning a trip to Laguna Pueblo during the summer of 1920, she asked to be taken along. Boas was disconcerted at the idea, as she was untrained, unmarried, and he lacked the financial support to bring her, after seeking the advice of Elsie Clews Parsons, it was agreed that Schiff would join the trip. This marked the beginning of her career in anthropological fieldwork, starting pretty much accidentally.

Schiff married Walter S. Goldfrank in 1922. Walter died in 1935 after which she married her second husband, Karl August Wittfogel, in 1940.

== Fieldwork ==
Goldfrank studied the Pueblo Indians during her time with Boas. She moved into the Pueblo after a chance meeting with a Conchiti woman at a well. Her notes from this time resulted in the 1927 monograph, The Social and Ceremonial Organization on Conchiti. Most of her fieldwork took place between 1920 and 1922.

After the death of her first husband, Goldfrank took a field trip to Alberta, Canada. Her findings led to the 1945 monograph, Changing Configurations in the Social Organization of a Blackfoot Tribe During the Reserve Period.

Goldfrank published her memoirs, Notes on an Undirected Life, in 1978.

== Selected works ==
- Notes on Two Pueblo Feasts. American Anthropologist 25 (2): 188–96. 1923.
- Isleta Variants: A Study in Flexibility. Journal of American Folklore 39:71–78. 1926.
- The Social and Ceremonial Organization of Cochiti. American Anthropological Association Memoir. No. 33:5–129. 1927.
- Changing Configurations in the Social Organization of a Blackfoot Tribe During the Reserve Period (The Blood of Alberta, Canada), J.J. Augustin Publisher, 1945.
- Isleta Paintings, Smithsonian Institution, 1962.
- The artist of "Isleta paintings" in Pueblo society (Smithsonian contributions to anthropology), Smithsonian Institution, 1967.
- The social and ceremonial organization of Cochiti (Memoirs of the American Anthropological Association), Kraus, 1974.
- Notes on an undirected life: As one anthropologist tells it (Queens College publications in Anthropology, no. 3, 1978.

== Bibliography ==
- Gloria Levitas, Esther Schiff Goldfrank, p. 120–126, in Women Anthropologists, Ute Gacs, editor, new ed., University of Illinois Press, Chicago, 1989.
