= Oriental Despotism =

1957 American book

Oriental Despotism: A Comparative Study of Total Power
- Title page for Oriental Despotism: A Comparative Study of Total Power (1957)
- Author: Karl August Wittfogel
- Publisher: Yale University Press
- Publication date: 1957
- Publication place: United States

Oriental Despotism: A Comparative Study of Total Power is a book of political theory and comparative history by Karl August Wittfogel (1896–1988) published by Yale University Press in 1957. The book offers an explanation for the despotic governments in "Oriental" societies, where control of water was necessary for irrigation and flood-control. Managing these projects required large-scale bureaucracies, which dominated the economy, society, and religious life. This despotism differed from the Western experience, where power was distributed among contending groups. The book argues that this form of "hydraulic despotism" characterized ancient Egypt and Mesopotamia, Hellenistic Greece and imperial Rome, the Abbasid Caliphate, imperial China, the Moghul empire, and Incan Peru. Wittfogel further argues that 20th century Marxist-Leninist regimes, such as the Soviet Union and People's Republic of China, though they were not themselves hydraulic societies, did not break away from their historical condition and remained systems of "total power" and "total terror".

The book was both welcomed as an historically grounded analysis of despotism that warned the West against the expansion of Communist totalitarianism and criticized as a Cold War polemic. The materialist and ecological theories in Oriental Despotism influenced ecological anthropologists and global economic historians even though some of them found fault with its methodology and empirical basis or questioned Wittfogel's political motives.

== Background ==
Wittfogel, who was educated in German centers of sinology and joined the Communist Party of Germany in 1920, was dissatisfied with the debate on the Asiatic mode of production (AMP) that traced back to Montesquieu and Hegel. During the 1920s and early 1930s he debated with orthodox Marxist-Leninists who followed Joseph Stalin's dictum that all societies evolved through the same stages of historical growth, which Asia must therefore follow. When he was freed from a Nazi prison in Germany, he came to the United States with his wife in 1933 and made several trips to China for research. Wittfogel's interests in China and immersion in Marxist analysis led him to conclusions on the theory of oriental despotism that differed from Marxist tradition. Marx held that historical development outside Europe did not follow the pattern he saw in Europe. Europe, he wrote, developed through a process of class conflict from an ancient slave society to feudalism, then bourgeois capitalism, and from there to socialism and eventually communism. Modern Europe, in Marx's classic formulation, was created by the conflict between the emerging bourgeois and industrial capitalist classes, on the one hand, and the Ancient Regime of feudal economy on the other.

Wittfogel suggested Asia was immobile because rulers controlled society but there were no slaves, as in Marx's slave society, nor serfs, as in feudal society: there were no classes, no class conflict, and thus no change. This proposition did not explain how rulers gained their absolute power and why no forces in society opposed them. Wittfogel asked whether there was an explanation found only in these societies. Marxists in both the Soviet Union and in Western countries explored these questions as important in themselves, but with special heat because both liberals and conservatives in the West wanted to decide whether Stalin's Russia was an authentic communist system in Marx's sense or whether it was itself an example of oriental despotism. One historian of the concept remarks that for Wittfogel, "the analysis of Asia was actually intended as a discussion of political relationships within the 'West'".

In the late 1920 and early 1930s, orthodox theorists in Moscow spurned Wittfogel's views because they differed from Stalin's and Chinese Marxists rejected them also because they implied that China did not have the capability to develop. On a trip to Moscow, however, Wittfogel met the young Chinese scholar Ji Chaoding, an underground communist who became his intellectual disciple. Ji came to the United States for graduate work at Columbia University. Ji's doctoral dissertation, published in 1936 as The Role of Irrigation In Chinese History, argued that a dynasty's success depended on control of irrigation, which increased agricultural production, and especially water transportation, which gave the government both military and financial control. Wittfogel also had a productive intellectual relation in the 1930s with Owen Lattimore, whom he met in China. Lattimore, who shared Wittfogel's interest in ecological structures and material conditions, argued that the history of Inner Asia was dominated by the interaction between settled agricultural societies that flourished in the relatively well-watered rim and the pastoral societies that survived in arid Central Asia.

== Publication ==
Beginning in the 1930s, Wittfogel pursued research projects that formed a background and preparation for Oriental Despotism and published articles presenting aspects of its argument. He finished a manuscript in 1954, but for several years publishers turned it down. Perhaps the topic did not seem attractive or perhaps the political atmosphere seemed hostile to a book with a Marxist argument even if that argument was strongly critical of the Soviet Union and the communist government in China. Wittfogel may have had to supply a publication subsidy to Yale University Press.

== The structure and argument of the book ==
The book has ten chapters:

- Chapter 1. The Natural Setting of Hydraulic Society
  - explains the geographical settings of hydraulic empires, including ancient Egypt and Mesopotamia, Hellenistic Greece and imperial Rome, imperial China, the Abbasid Caliphate, the Moghul empire, the Inca Empire in Peru, and twentieth century Marxist-Leninist regimes. He prefers the term "hydraulic" rather than "Oriental," but uses them interchangeably.
- Chapter 2. Hydraulic Economy, – a Managerial and Genuinely Political Economy
- Chapter 3. A State Stronger than Society
- Chapter 4. Despotic Power, – Total and Not Benevolent
  The absence of effective constitutional and societal checks and "beggars' democracy".
- Chapter 5. Total Terror, Total Submission, Total Loneliness"
  - argues that "hydraulic government" is despotic by its very nature. This was a form of "total power" because there were no social, legal, or cultural constraints. Wittfogel also denies that in the case of imperial China there were "rights of rebellion", such as other Chinese and foreign scholars have seen, but he does hold that a "law of diminishing administrative returns" kept rulers from controlling all aspects of their subjects' lives, so that "genuine elements of freedom remained." This freedom, however, amounted only to a "beggar's democracy." The "rationality coefficient of hydraulic society" means the society's ability to get things done, operating at three levels at which the government must be effective: managing the agrarian economy, ("managerial"); using corvee and taxes, ("consumptive"); and maintaining peace and order, ("judicial)
- Chapter 6. The Core, the Margin, and the Submargin of Hydraulic Societies
- Chapter 7. Patterns of Proprietary Complexity in Hydraulic Society
- Chapter 8. Classes in Hydraulic Society
- Chapter 9. The Rise and Fall of the Theory of the Asiatic Mode of Production
- Chapter 10. Oriental Society in Transition

== Reception ==
The initial reaction to Oriental Despotism in the American press was wide and warm. Reviewers noted that Wittfogel had been working on these questions in some form since the 1930s but that the book was important for understanding the post-war world. The reviewer in The Geographical Review advised that "every geographer concerned with Asia, and every political geographer whatever the regional concern, should read it". He hoped that "historians, political scientists, deans, and college presidents will see it as evidence that ... 'most of the world' is just as important as traditional focus on North America and Western Europe." He added that "the book makes impressively clear that there is a great mass of despotic practice in the most populous parts of the world that cannot be transformed magically by democratic catalysis." Yet "environmental determinism" is "explicitly denied," as Wittfogel speaks of "the opportunity, not the necessity" for agromanagerial despotism.

Area specialist scholars, however, questioned the concept for their particular regions. Jerome A. Offner, for instance, disagreed with the scholars who used the concept of oriental despotism for understanding of Aztec political organization and society. The concept is "demonstrably false," wrote Offner, at least for the state of Texcoco: irrigation had no significant role, there was extensive private property in land, and the government did not dominate the economy, since the market was extensive. Ervand Abrahamian assessed the applicability of the theory to Qajar Iran.

The British anthropologist Edmund Leach objected that most of the hydraulic civilisations of the past were in semi-arid regions where irrigation "did not require a despotic monarch to build vast aqueducts and reservoirs; it simply called for elementary and quite localised drainage construction and perhaps the diversion of river flood water into the flat lands on either side of the main stream." Leach further objected that Wittfogel did not deal with India, the state which Marx saw as the ideal type of "Asiatic society", and ignored the other states of South and Southeast Asia, which were all "hydraulic societies." Subsequent historical research has examined irrigation and water control in colonial settings, illustrating how hydraulic infrastructure could contribute to territorial administration without producing uniformly centralized despotic systems. A recent study on Spanish colonial irrigation in the Philippines show that dams and canal networks reorganized agrarian landscapes into productive and governable zones, linking local land and water management to colonial bureaucratic authority while leaving other regions beyond infrastructural reach more autonomous.

The sociologist Shmuel Noah Eisenstadt questioned Oriental Despotism in regard to Islamic societies. He saw the earlier oriental despotism theorists and Wittfogel as "precursors, or manifestations of what would later be called the 'Orientalist' approach," which Edward Said accused of imposing this type of analysis on Islamic societies.

The reception among scholars of China was especially skeptical. The Princeton University sinologist Frederick Mote wrote that Wittfogel "presents effective arguments, and the neatness of his total view of Chinese despotism is compelling, yet when it is applied to any one period of history there appear certain difficulties in accepting his arguments." Wittfogel "does not write of Chinese government and society as a historian; the reader does not sense any awareness of the steadily cumulative development through the centuries which gave each age its own character." The Song dynasty emperors, for instance, had great power but did not use it despotically; Zhu Yuanzhang, the founder of the Ming dynasty, took advantage of accidents and timing to become absolute ruler. Mote was especially concerned to explain the limits of power and the limits of terror, which he believed Wittfogel did not appreciate. Thus "total power," Mote wrote, "while not a meaningless phrase, must be understood in the context of a complex historical situation." It existed in Ming China, but even then it did not mean that totalitarian power was "omnipresent and omnicompetent." If this power concentrated on any single objective, it probably could accomplish that objective, but by the nature of the cultural environment, it could not accomplish many of them.

Gregory Blue of the University of Toronto commented that "despite its analytical sweep and evident learning, Wittfogel's model made it difficult to understand why government involvement in Chinese social life seemed to have been distinctly limited during the imperial era (221 B.C.E. - 1911 CE.) or how Chinese society could have ever flourished at all". Wittfogel's reading of China as a hydraulic despotism, Blue speculated, also aimed to undermine John Fairbank's "Grand Alliance distinction between 'fascist-conservative and communist-progressive forms of totalitarianism'..." Another historian of the Ming dynasty, Timothy Brook, wrote that historians were burdened with the task of responding to Wittfogel's charge that the dynasty was "despotic," one that he did not think was justified.

Perry Anderson objected that the concept of the Asiatic Mode of Production was too broad to be meaningful:

A ubiquitous ‘Asiatism’ [sic] represents no improvement on a universal ‘feudalism’: in fact, it is even less rigorous as a term. What serious historical unity exists between Ming China and Megalithic Ireland, Pharaonic Egypt and Hawaii? It is perfectly clear that such social formations are unimaginably distant from one another.

Anderson continued that “this vulgar charivari, devoid of any historical sense, jumbles together pell-mell Imperial Rome, Tsarist Russia, Hopi Arizona, Sung China, Chaggan East Africa, Mamluk Egypt, Inca Peru, Ottoman Turkey, and Sumerian Mesopotamia – not to speak of Byzantium or Babylonia, Persia, or Hawaii.”

Wittfogel's biographer Gary Ulmen replied to these criticisms that to focus on "hydraulic despotism" was to misunderstand Wittfogel's general thesis. In fact, Ulmen continued, Wittfogel had considered a number of alternative ways to frame his proposition and there were many more demonstrations of the theory than "hydraulic" despotism.

Wittfogel wrote in 1960 that the People's Republic of China was not a "hydraulic society," but that it represented a "stronger form of oriental despotism."

== Influence ==
Oriental Despotism was influential for its methodology and its findings. Joseph Needham appreciated Wittfogel's early work for its combination of Weberian understanding of bureaucracy and Marxist political analysis. In developing his study, Science and Civilisation in China, Needham remarked that Wittfogel's Marxism in the period before he came to the United States was "chiefly an emphasis on social and economic factors in Chinese history which had been overlooked by others.” After World War II, John K. Fairbank invited Wittfogel to Harvard University to deliver a series of talks to his graduate seminar in Area Studies. Wittfogel was one of the influences on Fairbank's The United States and China (1948), a survey that synthesized the standard work of historians and social scientists. Wittfogel left Columbia University in 1949 to join the University of Washington study group on Modern China. One member, the historian Hsiao Kung-ch'uan, for instance, used Wittfogel's concept of "beggar's democracy" in his massive study, Rural China . Frederic Wakeman saw Wittfogel as the defining influence in the group, but the historian Alice Miller disagreed.

The water-control thesis encouraged the development of the field of ecological anthropology and ecological political science, that is, theoretical approaches that combined geographical and environmental factors. Wittfogel participated in a 1953 session at the American Anthropological Association and in a following conference organized by Julian Steward at University of Illinois in 1955. The appearance of Oriental Despotism in print further influenced anthropologists such as Robert McCormick Adams, Stanley Diamond, Morton Fried, Marvin Harris, Angel Palerm, and Eric Wolf. Wittfogel's work encouraged the development of cultural materialism, for instance in the work of Julian Steward. These scholars tested and challenged Wittfogel's conclusions. Robert McCormick Adams, for instance, found that the archeological evidence in Mesopotamia indicated that irrigation might help consolidate political control but did not by itself cause despotic rule.

The political geographer James Morris Blaut credited Wittfogel with updating Marx and Weber but sharply criticized what he regarded as the misuse of Wittfogel in what he called “the myth of the European miracle,” that is, "the rather archaic doctrine" that environmental factors made Europe modern and the Orient stagnant and despotic. Blaut sees the influence of Wittfogel in the writings of "miracle theorists," such as Eric L. Jones, and his book, The European Miracle: Environments, Economies and Geopolitics in the History of Europe and Asia , which cites Oriental Despotism extensively but not uncritically. These thinkers, Blaut charges, share “the most fundamental error,” that is, “to believe, or assume, that one type of environment produces a particular type of society and the latter then persists down through history. Culture changes...." In the 1930s, Wittfogel's work was translated and used by scholars in Japan, but after the war not so much attention was paid.

== Political implications ==
David Price, a scholar of Cold War social science, declared that Wittfogel's writings "become so mired in his personal anti-communist crusade that it can be difficult to disentangle his anti-totalitarian vehemence from his theoretical contributions." Price argued that Wittfogel took advantage of the fact that he was one of the few Asia scholars to cooperate with Cold War investigations and that this cooperation protected his Marxist analysis from criticism; Wittfogel's ecological materialism escaped criticism even in the Cold War heightened fear of Communism because he was accepted as anti-communist. The scholar of political ecology, Paul Robbins, notes that Wittfogel, having been accused of being a communist sympathizer, protested loudly and accused Owen Lattimore and other colleagues of being communists; he wrote Oriental Despotism in the midst of this political struggle. Gregory Blue called final words of the book — "not with the spear only, but with the battleax" —the "Spartan view on how Greeks should fight Persian imperialism" that "represented a highbrow version of 'better red than dead.'"

David Landes, a Harvard historian of comparative East/West economic and social development, struck back: the "hydraulic thesis has been roundly criticized by a generation of Western sinologists zealous in their political correctness (Maoism and its later avatars are good) and quick to defend China’s supposed commitment to democracy. Wittfogel is the preferred target." Landes explained these criticisms by saying that "almost all these critics of the water connection are courting the favor of an umbrageous regime, dispenser of invitations and access.”

== Sources ==
=== Wittfogel's writings on Oriental Despotism ===
- Wirtschaft und Gesellschaft Chinas, Versuch der wissenschaftlichen Analyse einer großen asiatischen Agrargesellschaft, (Hirschfeld: Leipzig, Schriften des Instituts für Sozialforschung der Universität Frankfurt am Main, No. 3; 1931)
- —— (1936). "Key Economic Areas in Chinese History (Review)". Pacific Affairs. 9 (3): 449–450. doi:10.2307/2750659. JSTOR 2750659.
- —— (1938). New Light on Chinese Society: An Investigation of China's Socio-Economic Structure. NY: International secretariat Institute of Pacific relations.
- with Jiasheng Feng (1949). History of Chinese Society: Liao, 907-1125. Philadelphia: American Philosophical Society, with the cooperation of the American Institute of Pacific Relations.
- —— (1955). "Oriental Society in Transition with Special Reference to Pre-Communist and Communist China". The Far Eastern Quarterly. 14 (4): 469–478. doi:10.2307/2941830. JSTOR 2941830. S2CID 165540094.
- —— (1956–1957). "Chinese Society: A Historical Survey". Journal of Asian Studies. 16 (3): 343–364. doi:10.2307/2941230. JSTOR 2941230. S2CID 161204356.
- —— (1957). Oriental Despotism; a Comparative Study of Total Power. New Haven: Yale University Press – via Internet Archive.
- —— (1958). "(Review) Joseph Needham, Science and Civilization in China". American Anthropologist. 60 (2): 398–400. doi:10.1525/aa.1958.60.2.02a00320. JSTOR 665188.
- —— (1960). "A Stronger Oriental Despotism". The China Quarterly (1): 29–34. JSTOR 763342.
- —— (1969). "Results and Problems of the Study of Oriental Despotism". Journal of Asian Studies. 38 (2): 357–365. doi:10.2307/2943008. JSTOR 2943008. S2CID 147186184.

=== Major reviews ===
- Eberhard, Wolfram (1958). "Review of Oriental Despotism: A Comparative Study of Total Power by Karl A. Wittfogel". American Sociological Review. 23 (4): 446–448. doi:10.2307/2088810. JSTOR 2088810.
- Eisenstadt, Shmmuel Noah (1958). "(Review Article) the Study of Oriental Depotisms as Systems of Total Power". Journal of Asian Studies. 17 (3): 435–446. doi:10.2307/2941426. JSTOR 2941426. S2CID 163098192.
- Jones, Stephen B. (1958). "Oriental Despotism (Review)". Geographical Review. 48 (2): 306–308. doi:10.2307/212153. JSTOR 212153.
- Mote, Frederick W. (1961). "The Growth of Chinese Despotism: A Critique of Wittfogel's Theory of Oriental Despotism as Applied to China". Oriens Extremus. 8 (1): 1–41. JSTOR 43382295.
- Needham, Joseph (1959). "(Review) Oriental Despotism". Science and Society. 23 (1): 58–65. JSTOR 40400613.
- Palerm, Angel (1958). "Review". American Antiquity. 23 (4): 440–441. doi:10.2307/276500. JSTOR 276500. S2CID 164066742.
- Pulleyblank, E.G. (1958), "Review of K.A. Wittfogel (1957)", Bulletin of the School of Oriental and African Studies, 21 (3): 657–660, doi:10.1017/s0041977x0006047x, S2CID 162716357
- Sherman, A. V. (1959). "(Review) Oriental Despotism". Commentary. January 1.
- Toynbee, Arnold J. (1958), "Review of Oriental Despotism", The American Political Science Review, 52 (1)
- Venturi, Franco (1968). "Oriental Despotism". Journal of the History of Ideas. 24 (1): 133–142. doi:10.2307/2707864. JSTOR 2707864.
