= Soviet Literature (magazine) =

Soviet literary journal

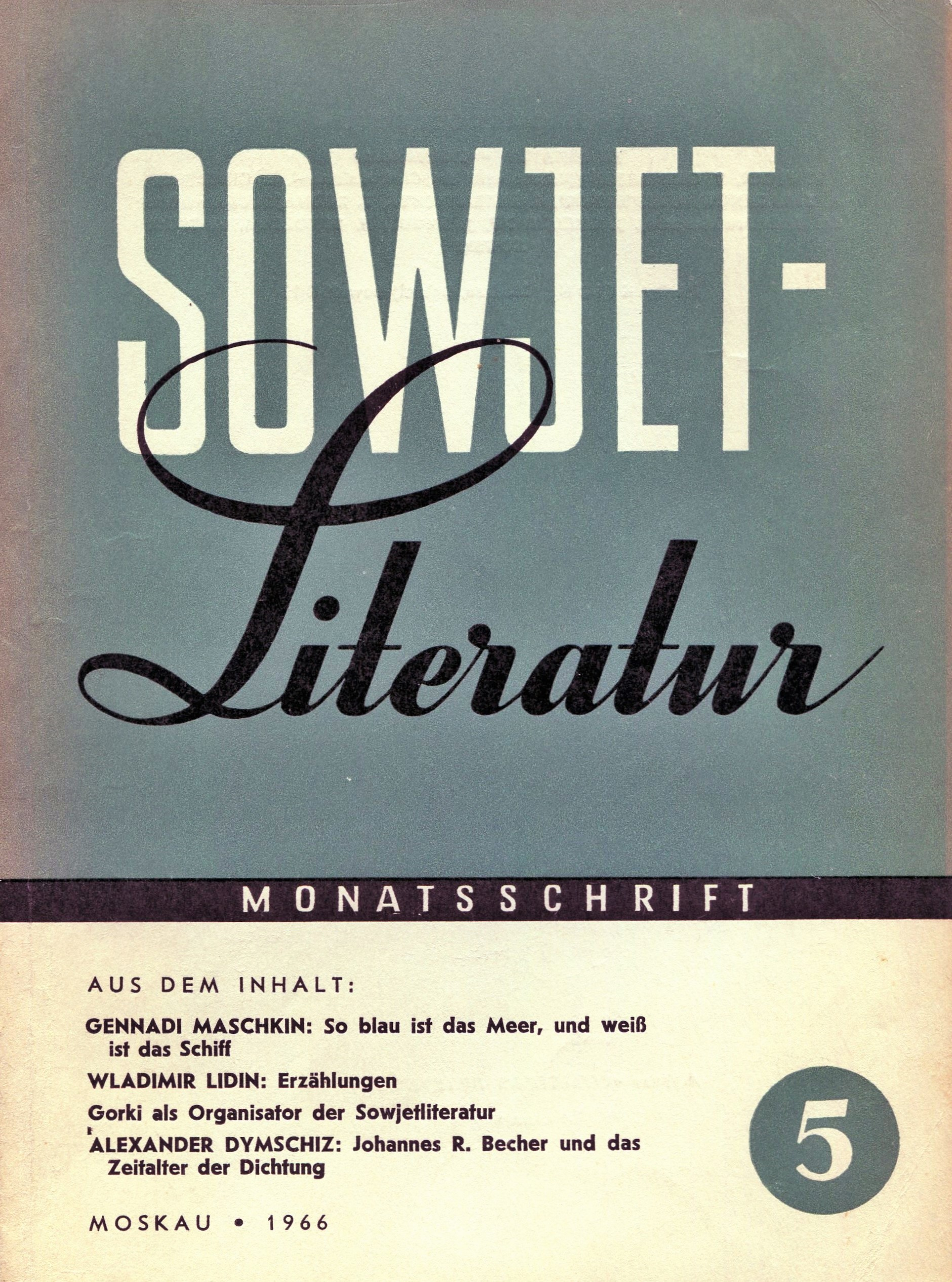
- The cover of a German edition of the journal, 1966
- Language: English

Publication details
- Former names: Literature of the World Revolution; International Literature
- Publisher: Union of Soviet Writers (Soviet Union)
- Frequency: Monthly
- ISO 4: Find out here

Indexing
- ISSN: 0202-1870

Soviet Literature, also known as Sovetskaya Literatura, was a Moscow-based literary magazine, dedicated to disseminating the literature of the Soviet Union, including Russia and its satellite states. The magazine was first published in 1946. It was published on a monthly basis by the Union of Soviet Writers, in several languages including English, French, German, Spanish, Hungarian, Polish, Czech, and Slovak. Earlier incarnations of the magazine in the 1930s and 1940s were titled Literature of the World Revolution and International Literature. Having been renamed in 1946, it ran continuously until 1990, when publication ended with the dissolution of the USSR.

For many years, the editor-in-chief was Savva Dangulov. The last editor-in-chief was Natasha Perova. After the closure of Soviet Literature in 1990, Perova started the magazine Glas in January 1991.
