= Frederick W. Mote =

American historian (1922–2005)

- Born: June 2, 1922; Plainview, Nebraska, U.S.
- Died: February 10, 2005 (aged 82); Aurora, Colorado, U.S.
- Education: University of Nanjing; University of Washington (Ph.D. 1954)
- Scientific career
- Fields: Chinese history
- Workplaces: Princeton University
- Doctoral advisor: Franz H. Michael
- Doctoral students: Gilbert Rozman; Peter Lighte

Chinese name
- Traditional Chinese: 牟復禮
- Simplified Chinese: 牟复礼
Transcriptions
Standard Mandarin
- Hanyu Pinyin: Móu Fùlǐ

Frederick Wade "Fritz" Mote (June 2, 1922 – February 10, 2005) was an American sinologist and a professor of history at Princeton University for nearly 50 years. His research and teaching interests focused on China during the Yuan and Ming dynasties. In collaboration with Denis C. Twitchett and John K. Fairbank he helped create The Cambridge History of China, a monumental overview of the history of China.

== Life ==
Mote was born in Plainview, Nebraska, one of ten children. In 1943 (during World War II) he enlisted in the U.S. Army Air Force but was unable to go to flight school for medical reasons. Due to a college course he took in Chinese language the year before, the Air Force sent Mote to Harvard where he studied Chinese under John K. Fairbank for a year. In 1944, he joined the Office of Strategic Services (the war-time precursor to the CIA) as a noncommissioned officer, serving in the China-Burma-India theater of operations until 1946.

After the war he enrolled in the University of Nanjing and graduated in 1948 with a degree in Chinese history. While the Chinese Communists took over Beijing in 1949, he was working as a language officer for the U.S. Embassy. Forced to leave China in 1950, he continued his studies in the United States at the University of Washington, earning a PhD in 1954 with a dissertation entitled T'ao Tsung-i and His Cho Keng Lu, covering Tao Zongyi and his c. 1366 Nancun Chuogeng Lu. He was hired by Princeton University two years later and remained there until just a few years before his death (he retired from active teaching in 1987). During the 1960s, Mote was able to secure financial resources from the Rockefeller and Ford foundations so the Gest Library could obtain a valuable collection of Chinese documents. He was awarded Guggenheim Fellowships in two different years.

In 1980, Twitchett came to teach at Princeton and the two men worked closely together for the next eight years, co-editing volumes 7 and 8 of The Cambridge History of China, its coverage of the Ming dynasty. Both men had been part of Intelligence agencies during World War II. In addition to his work as an editor, Professor Mote wrote 23 different chapters in the books of the series. Near the end of his life he published the massive book Imperial China: 900–1800 (1999), recapitulating and updating Volumes 5, 6, 7, 8, and 9 of The Cambridge History of China series.

Mote married Ch’en Hsiao-lan in China in 1950. She survived him after a marriage of 55 years and donated his collection of 6,000 books to the Hawthorne-Longfellow Library at Bowdoin College in 2011.

== Works ==
Mote's principal works included:

- T'ao Tsung-i and His Cho Keng Lu, Seattle: University of Washington, 1954, his dissertation about the Yuan and Ming poet and scholar Tao Zongyi's 1366 work Chuogeng Lu.
- "The Growth of Chinese Despotism: A Critique of Wittfogel's Theory of Oriental Despotism as Applied to China". Oriens Extremus. 8 (1): 1–41. 1961, a response to Karl August Wittfogel's Oriental Despotism: A Comparative Study of Total Power.
- The Poet Kao Ch'i, 1335–1374, Princeton: Princeton University Press, 1962, about the Ming poet Gao Qi.
- "The Case for the Integrity of Sinology". The Journal of Asian Studies. 23 (4): 531–534. 1964. doi:10.2307/2050234. JSTOR 2050234. S2CID 163521238.
- Intellectual Foundations of China, New York: Knopf, 1971.
- Hsiao Kung-ch'üan [Xiao Gongquan], A History of Chinese Political Thought, Volume I: From the Beginnings to the Sixth Century AD, Princeton: Princeton University Press, translating Hsiao's 1945 Zhongguo Zhengzhi Sixiang Shi (《中國政治思想史》).
- The Cambridge History of China, Volume 7: The Ming Dynasty, 1368–1644, Parts I & II, Cambridge: Cambridge University Press, 1988, as chief editor with Denis Twitchett.
- Imperial China: 900–1800, Cambridge: Harvard University Press, 1999, an overview of Chinese history from the fall of the Tang to the height of the Qing.
