= Liang Zhiping =

Chinese legal scholar

Liang Zhiping (Chinese: 梁治平; pinyin: Liáng Zhìpíng; born 1959) is a famous legal scholar in China.

== Biography ==
Liang Zhiping received an LL.B degree from Southwest College of Political Science and Law in 1982, and an LL.M degree from Renmin University of China Law School in 1985.

After graduation, he joined the faculty of Renmin University. He later left this university in 1993, and joined the Chinese Art Institute (中国艺术研究院中国文化研究所). He has been a visiting scholar at Harvard University, Columbia University, and the University of Hong Kong, and guest professor at The Chinese University of Hong Kong.

== Works ==
Liang Zhiping have written some influential books for Chinese legal academy such as Xin Bosiren Xinzha (新波斯人信札, coauthor, 1987), etc.
