= K. C. Hsiao =

Chinese historian and political scientist (1897–1981)

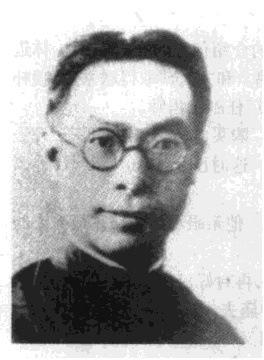
- Born: 29 December 1897; Taihe County, Jiangxi, Qing Empire
- Died: 4 November 1981 (aged 83); Seattle, Washington, United States
- Education: Cornell University (PhD)
- Scientific career
- Fields: Political science Chinese history
- Workplaces: University of Washington; Tsinghua University; Sichuan University; National Taiwan University
- Notable students: David R. Knechtges

Chinese name
- Traditional Chinese: 蕭公權
- Simplified Chinese: 萧公权
Transcriptions
Standard Mandarin
- Hanyu Pinyin: Xiāo Gōngquán
- Wade–Giles: Hsiao^{1} Kung^{1}-ch'üan^{2}
Gan
- Romanization: Hsieu Kung-chüon

K. C. Hsiao (Chinese: 蕭公權; 29 December 1897 – 4 November 1981) was a Chinese historian and political scientist, best known for his contributions to Chinese political science and history.

== Life and career ==
Hsiao first travelled to the United States in 1920 on the Boxer Indemnity Scholarship Program, remaining there for six years and earning a Ph.D. in philosophy from Cornell University in 1926. His dissertation was supervised by George Holland Sabine.

He returned to China and was professor of political science at Yenching University from 1930 to 1932, then at Tsinghua University from 1932 to 1937. With the outbreak of the Second Sino-Japanese War in 1937, he left to teach at Sichuan University and Kwang Hua University (one of the predecessors of present-day East China Normal University). Frustrated by the shortage of research materials produced by the Chinese Civil War, he went to teach at National Taiwan University in 1949, and continued to the United States later that year. He taught at the University of Washington from 1949 to 1968, initially as a visiting professor, and from 1959 as a tenured professor.

Hsiao's magnum opus is his two-volume Zhōngguó zhèngzhǐ sīxiǎng shǐ 中國政治思想史 ["History of Chinese Political Thought"], a work that traces Chinese political thought from its earliest recorded history in the Shang dynasty to his day. An English translation of the first volume by the American Sinologist Frederick W. Mote was published by Princeton University Press in 1979, but the second volume has never been translated into English. Hsiao hoped that the 20th century would come to embody 'liberal socialism', thereby reconciling the political movements of the 18th and 19th centuries.

== Selected works ==
- (in Chinese) Zhongguo zhengzhi sixiangshi 中國政治思想史 ("History of Chinese Political Thought"), 2 vols (1945). Chongqing: Shangwu yinshuguan.

- Volume 1 translated into English by Frederick W. Mote as A History of Chinese Political Thought, Volume 1: From the Beginning to the Sixth Century AD (1979). Princeton: Princeton University Press.

- Rural China: Imperial Control in the Nineteenth Century (1960). Seattle: University of Washington Press.
- (in Chinese) Wenxue jianwang lu 問學諫往錄 (1972). Taipei: Zhuanji wenxue chubanshe.
- Modern China and a New World: Kang Youwei, Reformer and Utopian, 1858–1927 (1975). Seattle, London: University of Washington Press.
- (in Chinese) Xiao Gongquan xiansheng quanji 蕭公權先生全集 ("The Complete Works of Mr. Hsiao Kung-chüan"), 9 volumes (1982). Taipei: Lianjing chubanshe.
