= The Law of Accumulation and Breakdown of the Capitalist System =

1929 book by Henryk Grossman

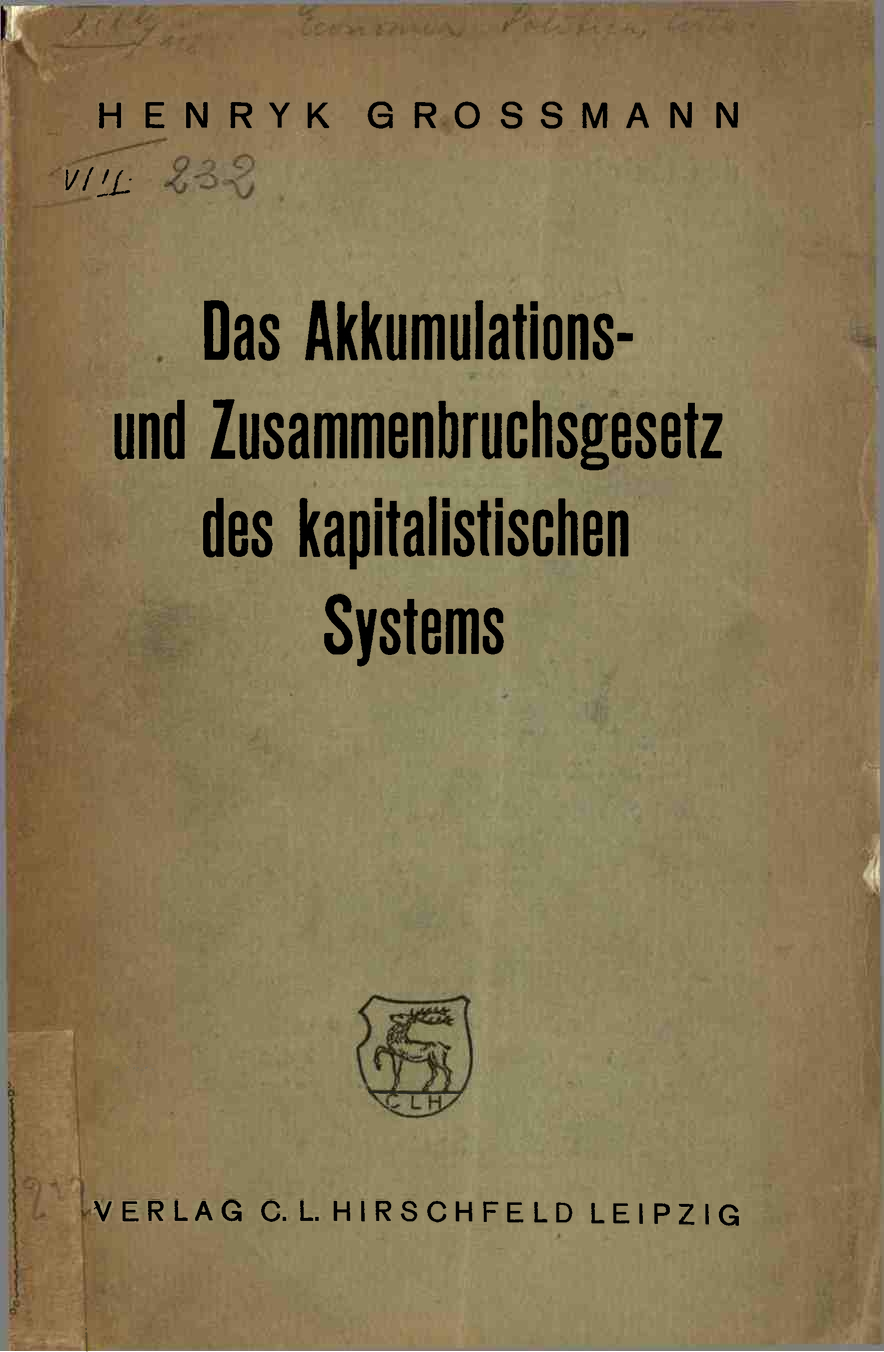
- Cover of the first edition
- Author: Henryk Grossman
- Original title: Das Akkumulations- und Zusammenbruchsgesetz des kapitalistischen Systems (zugleich eine Krisentheorie)
- Language: German
- Series: Schriften des Instituts für Sozialforschung
- Subject: Marxian economics; Crisis theory
- Published: 1929
- Publisher: C. L. Hirschfeld
- Publication place: Leipzig, Germany

The Law of Accumulation and Breakdown of the Capitalist System: Being also a Theory of Crises (German: Das Akkumulations- und Zusammenbruchsgesetz des kapitalistischen Systems (zugleich eine Krisentheorie)) is a 1929 book by the Polish-German Marxist economist Henryk Grossman. Published just months before the Wall Street Crash of 1929, the work became his most famous. It was the first publication in the series of the Institute for Social Research (IfS) in Frankfurt and was a central text of the Frankfurt School's early period.

In the book, Grossman argues that capitalism has an inherent tendency towards economic crisis and breakdown. He grounds this claim in Karl Marx's economic theory, particularly the analysis of capital accumulation and the tendency of the rate of profit to fall. Grossman's main thesis is that, as capital accumulates, the rising organic composition of capital leads to a situation where the mass of surplus value becomes insufficient to sustain the required rate of accumulation, leading to economic breakdown. The work was a polemic against social democratic theorists, whom Grossman called "neo-harmonists", who argued that capitalism could achieve stable, crisis-free growth.

Grossman's work was widely reviewed but mostly rejected by bourgeois, social democratic, and official communist commentators, who often misinterpreted it as a theory of a purely mechanical or automatic economic collapse. Grossman maintained that his theory was not fatalistic, but rather aimed to identify the objective economic conditions that necessitate revolutionary class struggle. The book was influential on the council communist theorist Paul Mattick but was largely forgotten until its rediscovery by the New Left in the late 1960s.

== Background and writing ==
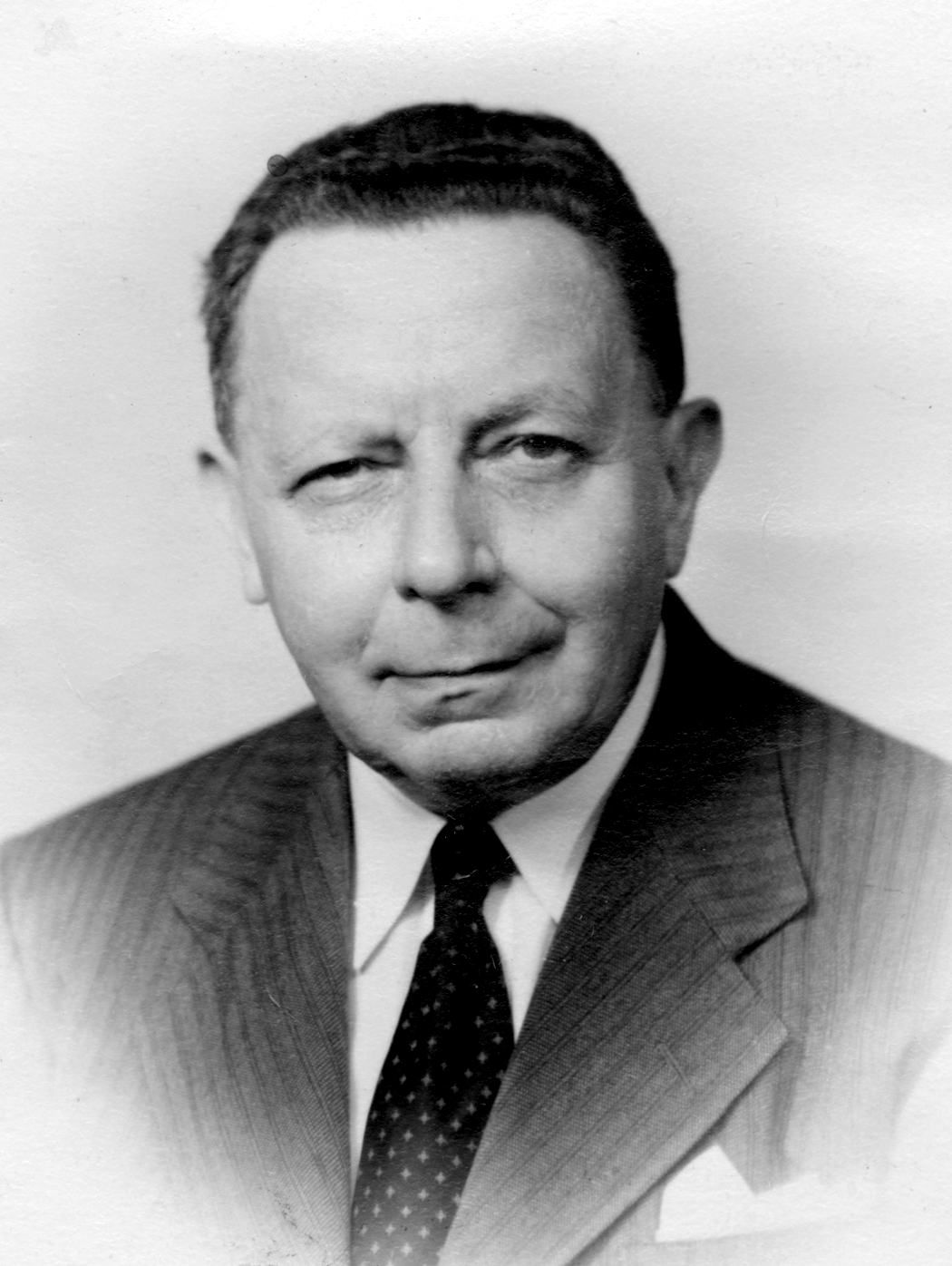
Henryk Grossman

Henryk Grossman began the research that would form the basis of The Law of Accumulation in Warsaw around 1922–1923, building on a 1919 paper he delivered in Kraków which was his first work on Marxist crisis theory. After being forced into a "qualified exile" from Poland in 1925 due to his communist activities, he took up a position at the Institute for Social Research (IfS) in Frankfurt am Main, at the invitation of its director Carl Grünberg. By December 1924, while still in Warsaw, Grossman had discovered that extending Otto Bauer's reproduction schemas over more cycles led to the model's breakdown, a discovery closely associated with his recovery of Marx's theory. He completed a large manuscript, which he finished in November 1926 at the IfS.The Law of Accumulation, published in 1929, was drawn from this larger work and was a companion piece to Grossman's essay "The Change in the Original Plan for Marx’s Capital and its Causes", published the same year.

The book was conceived as a reconstruction of what Grossman saw as the lost revolutionary core of Marx's economic theory. In the book's introduction, he states his aim is to reconstruct Marx's theory of breakdown, which he believed formed the "cornerstone of Marx's economic system". It was a direct polemical intervention into the theoretical debates that had dominated the Second International. Grossman's main targets were the "neo-harmonists"—social democratic theorists like Rudolf Hilferding, Karl Kautsky, and Otto Bauer—who had refuted Eduard Bernstein's revisionism by arguing that Marx had no theory of economic collapse.

Grossman sought to demonstrate, against them, that capitalism was inherently prone to crisis and breakdown, a view he considered central to Marxism. He also engaged extensively with Rosa Luxemburg's alternative breakdown theory presented in her 1913 book The Accumulation of Capital. While Grossman praised Luxemburg for insisting on capitalism's "absolute limits" against the neo-harmonists, he rejected her underconsumptionist theory, which located the barrier to accumulation in the problem of realizing surplus value in non-capitalist markets, rather than in the sphere of production. According to his biographer Rick Kuhn, Grossman's work on economics was meant to "make the Marxist case for revolutionary working-class action" and complemented Vladimir Lenin's recovery of the revolutionary politics of Marxism.

== Synopsis ==
The Law of Accumulation is structured according to Grossman's understanding of Marx's method of successive approximation, moving from a highly abstract model to progressively more concrete levels of analysis. After surveying previous Marxist discussions of capitalist collapse, the book's second chapter presents the breakdown tendency under a series of simplifying assumptions. The third chapter introduces "counter-tendencies" by relaxing these assumptions. The concluding observations connect the economic tendency to breakdown with the class struggle and revolution.

=== The breakdown model ===
Grossman's central argument is based on a critique and modification of a reproduction scheme developed by Otto Bauer. Bauer had used Marx's reproduction schemes from Volume II of Capital to argue that stable capitalist growth was possible indefinitely, so long as the correct proportions between different sectors of the economy were maintained and accumulation was adapted to population growth. Grossman demonstrates that when Bauer's own, more realistic assumptions are followed to their logical conclusion over a longer period, the system necessarily breaks down.

The core of the model is the effect of capital accumulation on the tendency of the rate of profit to fall. Following Marx, Grossman shows that capitalist competition and the drive for increased productivity lead to a rising organic composition of capital: capitalists invest proportionally more in constant capital (machinery, equipment, raw materials) than in variable capital (wages). Since only living labour (purchased by variable capital) produces new value and surplus value, this shift in the technical composition of capital causes the rate of profit (the ratio of surplus value to total invested capital) to decline.

Grossman argues that while the rate of profit falls, the total mass of profit can continue to rise for a period. However, a point is eventually reached where the increase in the mass of profit is no longer sufficient to cover the investment required for the continued expansion of capital at the given rate. At this point, there is not enough surplus value to be reinvested while also providing for the consumption of the capitalists. By the 35th year in Grossman's extension of Bauer's model, capitalist consumption falls to zero, and a reserve army of labour emerges as accumulation can no longer absorb the growing population. Accumulation stalls, and the system enters a state of breakdown. Grossman developed a formula to calculate this breakdown point, identifying it as the "decisively important" factor in Marx's theory of crisis. He stresses that this limit is specific to capitalism: breakdown occurs not because of an absolute inability to produce goods, but because capital cannot be "valorized" or produce a sufficient rate of profit.

=== The formula ===
Meaning of the symbols

c = constant capital. Initial value = c_{o}. Value after j years = c_{j}
v = variable capital. Initial value = v_{o}. Value after j years = v_{j}
s = rate of surplus value (written as a percentage of v)
a_{c} = rate of accumulation of constant capital c
a_{v} = rate of accumulation of variable capital v
k = consumption share of capitalists

S = mass of surplus value, being: $k + {a_{c} \cdot c\over 100} + {a_{v} \cdot v\over 100}$

Ω = organic composition of capital, or c:v
(Correction with respect to Grossman's text:
From the formula below it follows that Grossman means by Ω the initial value of the organic composition of capital $c_0$:$v_0$)
j = number of years

Further, let
$r = 1 + {a_c\over 100}$
and let
$w = 1 + {a_v\over 100}$

Accumulation to breakdown

After j years at the assumed rate of accumulation a_{c}, the constant capital c reaches the level: $c_j = c_{o} \cdot r^j$ At the assumed rate of accumulation a_{v}, the variable capital v reaches the level: $v_j = v_{o} \cdot w^j$ The year after (j + 1) accumulation is continued as usual according to the formula:
$S = k + {c_{o} \cdot r^{j} \cdot a_c \over 100} + {v_{o} \cdot w^{j} \cdot a_v \over 100} = {s \cdot v_{o} \cdot w^j \over 100}$

From which we see: $k = {v_{o} \cdot w^{j} (s - a_{v})\over 100} - {c_{o} \cdot r^{j} \cdot a_c\over 100}$

For k to be greater than 0, it is necessary that:
${v_{o} \cdot w^{j} (s - a_{v})\over 100} > {c_{o} \cdot r^{j} \cdot a_c\over 100}$
k = 0 for a year n, if:
${v_{o} \cdot w^{n} (s - a_{v})\over 100} = {c_{o} \cdot r^{n} \cdot a_c\over 100}$

The timing of the absolute crisis is given by the point at which the consumption share of the entrepreneur vanishes completely, long after it has already started to decline. This means: $\left({r \over w}\right)^n = {s - a_v\over \Omega \cdot a_c}$

whence n = ${log \left( \dfrac{s - a_v}{\Omega \cdot a_c} \right)} \over {log \left( \dfrac{100 + a_c}{100 + a_v} \right)}$

This is a real number as long as s > a_{v}

Starting from time-point n, the mass of surplus value S is not sufficient to valorize c and ‘’v’’, all else being equal.

=== Counter-tendencies and class struggle ===
Grossman dedicates a chapter to the counter-tendencies that offset the tendency of the rate of profit to fall, converting an absolute breakdown into periodic crises. These factors, largely drawn from Capital, Volume III, include:

- The cheapening of the elements of constant and variable capital through increased productivity and devaluation.
- The depression of wages below the value of labour-power and increasing the rate of surplus value (exploitation).
- The growth of new, less capital-intensive industries and the renewal of fixed capital.
- Competition, which leads to the centralisation and concentration of capital.
- Foreign trade and unequal exchange, through which surplus value is transferred from less-developed to more-developed countries.
- The export of capital to regions with higher profit rates, a key feature of imperialism.
- The destruction of capital values during wars.

These counteracting forces do not eliminate the underlying breakdown tendency but slow its development and modify its effects. However, they become progressively weaker as capitalism develops.

The concluding observations connect the economic theory to political practice. Grossman argued against the accusation of fatalism or "automatic collapse" by showing how the breakdown tendency manifests through and intensifies the class struggle. As he wrote later in a survey of Marxism, "The point of breakdown theory is that the revolutionary action of the proletariat only receives its most powerful impetus from the objective convulsion of the established system". As accumulation progresses, the room for both rising wages and a sufficient rate of profit shrinks. The system reaches an "objective limit of trade union action", where any significant wage rise for workers directly threatens the profitability necessary for accumulation. At this point, Grossman states, "every major economic struggle necessarily becomes a question of the existence of capitalism, a question of political power." The breakdown tendency thus creates the objective conditions for a revolutionary situation, which must be "utilized" by the conscious, organized action of the working class to overthrow the system. The revolution is therefore not an automatic event but the product of the interaction between objective economic pressures and subjective political struggle.

== Publication and translations ==
The book was first published in Leipzig in 1929 by C. L. Hirschfeld Verlag as the first volume in the Schriften des Instituts für Sozialforschung (Writings of the Institute for Social Research). The Institute's director, Carl Grünberg, edited the volume.

The book soon gained an international audience. A Japanese translation, organised by Grossman's friend, the Marxist scholar Yoshitaro Hirano, appeared in 1932. An abridged English translation by Jairus Banaji was first made in Bombay in 1979 and published by Pluto Press in 1992. This version is missing the final chapter of the original German edition, which discusses the relationship between economic breakdown and class struggle. A Spanish edition was published in Mexico in 1979, and an Italian edition in 1977. A full English translation was published in 2021 as the third volume of Henryk Grossman Works.

== Reception and legacy ==
The Law of Accumulation quickly attracted widespread attention and was reviewed in mainstream, social democratic, and communist journals across the German-speaking world. The reception was, however, almost universally hostile. Critics from all camps accused Grossman of propounding a "mechanical" or "automatic" theory of capitalist collapse that neglected the role of class struggle. Prominent social democratic critics included Alfred Braunthal and Helene Bauer. Within the communist movement, the official line was articulated by Jenő Varga, who rejected Grossman's theory. Council communists such as Anton Pannekoek and Karl Korsch also criticised the book, with Pannekoek repeating Varga's arguments and Korsch dismissing crisis theory as a "Sorelian myth".

Grossman responded to these criticisms in later writings and in correspondence, particularly with Paul Mattick, consistently denying that he had advanced a fatalistic or automatic theory of collapse. In unpublished notes from 1929–1932, he defended his work against Braunthal and Bauer. He argued that his theory provided the necessary materialist foundation for revolutionary practice, in contrast to both the reformism of the social democrats and the voluntarism he saw in some communist tendencies.

Despite the initial rejection, Grossman's work had a lasting influence. Paul Mattick became a lifelong exponent of Grossman's crisis theory. The book also found an early audience among Japanese Marxists. After the Second World War, Grossman's work was largely condemned or ignored in official Stalinist economics. It was rediscovered in the late 1960s by activists in the West German New Left and has since been influential in Marxist crisis theory, particularly in the English-speaking world following the publication of the abridged English translation in 1992. Biographer Rick Kuhn concludes that the book, along with the contemporary work of Vladimir Lenin and Georg Lukács, was a major contribution to the "recovery of Marxism as the theory and practice of working-class self-emancipation" from the mechanical orthodoxies of the Second International.
