= Henryk Grossman =

Polish-German Marxist economist (1881–1950)

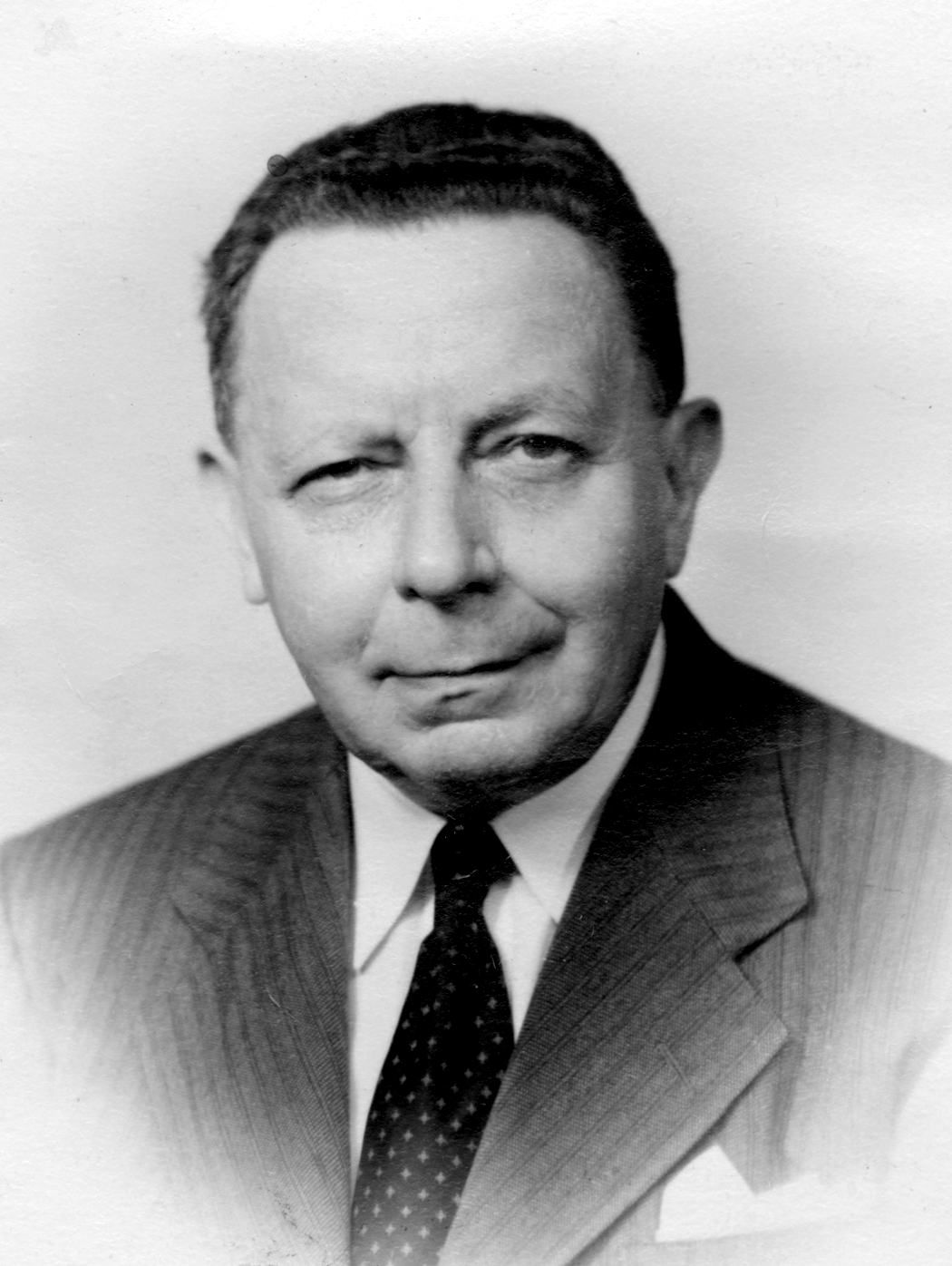
- Grossman c. 1940s
- Born: Chaskel Grossman; 14 April 1881; Kraków, Galicia, Austria-Hungary
- Died: 24 November 1950 (aged 69); Leipzig, East Germany
- Political party: Jewish Social Democratic Party in Galicia; Communist Party of Poland
- Movement: Marxism

Academic background
- Education: Jagiellonian University; University of Vienna
- Doctoral advisor: Carl Grünberg
- Influences: Karl Marx

Academic work
- Discipline: Marxian economics; Economic history
- School or tradition: Frankfurt School
- Institutions: Free Polish University (1922–1925); Institute for Social Research (1925–1944); University of Leipzig (1949–1950)
- Notable ideas: Crisis theory

Signature
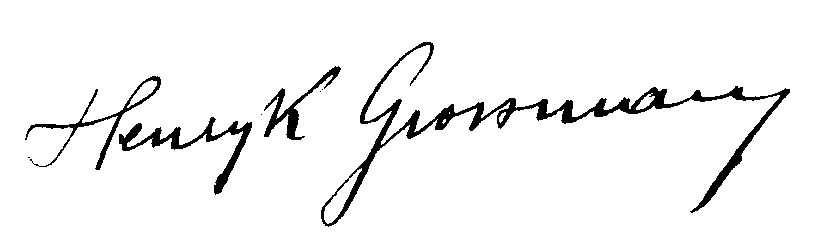

Henryk Grossman (Polish: [ˈɡrɔsman]; born Chaskel Grossman; 14 April 1881 – 24 November 1950) was a Polish-German Marxist economist, historian, and political activist. Born in Kraków to an assimilated Jewish family, he became a leading figure in the Jewish socialist movement in Galicia before World War I, leading the Jewish Social Democratic Party (JSDP). After the war, he became a member of the Communist Party of Poland.

Forced into exile in the mid-1920s due to political persecution, Grossman joined the Institute for Social Research (the Frankfurt School) in Germany. There he published his most famous work, The Law of Accumulation and Breakdown of the Capitalist System (1929), a treatise that revived Karl Marx's theory of economic crisis. In this book, Grossman argued that capitalism has an inherent tendency towards breakdown, stemming from the rising organic composition of capital and the consequent fall in the rate of profit.

After fleeing Nazi Germany in 1933, Grossman lived in exile in Paris, London, and New York, continuing his association with the Frankfurt School until a falling out in the 1940s. He remained a committed, though not always orthodox, supporter of the Soviet Union. In 1949, he accepted a professorship at the University of Leipzig in East Germany, where he spent the final year of his life. His work, largely rejected by both social democratic and communist orthodoxy during his lifetime, was rediscovered in the late 1960s and has since become a central text in Marxist crisis theory. His analysis of capitalism's "final breakdown" has been seen by some modern scholars as "stunningly prescient".

== Early life and education (1881–1905) ==
Henryk Grossman was born on 14 April 1881 in Kraków, then part of the Austro-Hungarian province of Galicia, to a prosperous, assimilated Polish-Jewish family. His father, Herz, was a successful small industrialist and mine owner. The family was increasingly assimilated into Polish high culture; at home they spoke Polish, and young Chaskel, as he was named at birth, became known by the Polish "Henryk", a name change that epitomised his parents' assimilation into polite Polish society.

Grossman attended the St. James academic high school (gimnazjum), where the language of instruction was Polish. He received a liberal education and excelled in French. His father died in 1896, when Grossman was fifteen. Around this time, on May Day 1896, he became a socialist after witnessing a demonstration of workers in Kraków. He recalled being outraged by the presence of Habsburg soldiers and seeing about 500 unarmed workmen, whose arguments for socialism impressed and moved him. He was angered by the fear and injustice shown by the authorities and his own social class, who had brought in troops and stockpiled supplies in fear of the workers. He began to read socialist literature and, by his own account, "rapidly mastered all the Marxist literature".

After graduating from the gimnazjum in 1900, Grossman enrolled in the law and philosophy faculties of Kraków's Jagiellonian University. He became involved in radical student politics, joining the socialist student organization Ruch (Movement). He identified with the internationalist Marxism of the Social Democracy of the Kingdom of Poland and Lithuania (SDKPiL), led by Rosa Luxemburg, rather than the more nationalist Polish Socialist Party (PPS). Through Ruch, he participated in workers' education, gave talks on topics such as anti-Semitism, and helped organize a successful conference for graduating high school students in 1901. His activism brought him into contact with key figures in Polish socialism, and by the end of the decade, he had developed a reputation as a theorist within the Galician social democratic movement.

== Political activism in Galicia (1902–1908) ==
The socialist movement in Galicia was dominated by the Polish Social Democratic Party of Galicia (PPSD), which was formally Marxist but increasingly influenced by Polish nationalism. While initially a member, Grossman became a critic of the party leadership's assimilationist attitude towards the Yiddish-speaking Jewish working class.

Starting around 1902, Grossman focused his political work on organizing Jewish workers in Kraków. He learned Yiddish so he could agitate in the working-class Jewish quarter of Kazimierz, where he went to cafés to talk to workers and "weaned [them] away to Socialism". On 20 December 1902, he was a key figure in the establishment of the Jewish workers' association Postęp (Progress), serving as its secretary. The association provided a forum for political and educational discussions and became a base for organizing branches of social democratic trade unions.

Tensions between Grossman's group and the PPSD leadership came to a head in late 1904. Grossman, aligned with the left wing of the party, opposed the leadership's decision to form a fraternal alliance with the nationalist PPS. When Grossman became the editor of a new internationalist student journal, Zjednoczenie (Unification), the PPSD newspaper Naprzód attacked him as a "swindler". After a series of heated exchanges and meetings, the party executive formally expelled Grossman on 26 February 1905. However, Grossman had built a significant base of support among Jewish workers in Kraków, and at a mass meeting of 300 party members on 4 March, the PPSD leader Ignacy Daszyński was forced to broker a compromise. Grossman was readmitted to the party after agreeing to resign from Zjednoczenie.

The "Grossman affair" demonstrated both the strength of his support among Jewish workers—he was now "known to every conscious Jewish proletarian in Krakow"—and the irreconcilable differences with the PPSD leadership. On 1 May 1905, Grossman led a split from the PPSD, proclaiming the formation of the Jewish Social Democratic Party of Galicia (JSDP). Jakob Bros, a close collaborator, announced the new party's formation at a rally of over 2,000 Jewish workers in Kraków. The JSDP was founded as a party "arising not against the Polish or Ruthenian parties, but alongside them".

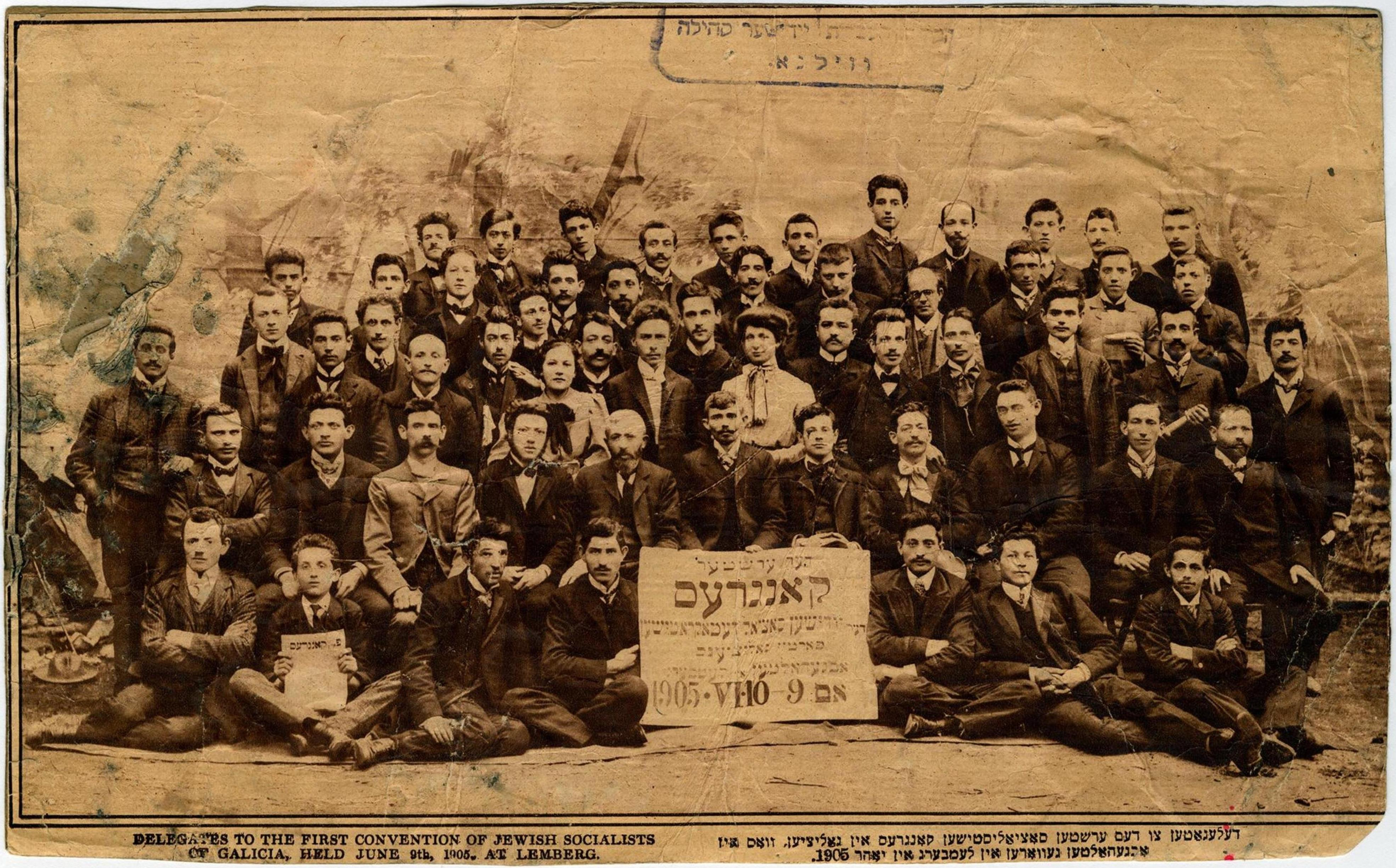
First Congress of the Jewish Social Democratic Party of Galicia in Lemberg, 1905. Grossman is second from the right in the front row.

Grossman became the leader, secretary, and chief theorist of the JSDP. He authored its founding manifesto, "What do we want?", which declared that the party would not just tolerate other nationalities but actively support their right to self-determination. In January 1905, he had published a pamphlet, The Proletariat and the Jewish Question, which set out the party's theoretical justification. The JSDP grew rapidly, from around 2,000 members at its founding to 2,800 by May 1906. The party was active in the mass struggles for universal suffrage across the Austrian empire in 1905–1906. While committed to the campaign, Grossman maintained a revolutionary perspective, stating: "We regard barricades and voting slips as good in the same way. They are only means to our goal... The mass strike, the last step on the legal path is the first step of the revolution!" In 1907, he published his most substantial work of this period, Bundism in Galicia, which analyzed the history of the Jewish workers' movement and defended the JSDP's existence. In it, he argued that socialism and national liberation were about the mutual transformation of the working class and its circumstances through class struggle, an early recovery of Marx's concept of working-class self-emancipation.

== Academic career and World War I (1908–1918) ==
In late 1908, Grossman left Kraków for Vienna, stepping back from full-time political activism to pursue an academic career. On 1 December 1908, he married Janina Reicher, the daughter of a wealthy Polish-Jewish businessman. Grossman began studying at the University of Vienna under the socialist legal historian Carl Grünberg, who became his academic patron and close friend. He also started a legal apprenticeship to provide a fall-back profession, but his main focus was on economic history.

His major research project, undertaken as part of Grünberg's long-term study of Austrian reform, was an examination of the trade and industrial policy of the Habsburg monarchy in Galicia between 1772 and 1790. This work culminated in the publication of Austria's Trade Policy with Regard to Galicia during the Reform Period of 1772–1790 in 1914. In the book, Grossman challenged Polish nationalist historiography, arguing that Galicia's economic backwardness was a legacy of the Polish feudal system, not Austrian rule. He contended that the Habsburg reforms had been beneficial for the majority of the population and that their main flaw had been discrimination against the Jews, who were a dynamic economic element in the province. Although written in the language of the historical school of economics, the book's analysis was framed by historical materialism.

During this period, Grossman lived in Paris with his wife and their first son, Jean, from 1910. He remained a member of the JSDP executive and maintained contact with the party, but was no longer its central leader. When World War I broke out, Grossman was conscripted into the Austro-Hungarian army in February 1915. After a short period of combat on the Eastern Front in 1916, his skills as a statistician and economist were put to use. He was appointed to the Scientific Committee for the War Economy and served as its representative to the General Government in Lublin. In 1917, he was recalled to Vienna to work as a consultant on the economic aspects of the peace negotiations with Soviet Russia at Brest-Litovsk. During the war, his mother destroyed many of his political documents for fear of police visits.

== Communist academic in Poland (1919–1925) ==
Following the collapse of Austria-Hungary and the re-establishment of an independent Poland, Grossman was blocked from a planned career in the Austrian civil service due to nationalist purges that designated him a "Pole". He returned to Poland in 1919 and took up a senior position at the newly founded Polish Central Statistical Office (GUS) in Warsaw, where he was put in charge of preparations for the country's first population census.

The revolutionary wave that ended the war profoundly influenced Grossman. In 1920, he joined the clandestine Communist Workers' Party of Poland (KPRP), where he was regarded as one of the party's "three wise men". In June 1921, he resigned from GUS because, as his mentor Grünberg later stated, "he was not prepared to accept the fudging of the census results in favor of the Polish majority and against the interests of the minorities."

In 1922, Grossman was appointed professor of economic policy at the Free University of Poland (WWP) in Warsaw. He also became the chairman of the communist-led People's University (PU), a major institution for workers' education. Throughout this period, he was active as a Communist academic, teaching courses on Marxist theory, translating Marx's writings into Polish, and writing articles for the party's legal press, including a critique of reformism which explained the failure of the Second International as a result of the influence of a privileged "labour aristocracy". This activity brought him under the scrutiny of the political police. Between 1922 and 1925, he was arrested and imprisoned five times for "hostility to the state". During these imprisonments, he was suspended from his university post without pay. Following a raid on a Communist Party secretariat being held in an apartment rented in his name in August 1924, and after prominent scholars intervened on his behalf, Grossman was released on bail and made an unofficial deal with the authorities for a form of qualified exile.

== Frankfurt School and major work (1925–1933) ==
In November 1925, Grossman left Warsaw for Frankfurt am Main, Germany, to join the Institute for Social Research (IfS), later known as the Frankfurt School, at the invitation of its director, Carl Grünberg. The well-funded institute provided a favorable environment for scholarly Marxist research, and Grossman became one of its most prominent members.

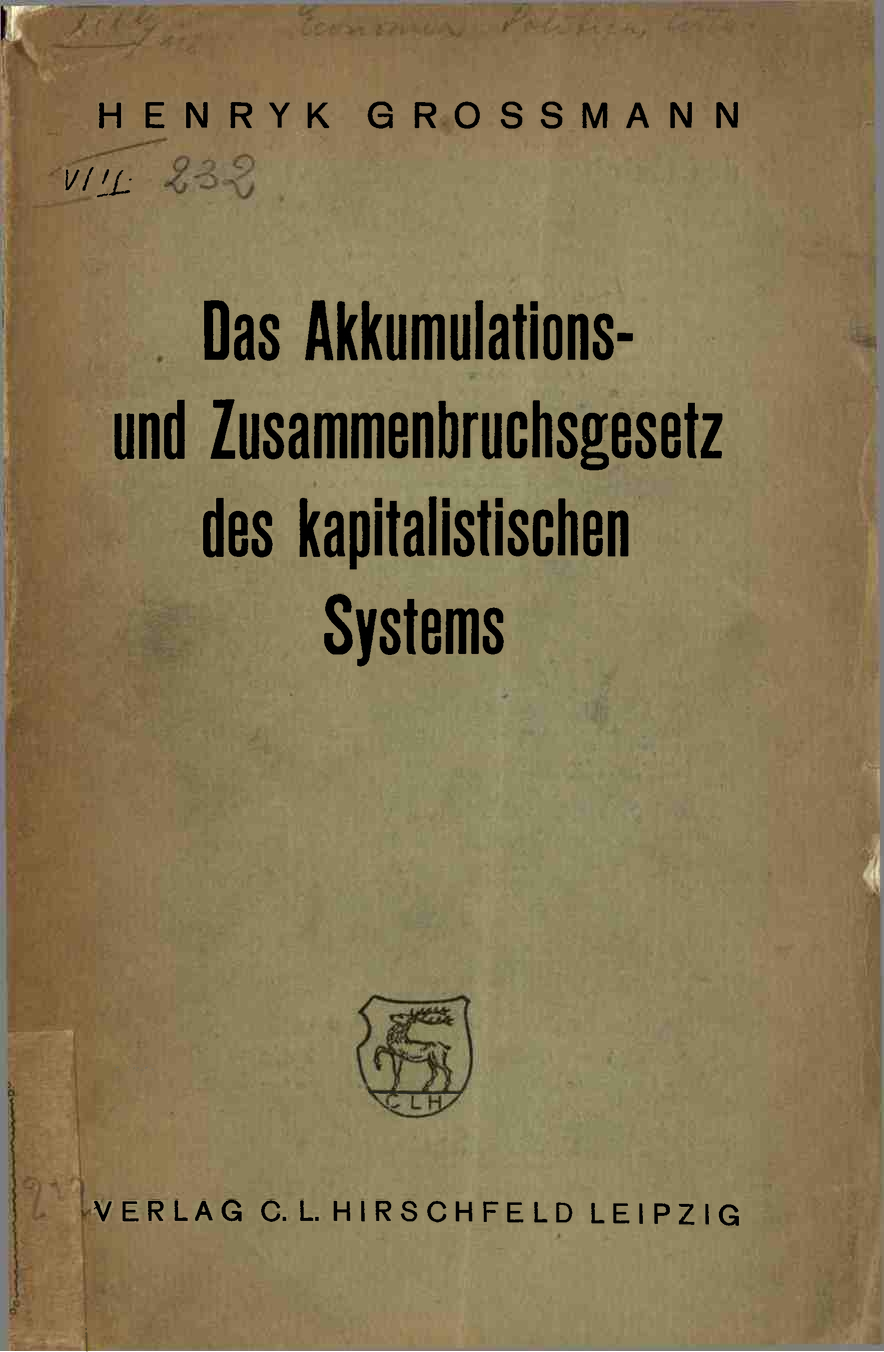
Cover of The Law of Accumulation and Breakdown of the Capitalist System (1929)

His main work at the institute was the completion of a major study on Marxist economic theory he had begun in the early 1920s. This was published in 1929 as The Law of Accumulation and Breakdown of the Capitalist System, the first volume in the institute's monograph series. The book was a detailed reconstruction and defense of Karl Marx's theory of economic crisis, based on what Grossman termed Marx's method of "successive approximation". Grossman argued against both social democratic "neo-harmonists" like Rudolf Hilferding and Otto Bauer, who believed capitalism could achieve a stable equilibrium, and against other breakdown theorists like Rosa Luxemburg, whose theory he found flawed.

Grossman's central thesis was that capitalism possesses an inherent and unavoidable tendency toward breakdown. He based this argument on Marx's analysis of the tendency of the rate of profit to fall. Using a reproduction scheme developed from Otto Bauer's work, Grossman demonstrated that as capital accumulates, the organic composition of capital (the ratio of constant capital to variable capital) rises. This causes the rate of profit to fall. Beyond a certain point, the mass of profit, while still growing, becomes insufficient to sustain the required rate of accumulation. Capitalists are then forced to reduce workers' wages or their own consumption to continue investment. This dynamic leads to a situation of "absolute overaccumulation" where there is not enough surplus value to continue the accumulation process, resulting in economic breakdown. Grossman stressed that this was not an automatic, mechanical process but an objective tendency that created the conditions for revolution. The outcome, he argued, would be decided by the class struggle between workers and capitalists.

The book appeared months before the Wall Street Crash of 1929 and attracted widespread attention and controversy in the German-speaking world, with reviews appearing in mainstream, social democratic, and communist publications. Most were hostile, often misrepresenting his theory as a fatalistic prediction of automatic collapse.

== Exile (1933–1949) ==
When the Nazis came to power in January 1933, Grossman, as a prominent Marxist of Jewish origin, was in immediate danger. He left Germany for Paris on 4 March 1933. The institute's Frankfurt office was searched and sealed by the police soon after, and Grossman's license to teach was formally withdrawn in December 1933 on the grounds that he was not an Aryan. Two chests of his manuscripts and a large part of his library were confiscated by the German police and only partly recovered after a year and a half of effort.

Grossman lived in Paris, working with the institute's branch office there, until moving to London in January 1936. In October 1937, he moved to New York, where the IfS had re-established itself at Columbia University. During his exile, Grossman's political views shifted. After the defeat of the German workers' movement, he became deeply critical of the Communist Party of Germany (KPD) and the Comintern, writing to Paul Mattick in March 1933 that the KPD leadership were "mere puppets" installed by Moscow. He was initially sympathetic to Leon Trotsky's calls for a new International. However, between late 1935 and 1936, influenced by the rise of fascism and the events of the Spanish Civil War, he became an uncritical supporter of the Soviet Union and its Popular Front strategy, a position he explained to Mattick by arguing that "a defeat of the Soviet Union would throw the workers’ movement back 50 years."

His relationship with the new director of the IfS, Max Horkheimer, and his inner circle was initially cordial but became strained. There were growing intellectual differences, as Horkheimer's "Critical Theory" moved away from historical materialism and Marxist economics. Financial difficulties at the institute and Grossman's staunchly pro-Soviet stance after the Molotov–Ribbentrop Pact exacerbated tensions. In April 1941, Grossman had a confrontation with Friedrich Pollock over a pay cut and his marginalization within the institute's projects. He withdrew from most collaboration but did not resign. In March 1944, Horkheimer formally severed the institute's relationship with him, though Grossman continued to receive a "voluntary fellowship".

Despite his isolation from the institute, Grossman remained intellectually productive. He developed his critique of mainstream economics in "The Evolutionist Revolt against Classical Economics" (1943) and continued his research. During this time, he formed a close friendship with the Australian novelist Christina Stead and her husband, the writer and Marxist economist William J. Blake.

== Final years in East Germany (1949–1950) ==
As the Cold War intensified in the United States, Grossman, who was being monitored by the FBI, decided to return to Europe. In 1949, he accepted a professorship in political economy at the Leipzig University in the newly founded German Democratic Republic (East Germany). He saw this as an opportunity to contribute to the "construction of a new better Germany". He arrived in Leipzig in February 1949 and was warmly received, being regarded by the authorities in Saxony as a major intellectual figure.

Grossman's health, however, was already failing. He was suffering from Parkinson's disease, and a stroke he had suffered in New York had affected the right side of his face. Although he threw himself into his new role, his lectures were difficult for students to understand because his voice was very soft and he trembled. In March 1950, after an operation, his health deteriorated further. His doctors gave him less than a year to live. Henryk Grossman died on 24 November 1950, at the age of 69.

== Legacy ==
During his lifetime, Grossman's work was largely marginalized. His crisis theory was attacked by social democratic theorists for its revolutionary conclusions, and by the emerging Stalinist orthodoxy for its deviation from approved dogma. After his death, his work was ignored in East Germany, where no stone marked his grave and none of his books were published.

Grossman's legacy is his "recovery of Marxism". His major contribution was the restoration of Marx's theory of capitalist crisis to a central place in Marxist thought. He insisted on the methodological importance of abstraction and the dialectical relationship between value and use-value in Marx's economic theory. He demonstrated that capitalism's tendency to breakdown was not an automatic process but an objective trend that created the necessity for revolutionary class struggle. His work was rediscovered in the late 1960s, first by activists in the West German New Left. An abridged English translation of The Law of Accumulation appeared in 1992, making his ideas accessible to a wider audience. According to his biographer Rick Kuhn, he successfully "restored fundamental elements of Marx's economic theory and developed them". For Ted Reese, Grossman's contribution makes him "as important to today’s burgeoning revolutionary movement as Lenin, Mao, Luxemburg, Lukács and other revolutionaries".
