= Friedrich Pollock =

German social scientist and philosopher

- Born: 22 May 1894; Freiburg im Breisgau
- Died: 16 December 1970 (aged 76); Montagnola

Academic background
- Education: University of Frankfurt
- Thesis: Zur Geldtheorie von Karl Marx (1923)
- Doctoral advisor: Siegfried Budge

Academic work
- Notable works: The Economic and Social Consequences of Automation
- Notable ideas: state capitalism

Friedrich Pollock (/ˈpɒlək/; German: [ˈpɔlɔk]; also Frederick Pollock; pen names Kurt Baumann, Karl Baumann; 22 May 1894 – 16 December 1970) was a German social scientist and philosopher. He was one of the founders of the Institute for Social Research in Frankfurt am Main, and a member of the Frankfurt School of critical theory.

== Career ==
Friedrich Pollock was born to a leather factory owner in Freiburg im Breisgau. Pollock's Jewish-born father turned away from Judaism, became assimilated, and raised his son accordingly. In 1911, the family moved to Stuttgart, where Pollock began vocational training in commerce. At the school, he met Max Horkheimer, with whom he struck a lifelong friendship. Sent by their parents to study languages and textile production techniques in Belgium, France and England, Pollock and Horkheimer pursued a bohemian lifestyle while developing a common interest in literature and philosophy. They returned to Germany from London together at the outbreak of World War I in 1914. After serving at the rear of the Imperial German Army between 1916 and 1918, Pollock took his Abitur in Munich alongside Horkheimer in 1919. He expressed support for the short-lived Bavarian Soviet Republic of spring 1919 and reportedly left his passport to a Russian revolutionary during the republic's final days, but his personal involvement in the events is thought to have been limited. In the fall of 1919, he met and befriended Felix Weil, the son of the German-Argentine grain magnate Hermann Weil. Pollock went on to study economy, sociology and philosophy at the LMU Munich, where he attended the lectures of Max Weber, at the University of Freiburg, where he spent a semester with Edmund Husserl, and at the University of Frankfurt, always with Horkheimer. He came to manage his friend's affairs, preferring to stay in the background himself.

In March 1923, Pollock completed his doctoral thesis on Karl Marx's money theory at the University of Frankfurt's Faculty of Economic and Social Sciences, supervised by Siegfried Budge. In May 1923, he joined Karl Korsch, György Lukács, Richard Sorge and Karl August Wittfogel at the first annual Marxist Work Week conference at Ilmenau in Thuringia, financed by the Weils. Helped by the Argentine sponsors, he also co-founded the Institute for Social Research at Frankfurt together with Horkheimer, Theodor W. Adorno, Walter Benjamin and Leo Löwenthal, publicly inaugurated in June 1924.

Between 1927 and 1928, Pollock traveled to the Soviet Union in honor of the tenth anniversary of the October Revolution. His research there led to his habilitation treatise on the Attempts at Planned Economy in the Soviet Union 1917–1927 (1929). Thereafter he took a post as lecturer at the University of Frankfurt, replacing Carl Grünberg as acting director of the Institute for Social Research from 1929 to 1930. Prior to the Nazi seizure of power, Pollock had used his contacts in the International Labour Organization to establish a Geneva branch of the Institute for Social Research. In 1933, Pollock and Horkheimer moved into exile, first in Geneva, then to London and Paris, reaching New York City in 1934.

At the turn of 1941, Pollock was appointed as advisor to the Board of Economic Warfare and the War Production Board, newly created by President Franklin D. Roosevelt. He co-founded the Research Bureau for Post-War Economics, which supplied policy reports to the White House. In February 1943 and in early 1944, he met with President Roosevelt to discuss plans for a post-war economic order in Germany. In 1943, Pollock, working closely with Paul Massing, took part in negotiating sponsorship by the American Jewish Committee for a research project on political antisemitism. From September 1943, he advised the economic section of the Office of Strategic Services, albeit without receiving a security clearance.

In 1950 Pollock resettled in Frankfurt and was reappointed director of the reestablished Institute for Social Research in the following year. From 1951 to 1958, he was professor of economics and sociology at the University of Frankfurt. In 1956 Pollock published Automation: Materials for the Evaluation of the Economic and Social Consequences as interdisciplinary analyses. This publication exemplified holistic economic research, which had been championed by the Frankfurt school in the 1950s. In Automation Pollock argued that post-industrial employees might be spared from "soul-destroying drudgery".

In 1957, Pollock and Horkheimer moved to Montagnola in the Swiss canton of Ticino, although Pollock held the position of professor emeritus at the University of Frankfurt until 1963. He died in Montagnola in 1970.

== Work and reception ==
Pollock has been described as the Frankfurt School's specialist in the field of the critique of political economy. Through his theory of state capitalism, first proposed in his 1932 and 1933 articles, Pollock made a key contribution to the development of critical theory. He regarded the Soviet Union as paradigmatic of the state capitalist model, but extended it also to Nazi Germany (in particular, the Strength Through Joy organisation) and to Franklin D. Roosevelt's first hundred days in office. Arguing that Nazi Germany was like the Soviet Union a command economy based on technological rationality, he advanced the view that state capitalism had emerged as a stable, efficient, politically neutral solution to the crises of monopoly capitalism. In the wartime debates on understanding fascism at the Institute for Social Research, his position was broadly supported by Horkheimer and Adorno, while members of the outer circle of the Frankfurt School, including Franz Neumann, Otto Kirchheimer, Arcadius Gurland and Herbert Marcuse, contended that National Socialism was still a monopoly capitalist formation based on large private enterprise, despite its political roots in petit bourgeois resentment against the power of big business. Franz Neumann's 1942 book Behemoth: The Structure and Practice of National Socialism was written in part as a refutation of Pollock's notion of state capitalism and his emphasis on political determination. Pollock's subordination of economic to political concepts, along with his prioritisation of the contradiction between the forces and the relations of production in understanding capitalism, later became a target for Moishe Postone's critique of "traditional Marxism".

== Selected works ==
- Sombarts “Widerlegung” des Marxismus (Werner Sombart's "Refutation" of Marxism), Leipzig: Carl Grünberg, 1926.
- "Zur Marxschen Geldtheorie", Archiv für die Geschichte des Sozialismus und der Arbeiterbewegung 13 (1928), pp. 193–209.
- Die planwirtschaftlichen Versuche in der Sowjetunion, 1917–1927 (Attempts at Planned Economy in the Soviet Union, 1917–1927), Leipzig: C.L. Hirschfeld, 1929, OCLC 1281514; reprinted Frankfurt: Neue Kritik, 1971.
- "State Capitalism: Its Possibilities and Limitations", Zeitschrift für Sozialforschung 9.2 (1941), pp. 200–225; reprinted in The Essential Frankfurt School Reader, ed. Andrew Arato and Eike Gebhardt, New York: Urizen Books, 1978, pp. 71–94, ISBN 0-8264-0194-5.
- "Is National Socialism a New Order?", Zeitschrift für Sozialforschung 9.3 (1941), pp. 440–455.
- Gruppenexperiment. Ein Studienbericht, Frankfurt a.M.: Europäische Verlagsanstalt, 1955, OCLC 6995146.
  - partial English trans. by Andrew J. Perrin and Jeffrey K. Olick in Group Experiment and Other Writings: The Frankfurt School on Public Opinion in Postwar Germany, Cambridge, MA: Harvard University Press, 2011, ISBN 9780674048461.
- Automation. Materialien zur Beurteilung der ökonomischen und sozialen Folgen, Frankfurt a.M.: Europäische Verlagsanstalt, 1956; 2nd edn., with Emil J. Walter und Pierre Rolle, 1964.
  - English trans. by W. O. Henderson and W. H. Chaloner: The Economic and Social Consequences of Automation, Oxford: Blackwell, 1957, OCLC 901285181.
  - Spanish trans. La automación. Sus consecuencias económicas y sociales, Buenos Aires: Editorial Sudamericana, 1959.
- Sozialökonomische Auswirkungen der Automation und der Atomtechnik, Berlin: Rundfunk im amerikanischen Sektor, 1956.
- Aufsätze zum Staatskapitalismus, Rotdruck, 1973.
- Bemerkungen zur Wirtschaftskrise (as Kurt Baumann), Rotdruck, 1973.
- Stadien des Kapitalismus, ed. Helmut Dubiel, München: C. H. Beck, 1975, ISBN 9783406049255, OCLC 1530105.
- Schriften zu Nationalsozialismus und Antisemitismus, ed. Philipp Lenhard, Wien: Ça Ira, 2026, ISBN 9783862591343.

== Bibliography ==
- Abromeit, John (2018), "Max Horkheimer and the Early Model of Critical Theory", in Beverley Best; Werner Bonefeld; Chris O'Kane (eds.), The SAGE Handbook of Frankfurt School Critical Theory, vol. 1, Thousand Oaks, CA: SAGE, pp. 19–38, doi:10.4135/9781526436122.n2, ISBN 978-1-4739-5334-5
- Best, Beverley; Bonefeld, Werner; O'Kane, Chris (2018), "Introduction: Key Texts and Contributions to a Critical Theory of Society", in Beverley Best; Werner Bonefeld; Chris O'Kane (eds.), The SAGE Handbook of Frankfurt School Critical Theory, vol. 1, Thousand Oaks, CA: SAGE, pp. 1–16, doi:10.4135/9781526436122.n1, ISBN 978-1-4739-5334-5
- Buchstein, Hubertus (2018), "Arkadij Gurland: Political Science as Critical Theory", in Beverley Best; Werner Bonefeld; Chris O'Kane (eds.), The SAGE Handbook of Frankfurt School Critical Theory, vol. 1, Thousand Oaks, CA: SAGE, pp. 268–283, doi:10.4135/9781526436122.n16, ISBN 978-1-4739-5334-5
- Campani, Carlo (1992), Pianificazione e teoria critica. L'opera di Friedrich Pollock dal 1923 al 1943, Napoli: Liguori, ISBN 9788820720506
- Emery, Nicola (2023), For nonconformism: Max Horkheimer and Friedrich Pollock: the other Frankfurt school, Boston: Brill
- Lange, Elena Louisa (2018), "Moishe Postone: Marx's Critique of Political Economy as Immanent Social Critique", in Beverley Best; Werner Bonefeld; Chris O'Kane (eds.), The SAGE Handbook of Frankfurt School Critical Theory, vol. 1, Thousand Oaks, CA: SAGE, pp. 514–532, doi:10.4135/9781526436122.n31, ISBN 978-1-4739-5334-5
- Lenhard, Philipp (2024), Friedrich Pollock: The Éminence Grise of the Frankfurt School, Leiden: Brill, ISBN 978-90-04-50748-7
- Olson, Karsten (2018), "Franz L. Neumann's Behemoth: A Materialist Voice in the Gesamtgestalt of Fascist Studies", in Beverley Best; Werner Bonefeld; Chris O'Kane (eds.), The SAGE Handbook of Frankfurt School Critical Theory, vol. 1, Thousand Oaks, CA: SAGE, pp. 89–104, doi:10.4135/9781526436122.n6, ISBN 978-1-4739-5334-5
- Schale, Frank; Klingsporn, Lisa; Buchstein, Hubertus (2018), "Otto Kirchheimer: Capitalist State, Political Parties and Political Justice", in Beverley Best; Werner Bonefeld; Chris O'Kane (eds.), The SAGE Handbook of Frankfurt School Critical Theory, vol. 1, Thousand Oaks, CA: SAGE, pp. 105–122, doi:10.4135/9781526436122.n7, ISBN 978-1-4739-5334-5
