= Hedda Korsch =

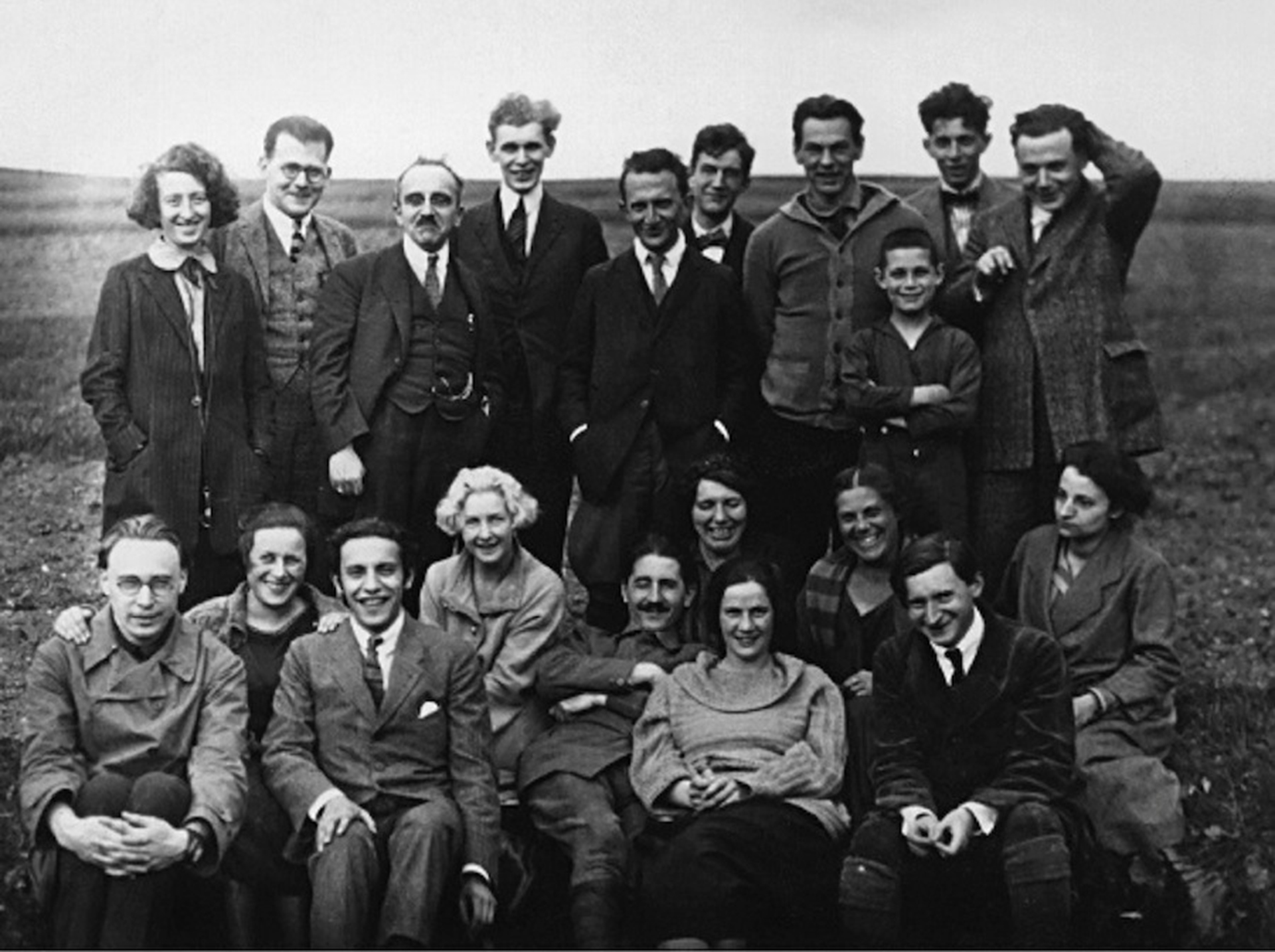
Hedda at the Marxist Working Week Geraberg 1923. Group photo, standing from left to right: Hede Massing, Friedrich Pollock, Eduard Ludwig Alexander, Konstantin Zetkin, Georg Lukács, Julian Gumperz, Richard Sorge, Karl Alexander (child), Felix Weil, unknown; sitting: Karl August Wittfogel, Rose Wittfogel, unknown, Christiane Sorge, Karl Korsch, Hedda Korsch, Käthe Weil, Margarete Lissauer, Bela Fogarasi, Gertrud Alexander

Hedda Korsch (née Hedwig Franceska Luisa Gagliardi; August 20, 1890 – July 11, 1982) was a German educationalist and university professor who emigrated to the United States.

Hedda was born into a bourgeois Catholic family who provided her with an intellectual and artistic background. Her maternal grandmother was Hedwig Dohm, a feminist.

She was a founding member of the Communist Party of Germany (KPD). In the 1920s she taught at the University of Jena. She was involved in experimental schools. She also worked for the Soviet Trade Mission in Berlin. However, she was sacked by KPD leaders on account of her relationship with husband Karl Korsch.

The couple fled Germany in 1933, at first to Denmark and England, and then in 1936 to the United States where they would spend the rest of their lives. Hedda taught at Wheaton College, Norton, Massachusetts.

== See also ==
- Wickersdorf Free School Community, where Korsch taught
