= Hermann Weil =

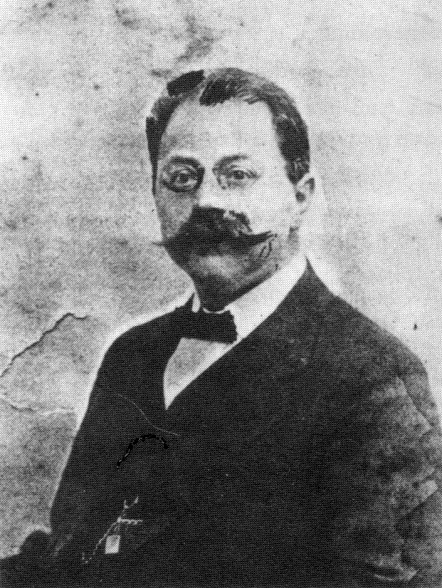
- Hermann Weil (c. 1910)
- Born: 18 September 1868; Steinsfurt, Grand Duchy of Baden
- Died: 3 October 1927 (aged 59); Frankfurt, Germany
- Known for: Grain trader Frankfurt University Institute for Social Research
- Spouse: Rosa Weil
- Children: Felix Weil

Hermann Weil (German: [vaɪl]; 18 September 1868 – 3 October 1927) was a German-Argentine businessman, who in the beginning of the 20th century was the biggest grain trader in the world. He was a patron of his hometown Steinsfurt in addition to the University of Frankfurt. He funded the Frankfurt University Institute for Social Research, which developed the Frankfurt School of Marxist thought and critical theory. He was the father of Felix Weil.

== Early life ==
He was the tenth of 13 children born in a Jewish family to his father Josef Weil (1823-1887) and mother Fanny. His family owned a livestock shop in Steinsfurt. After graduating from a Realschule in Sinsheim in 1883, Weil moved to Mannheim, the then center for European grain trade. He began an apprenticeship with grain trader Isidor Weismann. He quickly rose in rank, and began conducting business for Weismann in Switzerland, Antwerp, and the Balkans.

== Career ==
His two older brothers, Leopold and Gustav, emigrated to the United States. Weil followed them in 1888 with two other brothers, Samuel and Ferdinand. Weil and his brothers Samuel and Ferdinand soon found their way to Buenos Aires, Argentina, and moved there. Weil continued to work for Weismann, and in 1895 he founded a subsidiary in Buenos Aires. In 1896 he married Rosa Weismann, a daughter of Weismann. They had two children, Felix José Weil (1898-1975) and Anita Alice (1901-1951).

In 1898, Weil and his brothers founded Weil Hermanos & Cia. His company expanded quickly, with help of the emerging Argentine grain market and his contacts from Mannheim. Two years later in 1900, the company had 3,000 employees, subsidiaries in every major European city, and a fleet of 60 ships.

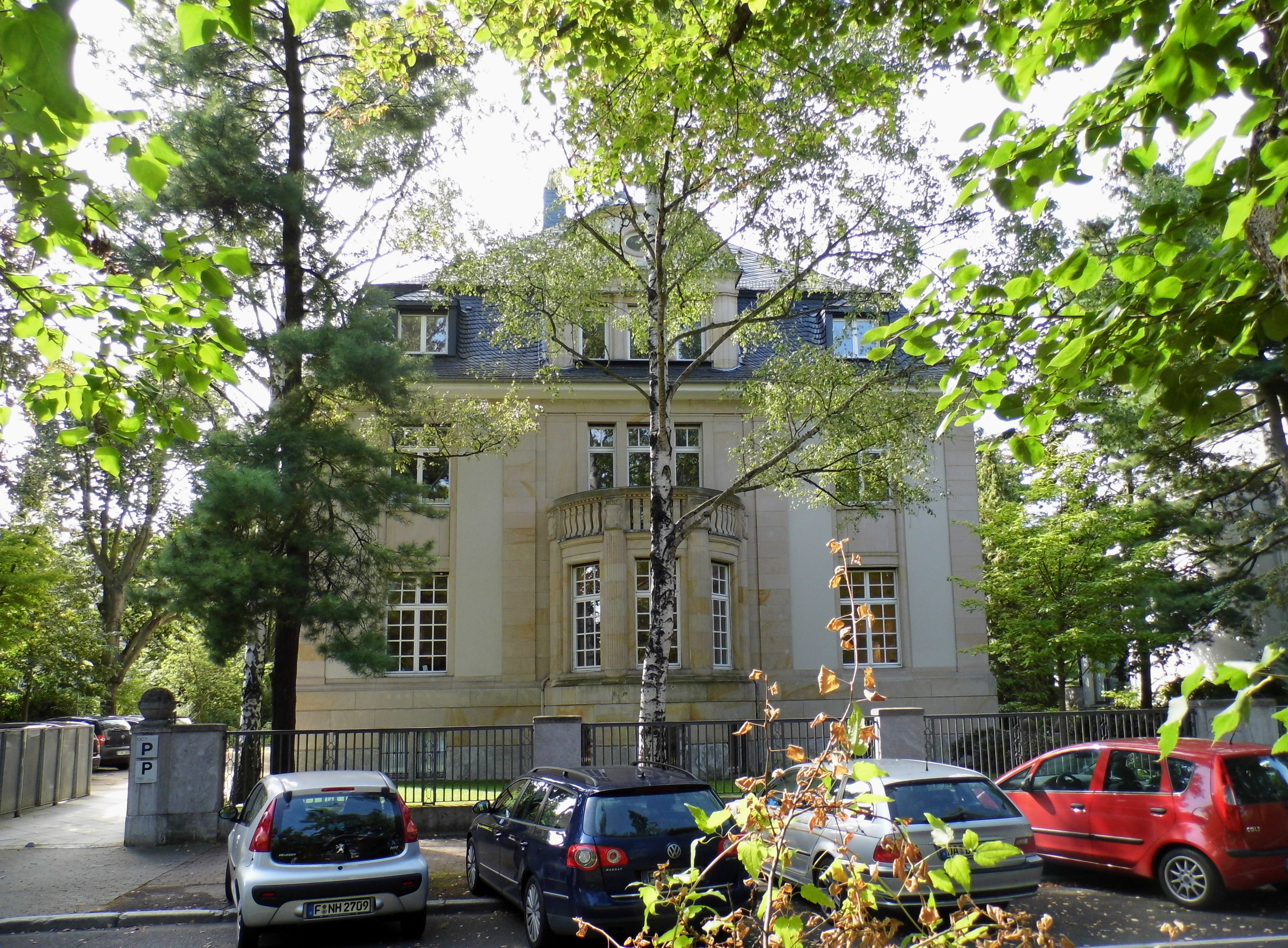
Weil's Frankfurt villa.

In 1907, Weil returned to Germany for health reasons. His brother Samuel continued to operate the business in Buenos Aires, while Weil lead his business from Rotterdam. He and his wife moved to Frankfurt am Main, and had a villa erected in Zeppelinallee 77.

On the 16th of April 1912, his wife Rosa died due to cancer.

Weil became less involved in his business and more in politics. In 1915, he offered his villa up to be a clinic, and started to advise on the German economy. He even became an advisor to Kaiser Wilhelm II. Weil and the Kaiser spoke about the potential benefits of a U-Boat blockade of England. However, his visions did not turn out to reflect reality.

After the First World War, he focused again on his business, and expanding it into the meat trade. Fortunately, his business remained successful in Argentina.

Weil was disgruntled by the political situation in Germany after the war, and expressed his disgust over the increasing Antisemitism present and the murders of Rathenau and Erzberger in a letter to the Lord Mayor of Frankfurt in February 1923. He also expressed his belief that the German people were being robbed and exploited. This led him to contribute more to humanitarian causes. In total he spent 120 million Marks constructing and maintaining social relief organizations, which helped veterans, orphans, etc. Being a long-term donor to the University of Frankfurt, he founded the Institute for Social Research.

Weil and his brothers Samuel and Ferdinand, made a fund, whilst in Argentina, to care for their relatives in Germany. After the war, this fund benefitted the veterans.

Weil wanted to be buried in the Jewish cemetery in Steinsfurt. But due to Jewish burial rules, his wife could not be buried there, as she was cremated. Instead, Weil built a mausoleum outside of the cemetery. In November 1938, the mausoleum was vandalized in the Kristallnacht. The urns remain lost. In 1980, the city of Waibstadt, had the mausoleum restored. The mausoleum is now a monument for Antisemitism.

== Honors ==
In Waibstadt, a street was named after him. He received an honorary doctorate from the University of Frankfurt.
