= Entschiedene Linke =

The Entschiedene Linke (Determined Left) was communist political current formed by Karl Korsch and Ernst Schwarz in 1926. It initially attracted 7,000 members.

Their political positions were in all important issues identical to those of the Communist Workers' Party of Germany and during their congress of 4–6 June 1927 they decided unanimously to join them.
