= Gerhard Stapelfeldt =

German sociologist (born 1947)

- Born: October 26, 1947 (age 78)

Academic work
- Discipline: Sociology

Gerhard Stapelfeldt (born October 26, 1947, Hamburg, Germany) is a German sociologist. He was a university teacher at the University of Hamburg until December 2010.

In 1979 Stapelfeldt published his PhD Thesis, a reconstruction and interpretation of Karl Marx's Das Kapital with special reference to Marx's further studies and writings. Following this interpretation he then put its consequences into practice by developing a programme of depicting and interpreting political economy, from mercantilism, to Liberalism, imperialism and finally Neoliberalism.

The focus of his studies lies in the critical theory of society and the history of ideas with theorists Max Horkheimer, Theodor W. Adorno, and Herbert Marcuse as reference points. Other major influences on his thinking come from Greek philosophy, Georg Friedrich Wilhelm Hegel, and Sigmund Freud. He teaches sociology but also social history, economic history and philosophy.

His major achievement is a three-part work, also his habilitation, entitled Critique of Economic Rationality (Kritik der ökonomischen Rationalität). In it Stapelfeldt describes the genesis, as well as the logic and institutional and empirical structure of capitalism in the eras of state-interventionism and Neoliberalism. The books contain a general historicophilosophical part as well as examinations of the political economy of the Federal Republic of Germany, the European Union and world economy.

Among Stapelfeldt's current works is an analysis of the Euro area crisis (http://www.kritiknetz.de). In explaining the history of the Euro critically the author demonstrates that European policy wielded the currency mostly, not political ideas, as EU-European identity.

== Works ==
- Das Problem des Anfangs in der Kritik der politischen Ökonomie, Campus, Frankfurt am Main / New York 1979
- Peru - im Namen der Freiheit ins Elend, Fischer, Frankfurt am Main 1984
- Verelendung und Urbanisierung in der Dritten Welt, Breitenbach, Saarbrücken 1990
- Kritik der ökonomischen Rationalität, Erster Band: Geschichte der ökonomischen Rationalisierung, Lit, Münster 1998, ²2004
- Kritik der ökonomischen Rationalität, Zweiter Band: Wirtschaft und Gesellschaft der Bundesrepublik Deutschland, Lit, Münster 1998, ISBN 3-8258-3627-4
- Kritik der ökonomischen Rationalität, Dritter Band: Europäische Union: Integration und Desintegration, Lit, Münster 1998
- Der Merkantilismus. Die Genese der Weltgesellschaft vom 16. bis zum 18. Jahrhundert, Ça Ira: Freiburg 2001, ISBN 3-924627-73-8
- Geist und Geld, Lit, Münster 2003
- Theorie der Gesellschaft und empirische Sozialforschung. Zur Logik der Aufklärung des Unbewussten, Ça Ira, Freiburg 2004
- Zur deutschen Ideologie, Lit, Münster 2005
- Der Liberalismus. Die Gesellschaftstheorien von Smith, Ricardo, Marx, Ça Ira, Freiburg 2006, ISBN 3-924627-78-9
- Der Aufbruch des konformistischen Geistes. Thesen zur Kritik der neoliberalen Universität, Kovac, Hamburg 2007, ISBN 978-3-8300-2898-7
- Mythos und Logos. Antike Philosophie von Homer bis Sokrates, Verlag Dr. Kovac, Hamburg 2007, ISBN 978-3-8300-3250-2
- Der Imperialismus – Krise und Krieg 1870/73 bis 1918/29, Erster Band: Politische Ökonomie, Verlag Dr. Kovac, Hamburg 2008, ISBN 978-3-8300-3654-8
- Der Imperialismus – Krise und Krieg 1870/73 bis 1918/29, Zweiter Band: Anthropologie und Rationalität, Verlag Dr. Kovac, Hamburg 2008, ISBN 978-3-8300-3655-5
- Das Problem des Anfangs in der Kritik der Politischen Ökonomie von Karl Marx. Zum Verhältnis von Arbeitsbegriff und Dialektik, 2. erw. Auflage (hgg. von Bastian Bredtmann und Hanno Plass), Verlag Dr. Kovac, Hamburg 2009, ISBN 978-3-8300-3963-1
- Kapitalistische Weltökonomie. Vom Staatsinterventionismus zum Neoliberalismus. Kritik der ökonomischen Rationalität. Vierter Band, erstes Buch. Verlag Dr. Kovac, Hamburg 2009, ISBN 978-3-8300-4444-4.
- Kapitalistische Weltökonomie. Vom Staatsinterventionismus zum Neoliberalismus. Kritik der ökonomischen Rationalität. Vierter Band, zweites Buch. Verlag Dr. Kovac, Hamburg 2009, ISBN 978-3-8300-4774-2.
- Aufstieg und Fall des Individuums. Kritik der bürgerlichen Anthropologie. Ça ira, Freiburg i. Br. 2014, ISBN 978-3-8625-9117-6
- Warum Krieg? - Russlands Vernichtungskrieg gegen die Ukraine und das Ende der Globalisierung. Verlag Dr. Kovač, Hamburg 2024. ISBN 978-3-3391-4226-9
