= Karl Korsch =

German theoretician and political philosopher (1886–1961)

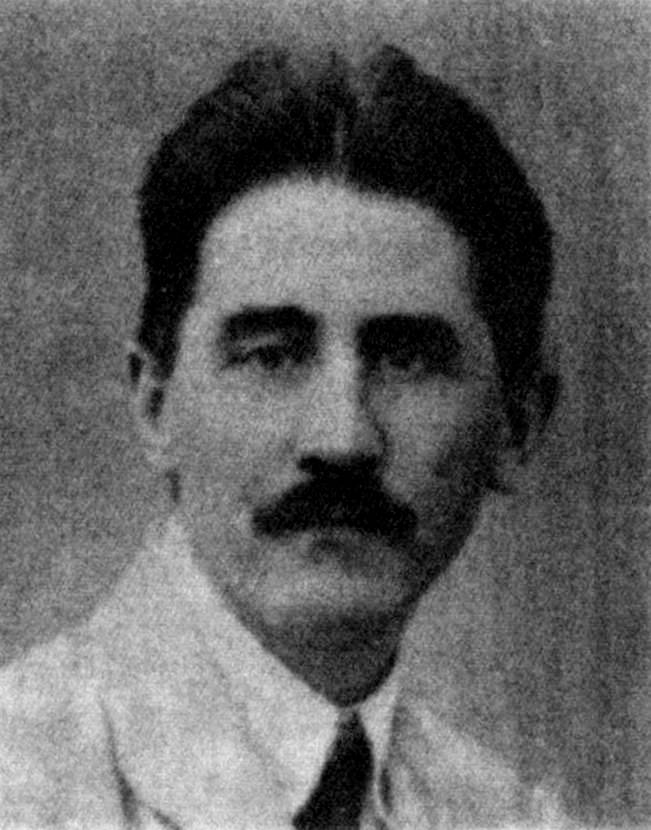
- Korsch's official Reichstag portrait, 1924
- Born: 15 August 1886; Tostedt, Province of Hanover, Prussia, German Empire
- Died: 21 October 1961 (aged 75); Belmont, Massachusetts, U.S.

Education
- Education: Ludwig-Maximilians-Universität München; University of Geneva; Friedrich Wilhelm University of Berlin; University of Jena (Dr. jur.)

Philosophical work
- Era: 20th-century philosophy
- Region: Western philosophy
- School: Western Marxism
- Institutions: Tulane University; Columbia University
- Notable students: Bertolt Brecht, Felix Weil
- Main interests: Politics, economics, law
- Notable ideas: The principle of historical specification (comprehending all things social in terms of a definite historical epoch)

Minister of Justice of the Free State of Thuringia
- In office 16 October 1923 – 12 November 1923
- Minister-President: August Frölich
- Preceded by: Roman Rittweger
- Succeeded by: Richard Leutheußer

Member of the Reichstag for Thuringia
- In office 26 July 1924 – 1 July 1928
- Preceded by: Hermann Schubert
- Succeeded by: Multi-member district

Member of the Landtag of Thuringia
- In office February 1924 – July 1924

Personal details
- Party: USPD (1917–1920); KPD (1920–1926); KAPD (1927)
- Other political affiliations: Determined Left (1926); Group of International Communists (1926); Left Communists (1926–1928)

Karl Korsch (German: [ˈkaʁl ˈkɔʁʃ]; August 15, 1886 – October 21, 1961) was a German Marxist theoretician and political philosopher. He is recognized as one of the "dissidents" that challenged the Marxism of the Second International of Karl Kautsky, Georgi Plekhanov and Lenin. Along with György Lukács, Korsch is considered to be one of the major figures responsible for laying the groundwork for Western Marxism in the 1920s.

== Early years ==
Karl Korsch was born in the small rural village of Tostedt (near Hamburg) to Lutheran parents, Carl August Korsch and his wife Therese (née Raikowski), on August 15, 1886. Although Karl's father worked as a secretary in a city hall bureau, he was deeply devoted to studying the philosophy of Leibniz in his private life. He wrote an unpublished book covering the development of Leibnitz's theories of the monads. Longing for a more urban and intellectual life, Carl August made the decision to relocate his family west, to a village just outside Meiningen in the Thuringen region, when Karl was eleven years old. The move not only allowed the elder Korsch to obtain employment at a local bank (where he eventually rose to the position of vice president), it also gave his children the opportunity to receive a better education. Karl, who showed great intellectual promise at a young age, excelled as a student during his years of schooling at Meiningen.

Beginning in 1906, Korsch successively attended the Ludwig-Maximilians-Universität München, the University of Geneva, and the Friedrich Wilhelm University of Berlin, studying various subjects such as philosophy and humanities in preparation for a more concentrated study in the field of law. Korsch then entered the University of Jena (incidentally, the same university that awarded Karl Marx his doctorate in philosophy in 1841) to begin working on his law degree in 1908. When he was not occupied with his studies, Korsch was extremely active in the Freie Studenten, a left-of-center student group which pushed for further liberalization of the school's code of behavior. Korsch also found time to become editor of the student newspaper, to which he also contributed articles. In addition, Korsch organized and participated in lectures that featured prominent socialist speakers such as Eduard Bernstein and Karl Liebknecht. The extent of his extracurricular activities did not seem to have the slightest detrimental effect on Korsch's academic performance since he managed to earn his doctor of law from the University of Jena's in 1910. His thesis title was Die Anwendung der Beweislastregeln im Zivilprozess und das qualifizierte Geständnis (The application of the burden of proof in civil cases and the qualified confession). It was around this time that Korsch met Hedda Gagliardi, whom he would eventually marry in 1913.

== First World War ==
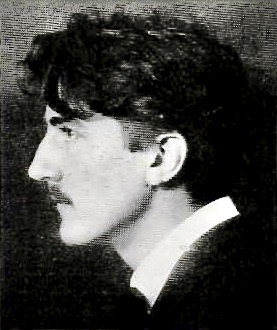
Korsch c. 1914

Korsch received a grant in 1912 to travel to England and work on translating and writing a commentary to a legal text by Sir Ernest Schuster. During this time, Korsch became a member of the Fabian Society, a reformist socialist organization. In 1913 he married Hedda Gagliardi, who came from a bourgeois family. She was a grandchild of feminist Hedwig Dohm, who would be closely involved in his theoretical work. Hedda Korsch from 1916 was a teacher at the Wickersdorf Free School Community. Korsch's stay in England came to an end in the summer of 1914 when he received orders to report to his military regiment at Meiningen for maneuvers. Despite being opposed to a war that he knew was on the horizon, Korsch nevertheless made the decision to return to his native country because in the words of his wife: “He wanted to be with the masses, and they would be in the army.” At the start of the war, Korsch initially held the rank of lieutenant but was quickly demoted to sergeant for daring to voice his objections to the German Army's invasion of neutral Belgium. However, these disciplinary measures did little to shake Korsch of his pacifist convictions; throughout the war, he refused to carry any sort of weapon into battle. According to Hedda Korsch, Karl's rationale for going into combat unarmed was “that it made no difference, since you were just as safe with or without a weapon: the point was that you were safe neither way.” Instead of fighting, Korsch made it his personal mission to save as many lives as he could. As the conflict wore on, Korsch was decorated several times and was even re-promoted to the rank of captain. He was awarded the Iron Cross twice for his bravery under fire. More important than these official accolades, Korsch's strong moral character and reputation for bravery under fire helped him garner the respect of many of the men in his company. An account cited that he had to change his North German accent to be understood by the soldiers and the common people.

In 1917, he joined the Independent Social Democratic Party of Germany (USPD), which had broken away from the Social Democratic Party of Germany over the latter's support for the war. When widespread unrest began to sweep through the German military in 1917, this company established a soldiers' soviet with Korsch being elected by his fellow soldiers to serve as one of this soviet's delegates. This "red company" was one of the last to be demobilized, a process which occurred in January 1919.

== Political activism in Germany, 1917–1933 ==
Korsch's wartime experiences in Germany had radicalised him, especially the ferment within the leftwing parties of Germany following the Russian Revolution. Korsch focused his studies and writings on working-out a replacement economic system for workers' councils to implement across Germany, published under the title What is Socialization? in March 1919. Korsch was part of the USPD faction which joined the Communist Party of Germany in 1920. This was despite his misgivings about the twenty-one Conditions required for adherence to the Comintern. After an SPD-KPD coalition government was formed in Free State of Thuringia in October 1923, Korsch was appointed Minister of Justice. He served in the Second Frölich Cabinet for 27 days during the German October until President Friedrich Ebert issued a Reichsexekution, sending the Reichswehr to forcibly dissolve the government. Because he had called for the formation of Proletarian Hundreds, Korsch was forced to temporarily go into hiding.

In February 1924, Korsch was elected to the Landtag of Thuringia, and in July he was elected to the Reichstag in a by-election triggered by the resignation of fellow Communist Hermann Schubert. He was re-elected in December 1924, serving until 1928.

On April 30, 1926, Korsch was expelled from the KPD. Earlier that year, he and Ernst Schwarz had formed the Entschiedene Linke (Determined Left), an opposition faction within the party that had initially attracted 7,000 members. Still retaining his Reichstag seat, he formed the Group of International Communists with two other expelled legislators before joining the Left Communists in November and the Communist Workers' Party of Germany in June 1927.

Korsch attributed the failure of the German revolution to the lack of ideological preparation and leadership of the working class. Accordingly, he turned his focus to developing workers' organisations into bodies subjectively capable of realizing revolutionary opportunities. In contrast to what seemed to him a materialist fatalism, he thought it would be possible to galvanize workers' organisations into bolder political action if more effort was put into educating workers in the deeper theory of Marxism.

== Exile ==
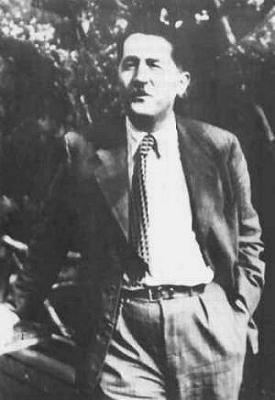
Korsch later in life

Having been active in left-wing politics in Germany from 1917 to 1933, he left his country of birth on 27 February 1933, the night of the Reichstag fire. At first he stayed in England and Denmark.

=== The deaths of Dora Fabian and Mathilde Wurm ===
The bodies of Dora Fabian and Mathilde Wurm were found in a locked bedroom in London on 4 April 1935. In the subsequent coroner's inquest, Korsch was to play a significant role. Fabian had been working with (Anton) Roy Ganz of the Swiss Police to investigate the activities of Hans Wesemann, a former Social Democrat journalist who had become a Nazi agent. In fact Korsch had attended an interview with Ganz at which Inspector Jempson of the Special Branch had been present, but without Korsch being aware of his identity. Korsch later claimed that Ganz had encouraged him to reveal his revolutionary sentiments in front of the policeman and suggested that this was a factor in the expulsion of Korsch from Britain a few months later.

=== Life in the United States ===
In 1936, he settled in the United States with his wife, teaching at Tulane University, New Orleans, and working at the Institute for Social Research, then part of Columbia University, New York City. Korsch died in Belmont, Massachusetts, on October 21, 1961.

In his later work, he rejected orthodox Marxism as historically outmoded, wanted to adapt Marxism to a new historical situation, and wrote in his Ten Theses (1950) that "the first step in re-establishing a revolutionary theory and practice consists in breaking with that Marxism which claims to monopolize revolutionary initiative as well as theoretical and practical direction" and that "today, all attempts to re-establish the Marxist doctrine as a whole in its original function as a theory of the working classes social revolution are reactionary utopias."

== Philosophical work ==
Korsch was especially concerned that Marxist theory was losing its precision and validity – in the words of the day, becoming "vulgarized" – within the upper echelons of the various socialist organizations. His masterwork, Marxism and Philosophy, is an attempt to re-establish the historic character of Marxism as the heir to Hegel. It commences with a quote from Vladimir Lenin's On the Significance of Militant Materialism: "We must organize a systematic study of the Hegelian dialectic from a materialist standpoint." Korsch's critique of the traditional bourgeois concept of progress in his work Karl Marx stressed that the development of material productive sources is not a natural result or a result of independent economic evolution and can be changed by man. He maintained that the revolutionary transformation of the mode of production and labor is essential to realize a proletarian revolution.

In Korsch's formulation, Hegel represented at the level of ideas the real, material progressiveness of the bourgeoisie. Alongside the extinction of 'Hegelianism' around 1848, the bourgeoisie lost its claim to that progressive role in society, ceasing to be the universal class. Marx, in taking Hegel and transforming that philosophy into something new, in which the workers would be the progressive class, himself represented the moment at which the revolutionary baton materially passed from bourgeoisie to workers. To Korsch, the central idea of Marxian theory was what he termed "the principle of historical specification". This means to "comprehend all things social in terms of a definite historical epoch". (Korsch, Karl Marx, p. 24) He emphasizes that Marx "deals with all categories of his economic and socio-historical research in that specific form and in that specific connection in which they appear in modern bourgeois society. He does not treat them as eternal categories." (op. cit., p. 29f.) He was also noted for claiming that socialism must not confine itself to the "socialization of the means of production" and, instead, construct useful formula for the socialistic organization of the national economy.

Korsch's stance had ramifications which were unpalatable to the official Communist Party structure – not least, casting the Party's own ideological weaknesses as the only material explanation for the failure of the revolution. Published in 1923, Marxism and Philosophy was strongly opposed by Party faithful and other left-wing figures, including Karl Kautsky and Grigory Zinoviev. Zinoviev famously said of Korsch and his fellow critic Lukács, "If we get a few more of these Professors spinning out their theories, we shall be lost." Over the subsequent five years, the German Communist Party gradually purged all such dissenting voices. Korsch survived within a current known as the Resolute Lefts, until his expulsion in April 1926. He remained a communist deputy to the Reichstag.

== Influence ==
Korsch is an oft-neglected figure within twentieth century political theory. While his critique was not accepted into the official Marxist–Leninist doctrine of the Third International, it remained influential amongst communist dissenters and academics for several decades. Within those currents, particularly in Germany, Britain, Hungary and Italy, his influence varies from group to group, but became more significant with the brief revival of revolutionary politics in the late 1960s and early 1970s. Korsch taught and befriended Bertolt Brecht, the Marxian playwright, who said he picked Korsch to instruct him in Marxism due to his independence from the Communist Party. It was through Brecht, moreover, that Korsch made the acquaintance of Walter Benjamin, who had also been active in the Freie Studenten and who had attended the Wickersdorf Free School Community, where Korsch's wife, Hedda Gagliardi, had been a teacher. Korsch's book, Karl Marx, which Benjamin read in manuscript form, is cited extensively in the convolute devoted to Marx in the Arcades Project. According to Howard Eiland and Michael W. Jennings, the text was “one of Benjamin’s main sources [on]… Marxism,” introduced him “to an advanced understanding of Marxism.

Korsch also instructed Felix Weil, the founder of the Institute for Social Research, from which the highly influential Frankfurt School was to emerge. He also influenced the German Marxist historian Arthur Rosenberg. Indirect disciples include Franz Jakubowski and Nildo Viana. Sidney Hook attended Korsch lectures in Berlin in 1928.

== Works ==
- 1923: 'Marxism and Philosophy'. English publication by NLB (New Left Books), 1970 (trans. Fred Halliday), reprinted by Verso, 2012, ISBN 978-1781680278.
- 1931: "The Crisis of Marxism." Unpublished essay; first published in 1971 in Die materialistische Geschichtsauffassung (in German).
- 1932: 'Geleitwort zu Kapital'. Berlin ('Introduction to Capital'); reprinted 1971 in Three Essays on Marxism.
- 1935: 'Why I am a Marxist'. In: Modern Quarterly, Vol. IX no. 2, April 1935, p. 88 - 95 (part of a symposium with other contributions Why I am Not a Marxist by Alexander Goldenweiser, George Santayana and H. G. Wells, and Why I am a Marxist by Harold Laski); reprinted 1971 in Three Essays on Marxism.
- 1937: 'Leading principles of Marxism: a Restatement'. In: Marxist Quarterly (published by the American Marxist Association), Vol 1/3, Oct-Dec 1937, p. 356 - 378; reprinted 1971 in Three Essays on Marxism.
- Karl Marx. London / New York: Chapman & Hall / John Wiley & Sons. 1938.
- 1938: Karl Marx, London: Chapman & Hall / New York: John Wiley & Sons. Originally published as part of a series "Modern Sociologists". Published in original German version 1967. Translated in Italian, French, Spanish and Greek. Many times reissued.
- 1971: Three essays on Marxism, introduction by Paul Breines, New York: Monthly Review Press (This contains the essays 'Why I am a Marxist', 'Introduction to Capital' and 'Leading Principles of Marxism: a Restatement'). Also published in London 1971 by Pluto Press.
- Revolutionary Theory, edited by Douglas Kellner, Austin: University of Texas Press, 1977 (A good collection, with a 60-page introductory essay on Korsch's life and work by Kellner).
- Ten Theses on Marxism Today, at Ten Theses on Marxism Today by Karl Korsch (1950). Published in Telos 26 (Winter 1975–76). New York: Telos Press.A Gesamtausgabe (Complete Works) in German is edited by Offizin Verlag, Hanover, Germany.

== Sources ==
- Bottomore, Tom; Harris, Laurence; Kiernan, V.G.; Miliband, Ralph, eds. (1983). The Dictionary of Marxist Thought. Blackwell Publishers Ltd. ISBN 0-674-20525-1. herein:
  - Goode, Patrick (1983). "Karl Korsch". In Bottomore, Tom; Harris, Laurence; Kiernan, V.G.; Miliband, Ralph (eds.). The Dictionary of Marxist Thought. Blackwell Publishers Ltd. pp. 263–264.
  - Jacoby, Russell (1983). "Western Marxism". In Bottomore, Tom; Harris, Laurence; Kiernan, V.G.; Miliband, Ralph (eds.). The Dictionary of Marxist Thought. pp. 523–526.
- Korsch, Karl (1977). Kellner, Douglas (ed.). Karl Korsch: Revolutionary Theory (PDF). Austin, TX: University of Texas Press. ISBN 9780292757400. OCLC 219839492. herein:
  - Kellner, Douglas (1977). "Korsch's Revolutionary Marxism". In Kellner, Douglas (ed.). Karl Korsch: Revolutionary Theory. Austin, TX: University of Texas Press. pp. 3–113.
- Mulhern, Francis, ed. (2011). "interview with Hedda Korsch: Memories of Karl Korsch (1972)". Lives on the Left: A Group Portrait. London / New York: verso. pp. 14–26. ISBN 978-1-84467-699-6. OCLC 859846151.
- Renton, David (2004). "Chapter 3:Karl Korsch, Marxism and philosophy". Dissident Marxism: Past Voices for Present Times. London etc.: Zed Books Ltd. pp. 60–81. ISBN 1-84277-292-9.
