= Steinsfurt =

- Village of Sinsheim
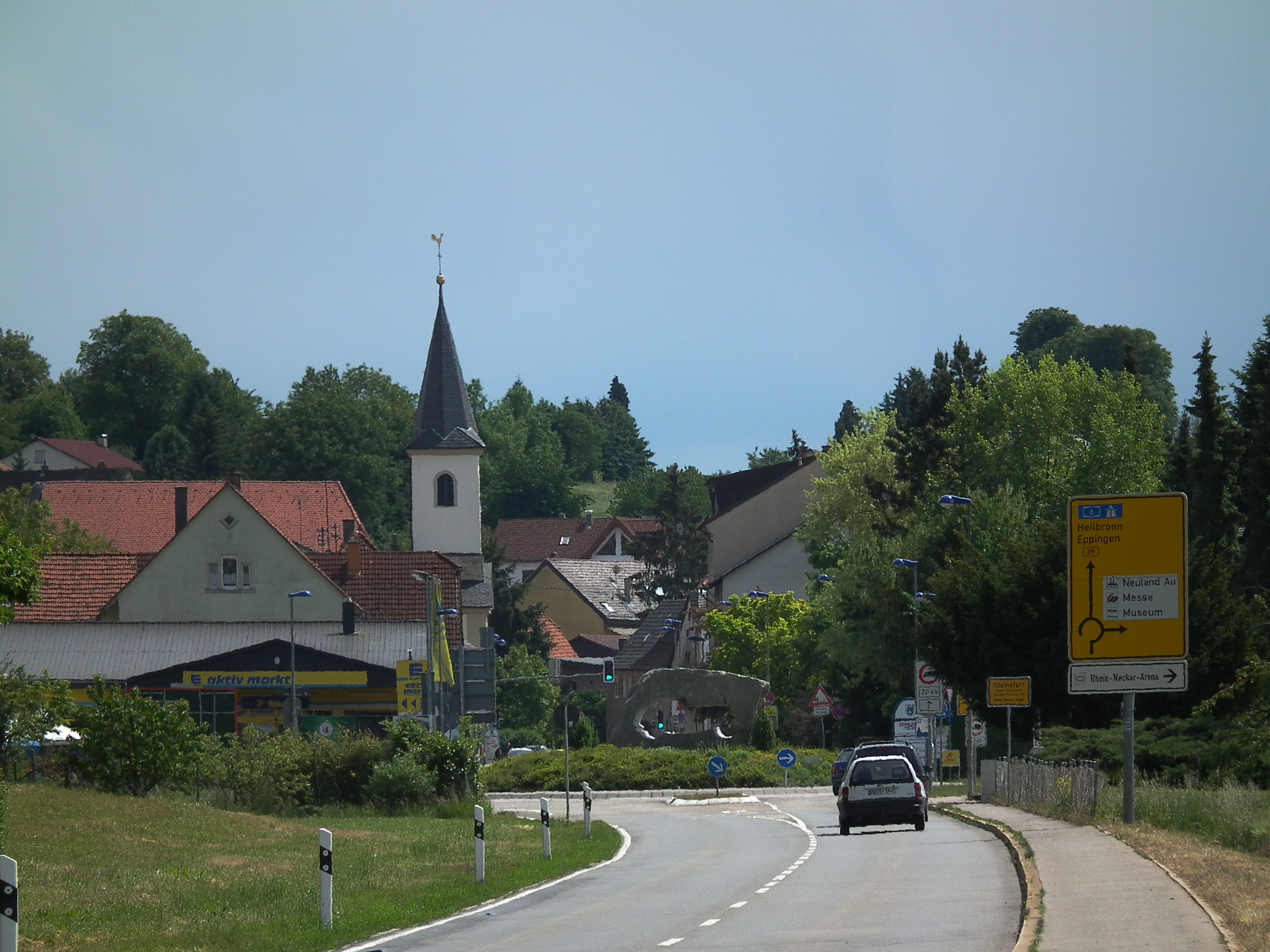
- Village's entrance

- Coat of arms
- Interactive map of Steinsfurt
- Location within Germany Location within Baden-Württemberg
- Coordinates: 49°15′N 08°53′E
- Country: Germany
- State: Baden-Württemberg
- Admin. region: Karlsruhe
- District: Rhein-Neckar-Kreis
- Town: Sinsheim

Area
  - Total: 127.01 km^{2} (49.04 sq mi)
- Elevation: 154 m (505 ft)

Population (2017-12-31)
  - Total: 3,269
  - Density: 25.74/km^{2} (66.66/sq mi)
- Time zone: UTC+01:00 (CET)
  - Summer (DST): UTC+02:00 (CEST)
- Postal codes: 74889
- Dialling codes: 07260, 07261
- Vehicle registration: HD, formerly SNH
- Website: www.steinsfurt.de

Steinsfurt is a village in southwestern Germany, in the Rhine Neckar Area of the Bundesland Baden-Württemberg between Heidelberg and Heilbronn in the district Rhein-Neckar. It is one of the 13 Stadtteile of Sinsheim, of which it is part since 1973. It has a total population of 3,269 (as of December 2017).

== Tourist attractions ==
Steinsfurts's main tourist attraction is the Sinsheim Auto & Technik Museum, featuring many of historic vehicles. It attracts over 1 million visitors per year. In 1989, a trade fair area was established that features all kinds of industrial and popular events.

The town also has a restored nineteenth-century synagogue.

== Stadium ==
On September 19, 2006, the mayor of Sinsheim announced that the Rhein-Neckar-Arena would be built in the suburb of Steinsfurt, not far from the Sinsheim Auto & Technik Museum, for other suburb, Hoffenheim's football club 1899 Hoffenheim. The €40 million stadium, built by Dietmar Hopp, a cofounder and major share holder of software giant SAP and chief investor in 1899 Hoffenheim, built the stadium which seats 30,000.

== See also ==
- Hoffenheim
