= Francis Mulhern =

Northern Irish newspaper editor

Francis Mulhern is Associate Editor of New Left Review and a long-standing member of the Editorial Committee of the journal (1975–86, 2003- ). Born in 1952, he grew up in Enniskillen, Northern Ireland, and was educated at University College Dublin and the University of Cambridge. He has taught at universities in Ireland, Italy, Brazil and the United States. He was for many years Professor of Critical Studies at Middlesex University, where he taught English Literature and intellectual history.

His books include:

- Into the Melee: Culture, Politics, Intellectuals (Verso, 2024)
- What Is Cultural Criticism? In debate with Stefan Collini (Verso, 2024)
- Figures of Catastrophe: The Condition of Culture Novel (Verso, 2016)
- Culture/Metaculture (Routledge, 2000)
- The Present Lasts a Long Time: Essays in cultural politics (Cork University Press, 1998)
- The Moment of 'Scrutiny' (NLB>Verso, 1979)

Edited works include:

- Roberto Schwarz, Two Girls and Other Essays (Verso, 2012)
- Lives on the Left: Interviews with New Left Review (Verso, 2011)
- Contemporary Marxist Literary Criticism (Longman, 1992)
- Raymond Williams, What I Came to Say (with Jenny Bourne Taylor and Neil Belton, Hutchinson Radius, 1989)

Articles in New Left Review include

- "Beyond Metaculture". New Left Review (16). 2002.
