= Jeffrey K. Olick =

American sociologist

Jeffrey K. Olick (born November 15, 1964) is an American sociologist. Currently, he is William R. Kenan Jr. Professor of Sociology and History at the University of Virginia. He is also co-president of the Memory Studies Association. Olick is a major figure in cultural sociology and social theory and has made significant contributions to the interdisciplinary field of memory studies.

Olick received his B.A. in Sociology and Anthropology from Swarthmore College in 1986 and his Ph.D. in sociology from Yale University in 1993.

== Academic Focus ==
=== Collective Memory ===
Olick's work has played a major role in reviving the concept of "collective memory." As Olick and his colleagues have documented, the concept has a long history, but is most commonly traced back to Maurice Halbwachs, a student of Émile Durkheim. Olick's early work sought to transcend debates between instrumentalist and functionalist approaches to memory, positing instead that collective memory is an ongoing process of meaning-making through time.

His empirical work focuses on Holocaust memory in postwar Germany, tracing the ways in which state leaders grapple with the difficult legacy of the Nazi past. He not only traces representations of the Holocaust in state rhetoric, but also builds on Mikhail Bakhtin to develop a dialogical approach to memory by examining the ways in which later moments in the discourse respond to earlier moments. In other words, commemorations are not merely discrete events, but instead attempts to come to terms with the past that are "structured in dialogue with each other and with the past," in which speakers draw upon the limited set of symbolic and rhetorical "resources...at their disposal." As Olick puts it: "Combining insights from the linguistic philosopher J. L. Austin and from Karl Marx, I was motivated by the analytical principle that people do things with words, but not in circumstances of their own choosing."

At a theoretical level, one of Olick's key contributions within memory studies is the distinction between "collective" and "collected" memory. While studies of "collected" memory examine "the aggregated individual memories of members of a group," studies of "collective" memory turn to "collective phenomena sui generis"—representations of the past that exist outside the confines of individual minds (e.g., memorials, speeches).

Historically, Olick identifies a shift in the underlying principles of political legitimation on the global stage. While state rhetoric once overwhelmingly focused on heroic commemorations of glorious pasts, states now increasingly must confront their own atrocities and misdeeds in order to establish or maintain legitimacy. Olick refers to this transformation as the rise of the "politics of regret."

=== Cultural Sociology and Sociological Theory ===
Olick is also a key figure in contemporary cultural sociology and sociological theory. His work on collective memory has been integral in the turn toward structuralist, hermeneutic, and semiotic approaches within the sociological study of culture. Such perspectives reject the tendency to conceptualize culture in subjective terms, arguing instead that culture ought to be understood as inter-subjective or objective. Taking inspiration from these perspectives, but also moving beyond them, Olick draws on Mikhail Bakhtin, Norbert Elias, and Pierre Bourdieu to formulate a "process-relational" approach to culture. Collective representations, he suggests, must not be reified or hypostatized, but instead seen as processes structured through ongoing practices.

Olick's translations of Theodor W. Adorno’s Group Experiment and Guilt and Defense (with Andrew Perrin) have not only made this material available to English-speaking readers for the first time, but also complicated and challenged received narratives about Adorno’s relationship to empirical sociology. Thus, these works have significant implications for both intellectual history and sociological theory.

Translations of Olick's work have appeared in Chinese, Japanese, Korean, German, Italian, Spanish, Estonian, Hungarian, Polish, and Russian.

== Key Publications ==
=== Books ===
- States of Memory: Continuities, Conflicts, and Transformations in National Retrospection (ed.). (Durham, NC: Duke University Press, 2003).
- In the House of the Hangman: The Agonies of German Defeat, 1943–1949. (Chicago: University of Chicago Press, 2005).
- The Politics of Regret: On Collective Memory and Historical Responsibility. (New York: Routledge, 2007).
- The Collective Memory Reader (ed.). (New York: Oxford University Press, 2011), with Vered Vinitzky-Seroussi and Daniel Levy.
- The Sins of the Fathers: Germany, Memory, Method (Chicago: University of Chicago Press, 2016).

=== Translations ===
- Theodor W. Adorno, Guilt and Defense: On the Legacies of National Socialism in Postwar Germany. (Cambridge, MA: Harvard University Press, 2010). Edited, translated, and introduced by Jeffrey K. Olick and Andrew J. Perrin.
- Theodor W. Adorno and Friedrich Pollock, Group Experiment and Other Writings: The Frankfurt School on Public Opinion in Postwar Germany. (Cambridge, MA: Harvard University Press, 2011). Edited, translated, and introduced by Andrew J. Perrin and Jeffrey K. Olick.

=== Articles and Book Chapters ===
- "Collective Memory and Cultural Constraint: Holocaust Myth and Rationality in German Politics" (with Daniel Levy). 1997. American Sociological Review 62(6):921-926.
- "Social Memory Studies: From 'Collective Memory' to the Historical Sociology of Mnemonic Practices" (with Joyce Robbins). 1998. Annual Review of Sociology 24:105-140.
- "Collective Memory and Chronic Differentiation: Historicity and the Public Sphere." 1998. Working Papers in the Humanities, Humanities Research Group, University of Windsor, Ontario, Canada.
- "Memory and the Nation: Continuities, Conflicts, and Transformations." 1998. Social Science History 22(4):377-387.
- "What Does it Mean to Normalize the Past?: Official Memory in German Politics since 1989." 1998. Social Science History 22(4):547-571.
- "Genre Memories and Memory Genres: A Dialogical Analysis of May 8th, 1945 Commemorations in the Federal Republic of Germany." 1999. American Sociological Review 64(3):381-402.
- "Collective Memory: The Two Cultures." 1999. Sociological Theory 17(3):333-348.
- "The Politics of Regret: Analytical Frames" (with Brenda Coughlin). 2003. pp. 37–62 in The Politics of the Past: On Repairing Historical Injustices, edited by John Torpey. Lanham, MD: Rowman and Littlefield.
- "The Value of Regret: Lessons from and for Germany." 2003. Religion and Public Life 33:21-32.
- "Products, Processes, and Practices: A Non-Reificatory Approach to Collective Memory." 2006. Biblical Theology Bulletin 36(1):5-14.
- "From Theodicy to Ressentiment: Trauma and the Ages of Compensation" (with Chares Demetriou). 2006. In Memory, Trauma, and World Politics: Reflections on the Relationship between Past and Present, edited by Duncan Bell. New York: Palgrave.
- "Collective Memory and Nonpublic Opinion: An Historical Note on a Methodological Controversy about a Political Problem." 2007. Symbolic Interaction 30(1):41-55.
- "The Agonies of Defeat: Parsing the Legacies of Perpetration." 2007. In Memories, Identities and Diasporas: Confronting the Holocaust and Post-Holocaust Jewish Lives, edited by Judith M. Gerson and Diane L. Wolf. Durham, NC: Duke University Press.
- "The Sociology of Retrospection." 2007. In Cultural Memory Studies: An International and Interdisciplinary Handbook, edited by Ansgar Nünning and Astrid Erll. Berlin/New York: de Gruyter.
- "Usable Pasts and the Return of the Repressed." 2007. The Hedgehog Review 9(2):19-31.
- "Collective Memory: A Memoir and Prospect." 2008. Memory Studies 1(1):23-29.
- "The Ciphered Transits of Collective Memory: Neo-Freudian Impressions." 2008. Social Research 75(1):1-22.
- "Times for Forgiveness: An Historical Perspective." 2009. In Considering Forgiveness, edited by Aleksandra Wagner. Vera List Center for the Arts and Politics, New School University.
- "Between Chaos and Diversity: Is Social Memory Studies a Field?." 2009. International Journal of Politics, Culture, and Society 22(2):249-252.
- "What is 'the Relative Autonomy of Culture?'" 2010. In Sociology of Culture: A Handbook, edited by John R. Hall, Laura Grindstaff and Ming-Chen Lo. New York: Routledge.
- "In the Ashes of Disgrace: Germany after 1945." 2010. In Shadows of War: A Social History of Silence in the Twentieth Century, edited by Jay Winter, Efrat Ben Ze’ev, and Ruth Ginio. New York: Cambridge University Press.
- "Non-Public Opinion: Adorno and the Frankfurt School’s Group Experiment" (with Andrew J. Perrin). 2010. Hedgehog Review 12(3):79-81.
