= Werner Bonefeld =

Werner Bonefeld is a German political theorist who served as professor of politics at the University of York, where he is now emeritus professor in the Department of Politics and International Relations. He is also an adjunct professor at the Postgraduate School ZRC SAZU.

== Career and research ==
Bonefeld was born in Atteln. He studied at the University of Marburg, the Free University of Berlin, and the University of Edinburgh, where he completed his doctorate. Before joining the University of York, he taught at the Universities of Frankfurt and Edinburgh. At York, he worked in political theory and political economy, and later retired from his professorship (remaining affiliated as emeritus).

Bonefeld’s research is associated with critical theory and Marxist political economy, and has been linked to the development of the internationally recognized Open Marxism approach. His published work addresses themes including capitalist social relations, political economy, and ordoliberalism.

== Selected works ==
- Bonefeld, W. (2014), Critical Theory and the Critique of Political Economy, London: Bloomsbury
- Bonefeld, W. (2023), A Critical Theory of Economic Compulsion, London: Routledge
