= Felix Weil =

German-Argentine Marxist and patron

Félix Weil
- Born: Lucio Félix José Weil; February 8, 1898; Buenos Aires, Argentina
- Died: September 18, 1975 (aged 77); Dover, Delaware, U.S.
- Other name: Felix Weil
- Education: University of Frankfurt am Main
- Known for: University of Frankfurt Institute for Social Research

Lucio Félix José Weil (German: [vaɪl]; 8 February 1898 – 18 September 1975) was a German-Argentine Marxist and patron, who provided the funds to found the Institute for Social Research in Frankfurt am Main, Germany, the institute later originated the Frankfurt School.

== Biography ==
Weil was born in Buenos Aires, Argentina and was the son of the wealthy grain merchant Hermann Weil and his wife Rosa Weil, both of whom were of Jewish origin. At the age of 9 he was sent to attend school in Germany at the Goethe-Gymnasium, Frankfurt.

He attended the University of Tübingen and the University of Frankfurt am Main, where he graduated with a doctoral degree in political science. While at these universities he became increasingly interested in socialism and Marxism. His thesis topic was "Socialization: An Attempt at a Conceptual Foundation, with a Critique of the Plans for Socialization".

He did his doctorate in Frankfurt am Main on the concept of socialization. Like Theodor W. Adorno, he belonged "to the generation of intellectuals born around the turn of the century and from bourgeois, mostly Jewish families, who were attracted in the 1920s to a philosophical Marxism beyond the workers' parties". He met Karl Korsch and studied Marxist economic theory.

Felix Weil married Käthe Badiert and moved to Argentina, his country of birth, for a year. The two were married from 1921 to 1929.

In 1923 he financed the Erste Marxistische Arbeitswoche ("First Marxist Workweek"), a conference in the German town of Ilmenau. The event was attended by various leftist figures such as Georg Lukács, Karl Korsch, Richard Sorge, Friedrich Pollock, and Karl August Wittfogel. The success of this event led him and his friend Friedrich Pollock to, with the help of an endowment from his father, found the Institute for Social Research in 1923.

== Works ==
- Argentine Riddle (1944)

== See also ==
- Critical theory (Frankfurt School)

== Sources ==
- Jay, Martin (1973). The Dialectical Imagination: A History of the Frankfurt School and the Institute of Social Research, 1923-1950. Boston and Toronto: Little, Brown & Company.
- Wiggershaus, Rolf (1995). The Frankfurt School: Its History, Theories and Political Significance. Cambridge, Mass.: The MIT Press.
- Helmuth Robert Eisenbach: Millionär, Agitator und Doktorand. Die Tübinger Studienzeit des Felix Weil (1919). In: Bausteine zur Tübinger Universitätsgeschichte, Band 3, Tübingen 1987, S. 179–216.
