= University of Frankfurt Institute for Social Research =

Research institute in Frankfurt, Germany

Institut für Sozialforschung
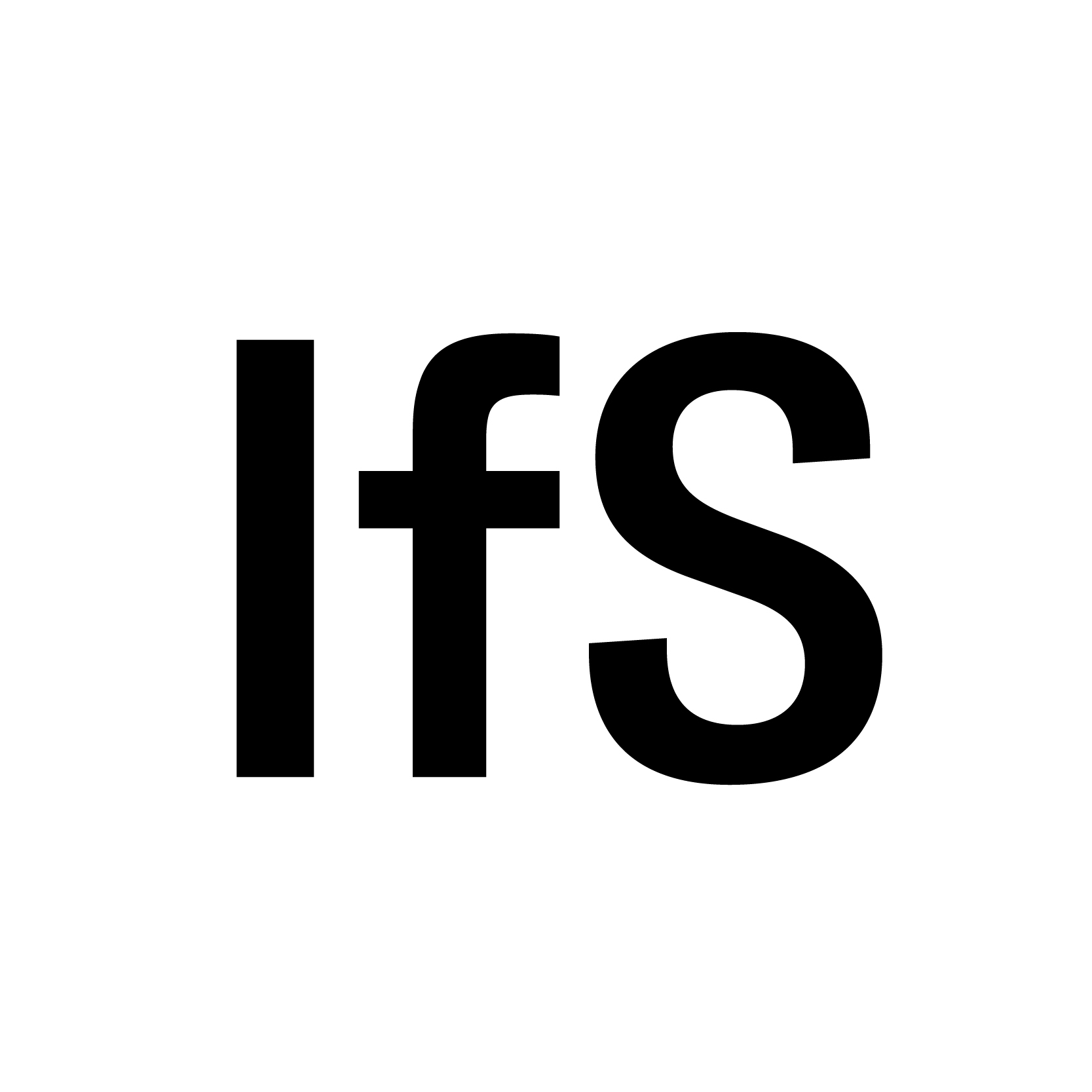
- Abbreviation: IfS
- Formation: 1923; 103 years ago
- Founder: Felix Weil
- Headquarters: Frankfurt am Main
- Coordinates: 50°07′06″N 8°39′14″E
- Director: Stephan Lessenich
- Affiliations: Goethe University Frankfurt; Columbia University; The New School
- Website: www.ifs.uni-frankfurt.de

The University of Frankfurt Institute for Social Research (German: Institut für Sozialforschung, IfS) is a sociology and continental philosophy research institute best known as the home of the Frankfurt School and critical theory. Formerly affiliated with Columbia University in New York City, it has returned to Goethe University Frankfurt.

== History ==
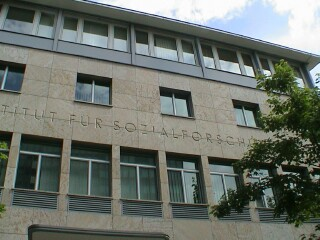
The current building of the Institute for Social Research, at Senckenberganlage 26 in Frankfurt

As its prospective director, academic Kurt Albert Gerlach planned the institute with patron Felix Weil, Marxist philosopher Karl Korsch's pupil. Gerlach died in 1922. Weil founded it in 1923 with an endowment from his father, businessman Hermann Weil, and affiliated it with the University of Frankfurt am Main. Historian Carl Grünberg became its first director and gathered fellow Marxists at the institute, including economist Henryk Grossman. In 1928, co-founder Friedrich Pollock became acting director.

Philosopher Max Horkheimer became director in 1930, and the thinkers known as the Frankfurt School formed around him. He edited the institute's journal, the Zeitschrift für Sozialforschung (Journal for Social Research), and wrote essays defining a critical theory of society. That year, as Nazi influence grew, the founders prepared to move the institute to Geneva, Switzerland, and gradually completed the move in 1933.

In 1934, the institute moved to New York City, affiliated with Columbia University, and renamed its journal the Studies in Philosophy and Social Science, helping establish Frankfurt School thinkers in Anglophone academia. In 1940, Horkheimer moved to Los Angeles to join fellow German exiles, including Bertolt Brecht and Thomas Mann, and began writing Dialectic of Enlightenment with his friend Theodor W. Adorno. Pollock resumed as acting director in 1941.

Horkheimer, Pollock, and Adorno began returning the institute to Frankfurt in 1950. Horkheimer oversaw its reopening and re-affiliation in 1951 and resumed directorship, succeeded by Adorno in 1958. After Adorno died in 1969, his assistant, the philosopher Jürgen Habermas, declined the post, as did sociologist Thomas Bottomore. Habermas proposed philosopher Leszek Kołakowski, but the philosophy department opposed his candidacy. In 1971, sociologist Gerhard Brandt became director, restoring direction with a focus on labor sociology. He stepped down in 1974 and was succeeded by sociologist Ludwig von Friedeburg, a former education minister whose directorship focused on education sociology until the end of his tenure in 2001.

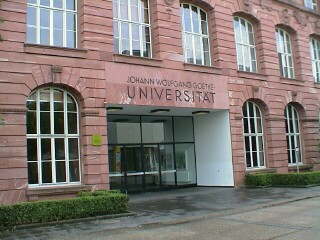
The University of Frankfurt am Main

The institute has fostered research and, during its Frankfurt periods, provided university instruction in sociology. To advance both missions, the institute appointed Axel Honneth, Professor of Social Philosophy at Goethe University Frankfurt and the Jack B. Weinstein Professor of the Humanities in the philosophy department at Columbia University. After his 2018 resignation, sociologist Ferdinand Sutterlüty served as acting director until 2021, when sociologist Stephan Lessenich succeeded him on a permanent basis.
