= Carl Grünberg =

Austrian economist, economic historian and sociologist

- Born: 10 February 1861; Focșani, Principality of Romania
- Died: 2 February 1940 (aged 78); Frankfurt, Germany
- Relatives: Jean Gruenberg (grandson)

Carl Grünberg (Austrian German: [ˈɡryːnbɛrɡ]; 10 February 1861 – 2 February 1940) was an Austrian Marxist economist, economic historian and sociologist. He is considered the father of Austromarxism and was the founding director of the Frankfurt Institute for Social Research.

== Biography ==
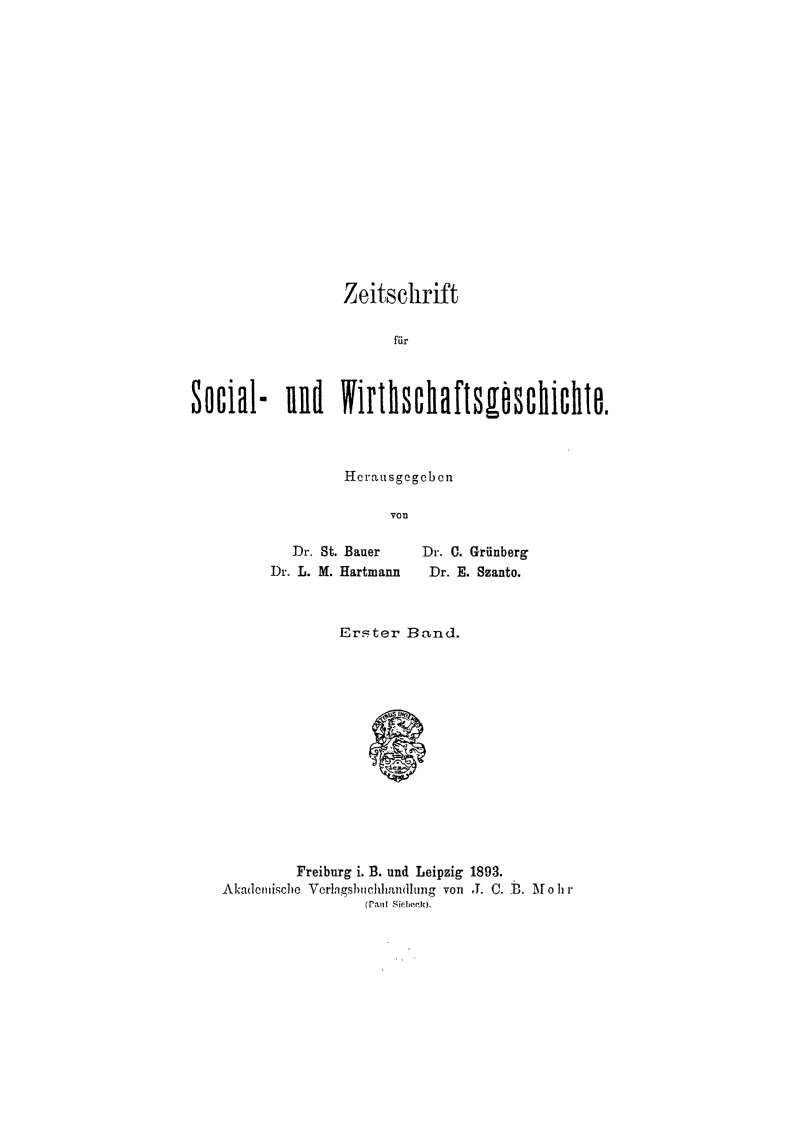
Frontpage of Zeitschrift für Social- und Wirtgschaftsgeschichte, vol. 1 (1893)

Born in Focșani, Romania, into a Jewish-Bessarabia German family, Grünberg attended Gymnasium (grammar school) in Czernowitz, the main town of Bukovina, then part of the Austro-Hungarian Empire. In 1881 he moved to Vienna, where he studied law, in particular under Lorenz von Stein and Anton Menger, graduating with a Doctor of Law degree in 1886. After working as a legal clerk, he received the attorney's certificate in 1890. Then he went to Strasbourg (Alsace was then part of the German Empire), where he studied economics with Georg Friedrich Knapp and Gustav Schmoller. In 1892, Grünberg was baptised a Catholic. After his return to Vienna, he practised as a lawyer before joining the judiciary as a district judge in 1897.

At the same time, he completed his habilitation in political economy in 1894 and became an unpaid lecturer (Privatdozent) at the University of Vienna. Only in 1899 did he receive a paid teaching position and could give up his breadwinning judiciary job. He supervised Ludwig von Mises's doctoral thesis, completed and published in 1902, with the degree awarded in 1906. In 1909 he obtained a full professorship and in 1912 he was, against strong opposition, appointed to the chair of modern economic history. Carl Grünberg was the father of Austromarxism. Among his students were Max Adler, Friedrich Adler, Otto Bauer, Rudolf Hilferding and Karl Renner. After Austria was proclaimed a republic and the Social Democrats entered the government, Grünberg was appointed to the chair of political economy and national economic policy in 1919.

In 1924 he became the first director of the Institute for Social Research, later known as the Frankfurt School. He established and edited a journal of labour and socialist history, the Zeitschrift für Social- und Wirtschaftsgeschichte (1893) and the Archiv für die Geschichte des Sozialismus und der sozialen Bewegung (1911), a journal that is known today as the Grünberg-Archiv (Archive for the History of Socialism and the Workers' Movement). Under his leadership the institute worked closely with the Marx–Engels Institute in Moscow. After having suffered from a stroke, he retired in 1929 and left the Institute to Max Horkheimer. In 1931 he became an honorary member of the Academy of Sciences of the Soviet Union.

== Works ==
- Die Bauernbefreiung: Und die Auflösung des Gutsherrlich-Bäuerlichen Verhältnisses in Böhmen, Mähren und Schlesien (Leipzig 1893)
- Sozialismus, Kommunismus, Anarchismus (Jena 1897)
- Studien zur österreichischen Agrargeschichte (Leipzig 1901)
