= Frankfurt School =

School of sociology and critical theory

The Frankfurt School is a school of thought in sociology and critical theory. It is associated with the Institute for Social Research, founded on February 3, 1923, at the University of Frankfurt am Main (today known as Goethe University Frankfurt). Formed during the Weimar Republic during the European interwar period, the first generation of the Frankfurt School was composed of intellectuals, academics, and political dissidents dissatisfied with the socio-economic systems of the 1930s: namely, capitalism, fascism, and communism. Significant figures associated with the school include Max Horkheimer, Theodor Adorno, Walter Benjamin, Erich Fromm, Wilhelm Reich, Herbert Marcuse, and Jürgen Habermas.

The Frankfurt theorists proposed that existing social theory was unable to explain the turbulent Political factionalism and reactionary politics, such as Nazism, in 20th-century liberal capitalist societies. Also critical of Marxism–Leninism as a philosophically inflexible system of social organization, the School's critical-theory research sought alternative paths to social development.

What unites the disparate members of the School is a shared commitment to the project of human emancipation, theoretically pursued by an attempted synthesis of the Marxist tradition, psychoanalysis, and empirical sociological research.

== History ==
=== Institute for Social Research ===
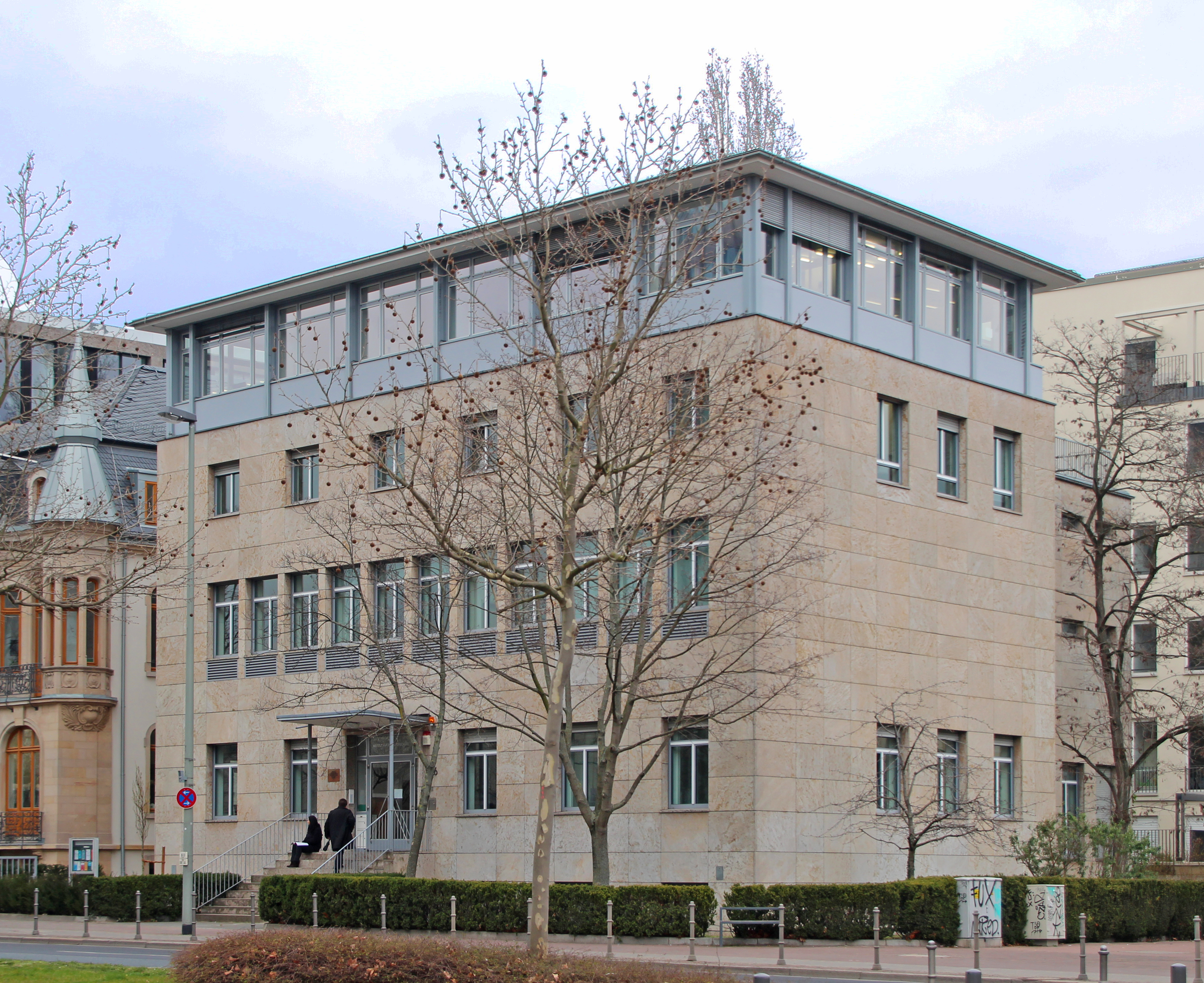
The Institute for Social Research, Frankfurt am Main, Germany

The term "Frankfurt School" describes the works of scholarship and the intellectuals who were the Institute for Social Research, an adjunct organization at the University of Frankfurt am Main, founded in 1923, by Carl Grünberg, a Marxist professor of law at the University of Vienna. It was the first Marxist research center at a German university and was funded through the largess of the wealthy student Felix Weil (1898–1975).

Weil's doctoral dissertation dealt with the practical problems of implementing socialism. In 1922, he organized the First Marxist Workweek in an effort to synthesize different trends of Marxism into a coherent, practical philosophy; the first symposium included György Lukács, Karl Korsch, Karl August Wittfogel, and Friedrich Pollock. The success of the First Marxist Workweek prompted the formal establishment of a permanent institute for social research, and Weil negotiated with the Ministry of Education to appoint a university professor as director of the Institute for Social Research, thereby ensuring that the Frankfurt School would be a university institution. Korsch and Lukács participated in the Workweek, which included the study of Marxism and Philosophy (1923), by Karl Korsch. Their Communist Party membership precluded their active participation in the Institute for Social Research; nevertheless, Korsch participated in the School's publishing venture.

The philosophical tradition of the Frankfurt School—the multi-disciplinary integration of the social sciences—is associated with the philosopher Max Horkheimer, who became the director in 1930, and recruited intellectuals such as Theodor W. Adorno (philosopher, sociologist, musicologist), Erich Fromm (psychoanalyst), and Herbert Marcuse (philosopher).

=== European interwar period (1918–39) ===
In the Weimar Republic (1918–33), the continual political turmoils of the interwar years (1918–39) much affected the development of Frankfurt School critical theory. The scholars were especially influenced by the Communists' failed German Revolution of 1918–19 and by the rise of Nazism (1933–45), a German form of fascism. To explain such reactionary politics, the Frankfurt scholars applied critical selections of Marxist philosophy to interpret, illuminate, and explain the origins and causes of reactionary socioeconomics in 20th-century Europe (a type of political economy unknown to Marx in the 19th century). The School's further intellectual development derived from the publication, in the 1930s, of the Economic and Philosophical Manuscripts of 1844 (1932) and The German Ideology (1932), which were interpreted as showing a continuity between Hegelianism and Marxist philosophy.

As the anti-intellectual threat of Nazism increased to political violence, the founders decided to move the Institute for Social Research out of Nazi Germany (1933–45). Soon after Adolf Hitler's rise to power in 1933, the Institute first moved from Frankfurt to Geneva, and then to New York City in 1935, where it joined Columbia University. The School's journal, the Zeitschrift für Sozialforschung ("Journal of Social Research"), was renamed "Studies in Philosophy and Social Science". This began the period of the School's important work in Marxist critical theory. By the 1950s, the paths of scholarship led Horkheimer, Adorno, and Pollock to return to West Germany, while Marcuse, Löwenthal, and Kirchheimer remained in the U.S. In 1953, the Institute for Social Research (Frankfurt School) was formally re-established in Frankfurt, West Germany.

== Critical theory ==
The works of the Frankfurt School are to be understood in the context of the intellectual and practical objectives of critical theory. In "Traditional and Critical Theory" (1937), Max Horkheimer defined critical theory as social critique intended to effect sociological change and realize intellectual emancipation, through an enlightenment that is not dogmatic in its assumptions. Critical theory analyzes the true significance of the ruling understandings (the dominant ideology) generated in bourgeois society to show that the dominant ideology misrepresents how human relations occur in the real world and how capitalism justifies and legitimates the domination of people.

According to the theory of cultural hegemony, the dominant ideology is a ruling-class narrative that provides an explanatory justification for the current power structure of society. Nonetheless, the story told through the ruling understandings conceals as much as it reveals about society. The task of the Frankfurt School was the sociological analysis and interpretation of areas of social relations that Marx did not discuss in the 19th century—especially the base and superstructure aspects of capitalist society.

Horkheimer opposed critical theory to traditional theory, wherein the word theory is used in the positivistic sense of scientism, as a purely observational mode that finds and establishes scientific law (generalizations) about the real world. Social sciences differ from natural sciences because their scientific generalizations cannot be readily derived from experience. The researcher's understanding of a social experience is always filtered through their biases. What the researcher does not understand is that they operate within an historical and ideological context. The results for the theory being tested would conform to the ideas of the researcher rather than the facts of the experience proper; in "Traditional and Critical Theory" (1937), Horkheimer said:

The facts, which our senses present to us, are socially performed in two ways: through the historical character of the object perceived, and through the historical character of the perceiving organ. Both are not simply natural; they are shaped by human activity, and yet the individual perceives himself as receptive and passive in the act of perception.

For Horkheimer, the methods of investigation applicable to the social sciences cannot imitate the scientific method applicable to the natural sciences. In that vein, the theoretical approaches of positivism and pragmatism, of neo-Kantianism and phenomenology failed to surpass the ideological constraints that restricted their application to social science, because of the inherent logico–mathematic prejudice that separates theory from actual life, i.e. such methods of investigation seek a logic that is always true and independent of, and without consideration for, continuing human activity in the field under study. He felt that the appropriate response to such a dilemma was the development of a critical theory of Marxism.

Horkheimer believed the problem was epistemological. He called for a reconsideration of "not merely the scientist, but the knowing individual, in general." Unlike orthodox Marxism, which applies a template to critique and to action, critical theory is self-critical, with no claim to the universality of absolute truth. As such, it does not grant primacy to matter (materialism) or consciousness (idealism), because each epistemology distorts the reality under study to the benefit of a small group. In practice, critical theory is outside the philosophical strictures of traditional theory; however, as a way of thinking and of recovering humanity's self-knowledge, critical theory draws investigational resources and methods from Marxism.

=== Dialectical method ===
In contrast to modes of reasoning that view things in abstraction, each by itself and as though endowed with fixed properties, Hegel's "dialectical" innovation was to consider reality in terms of its movement and change over time, according to the interrelations and interactions of its various components or "moments". The Frankfurt School attempted to reformulate Hegel's idealistic dialectics into a more concrete method of investigation.

According to Hegel, human history can be reconstructed to show that what is rational in reality results from the overcoming of past contradictions. It is an intelligible process of human activity, the Weltgeist, which is the idea of progress towards a specific human condition; namely, the actualization of human freedom. However, the problem of future contingents (considerations about the future) did not interest Hegel, for whom philosophy cannot be prescriptive and normative, because philosophy comprehends only in hindsight. The study of history is limited to descriptions of past and present human realities. For Hegel and his successors (the right Hegelians), philosophy can only describe what is rational in the reality of the present, which in Hegel's time was Christianity and the Prussian state.

Karl Marx and the young Hegelians strongly criticized that perspective. According to them, Hegel had over-reached in his abstract conception of "absolute reason" and had failed to notice the "real"—that is, undesirable and irrational—life conditions of the proletariat. Marx claims to invert Hegel's idealist dialectics in his own theory of dialectical materialism, arguing that "it is not the consciousness of men that determines their being, but that their social being that determines their consciousness." Marx's theory follows a materialist conception of history and geographic space, where the development of the productive forces is the primary motive force for historical change. The social and material contradictions inherent to capitalism must lead to its negation, which, according to this theory, will be the replacement of capitalism with communism, a new, rational form of society.

Marx used dialectical analysis to uncover the contradictions in the predominant ideas of society, and in the social relations to which they are linked—exposing the underlying struggle between opposing forces. Only by becoming aware of the dialectic (i.e., attaining class consciousness) of such opposing forces in a power struggle can men and women intellectually liberate themselves and change the existing social order through social progress. The Frankfurt School understood that a dialectical method could only be adopted if it could be applied to itself; if they adopted a self-correcting method—a dialectical method that would enable the correction of previous, false interpretations of the dialectical investigation. Accordingly, critical theory rejected the historicism and materialism of orthodox Marxism.

=== Critique of capitalist ideology ===
==== Dialectic of Enlightenment ====
Adorno and Horkheimer's Dialectic of Enlightenment, written during the Institute's exile in America, was published in 1944. While retaining many Marxist insights, this work shifted emphasis from a critique of the material forces of production to a critique of the social and ideological forces brought about by early capitalism. The Dialectic of Enlightenment uses the Odyssey as a paradigm for their analysis of bourgeois consciousness. In this work, Adorno and Horkheimer introduce many themes that are central to subsequent social thought. Their exposition of the domination of nature as a central characteristic of instrumental rationality and its application within the capitalism of the post-Enlightenment era was made long before ecology and environmentalism became popular concerns.

They claim that Instrumental rationality is the new means of cultural reproduction within the mechanical age. It is a fusion of domination and technological rationality that brings all of external and internal nature under the power of the human subject. In the process, the subject gets swallowed up, and no social force analogous to the proletariat can be identified that could enable the subject to emancipate itself.

They contend that, at a time when it appears that reality itself has become the basis for ideology, the greatest contribution that critical theory can make is to explore the dialectical contradictions of individual subjective experience, on the one hand, and to preserve the truth of theory, on the other. Even dialectical progress is put into doubt: "Its truth or untruth is not inherent in the method itself, but in its intention in the historical process." This intention must be oriented toward integral freedom and happiness: "The only philosophy which can be responsibly practiced in face of despair is the attempt to contemplate all things as they would present themselves from the standpoint of redemption."

From a sociological point of view, Adorno and Horkheimer's works demonstrate an ambivalence concerning the ultimate source of social domination, an ambivalence that gave rise to the "pessimism" of critical theory about the possibility of human emancipation and freedom. This ambivalence was rooted in the historical circumstances in which the work was originally produced, in particular, the rise of Nazism, state capitalism, and mass culture as entirely new forms of social domination that could not be adequately explained within the terms of traditional Marxist sociology. For Adorno and Horkheimer, state intervention in the economy had effectively abolished the tension in capitalism between the "relations of production" and "material productive forces of society"—a tension that, according to traditional Marxist theory, constituted the primary contradiction within capitalism. The previously "free" market (as an "unconscious" mechanism for the distribution of goods) and "irrevocable" private property of Marx's epoch have gradually been replaced by the more central role of management hierarchies at the firm level and macroeconomic interventions at the state level in contemporary Western societies. The dialectic through which Marx predicted the emancipation of modern society was suppressed, effectively subjugated to a positivist rationality of domination.

Philosopher and critical theorist Nikolas Kompridis writes:

According to the now canonical view of its history, Frankfurt School critical theory began in the 1930s as a fairly confident interdisciplinary and materialist research program, the general aim of which was to connect normative social criticism to the emancipatory potential latent in concrete historical processes. Only a decade or so later, however, having revisited the premises of their philosophy of history, Horkheimer and Adorno's Dialectic of Enlightenment steered the whole enterprise, provocatively and self-consciously, into a skeptical cul-de-sac.

Kompridis argues that this "sceptical cul-de-sac" was arrived at with "a lot of help from the once unspeakable and unprecedented barbarity of European fascism" and could not be gotten out of without "some well-marked [exit or] Ausgang, showing the way out of the ever-recurring nightmare in which Enlightenment hopes and Holocaust horrors are fatally entangled." However, Ausgang, according to Kompridis, this would not come until later—purportedly in the form of Jürgen Habermas's work on the intersubjective bases of communicative rationality.

In psychoanalytic terms, consumption culture and mass media displaced the role of a father figure in the paternalistic family. Rather than serving to liberate society from patriarchal authority, however, this merely replaced it with the authority of the "totally administered" society. Christopher Lasch criticized subsequent liberatory movements of the 1960s for failing to reckon with this dynamic, which in his view led to a "culture of narcissism". Lasch believed the "later Frankfurt School" tended to ground political criticisms too much on psychiatric diagnoses like the authoritarian personality: "This procedure excused them from the difficult work of judgment and argumentation. Instead of arguing with opponents, they simply dismissed them on psychiatric grounds."

==== Art and music criticism ====
Walter Benjamin's essay "The Work of Art in the Age of Mechanical Reproduction" is a canonical text in art history and film studies. Benjamin is optimistic about the potential of commodified works of art to introduce radical political views to the proletariat. In contrast, Adorno and Horkheimer saw the rise of the culture industry as promoting homogeneity of thought and entrenching existing authorities. For instance, Adorno (a trained classical pianist) polemicized against popular music because it had become part of the culture industry of advanced capitalist society and the false consciousness that contributes to social domination. He argued that radical art and music may preserve the truth by capturing the reality of human suffering. Hence, "What radical music perceives is the untransfigured suffering of man.... The seismographic registration of traumatic shock becomes, at the same time, the technical structural law of music".

This view of modern art as producing truth only through the negation of traditional aesthetic form and norms of beauty, because they have become ideological, is characteristic of Adorno and the Frankfurt School generally. In particular, Adorno criticized jazz and popular music, viewing them as part of the culture industry that contributes to the sustainability of capitalism by rendering it "aesthetically pleasing" and "agreeable". Martin Jay has called the attack on jazz the least successful aspect of Adorno's work in America.

== Praxis ==
Members of the Frankfurt School were academics and generally avoided (direct) political action or praxis. Max Horkheimer opposed any revolutionary rhetoric in the institute's publications, since it could jeopardize funding from the West German government. Theodor Adorno showed some sympathy to student movements, particularly after the killing of Benno Ohnesorg, but he did not believe street violence had the potential to effect change. Angela Davis, a student of Marcuse, recounted advice given to her by Adorno that critical theorists working in the radical movements of the 1960s were, "akin to a media studies scholar deciding to become a radio technician".

In The Theory of the Novel (1971), György Lukács criticized the "leading German intelligentsia", including some members of the Frankfurt School (Adorno is named explicitly), as inhabiting the Grand Hotel Abyss, a metaphorical place from which the theorists comfortably analyze the abyss, the world beyond. Lukács described this contradictory situation as follows: They inhabit "a beautiful hotel, equipped with every comfort, on the edge of an abyss, of nothingness, of absurdity. And the daily contemplation of the abyss, between excellent meals or artistic entertainments, can only heighten the enjoyment of the subtle comforts offered."

The singular exception to this was Herbert Marcuse, who engaged with the new left in the 1960s and 1970s. Marcuse's One-Dimensional Man described the containment of the working class by material consumption and mass media that diverted any possibility of a proletarian revolution. Although Marcuse considered this pessimistic state of affairs to be fait accompli when the book was published in 1964, he was surprised and pleased when almost immediately the civil rights movement intensified and serious opposition to the Vietnam war began. Student activists such as the Students for a Democratic Society in turn took an interest in Marcuse and his works. Formerly an obscure academic émigré, he rapidly became a controversial public intellectual known as the "Guru of the New Left". Marcuse did not aim for narrow, incremental reforms but for the "Great Refusal" of all existing culture and "total revolution" against capitalism. In the democratic protest movements, Marcuse saw agents of change that could supplement the quiescent working class and unite with third-world communist revolutionaries. Marcuse took an active role in the New Left, organizing events with students in the United States and the West German student movement.

Marcuse's relationship with Horkheimer and Adorno was strained by their divergence of opinion about the student movements. The Socialist German Students' Union was harshly critical of Adorno for his lack of political engagement and would disrupt his lectures. When a student's room was trashed for refusing to take part in protests, Adorno wrote, "praxis serves as an ideological pretext for exercising moral constraint." Adorno further said it was a manifestation of the authoritarian personality. Adorno's student Hans-Jürgen Krahl was also critical of Adorno's inaction. When, in January 1969, Krahl led a group of students to occupy a room, Adorno called the police to remove them, further angering the students. Marcuse criticized Adorno's decision to call the police, writing, "I reject the unmediated translation of theory into praxis just as emphatically as you do. But I do believe that there are situations, moments, in which theory is pushed on further by praxis—situations and moments in which theory that is kept separate from praxis becomes untrue to itself".

In the 1970s, perceiving the limitations of the new left, Marcuse de-emphasized the third world and revolutionary violence in favor of a focus on social issues in the United States. He sought to recruit other movements on the political periphery, such as environmentalism and feminism, to a popular front for socialism. During this period, he spoke enthusiastically about women's liberation, seeing in it echoes of his earlier work in Eros and Civilization. Seeing that the revolutionary moment of the 1960s was over, Marcuse advised students to avoid even a suggestion of violence. Instead, he advocated the "long march through the institutions" and recommended educational institutions as a refuge for radicals in the U.S.

== Criticism ==
=== Psychoanalytic categorization ===
The historian Christopher Lasch criticized the Frankfurt School for their initial tendency to "automatically" reject opposing political criticisms, based upon "psychiatric" grounds:

The Authoritarian Personality [1950] had a tremendous influence on [Richard] Hofstadter, and other liberal intellectuals, because it showed them how to conduct political criticism in psychiatric categories, [and] to make those categories bear the weight of political criticism. This procedure excused them from the difficult work of judgment and argumentation. Instead of arguing with opponents, they simply dismissed them on psychiatric grounds.

=== Economics and communications media ===
During the 1980s, anti-authoritarian socialists in the United Kingdom and New Zealand criticized the rigid, deterministic view of popular culture in the Frankfurt School's theories of capitalist culture, which seemed to preclude any prefigurative role for social critique in such work. They argued that EC Comics often did contain such cultural critiques. Recent criticism of the Frankfurt School by the libertarian Cato Institute focused on the claim that culture has grown more sophisticated and diverse as a consequence of free markets and the availability of niche cultural text for niche audiences.

== See also ==
- Analytical Marxism
- Centre for Contemporary Cultural Studies
- Cultural Marxism conspiracy theory
- Eurocommunism
- Fredric Jameson
- Freudomarxism
- Georg Simmel
- Gerhard Stapelfeldt
- Karl Mannheim
- Leo Kofler
- Lumpenproletariat
- Marxist cultural analysis
- Neo-Gramscianism
- Neo-Marxism
- Neue Marx-Lektüre
- Psychoanalytic sociology
- School of suspicion
- Social conflict theory
- Zygmunt Bauman
