= Who Are You, Mr. Sorge? =

1961 film by Yves Ciampi

- Directed by: Yves Ciampi
- Written by: Yves Ciampi; Hans-Otto Meissner; Tsutomu Sawamura
- Produced by: Jacques Bar
- Starring: Thomas Holtzmann; Mario Adorf
- Cinematography: Emile Vilerbue; Toshio Ubukata
- Music by: Serge Nigg
- Production companies: Shôchiku Eiga; Terra Films; Silver Films
- Release date: March 29, 1961
- Running time: 129 minutes
- Countries: France; Japan
- Languages: French; Japanese
- Box office: 39.2 million tickets (Soviet Union)

Who Are You, Mr. Sorge? is a 1961 French–Japanese drama film directed by Yves Ciampi. The original French-language name is Qui êtes-vous, Monsieur Sorge?

== Plot ==
Since 1937, Richard Sorge was employed in the German embassy in Tokyo. He was known as a doctor of sociology, who did not shun to become a front-line correspondent, as a pleasant, erudite interlocutor, in a word, as a true Aryan. They didn't know only one thing: behind his reporter's activities there was a secret mission, establishing contact with Moscow through a resident in Hong Kong.

== Cast ==
- Thomas Holtzmann as Richard Sorge
- Mario Adorf as Max Clausen
- Akira Yamauchi as Hotsumi Ozaki
- Jacques Berthier as Serge Branovski
- Kōji Nanbara as Yotoku Miyagi
- Nadine Basile as Anna Clausen
- Keiko Kishi as Yuki Sakurai

== Background ==
Since 1939, Sorge and Clausen had sent over 141 radio messages and numerous microfilms to Moscow. To his arrest on 18 October 1941, the observation of Japanese exile communists led by the Japanese secret police Tokko. In the course of which one of his contacts was exposed. On November 7, 1944, the anniversary of the October Revolution, Richard Sorge was hanged in Japan.

The German diplomat and writer Hans-Otto Meissner plays in the film itself.
