= Spy Sorge =

2003 film by Masahiro Shinoda

- Film poster
- Directed by: Masahiro Shinoda
- Screenplay by: Masahiro Shinoda; Robert Mandy
- Produced by: Masaru Koibuchi; Masato Hara; Manfred Durniok; Peter Rawley; Yoshishige Shimatani
- Starring: Iain Glen; Masahiro Motoki; Kippei Shiina; Takaya Kamikawa; Riona Hazuki
- Cinematography: Tatsuo Suzuki
- Edited by: Hiroshi Okuda
- Music by: Shin'ichirō Ikebe
- Production companies: Asmik Ace Entertainment; Imagica; NTC; Obic; Sammy Corporation; Sega; Toho; TV Asahi
- Distributed by: Toho
- Release date: June 14, 2003 (Japan)
- Running time: 182 minutes
- Country: Japan
- Languages: Japanese; English
- Budget: ¥2 billion
- Box office: ¥760 million

Spy Sorge (Japanese: スパイ・ゾルゲ, Hepburn: Supai Zoruge) is a 2003 Japanese historical drama biographical film co-written and directed by Masahiro Shinoda, about the World War II-era Soviet spy Richard Sorge. It stars Scottish actor Iain Glen in the title role. Shinoda intended the film, a long and lavish production, to be his final feature. True to his word, the director died 22 years later without having directed another film.

Spy Sorge achieved only modest critical success and failed to recoup its budget at the box office. Despite this, the film received multiple nominations at the 27th Japan Academy Awards.

== Plot ==
The film presents the life of Richard Sorge (Iain Glen), a German spy for the Main Intelligence Directorate (GRU) of the Soviet Army in Japan. Sorge and his contact Hotsumi Ozaki (Masahiro Motoki) are arrested by the Tokubetsu Kōtō Keisatsu (Special Higher Police) in Tokyo, and Sorge recounts the main events in flashbacks.

== Cast ==
- Iain Glen: Richard Sorge
- Masahiro Motoki: Hotsumi Ozaki
- Kippei Shiina: Mitsusada Yoshikawa
- Takaya Kamikawa: Tokko T
- Toshiya Nagasawa: Miyagi Yotoku
- Riona Hazuki: Hanako Miyake
- Koyuki: Yoshiko Yamazaki
- Armin Marewski : Branko Vukelic
- Yui Natsukawa: Hideko Ozaki
- Takaaki Enoki: Duke Fumimaro Konoye
- Hideji Otaki: Duke Kinmochi Sai-onji
- Michael Christian: Josef Albert Meisinger
- Shima Iwashita: Mrs. Konoe
- Ulrich Mühe: Eugen Ott
- Wolfgang S. Zechmayer: Max Christiansen-Clausen
- Mia Yu: Agnes Smedley
- Hanayagi Juraku: Emperor Hirohito
- Maro Akaji: Sugiyama Hajime
- Mitsuru Fukikoshi: Saionji Kenkazu
- Shingo Tsurumi: Ushiba Tomohiko
- Dō Haraguchi: Shigeru Honjō
- Naoto Takenaka: Hideki Tojo
- Tsuruoka Daijirō: Yasuhide Kurihara
- Youichi Okamura: Taketora Ogata
- Tatsu Kaneko: Takahashi Korekiyo
- Marek Wlodarczyk: Yan Karlovich Berzin
- Jurij Rosstalnyi: Semyon Uritsky
- Robert Mika: Lavrentiy Beria
- Peter Borchert: Joseph Stalin

== Technical details ==
- Writers: Robert Mandy & Masahiro Shinoda
- Producers: Masato Hara, Masaru Koibuchi & Peter Rawley for Asmik Ace Entertainment & Manfred Durniok Filmproduktion
- Music: Shin’ichirō Ikebe
- Photography: Tatsuo Suzuki
- Length: Japan: 182 min
- Country: Japan / Germany
- Language: Japanese
- Colour: Colour
- Sound: Dolby Digital

== Awards and nominations ==
27th Japanese Academy Awards

- Won: Best Art Direction (Hajime Oikawa)
- Nominated: Best Film
- Nominated: Best Director (Masahiro Shinoda)
- Nominated: Best Screenplay (Masahiro Shinoda, Robert Mandy)
- Nominated: Best Cinematography (Tatsuo Suzuki)
- Nominated: Best Editing (Hiroshi Okuda)
- Nominated: Best Music Score (Shin'ichirō Ikebe)
- Nominated: Best Lighting (Hideshi Mikami)
- Nominated: Best Sound (Tetsuo Segawa)

58th Mainichi Film Awards

- Won: Mainichi Film Award for Excellence Film (shared with Like Asura, Zatōichi and Doppelganger)

== Release ==
Spy Sorge was released in theaters in Japan on June 14, 2003. The film was also intended for international theatrical distribution, but these plans were cancelled after it became a box-office bomb in its native country. Central Partnership planned for a theatrical release in Russia, but this was also cancelled; it was released straight to VHS and DVD in that country instead.

== Home media ==
The film was released on VHS and DVD on November 21, 2003 by Asmik Ace Entertainment in Japan, and on February 12, 2004 by CP Digital in Russia.
