= Richard Sorge =

German journalist and Soviet spy (1895–1944)

Hero of the Soviet Union Richard Sorge
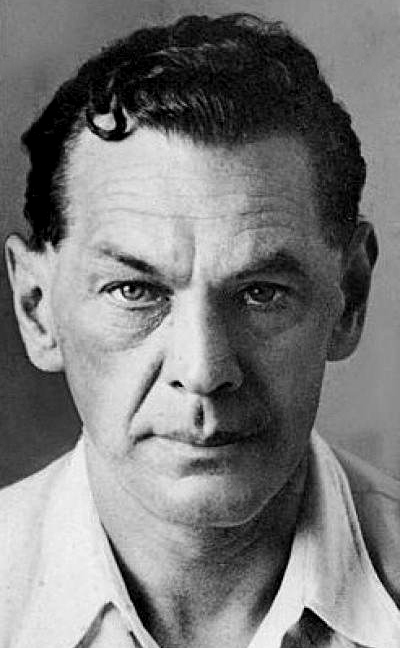
- Sorge before 1941
- Born: 4 October 1895; Sabunçu, Baku, Baku Governorate, Caucasus Viceroyalty (now Azerbaijan)
- Died: 7 November 1944 (aged 49); Sugamo Prison, Tokyo, Japan
- Cause of death: Execution by hanging
- Education: University of Kiel; Humboldt University of Berlin; University of Hamburg
- Occupation: Journalist (Frankfurter Zeitung)
- Criminal charge: Espionage
- Criminal penalty: Death
- Criminal status: Executed
- Spouses: Christiane Gerlach (m. 1921; div. 1929) Ekaterina Alexandrovna (m. 1929)
- Parent: Gustav Wilhelm Richard Sorge
- Awards: Order of Lenin; Iron Cross
- Espionage activity
- Country: Germany; China; Japan
- Allegiance: Soviet Union
- Agency: Main Intelligence Directorate
- Service years: 1920–1943
- Codename: Ramsay
- Military career
- Allegiance: Germany
- Branch: Imperial German Army
- Conflicts: World War I; Western Front; Second Battle of Ypres (WIA); Eastern Front (WIA)

Richard Gustavovich Sorge (Russian: Рихард Густавович Зорге, romanized: Rikhard Gustavovich Zorge; 4 October 1895 – 7 November 1944) was a German journalist and Soviet military intelligence officer who was active before and during World War II and worked undercover as a German journalist in both Nazi Germany and the Empire of Japan. His codename was "Ramsay" (Рамза́й).

Sorge is known for his service in Japan in 1940 and 1941, when he provided information about Adolf Hitler's plan to attack the Soviet Union. Then, in mid-September 1941, he informed the Soviets that Japan would not attack the Soviet Union in the near future. A month later, Sorge was arrested in Japan for espionage. He was subsequently tortured, forced to confess, tried, and eventually hanged in November 1944.

He was posthumously awarded the title of Hero of the Soviet Union in 1964.

== Early life ==
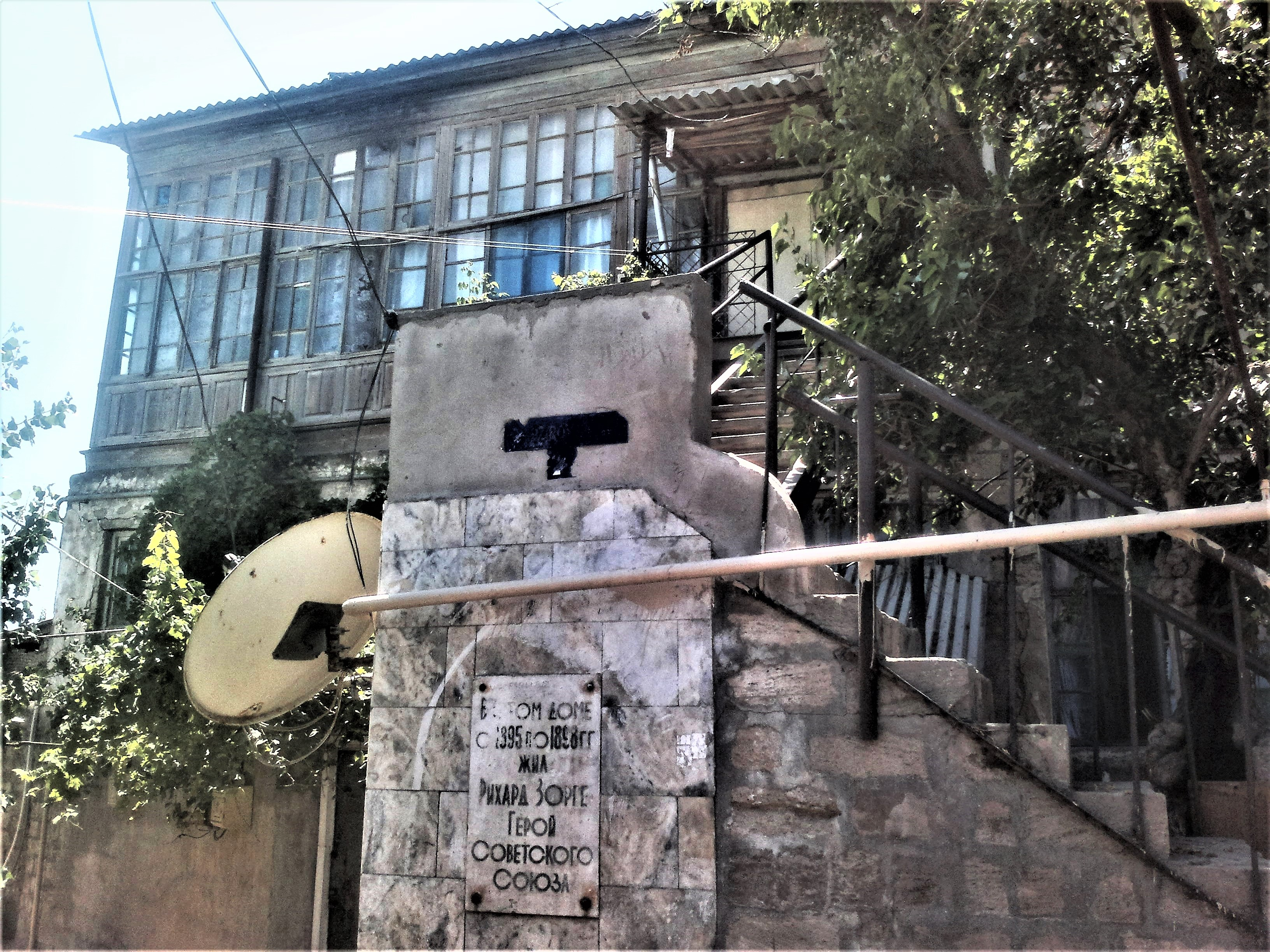
House in Sabunchu, Azerbaijan, in which Sorge lived from 1895 to 1898

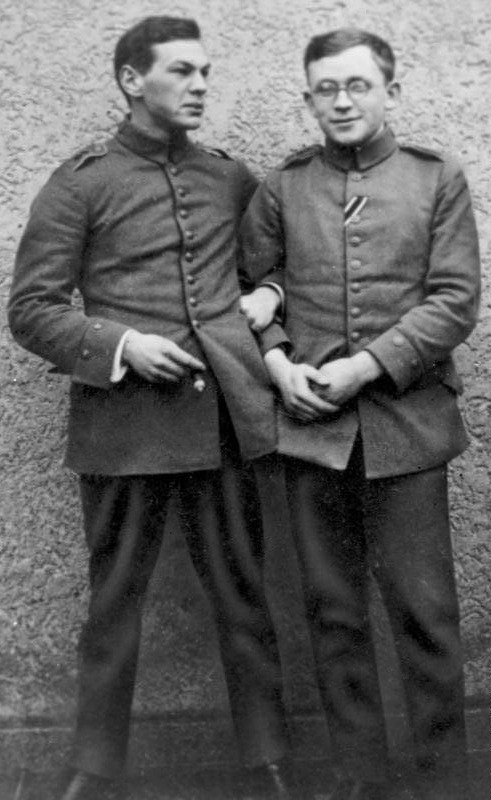
Sorge (left) and chemist Erich Correns during World War I in 1915

Sorge was born on 4 October 1895 in the settlement of Sabunchi, a suburb of Baku, then part of the Russian Empire (now Azerbaijan). He was the youngest of the nine children of Gustav Wilhelm Richard Sorge (1852–1907), a German mining engineer employed by the Deutsche Petroleum-Aktiengesellschaft (DPAG) and the Caucasian oil company Branobel and his Russian wife, Nina Semionovna Kobieleva. His father moved back to Germany with his family in 1898, after his lucrative contract expired. In Sorge's own words:

The one thing that made my life a little different from the average was a strong awareness of the fact that I had been born in the southern Caucasus and that we had moved to Berlin when I was very small.

Sorge attended Oberrealschule Lichterfelde when he was six. He described his father as having political views that were "unmistakably nationalist and imperialist", which he shared as a young man. However, the cosmopolitan Sorge household was "very different from the average bourgeois home in Berlin". Sorge considered Friedrich Adolf Sorge, an associate of Karl Marx and Friedrich Engels, to be his grandfather, but he was actually Sorge's great-uncle.

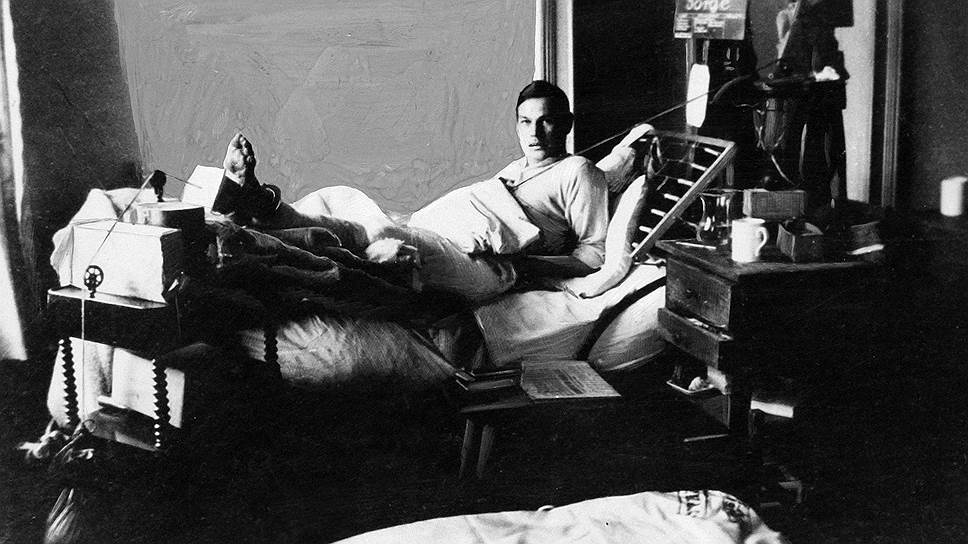
Sorge in the hospital after his injury during the First World War

Sorge enlisted in the Imperial German Army in October 1914, shortly after the outbreak of the First World War. At 18, he was posted to a reserve infantry battalion of the 3rd Guards Division. He initially served on the Western Front and was wounded at the Second Battle of Ypres in 1915. After a period of convalescence in Berlin, Sorge was transferred to the Eastern Front and promoted to the rank of corporal. He was seriously wounded again in April 1917, shrapnel severed three of his fingers and broke both his legs, causing a lifelong limp. Afterward, Sorge was awarded the Iron Cross, Second Class for bravery. He was subsequently declared medically unfit for service and discharged from the army. After serving in the war, Sorge, who had started out in 1914 as a right-wing nationalist, became disillusioned by what he called the "meaninglessness" of the conflict and gravitated to the political left.

During his convalescence he read Marx, Engels and Rudolf Hilferding and eventually became a communist, mainly by the influence of the father of a nurse with whom he had developed a relationship. He spent the remainder of the war studying philosophy and economics at the universities of Kiel, Berlin and Hamburg. In Kiel, he worked as an assistant to the eminent sociologist Kurt Albert Gerlach and also witnessed the sailors' mutiny which helped spark the German Revolution. He later joined the Independent Social Democratic Party and moved to Berlin, but arrived too late to participate in the Spartacist uprising.

Sorge received his doctorate in political science (Dr. rer. pol.) from Hamburg in August 1919. By this time he had joined the Communist Party of Germany (KPD), and was engaged as an activist for the party in Hamburg and subsequently Aachen. His political views got him fired from both a teaching job and coal mining work.

== Soviet military intelligence agent ==
Sorge was recruited as an agent for Soviet intelligence. With the cover of a journalist, he was sent to various European countries to assess the possibility of communist revolutions.

From 1920 to 1922, Sorge lived in Solingen, in present-day North Rhine-Westphalia, Germany. He was joined there by Christiane Gerlach, the ex-wife of Kurt Albert Gerlach, a wealthy communist and professor of political science in Kiel, who had taught Sorge. Christiane Gerlach later remembered about meeting Sorge for the first time: "It was as if a stroke of lightning ran through me. In this one second something awoke in me that had slumbered until now, something dangerous, dark, inescapable...".

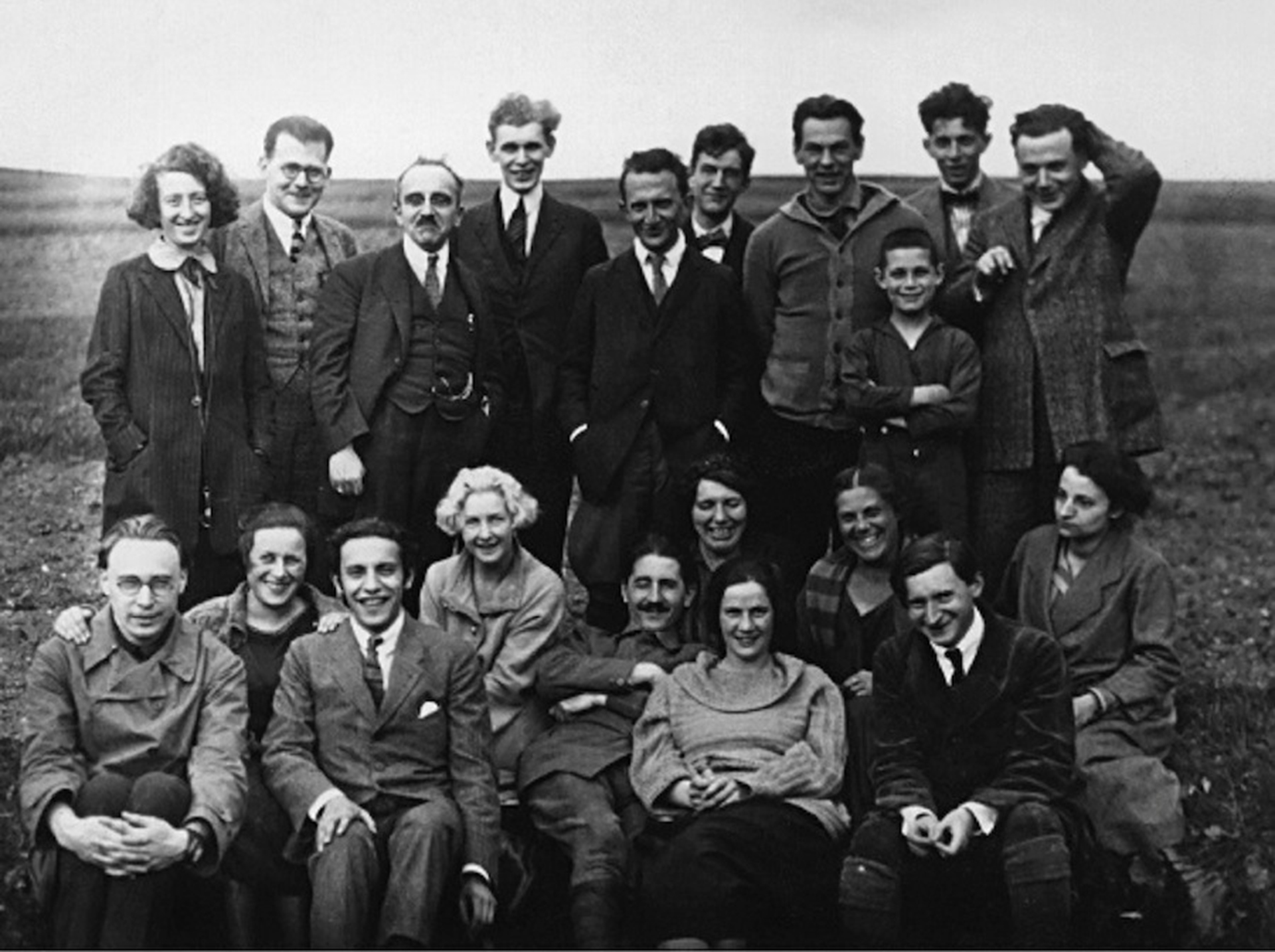
Group photo, standing from left to right: Hede Massing, Friedrich Pollock, Edward Alexander Ludwig, Konstantin Zetkin, Georg Lukács, Julian Gumperz, Richard Sorge, Karl Alexander (child), Felix Weil, Fukumoto Kazuo, sitting: Karl August Wittfogel, Rose Wittfogel, unknown, Christiane Sorge, Karl Korsch, Hedda Korsch, Käthe Weil, Margarete Lissauer, Bela Fogarasi, Gertrud Alexander (1 May 1923).

Sorge and Christiane married in May 1921. In 1922, he was relocated to Frankfurt, where he gathered intelligence about the business community. In the summer of 1923, he took part in the Erste Marxistische Arbeitswoche ("First Marxist Work Week") Conference in Ilmenau. Sorge continued his work as a journalist and also helped organize the library of the Institute for Social Research, a new Marxist think tank in Frankfurt.

In 1924, he was made responsible for the security of a Soviet delegation attending the KPD's congress in Frankfurt. He caught the attention of one of the delegates, Osip Piatnitsky, a senior official with the Communist International, who recruited him. That year, he and Christiane moved to Moscow, where he officially joined the International Liaison Department of the Comintern, which was also an OGPU intelligence-gathering body. Apparently, Sorge's dedication to duty led to his divorce. In 1925, he joined the Soviet Communist Party and received Soviet citizenship. Initially he worked as an assistant in the information department and was later the political and scientific secretary of the organizational department of the Marx–Engels–Lenin Institute in Moscow.

After several years he became enmeshed in the factional struggles in the communist movement that occurred between the death of Vladimir Lenin and the consolidation of power by Joseph Stalin, being accused of supporting Stalin's last factional opponent, Nikolai Bukharin, alongside three of his German comrades. However, in 1929, Sorge was invited to join the Red Army's Fourth Department (the later GRU, or military intelligence) by department head Yan Karlovich Berzin. He remained with the department for the rest of his life.

In 1929, Sorge went to the United Kingdom to study the labour movement there, the status of the Communist Party of Great Britain and the country's political and economic conditions. He was instructed to remain undercover and to stay out of politics. In November 1929, Sorge was sent to Germany. He was instructed to join the Nazi Party and not to associate with any left-wing activists. As cover, he got a job with the agricultural newspaper Deutsche Getreide-Zeitung.

=== China 1930 ===
In 1930, Sorge was sent to Shanghai. His cover was his work as the editor of a German news service and for the Frankfurter Zeitung. He contacted another agent, Max Christiansen-Clausen. Sorge also met German Ursula Kuczynski and well-known American left-wing journalist Agnes Smedley, who also worked for the Frankfurter Zeitung. She introduced Sorge to Hotsumi Ozaki of the Japanese newspaper Asahi Shimbun (a future Sorge recruit) and to Hanako Ishii, with whom he would become romantically involved. Sorge recruited Kuczynski as a Soviet agent and became romantically involved with her.

Shortly after his arrival in China, he was able to send intelligence regarding plans by Chiang Kai-shek's Nationalist government for a new offensive against the Chinese Communist Party in the Chinese Civil War, based largely on information gathered from German military advisors to the Nationalists.

As a journalist, Sorge established himself as an expert on Chinese agriculture. In that role, he travelled around the country and contacted members of the Chinese Communist Party. In January 1932, Sorge reported on fighting between Chinese and Japanese troops in the streets of Shanghai. In December, he was recalled to Moscow. His performance as an agent in Shanghai had been judged as successful by Berzin, having ensured that he and his agents had escaped detection and expanded the Soviet intelligence network.

=== Moscow 1933 ===
Sorge returned to Moscow, where he wrote a book about Chinese agriculture. He also married Ekaterina Maximova ("Katya"), a woman he had met in China and brought back with him to Russia.

=== Japan 1933 ===
In May 1933, the GRU decided to have Sorge organize an intelligence network in Japan. He was given the codename "Ramsay" ("Рамзай" Ramzai or Ramzay). He first went to Berlin to renew contacts in Germany and to obtain a new newspaper assignment in Japan as cover. In September 1931, the Japanese Kwantung Army had seized the Manchuria region of China, which gave Japan another land border in Asia with the Soviet Union (previously, the Soviet Union and Japan had shared only the island of Sakhalin). At the time, several Kwantung Army generals advocated following up the seizure of Manchuria by invading the Soviet Far East, and as the Soviets had broken the Japanese Army codes, Moscow was aware of that and caused a "major Japanese war scare" in the winter of 1931–1932. Until the mid-1930s, it was Japan, rather than Germany, that was considered to be the main threat by Moscow.

Elsa Poretsky, the wife of Ignace Reiss, a fellow GRU agent, commented: "His joining the Nazi Party in his own country, where he had a well documented police record was hazardous, to say the least... his staying in the very lion's den in Berlin, while his application for membership was being processed, was indeed flirting with death".

In Berlin, he insinuated himself into the Nazi Party and read Nazi propaganda, particularly Adolf Hitler's Mein Kampf. Sorge attended so many beer halls with his new acquaintances that he gave up drinking to avoid saying anything inappropriate. His abstinence from drinking did not make his Nazi companions suspicious. It was an example of his devotion to and absorption in his mission, as he had been a heavy drinker. He later explained to Hede Massing, "That was the bravest thing I ever did. Never will I be able to drink enough to make up for this time". Later, his drinking came to undermine his work.

In Germany, he received commissions from two newspapers, the Berliner Börsen Zeitung and the Tägliche Rundschau, to report from Japan and the Nazi theoretical journal Geopolitik. Sorge was so successful at establishing his cover as an intensely Nazi journalist that when he departed Germany, Joseph Goebbels attended his farewell dinner. He went to Japan via the United States, passing through New York in August 1933.

Sorge arrived in Yokohama on 6 September 1933. After landing in Japan, Sorge became the Japan correspondent for the Frankfurter Zeitung. As it was the most prestigious newspaper in Germany, Sorge's status as its Tokyo correspondent made him, in many ways, the most senior German reporter in Japan. Sorge's reputation as a Nazi journalist who detested the Soviet Union served as an excellent cover for his espionage work. His task in Japan was more challenging than that in China: the Soviets had very few intelligence resources in Japan, so Sorge would have to build a network of agents from nothing, under much tighter surveillance than he had faced in Shanghai. Sorge was told by his GRU superiors that his mission in Japan was to "give very careful study to the question of whether or not Japan was planning to attack the USSR". After his arrest in 1941, Sorge told his captors:

This was for many years the most important duty assigned to me and my group; it would not be far wrong to say that it was the sole object of my mission in Japan.... The USSR, as it viewed the prominent role and attitude taken by the Japanese military in foreign policy after the Manchurian incident, had come to harbor a deeply implanted suspicion that Japan was planning to attack the Soviet Union, a suspicion so strong that my frequently expressed opinions to the contrary were not always fully appreciated in Moscow....

He was warned by his commanders not to have contact with either the underground Japanese Communist Party or the Soviet embassy in Tokyo. His intelligence network in Japan included the Red Army officer and radio operator Max Clausen, Hotsumi Ozaki and two other Comintern agents, Branko Vukelić, a journalist working for the French magazine, Vu, and Japanese journalist Miyagi Yotoku, who was employed by the English-language newspaper, the Japan Advertiser. Max Clausen's wife, Anna, acted as ring courier from time to time. From summer 1937, Clausen operated under the cover of his business, M Clausen Shokai, suppliers of blueprint machinery and reproduction services. The business had been set up with Soviet funds and became a commercial success. Ozaki was a Japanese man from an influential family who had grown up in Taiwan, then a Japanese colony. He was an idealistic Sinophile who believed that Japan, which had started its modernisation with the Meiji Restoration, had much to teach China. However, Ozaki was shocked by the racism of Japanese policy towards China, with the Chinese being depicted as a people fit only to be slaves. Ozaki believed that the existing political system of Japan, with the emperor being worshipped as a living god, was obsolete, and that saving Japan from fascism would require Japan being "reconstructed as a socialist state".

Between 1933 and 1934, Sorge formed a network of informants. His agents had contacts with senior politicians and obtained information on Japanese foreign policy. His agent Ozaki developed a close contact with Prime Minister Fumimaro Konoe. Ozaki copied secret documents for Sorge.

As he appeared to be an ardent Nazi, Sorge was welcome at the German embassy. One Japanese journalist who knew Sorge described him in 1935 as "a typical, swashbuckling, arrogant Nazi... quick-tempered, hard-drinking". As the Japan correspondent for the Frankfurter Zeitung, Sorge developed a network of sources in Japanese politics, and soon German diplomats, including the ambassador Herbert von Dirksen, came to depend upon Sorge as a source of intelligence on the fractious and secretive world of Japanese politics. The Japanese values of honne and tatemae (the former literally means "true sound", roughly "as things are", and the latter literally means "façade" or roughly "as things appear"), the tendency of the Japanese to hide their real feelings and profess to believe in things that they do not, made deciphering Japan's politics difficult. Sorge's fluency in Japanese enhanced his status as a Japanologist. Sorge was interested in Asian history and culture, especially Chinese and Japanese, and when he was sober, he tried to learn as much as he could. Meanwhile, Sorge befriended General Eugen Ott, the German military attaché to Japan and seduced his wife, Helma. Ott sent reports back to Berlin containing his assessments of the Imperial Japanese Army, which Helma Ott copied and gave to Sorge, who passed them on to Moscow (Helma Ott believed Sorge to be working merely for the Nazi Party). As the Japanese Army had been trained by a German military mission in the 19th century, German influence was strong and Ott had good contacts with Japanese officers.

In October 1934, Ott and Sorge made an extended visit to the puppet "Empire of Manchukuo", which was actually a Japanese colony, and Sorge, who knew the Far East far better than Ott, wrote the report describing Manchukuo that Ott submitted to Berlin under his name. As Ott's report was received favourably at both the Bendlerstrasse and the Wilhelmstrasse, Sorge soon became one of Ott's main sources of information about the Japanese Empire, which created a close friendship between the two. In 1935, Sorge passed on to Moscow a planning document provided to him by Ozaki, which strongly suggested that Japan was not planning on attacking the Soviet Union in 1936. Sorge guessed correctly that Japan would invade China in July 1937 and that there was no danger of a Japanese invasion of Siberia.

On 26 February 1936, an attempted military coup took place in Tokyo. It was meant to achieve a mystical "Shōwa Restoration" and led to several senior officials being murdered by the rebels. Dirksen, Ott and the rest of the German embassy staff were highly confused as to why it was happening and were at a loss as to how to explain the coup to the Wilhelmstrasse. They turned to Sorge, the resident Japan expert, for help. Using notes supplied to him by Ozaki, Sorge submitted a report stating that the Imperial Way Faction in the Japanese Army, which had attempted the coup, was composed of younger officers from rural backgrounds. They were upset at the impoverishment of the countryside, and that the faction was not communist or socialist but just anti-capitalist and believed that big business had subverted the emperor's will. Sorge's report was used as the basis of Dirksen's explanation of the coup attempt, which he sent back to the Wilhelmstrasse, which was satisfied at the ambassador's "brilliant" explanation of the coup attempt.

Sorge lived in a house in a respectable neighborhood in Tokyo. In the summer of 1936, a Japanese woman, Hanako Ishii, a waitress at a bar frequented by Sorge, moved into Sorge's house to become his common-law wife. Of all of Sorge's various relationships with women, his most durable and lasting one was with Ishii. She tried to curb Sorge's heavy drinking and his habit of riding his motorcycle in a way that everyone viewed as almost suicidal. An American reporter who knew Sorge later wrote that he "created the impression of being a playboy, almost a wastrel, the very antithesis of a keen and dangerous spy".

Ironically, Sorge's spying for the Soviets in Japan in the late 1930s was probably safer for him than if he had been in Moscow. Claiming too many pressing responsibilities, he disobeyed Josef Stalin's orders to return to the Soviet Union in 1937 during the Great Purge, as he realised the risk of arrest because of his German citizenship. In fact, two of Sorge's earliest GRU handlers, Yan Karlovich Berzin and his successor, Artur Artuzov, were shot during the purges. In 1938, Joachim von Ribbentrop, the German ambassador to Britain, was promoted to foreign minister, and to replace Ribbentrop, Dirksen was sent to London. Ribbentrop promoted Ott to be Dirksen's replacement. Ott, now aware that Sorge was sleeping with his wife, let his friend Sorge have "free run of the embassy night and day", as one German diplomat later recalled: he was given his own desk at the embassy. Ott tolerated Sorge's affair with his wife on the grounds that Sorge was such a charismatic man that women always fell in love with him and so it was only natural that Sorge would sleep with his wife. Ott liked to call Sorge Richard der Unwiderstehliche ("Richard the Irresistible"), as his charm made him attractive to women. Ott greatly valued Sorge as a source of information about Japanese politics, especially Japan's war with China, since Ott found that Sorge knew so many things about Japan that no other Westerner knew that he chose to overlook Sorge's affair with his wife.

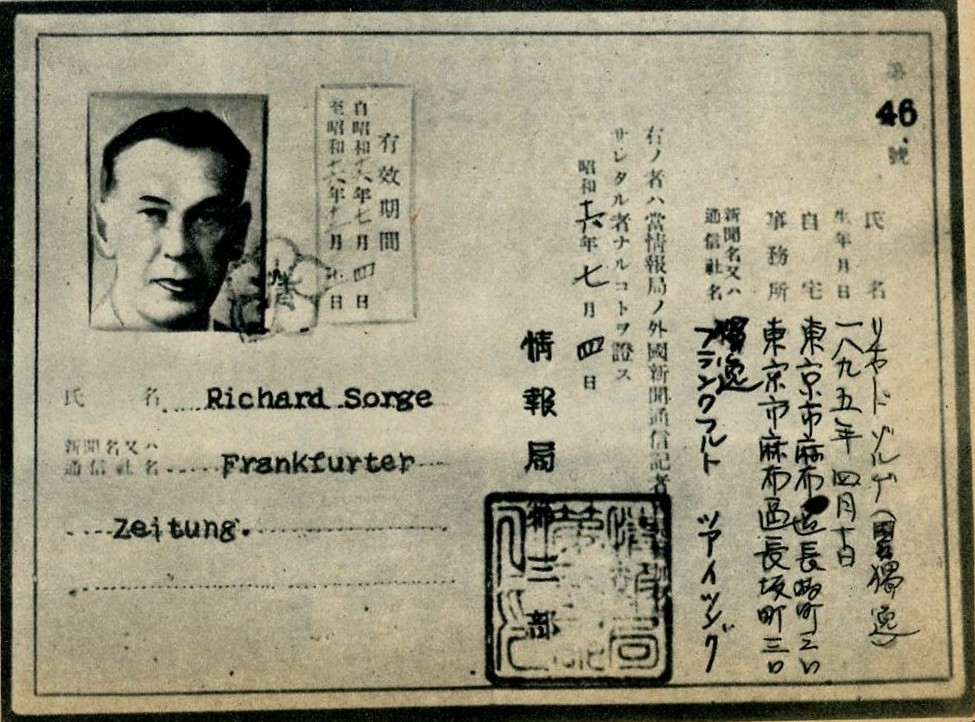
Sorge's press pass in Japan

After Ott became the ambassador to Japan in April 1938, Sorge had breakfast with him daily and they discussed German–Japanese relations in detail, and Sorge sometimes drafted the cables that Ott sent under his name to Berlin. Ott trusted Sorge so much that he sent him out as a German courier to carry secret messages to the German consulates in Canton, Hong Kong and Manila. Sorge noted about his influence in the German embassy: "They would come to me and say, 'we have found out such and such a thing, have you heard about it and what do you think'?" On 13 May 1938, while he rode his motorcycle in Tokyo, a very intoxicated Sorge crashed into a wall and was badly injured. As Sorge was carrying around notes given to him by Ozaki at the time, if the police had discovered the documents, his cover would have been blown. However, a member of his spy ring got to the hospital and removed the documents before the police arrived. In 1938, Sorge reported to Moscow that the Battle of Lake Khasan had been caused by overzealous officers in the Kwantung Army and that there were no plans in Tokyo for a general war against the Soviet Union. Unaware that his friend Berzin had been shot as a "Trotskyite" in July 1938, Sorge sent him a letter in October 1938:

Dear Comrade! Don't worry about us. Although we are terribly tired and tense, nevertheless we are disciplined, obedient, decisive and devoted fellows who are ready to carry out the tasks connected with our great mission. I send sincere greetings to you and your friends. I request you to forward the attached letter and greetings to my wife. Please, take the time to see to her welfare.

Sorge never learned that Berzin had been shot as a traitor.

The two most authoritative sources for intelligence for the Soviet Union on Germany in the late 1930s were Sorge and Rudolf von Scheliha, the First Secretary at the German embassy in Warsaw. Unlike Sorge, who believed in communism, Scheliha's reason for spying was money problems; he had a lifestyle beyond his salary as a diplomat, and he turned to selling secrets to provide additional income. Scheliha sold documents to the NKVD indicating that Germany was planning from late 1938 to turn Poland into a satellite state, and after the Poles refused to fall into line, Germany planned to invade Poland from March 1939 onward. Sorge reported that Japan did not intend for the border war with the Soviet Union that began in May 1939 to escalate into all-out war. Sorge also reported that the attempt to turn the Anti-Comintern Pact into a military alliance was floundering since the Germans wanted the alliance to be directed against Britain, while the Japanese wanted it to target the Soviets. Sorge's reports that the Japanese did not plan to invade Siberia were disbelieved in Moscow and on 1 September 1939, Sorge was attacked in a message from Moscow:

Japan must have commenced important movements (military and political) in preparation for war against the Soviet Union but you have not provided any appreciable information. Your activity seems to [be] getting slack.

=== Wartime intelligence ===
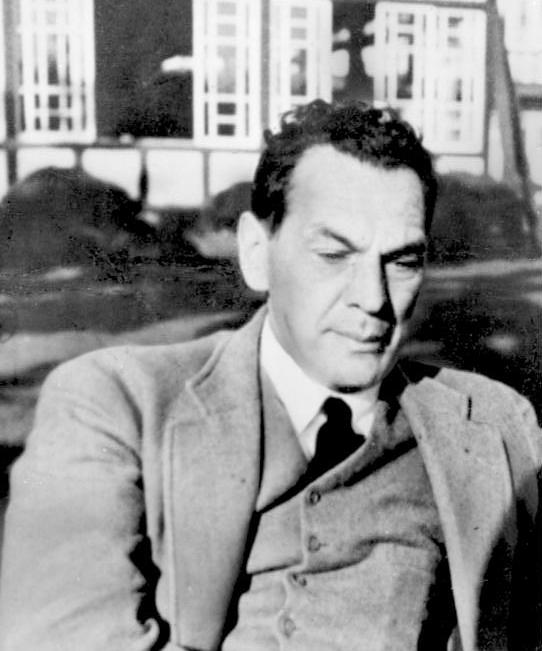
Sorge in 1940

Sorge supplied Soviet intelligence with information about the Anti-Comintern Pact and the German-Japanese Pact. In 1941, his embassy contacts made him learn of Operation Barbarossa, the imminent Axis invasion of the Soviet Union and the approximate date. On 30 May 1941, Sorge reported to Moscow, "Berlin informed Ott that German attack will commence in the latter part of June. Ott 95 percent certain war will commence". On 20 June, Sorge reported: "Ott told me that war between Germany and the USSR is inevitable.... Invest [the code name for Ozaki] told me that the Japanese General Staff is already discussing what position to take in the event of war". Moscow received the reports, but Stalin and other top Soviet leaders ultimately ignored Sorge's warnings, as well as those of other sources, including early false alarms. Other Soviet agents who also reported an imminent German invasion were also regarded with suspicion by Stalin.

It has been rumoured that Sorge provided the exact date of "Barbarossa", but the historian Gordon Prange in 1984 concluded that the closest Sorge came was 20 June and that Sorge himself never claimed to have discovered the correct date (22 June) in advance. The date of 20 June was given to Sorge by Oberstleutnant (Lieutenant-Colonel) Erwin Scholl, the deputy military attaché at the German embassy. On a dispatch he sent the GRU on 1 June, which read, "Expected start of German-Soviet war around June 15 is based on information Lt. Colonel Scholl brought with him from Berlin... for Ambassador Ott". Despite knowing that Germany was going to invade the Soviet Union sometime in May or June, Sorge was still shocked on 22 June when he learned of Operation Barbarossa. He went to a bar to get drunk and repeated in English: "Hitler's a fucking criminal! A murderer. But Stalin will teach the bastard a lesson. You just wait and see!" The Soviet press reported in 1964 that on 15 June, Sorge had sent a radio dispatch saying, "The war will begin on June 22". Prange, who despite not having access to material released by the Russian authorities in the 1990s, did not accept the veracity of that report. Stalin was quoted as having ridiculed Sorge and his intelligence before "Barbarossa":

There's this bastard who's set up factories and brothels in Japan and even deigned to report the date of the German attack as 22 June. Are you suggesting I should believe him too?

In late June, Sorge informed Moscow that Ozaki had learned the Japanese cabinet had decided to occupy the southern half of French Indochina (now Vietnam) and that invading the Soviet Union was being considered as an option, but for the moment, Japanese Prime Minister Konoe had decided on neutrality. On 2 July, an Imperial Conference attended by the emperor, Konoe and the senior military leaders approved occupying all of French Indochina and to reinforce the Kwantung Army for a possible invasion of the Soviet Union. At the bottom of the report, the Deputy Head of Soviet Army General Staff Intelligence wrote, "In consideration of the high reliability and accuracy of previous information and the competence of the information sources, this information can be trusted". In July 1941, Sorge reported that German Foreign Minister Joachim von Ribbentrop had ordered Ott to start pressuring the Japanese to attack the Soviet Union but that the Japanese were resisting. On 25 August, Sorge reported to Moscow: "Invest [Ozaki] was able to learn from circles closest to Konoye... that the High Command... discussed whether they should go to war with the USSR. They decided not to launch the war within this year, repeat, not to launch the war this year". On 6 September, an imperial conference decided against war with the Soviet Union and ordered the start of preparations for a possible war against the United States and the British Empire, which Ozaki reported to Sorge. At the same time, Ott told Sorge that all of his efforts to get Japan to attack the Soviet Union had failed. On 14 September, Sorge reported to Moscow, "In the careful judgment of all of us here... the possibility of [Japan] launching an attack, which existed until recently, has disappeared...." Sorge advised the Red Army on 14 September that Japan would not attack the Soviet Union until:

1. Moscow had been captured.
2. The Kwantung Army had become three times the size of Soviet Far Eastern forces.
3. A civil war had started in Siberia.

This information made possible the transfer of Soviet divisions from the Far East, although the presence of the Kwantung Army in Manchuria necessitated the Soviet Union's keeping a large number of troops on the eastern borders...

Various writers have speculated that the information allowed the release of Siberian divisions for the Battle of Moscow, where the German Army suffered its first strategic defeat in the war. To that end, Sorge's information might have been the most important military intelligence work in World War II. However, Sorge was not the only source of Soviet intelligence about Japan, as Soviet codebreakers had broken the Japanese diplomatic codes and so Moscow knew from signals intelligence that there would be no Japanese attack on the Soviet Union in 1941.

Another important item allegedly reported by Sorge may have affected the Battle of Stalingrad. Sorge reported that Japan would attack the Soviet Union from the east as soon as the German army captured any city on the Volga.

Sorge's rival and opponent in Japan and East Asia was Ivar Lissner, an agent of the German Abwehr.

== Arrests and trials ==
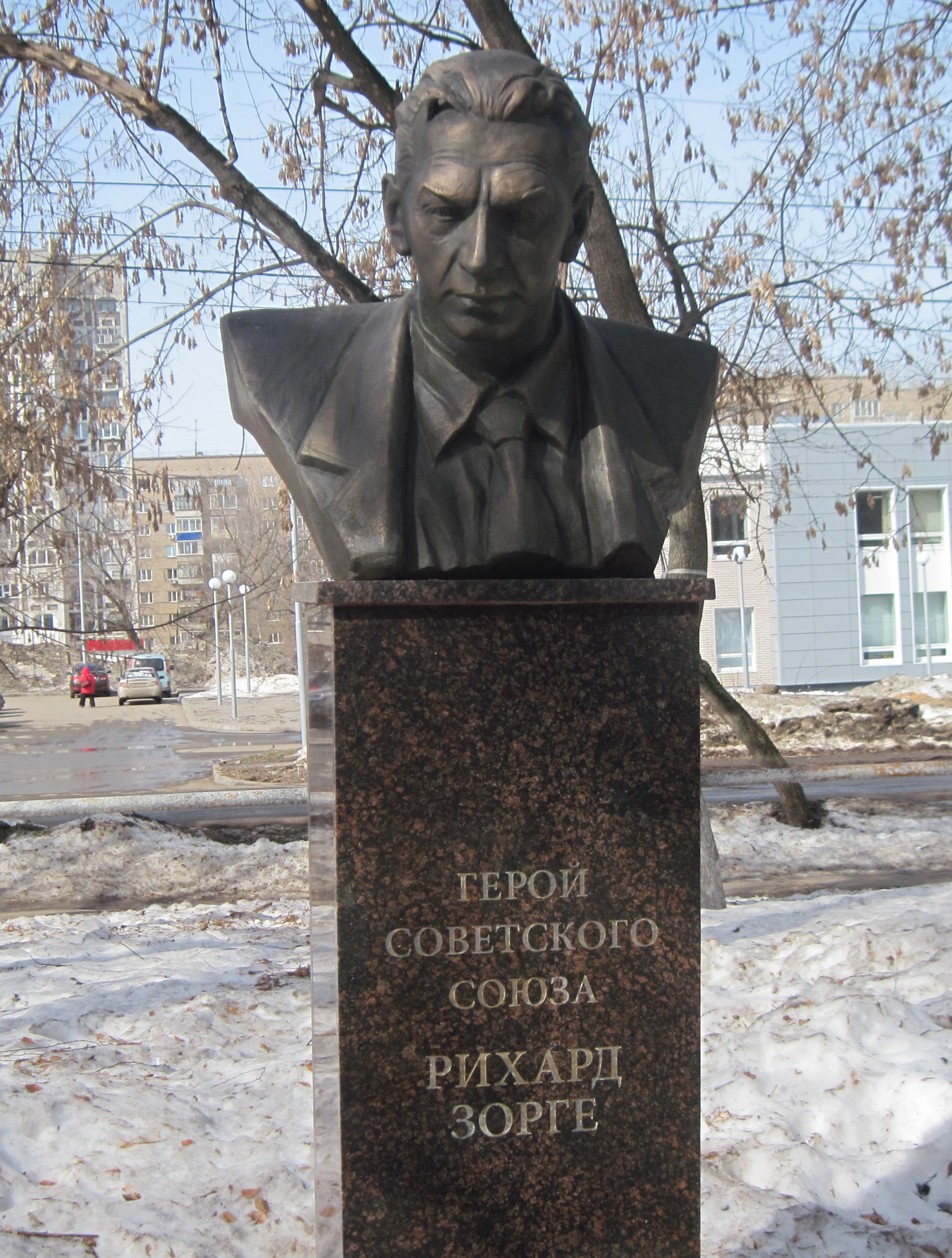
Monument to Richard Sorge in the city of Izhevsk

As the war progressed, Sorge was in increasing danger but continued his service. His radio messages were enciphered with unbreakable one-time pads, which were always used by the Soviet intelligence agencies and appeared as gibberish. However, the increasing number of the mystery messages made the Japanese begin to suspect that an intelligence ring was operating.

Sorge was also coming under increasing suspicion in Berlin. By 1941, the Nazis had instructed SS Standartenführer Josef Albert Meisinger, the "Butcher of Warsaw", who was by then the Gestapo resident at the German embassy in Tokyo, to begin monitoring Sorge and his activities. Sorge was able, through one of his lovers, Margarete Harich-Schneider, a German musician living in Japan, to gain the key to Meisinger's apartment since it had once been her apartment. Much to his relief, he learned that Meisinger had concluded that the allegations that Sorge was a Soviet agent were groundless, and Sorge's loyalty was to Germany. Sorge befriended Meisinger by playing on his principal weakness, alcohol, and spent much time getting him drunk, which contributed to Meisinger's favourable evaluation of Sorge. Meisinger reported to Berlin that the friendship between Ott and Sorge "was now so close that all normal reports from attachés to Berlin became mere appendages to the overall report written by Sorge and signed by the Ambassador".

The Kempeitai, the Japanese secret police, intercepted many messages and began to close in against the German Soviet agent. Sorge's penultimate message to Moscow in October 1941 reported, "The Soviet Far East can be considered safe from Japanese attack". In his last message to Moscow, Sorge asked to be recalled to Germany, as there was no danger of a Japanese attack on the Soviet Union, and he wished to aid the Soviet war effort by providing more intelligence about the German war effort. Ozaki was arrested on 14 October 1941 and immediately interrogated. As the Kempeitai trailed Sorge, it discovered that Ott's wife was a regular visitor to Sorge's house and that he had spent his last night as a free man sleeping with her.

Sorge was arrested shortly thereafter, on 18 October 1941, in Tokyo. The next day, a brief Japanese memo notified Ott that Sorge had been swiftly arrested "on suspicion of espionage", together with Max Clausen. Ott was both surprised and outraged as a result and assumed that it was a case of "Japanese espionage hysteria". He thought that Sorge had been discovered to have passed secret information on the Japan-American negotiations to the German embassy and also that the arrest could have been caused by anti-German elements within the Japanese government. Nonetheless, he immediately agreed with Japanese authorities to "investigate the incident fully". It was not until a few months later that Japanese authorities announced that Sorge had actually been indicted as a Soviet agent.

He was incarcerated in Sugamo Prison. Initially, the Japanese believed, because of his Nazi Party membership and German ties, that Sorge was an Abwehr agent. However, the Abwehr denied it. Under torture, Sorge confessed, but the Soviet Union denied he was a Soviet agent. The Japanese made three overtures to the Soviet Union and offered to trade Sorge for one of their own spies. However, the Soviet Union declined all of the Japanese attempts and maintained that Sorge was unknown to them. In September 1942, Sorge's wife, Katya Maximova, was arrested by the NKVD on the charges that she was a "German spy" since she was married to the German citizen Sorge (the fact that Sorge was a GRU agent did not matter to the NKVD), and she was deported to the Gulag, where she died in 1943. Hanako Ishii, the Japanese woman who loved Sorge and the only woman whom Sorge loved in return, was the only person who tried to visit Sorge during his time in Sugamo Prison. During one of her visits, she expressed concern that Sorge, under torture by the Kempeitai, would name her as being involved in his spy ring, but he promised her that he would never mention her name. The Kempeitai was much feared in Japan for its use of torture as an investigation method. Sorge ultimately struck a deal with the Kempeitai that if it spared Ishii and the wives of the other members of the spy ring, he would reveal all. Ishii was never arrested by the Kempeitai. Sorge told his captors:

That I successfully approached the German embassy in Japan and won the absolute trust by people there was the foundation of my organisation in Japan.... Even in Moscow that fact that I infiltrated into the centre of the embassy and made use of it for my spying activity is evaluated as extremely amazing, having no equivalent in history.

After Sorge's arrest, Meisinger used the increased spy fear of the Japanese to fraudulently denounce "anti-Nazis" as "Soviet spies" to the Japanese authorities. He was responsible for the persecution, internment and torture of the "Schindler" of Tokyo, Willy Rudolf Foerster. Foerster was forced to sell his company, which had employed a sizable number of Jewish refugees from Germany and the countries occupied by Germany. He and his Japanese wife survived, but after the war, the same former German diplomats, who had denounced and persecuted him as an "anti-Nazi", would discredit him.

== Death ==
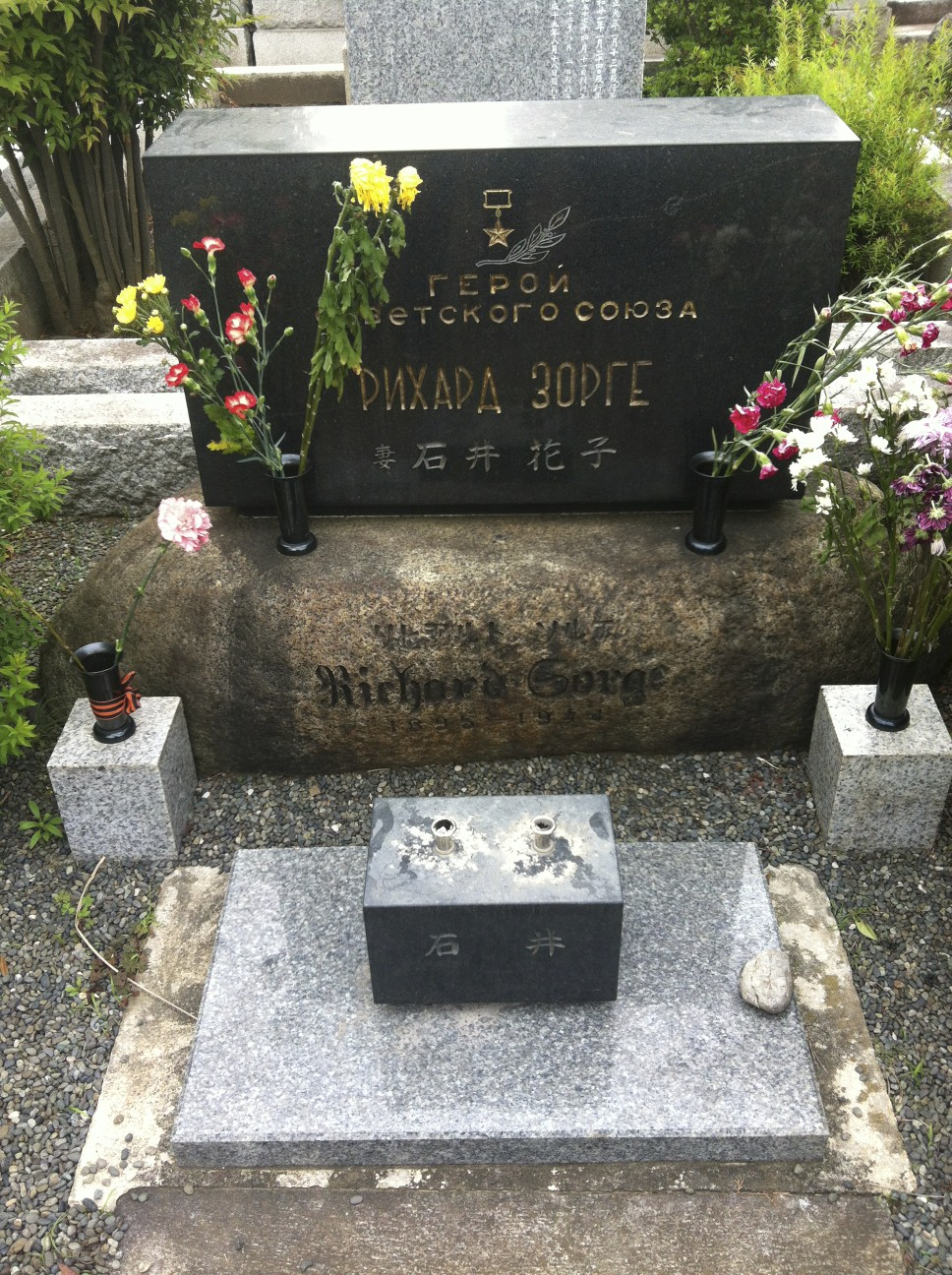
The grave of Richard Sorge and Hanako Ishii at Tama Cemetery in Fuchū, Tokyo

Sorge was hanged on 7 November 1944, at 10:20 Tokyo time in Sugamo Prison and was pronounced dead 19 minutes later. Hotsumi Ozaki had been hanged earlier in the same day. Sorge's body was not cremated because of wartime fuel shortages. He was buried in a mass grave for Sugamo Prison inmates in the nearby Zoshigaya Cemetery.

Sorge was survived by his mother, then living in Germany, and he left his estate to Anna Clausen, the wife of his radio operator, Max Christiansen-Clausen.

Under pressure from the American occupation authorities, Sorge's Japanese lover, Hanako Ishii (石井 花子 Ishii Hanako, 1911 – 1 July 2000), located and recovered his skeleton on 16 November 1949. After identifying him by his distinctive dental work and a poorly-set broken leg, she took his body away and had him cremated at the Shimo-Ochiai Cremation Centre. She kept his own teeth, belt and spectacles and had made a ring of his gold bridgework, which she wore for the rest of her life. After her death, her own ashes were interred beside his. A white memorial stone at the site bears an epitaph in Japanese, the first two lines read: "Here lies a hero who sacrificed his life fighting against war and for world peace".

The Soviet Union did not officially acknowledge Sorge until 1964.

It was argued that Sorge's biggest coup led to his undoing because Stalin could not afford to let it become known that he had rejected Sorge's warning about the German attack in June 1941. However, nations seldom officially recognise their own undercover agents.

== Legacy ==
=== Posthumous recognition ===
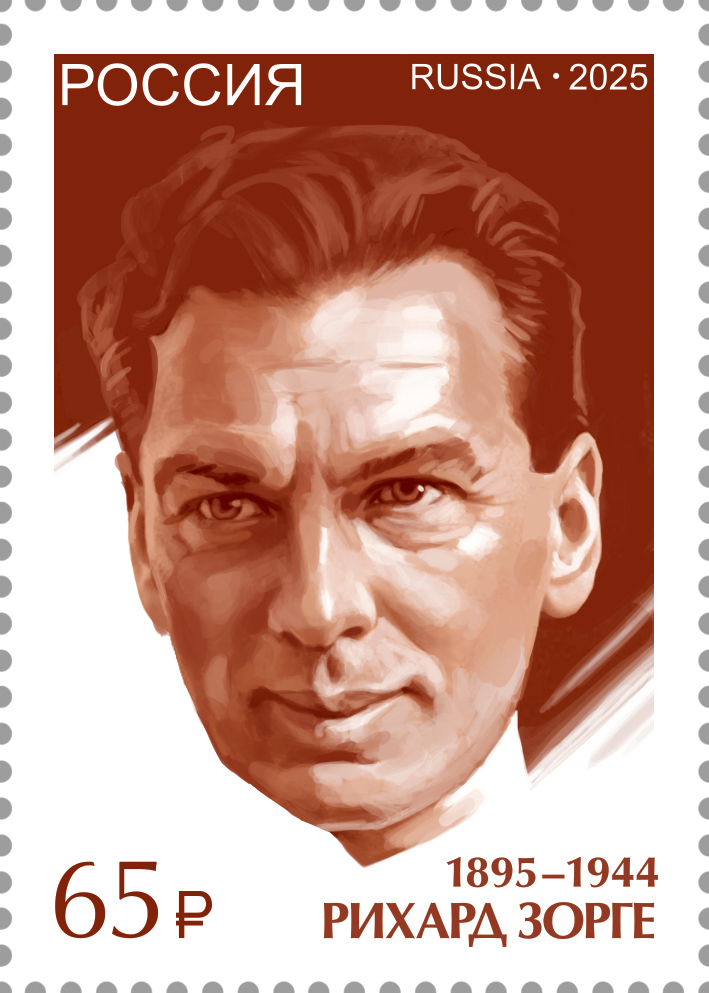
Sorge on a 2025 stamp of Russia

Sorge was unknown to the world until 1952, when U.S General Charles A. Willoughby published his book The Shanghai Conspiracy claiming that the Sorge spy ring was still in existence, had caused the "loss of China" in 1949 and was in the process of taking over the U.S. government. The book was endorsed by Senator Joseph McCarthy and by many members of the House Committee on Un-American Activities. The American Japanologist Michael Schaller wrote that Willoughby was indeed correct that Sorge was a Soviet spy and that certain left-wing American journalists who worked with Sorge in Shanghai in the early 1930s were probably also Soviet agents, but much of what Willoughby wrote reflected the paranoid mind of one of the most incompetent military intelligence officers ever in American history.

Initially, Sorge's reputation in West Germany in the 1950s was highly negative, with Sorge depicted as a traitor working for the Soviet Union who was responsible for the deaths of hundreds of thousands of Wehrmacht soldiers in the winter of 1941–1942. The 1950s were a transition moment in the German memory of Nazi Germany, as its German supporters sought a version of history that presented them as victims, rather than as followers, of Hitler. They portrayed Nazism as an aberration in German history that had no connections to traditional Prussian virtues, falsely portrayed the Wehrmacht as an honourable fighting force that had nothing to do with the Holocaust, and presented the Soviets as guilty of crimes that were even more horrific than those committed by the Nazis. That way of remembering the Nazi past in the 1950s caused Operation Barbarossa and Germany's war on the Eastern Front to be seen as a heroic and legitimate war against the Soviet Union of which Germans should be unashamed.

The first tentative efforts at changing the memory of the Nazi past started in the early 1950s, when German President Theodor Heuss gave a speech on 20 July 1954 that praised the putsch attempt of 20 July 1944. He argued that "the men of July 20th" were patriots rather than traitors, which was then a bold gesture. The first effort to present Sorge in a positive light occurred in the summer of 1953, when the influential publisher Rudolf Augstein wrote a 17-part series in his magazine, Der Spiegel. He argued that Sorge was not a Soviet agent but a heroic German patriot opposed to the Nazi regime whose motivation in providing intelligence to the Soviet Union was to bring down Hitler, rather than to support Stalin. Augstein also attacked Willoughby's claims in The Shanghai Conspiracy of Sorge having caused the "loss of China" in 1949 and that the Sorge spy ring was in the process of taking over the U.S. government. Augstein argued that Willoughby and his supporters of having assumed that Sorge's espionage was directed against the U.S. as well, not just Germany and Japan.

The Kremlin gave much greater attention to signals intelligence in evaluating threats from Japan from 1931 to 1941 than it did to the intelligence that was gathered by the Sorge spy ring, but since Soviet intelligence did not like to mention the achievements of its codebreakers, Soviet propaganda from 1964 onward gloried Sorge as a "hero spy" and avoided all mention that the Soviets had broken the Japanese codes. The Soviets, during the Cold War, liked to give the impression that all of their intelligence came from human intelligence, rather than signals intelligence, to prevent Western nations from knowing how much the Soviets collected from the latter source. A testament to Sorge's fame in the Soviet Union was that even though Sorge worked for the GRU, not the NKVD, it was the KGB, which had far more power than the Red Army, that claimed him as one of its "hero spies" in the 1960s.

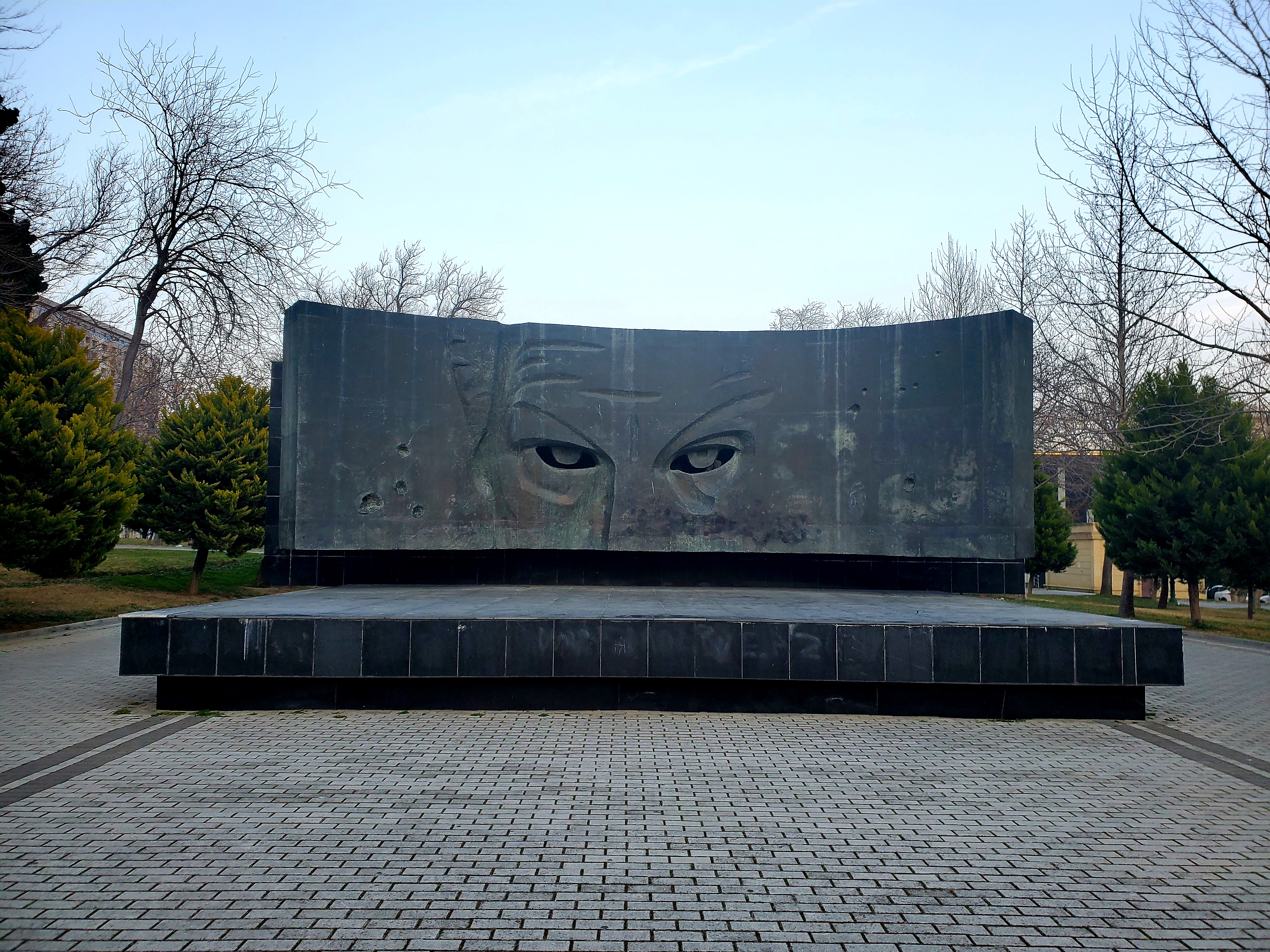
Monument to Richard Sorge in Baku

In November 1964, twenty years after his death, the Soviet government awarded Sorge the title of Hero of the Soviet Union. Sorge's widow, Hanako Ishii, received a Soviet and Russian pension until her death in July 2000 in Tokyo. In the 1960s, the KGB, seeking to improve its image in the Soviet Union, began the cult of the "hero spy" with former Chekists working abroad being celebrated as the great "hero spies" in books, films and newspapers. Sorge was one of those selected for "hero spy" status. In fact, the Soviets had broken Japanese codes in 1941 and had already known independently of the intelligence provided by Sorge that Japan had decided to "strike south" (attacking the United States and the British Empire), instead of "striking north" (attacking the Soviet Union).

In 1965, three East German journalists published Dr Sorge funkt aus Tokyo in celebration of Sorge and his actions. Before the award, Sorge's claim that Friedrich Adolf Sorge was his grandfather was repeated in the Soviet press. In a strange Cold War oddity, the authors stirred up a free speech scandal with patriotic letters to former Nazis in West Germany, which caused the Verfassungsschutz to issue a stern warning in early 1967: "If you receive mail from a certain Julius Mader, do not reply to him and pass on the letter to the respective security authorities".

There are monuments to Sorge in various locales, such as in Azerbaijan's capital Baku.

=== Fictional depictions ===
Such was the popularity of Augstein's articles that the German author Hans Hellmut Kirst published a spy novel featuring Sorge as the hero, and Hans-Otto Meissner wrote the book Der Fall Sorge (The Sorge Case) that was a cross between a novel and a history by blending fact and fiction together with a greater emphasis on the latter. Meissner had served as third secretary at the German Embassy in Tokyo and had known Sorge. Meissner's book, which was written as a thriller that engaged in "orientalism", portrayed Japan as a strange, mysterious country in which the enigmatic and charismatic master spy Sorge operated to infiltrate both its government and the German embassy. Meissner presented Sorge as the consummate spy, a cool professional who was dressed in a rumpled trench coat and fedora and was a great womanizer, and much of the book is concerned with Sorge's various relationships.

Later on, Meissner presented Sorge as a rather megalomaniacal figure and, in the process, changed Sorge's motivation from loyalty to communism to colossal egoism. He had Sorge rant about his equal dislike for both Stalin and Hitler and had him say that he supplied only enough information to both regimes to manipulate them into destroying each other since it suited him to play one against the other. At the book's climax, Sorge agreed to work for the American Office of Strategic Services, in exchange for being settled in Hawaii, and he was in the process of learning that Japan is planning on bombing Pearl Harbor on 7 December 1941, but his love of women proved to be his undoing as the Japanese dancer Kiyomi rejected his sexual advances. Sorge finally seduced Kiyomi but lost valuable time, which allowed the Kempeitai to arrest him.

The American historian Cornelius Partsch noted some striking aspects of Meissner's book such as his complete exoneration of the Auswärtiges Amt from any involvement in the criminal aspects of the Nazi regime. Meissner had Sorge constantly breaking into offices to steal information, which he did not do, as security at the German embassy was sloppy, and Sorge was trusted as an apparently dedicated Nazi journalist and so breaking into offices would have been unnecessary. Meissner avoided any mention of SS Standartenführer Josef Albert Meisinger, the "Butcher of Warsaw" who was stationed at the German embassy as the police attaché to Japan. Partsch wrote that Meissner gave Sorge almost superhuman abilities at lockbreaking, as he broke into various offices, safes and filing cabinets with the greatest ease, but in reality, secret documents were all too often left out in the open in unlocked rooms, and Sorge was allowed to wander about the embassy without an escort. Meissner portrayed the Auswärtiges Amt in the traditional manner, as a glamorous, elitist group that operated in exotic places like Japan serving Germany, not the Nazi regime.

Kirst's book Die letzte Karte spielt der Tod was a novel that offered a considerably more realistic picture than Meissner's romanticised portrayal of Sorge. Kirst portrayed Sorge as an existential hero, a deeply traumatized veteran of World War I, whose sleep was constantly disturbed by horrific nightmares of his war service, and when he was awake, he suffered from frequent panic attacks. Kirst's book depicted Sorge as a "lonely, desperate" man, a tragic, wounded individual with a reckless streak who engaged in maniacal binge drinking, nearly suicidal motorcycle riding across the Japanese countryside, and though he wanted love, he was incapable of maintaining lasting relationships. Unlike Meissner, Kirst had Meisinger appear as one of the book's villains by portraying him as an especially loathsome and stupid SS officer, who fully deserved to be deceived by Sorge. As part of Kirst's portrayal of Sorge as a tragic man on the brink and as victim led him to portray Sorge's spying for the Soviet Union by forces beyond his control. Kirst was more forceful in his condemnation of National Socialism than Meissner as his book maintained that the regime was so monstrously evil that an existential man forever on the brink of a mental breakdown like Sorge ended up spying for the Soviet Union as the lesser evil.

Partsch noted that both books were very much concerned with Sorge's womanising, which neither author exaggerated, but presented the aspect of his personality in different ways. Kirst portrayed Sorge's womanizing as part of the same self-destructive urges that led him to spy for the Soviet Union, but Meissner depicted Sorge's womanizing as part of his callous narcissism and as his principal weakness, as his desire for Kiyomi finally destroyed him. In turn, that led to different depictions of the male body. Meissner portrayed it as the seductive instrument that entices female desire and led women into ill-advised relationships with Sorge, whose body is perfectly fit and attractive to women. Kirst, by contrast, correctly noted that Sorge walked with a pronounced limp because of a war wound, which had Sorge sarcastically say was because of his "gallantry" in his book, and Sorge's wounded body served as a metaphor for his wounded soul. Partsch further commented that Meissner's book was a depoliticised and personalised account of the Sorge spy ring, as he omitted any mention of Hotsumi Ozaki, an idealistic man who sincerely believed his country was on the wrong course, and he portrayed Sorge as a "Faustian man" motivated only by his vanity to exercise "a god-like power over the world" and gave Sorge "an overblown, pop-Nietzschean sense of destiny".

The ultimate "message" of Meissner's book was that Sorge was an amoral, egoistical individual whose actions had nothing to do with ideology and that the only reason for Germany's defeat by the Soviet Union was Sorge's spying, which suggested that Germany lost the war only because of "fate". Meissner followed the "great man" interpretation of history that a few "great men" decide the events of the world, with everyone else reduced to passive bystanders. By contrast, Kirst pictured Sorge as a victim, as a mere pawn in a "murderous chess game" and emphasised Sorge's opposition to the Nazi regime as the motivation for his actions. Kirst further noted that Sorge was betrayed by his own masters as after his arrest, and the Soviet regime denounced him as a "Trotskyite" and made no effort to save him. Partsch concluded that the two rival interpretations of Sorge put forward in the novels by Meissner and Kirst in 1955 have shaped Sorge's image in the West, especially Germany, ever since their publication.

In 1954, the West German film director Veit Harlan wrote and directed the film Verrat an Deutschland about Sorge's espionage in Japan. Harlan had been the favourite filmmaker of Nazi Information Minister Joseph Goebbels and directed many propaganda films, including Jud Süss. Harlan's film is a romantic drama, starring Harlan's wife, Kristina Söderbaum, as Sorge's love interest. The film was publicly premiered by the distributor before it passed the rating system and so was withdrawn from more public performances and finally released after some editing had been done. In 1961, a movie, Who Are You, Mr. Sorge?, was produced in France in collaboration with West Germany, Italy, and Japan. It was very popular in the Soviet Union as well. Sorge was played by Thomas Holtzmann.

In 1971, a comic book based on Sorge's life, Wywiadowca XX wieku ("20th Century Intelligence Officer"), was published in the People's Republic of Poland to familiarise younger readers with Sorge. Sorge also appears in Osamu Tezuka's Adolf manga. In his 1981 book, Their Trade is Treachery, the author Chapman Pincher asserted that Sorge, a GRU agent himself, recruited the Englishman Roger Hollis in China in the early 1930s to provide information. Hollis later returned to England, joined MI5 just before World War II began and eventually became the director-general of MI5 from 1956 to 1965. As detailed by former MI5 staffer Peter Wright in his 1988 book Spycatcher, Hollis was accused of being a Soviet agent, but despite several lengthy and seemingly thorough investigations, no conclusive proof was ever obtained.

One of Aleksandar Hemon's first stories in English is "The Sorge Spy Ring" (TriQuarterly, 1997). The 2003 Japanese film Spy Sorge, directed by Masahiro Shinoda, details his exploits in Shanghai and in Japan. In the film, he is portrayed by the Scottish actor Iain Glen. In 2016, one of Moscow's Moscow Central Circle rail stations was named after Sorge (Zorge). A Russian television series, "Richard Sorge. Master Spy", was a twelve-episode series filmed in 2019.

=== Reputation ===
Comments about Sorge by famous personalities include:

- "A devastating example of a brilliant success of espionage". – Douglas MacArthur, General of the Army
- "His work was impeccable." – Kim Philby
- "In my whole life, I have never met anyone as great as he was." – Mitsusada Yoshikawa, Chief Prosecutor in the Sorge trials who obtained Sorge's death sentence.
- "Sorge was the man whom I regard as the most formidable spy in history." – Ian Fleming
- "Richard Sorge was the best spy of all time." – Tom Clancy
- "The spy who changed the world". – Lance Morrow
- "Somehow, amidst the Bonds and Smiley's People, we have ignored the greatest of 20th century spy stories – that of Stalin's Sorge, whose exploits helped change history." – Carl Bernstein
- "Richard Sorge's brilliant espionage work saved Stalin and the Soviet Union from defeat in the fall of 1941, probably prevented a Nazi victory in World War II and thereby assured the dimensions of the world we live in today." – Larry Collins
- "The spies in history who can say from their graves, the information I supplied to my masters, for better or worse, altered the history of our planet, can be counted on the fingers of one hand. Richard Sorge was in that group." – Frederick Forsyth
- "Stalin's James Bond". – Le Figaro

== In popular culture ==
There have been several literary and dramatic representations of Sorge's life:

- The German Letzte Karte spielt der Tod by Hans Hellmut Kirst, published in English as The Last Card (New York: Pyramid Publications, Inc., 1967) and Death Plays the Last Card (London: Fontana, 1968).
- The German film Verrat an Deutschland (1955), directed by Veit Harlan and starring Paul Muller as Sorge.
- The French docu-drama Who Are You, Mr. Sorge? (1961), written by Yves Ciampi, Tsutomu Sawamura, and Hans-Otto Meissner, starring Thomas Holtzmann as Sorge.
- Wywiadowca XX wieku (20th-Century Intelligencer), a comic book that narrated Sorge's exploits, published in Poland in 1983.
- The American novel Wild Midnight Falls (Holt, Rinehart & Winston, 1968) in the Milo March series by M. E. Chaber, based on the supposition that Sorge was still alive and secretly active.
- The Russian novel Кио ку мицу! Совершенно секретно – при опасности сжечь! (Kio ku mitsu! Top secret – burn in case of danger!) by Ю. М. Корольков (Yu. M. Korol'kov) (Беларусь, 1987).
- The French L'Insensé by Morgan Sportes (Grasset, 2002) translated into Japanese as Sorge hametsu no fuga (Iwanami Shoten, 2005).
- The 1997 novel Stepper by Australian Brian Castro.
- "The Sorge Spy Ring", in the 2000 short story collection The Question of Bruno by Aleksandar Hemon.
- The later chapters of Osamu Tezuka's manga Adolf.
- The Japanese film Spy Sorge (2003), directed by Masahiro Shinoda and starring Iain Glen as Sorge.
- The book The Man with Three Faces by German Hans-Otto Meissner, who wrote it based in his experiences as a diplomat in wartime. He met Sorge on some occasions.
- The Russian television miniseries Zorge (2019)
- An Impeccable Spy, biography by Owen Matthews, 2019.

== Bibliography ==
- Allen, Thomas; Polmar, Norman (1997). The Spy Book. New York: Random House. ISBN 0-375-70249-0.
- Andrew, Christopher; Gordievsky, Oleg (1990). KGB: The Inside Story of Its Foreign Operations from Lenin to Gorbachev. New York: Harper Collins. ISBN 0060166053.
- Andrew, Christopher; Mitrokhin, Vasili (2000). The Mitrokhin Archive. London: Penguin Books. ISBN 0465003125.
- Johnson, Chalmers (1990). An Instance of Treason: Ozaki Hotsumi and the Sorge Spy Ring. Stanford University Press. ISBN 978-0-8047-1767-0.
- Bagley, Tennent (2013). Spymaster: Startling Cold War Revelations of a Soviet KGB Chief. New York: Skyhorse Publishing. ISBN 978-1-62636-065-5.
- Deakin, F. W.; Storry, G. R. (1966). The case of Richard Sorge. London: Chatto & Windus.. An early account by two leading British historians of the time. It is informed by their differing perspectives, Deakin being an authority on 20th century European history and Storry an authority on 20th century Japan.
- Hastings, Max (2015). The Secret War: Spies, Codes and Guerrillas 1939–1945 (Paperback). London: William Collins. ISBN 978-0-00-750374-2.
- Jochem, Clemens (2017). Der Fall Foerster: Die deutsch-japanische Maschinenfabrik in Tokio und das Jüdische Hilfskomitee. Berlin: Hentrich & Hentrich. ISBN 978-3-95565-225-8.
- Matthews, Owen (2020). Impeccable Spy: Richard Sorge, Stalin's Master Agent. London; New York: Bloomsbury. ISBN 978-1408857816.
- Meissner, Hans-Otto (1955). The Man with Three Faces. The True Story of a Master Spy. New York: Rinehart.; translation of Der Fall Sorge (Mǖnchen: Wilhelm Andermann 1955).
- Messana, Paola (2011). Soviet Communal Living: An Oral History of the Kommunalka. New York: Palgrave Macmillan. ISBN 978-0-230-11016-8.
- Partsch, Cornelius (Winter 2005). "The Case of Richard Sorge: Secret Operations in the German Past in 1950s Spy Fiction". Monatshefte. 97 (4): 628–653. doi:10.3368/m.XCVII.4.628. S2CID 219196501.
- Prange, Gordon W.; Goldstein, Donald M.; Dillon, Katherine V. (1984). Target Tokyo: The Story of the Sorge Spy Ring. New York: McGraw-Hill. ISBN 0-07-050677-9.
- Whymant, Robert (1996). Stalin's Spy: Richard Sorge and the Tokyo Espionage Ring. London: I.B. Tauris Publishers. ISBN 1-86064-044-3.
- Whymant, Robert (2006) [1996]. Stalin's Spy: Richard Sorge and the Tokyo Espionage Ring. New York: Palgrave MacMillan. ISBN 1-84511-310-1.
- Whymant, Robert (9 January 2007). Stalin's Spy: Richard Sorge and the Tokyo Espionage Ring. I. B. Tauris. ISBN 978-1-84511-310-0.
