= Gustav Wilhelm Richard Sorge =

German mining engineer (1852–1907)

Gustav Wilhelm Richard Sorge (6 April 1852 – 1 December 1907) was a German mining engineer.

== Life ==
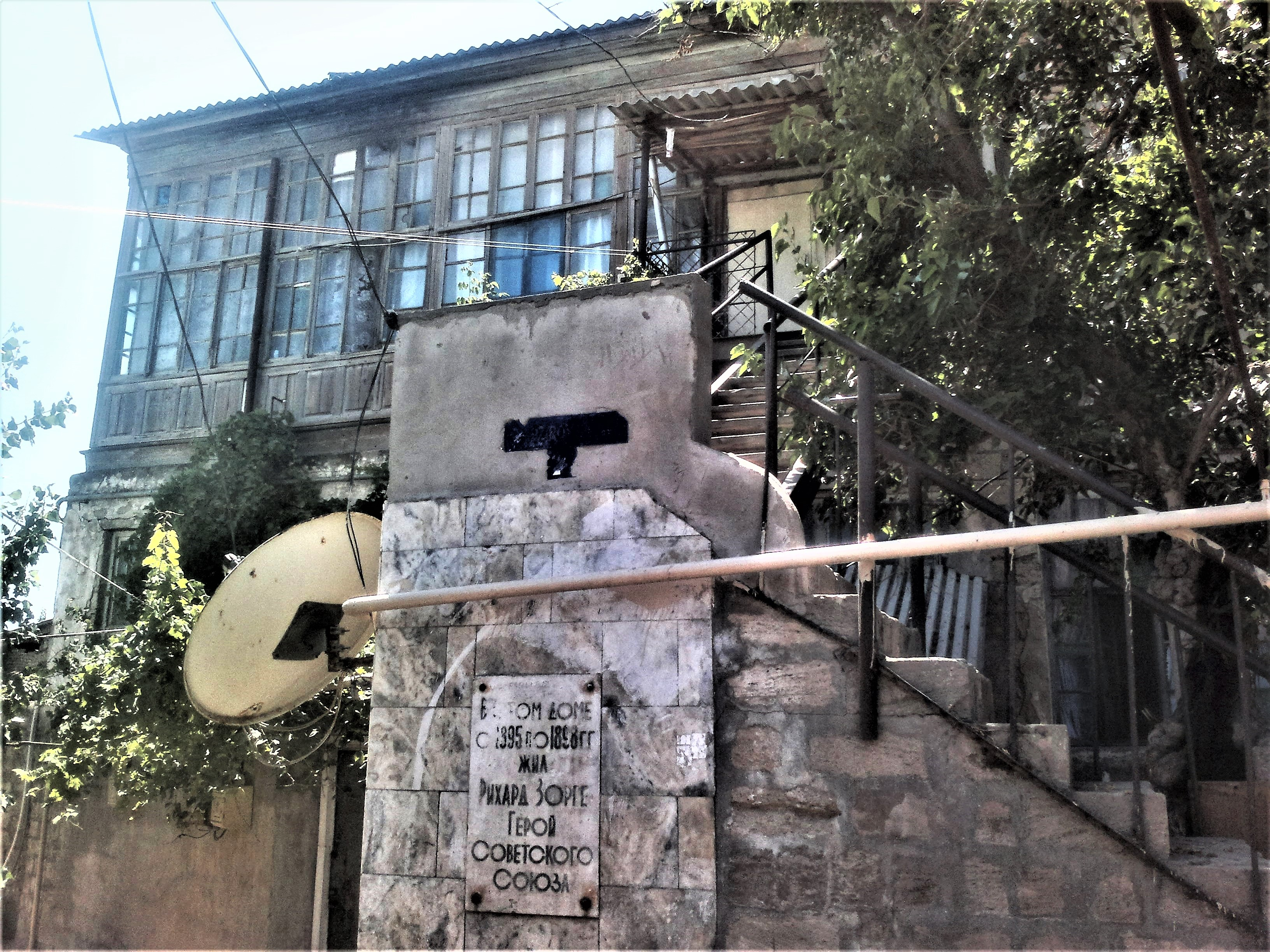
House in Sabunchi (Azerbaijan) where Gustav Wilhelm Richard Sorge and his family lived from 1895 until 1898

Sorge was the son of a surgeon who practiced in Schilda. His uncle was Friedrich Adolf Sorge. He specialized in the field of coal mining in Wettin, Saxony-Anhalt, Germany. He studied mining conditions and material handling technology.

Convinced that coal mining prospects at the Wettin Coal Mine were poor, he changed his emphasis to oil exploration, studying for several years in the United States.

From there he traveled to the oilfields near Baku in 1877 to set up a drilling technology workshop for the Otto Lenz machine factory in Sabunçu, Baku, concentrating on the field of deep drilling technology and the industrial equipment required for this purpose. In 1881 he founded his own company in his name.

He worked for Deutsche Petroleum-Aktiengesellschaft (DPAG) and the Caucasian oil company Branobel (of Robert, Ludvig and Alfred Nobel and others).

He married Nina Semyonovna Kobeleva, born in Baku on April 20, 1867, into a working-class family and became the father of the famous spy, Richard Sorge (1895–1944) along with eight other children.

After his health deteriorated and he lost his lucrative contract, the family moved to Berlin-Lankwitz in 1898. There he worked as a director for the Disconto-Gesellschaft which had founded the German-Russian Naphta Society. In 1900 he prepared a report on the Romanian oil industry.

== Works ==
- Tiefbohrtechnische Studien über Ölgruben-Betrieb und Spülbohrung. Berlin, 1908.
- The Theory of the Movement of the Flushing Streams in Bore Holes (Die Theorie der Bewegung des Spülstroms in Bohrlöchern). In: The Engineering Index Annual of the American Society of Mechanical Engineers 1969.

== See also ==
- Anton Raky (1868–1943), a pioneer in deep drilling and global oil exploration.

== Bibliography ==
- Deakin, F. W.; Storry, G. R. (1966), The case of Richard Sorge, London: Chatto & Windus. An early account by two leading British historians of the time. It is informed by their differing perspectives, Deakin being an authority on 20th century European history and Storry an authority on 20th century Japan.
- Julius Mader: Dr.-Sorge-Report. Ein Dokumentarbericht über Kundschafter des Friedens mit ausgewählten Artikeln von Richard Sorge. Militärverlag der DDR, Berlin 1986.
- Joachim Mai: Das deutsche Kapital in Russland, 1850-1894. Deutscher Verlag der Wissenschaft, Berlin 1970 (teilweise Habilitation, Universität Greifswald 1969).
- Jahrbuch für Wirtschaftsgeschichte. Akademie-Verlag, Berlin 1960.
- "Herr Sorge saß mit zu Tisch – Porträt eines Spions". Spiegel Online. Vol. 24. 1951-06-13.
- Prange, Gordon W.; Goldstein, Donald M.; Dillon, Katherine V. (1984), Target Tokyo: The Story of the Sorge Spy Ring, New York: McGraw-Hill, ISBN 0-07-050677-9
- Whymant, Robert (2007-01-09). Stalin's Spy: Richard Sorge and the Tokyo Espionage Ring. I.B.Tauris. ISBN 978-1-84511-310-0.
