= Gordon Prange =

American historian

Professor Prange teaching his history class at the University of Maryland in 1964

Gordon William Prange (/præŋ/; July 16, 1910 – May 15, 1980) was the author of several World War II historical manuscripts which were published by his co-workers after his death in 1980. Prange was a professor of history at the University of Maryland from 1937 to 1980 with a break of nine years (1942–1951) of military service in the United States Navy during World War II, and in the postwar military occupation of Japan, when he was the Chief Historian on General Douglas MacArthur's staff. It was during this time that Prange collected material from and interviewed many Japanese military officers, enlisted men, and civilians, with the information later being used in the writing of his books. Several became New York Times bestsellers, including At Dawn We Slept, The Untold Story of Pearl Harbor and Miracle at Midway.

Prange's Tora! Tora! Tora!, published in the October and November 1963 issues of Reader's Digest, and later expanded into At Dawn We Slept, portrayed the attack on Pearl Harbor, and is credited as the basis for the screenplay of the film Tora! Tora! Tora!, which was produced in 1970, while Prange took a leave of absence from the University of Maryland to serve as the technical consultant during its filming. His extensive research into the attack on Pearl Harbor was the subject of a Public Broadcasting Service television program in 2000, Prange and Pearl Harbor: A Magnificent Obsession, and was acclaimed "a definitive book on the event" by The Washington Post.

Prange was a popular lecturer at the University of Maryland. The Terrapin, the university's yearbook, said of his World War I and World War II history classes: "Students flock to his class and sit enraptured as he animates the pages of twentieth century European history through his goosesteps, 'Sieg Heils', 'Achtungs', machine gun retorts and frantic gestures".

== Personal life ==
Gordon William Prange was born on July 16, 1910, in Pomeroy, Iowa. His parents were Al, a blacksmith and his wife Johanna. He had one older brother Russell. He attended Pomeroy High School, where he excelled in baseball and track athletics. He was also known as the class clown. He graduated from Pomeroy in 1928 and enrolled at the University of Iowa intending to become a coach, but switched to history. He obtained his bachelor's degree, his master's degree in 1934, and doctorate in 1937. He studied at the University of Berlin in 1935 to 1936, during which he said: "I saw Hitler operate firsthand and heard him speak a number of times."

=== Family ===
In 1937 he married Anne Root, a professor's daughter from Iowa City. They had two daughters and a son. They moved to Maryland, where Prange took employment as a history instructor at the University of Maryland.

=== Death ===
Prange died on May 15, 1980, in Baltimore, Maryland, from cancer, aged 69. 'Prange Park' in Pomeroy is named after him.

== See also ==
- Attack on Pearl Harbor
- Events leading up to the attack on Pearl Harbor
- Pearl Harbor advance-knowledge conspiracy theory

== Selected bibliography ==
- Gordon W. Prange (1963), Tora! Tora! Tora!, in Reader's Digest, November and December issues.

All below by Gordon W. Prange, with Donald M. Goldstein and Katherine V. Dillon:

- At Dawn We Slept: The Untold Story of Pearl Harbor (1981), ISBN 0-07-050669-8
- Miracle at Midway (1982), ISBN 0-07-050672-8
- Target Tokyo: The Story of the Sorge Spy Ring (1984), ISBN 0-07-050677-9 in which the authors detail the undercover operations of the spy ring headed by Richard Sorge and Hotsumi Ozaki that conveyed highly-secret information from Tokyo to the Soviet Union between 1933 and 1941
- Pearl Harbor: The Verdict of History (1986), ISBN 0-07-050668-X
- December 7, 1941: The Day the Japanese Attacked Pearl Harbor (1988), ISBN 0-07-050682-5
- God's Samurai: Lead Pilot at Pearl Harbor (1990), ISBN 0-08-037440-9
