= Kurt Albert Gerlach =

German sociologist (1886–1922)

Kurt Albert Gerlach (22 August 1886, Hanover – 19 October 1922, Frankfurt) was a German professor and sociologist.

== Life ==
Gerlach was the son of the chemist and later director of the Continental AG Albert Gerlach and his wife Martha Friedmann. He had studied at the university of Kiel under Ferdinand Tönnies and received his doctorate in 1911 with a work on the role of Denmark in global economy. He then studied at the University of Leipzig. In 1911 and 1912 he went to England and studied at the London School of Economics (LSE) and became a member of the Fabian Society. In 1913 he habilitated in Leipzig with a treaty on protective measures for female factory workers in England. The lecture was on syndicalism.

He joined the institute for world economy and sea-trade in Kiel, directed by Bernhard Harms. From 1919 on, Gerlach taught economy at the Aachen Polytechnic. In 1922, Gerlach was accepted as the future director of the Frankfurt Institute for Social Research (Institut für Sozialforschung) in Frankfurt by the Prussian ministry of education and he taught economy and sociology at Frankfurt University. He had already designed the agenda of the institute, but because of his untimely death from diabetes in 1922, Carl Grünberg became the founding director in his stead, followed by Max Horkheimer in 1930.

Gerlach had been close to adherents of a moderate socialism from above, coupled with social reforms (Kathedersozialisten), but became a member of the SPD in November 1914 and changed to the more radical USPD in the autumn of 1919. Later on, he sympathised with Anarcho-Syndicalism and became a Marxist.

He divorced his wife Christine Gerlach so that she could marry in May 1921 her dashing lover and former pupil of Kurt Albert Gerlach, Richard Sorge. Her marriage to Sorge only lasted a few years.

== Works ==
- Dänemarks Stellung in der Weltwirtschaft. Unter besonderer Berücksichtigung der Handelsbezichung en zu Deutschland, Englannnd und Skandinavien. Schriften des Instituts für Seeverkehr und Weltwirtschaft an der Universität Kiel 3 (Jena 1911).
- Die Bedeutung des Arbeiterinnenschutzes. Habilitationsschrift. Leipzig Theorie und Praxis des Syndikalismus (München/Leipzig 1913).
- Syndikalismus in England. Der Staatsbürger, 4, 1, 1913.
- Die Frau und das Genossenschaftswesen (Jena 1918).
- Allgemeine Gutachten IV. In: Ignaz Jastrow (ed.), Die Reform der staatswissenschaftlichen Studien. Fünfzig Gutachten. (München/Leipzig, Verein für Sozialpolitik 1920), 75-95.
