= Thomas Holtzmann =

German actor (1927–2013)

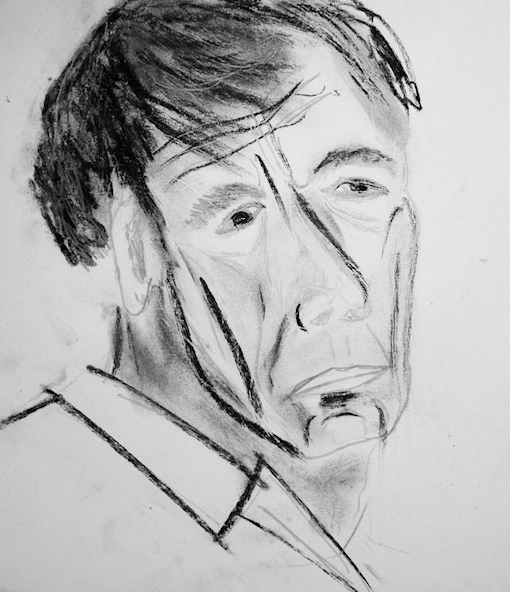
- Born: 1 April 1927; Munich, Germany
- Died: 4 January 2013 (aged 85); Munich, Germany
- Occupation: Actor
- Years active: 1955–2004

Thomas Holtzmann (1 April 1927 – 4 January 2013) was a German stage and film actor. He appeared in more than forty films from 1955 to 2004.

== Filmography ==
Year	Title	Role	Notes
1955	Beloved Enemy	Sergeant Charly Brown	
1959	For Love and Others	wachtmeister Hirschfeld	
1961	Who Are You, Mr. Sorge?	Richard Sorge	
1962	The Trial	Bert the law student	
1966	Funeral in Berlin	Reinhardt	
1969	Man on Horseback	Martin Luther	
1990	Café Europa	Dr. Hoefgen	
1991	Success	Dr. Franz Flaucher	
1992	Schtonk!	Notary Cornelius	
1995	Hades		
1998	Neue Freiheit - Keine Jobs Schönes München: Stillstand	1. Offizier	
1999	Annaluise & Anton	Man in the pawnshop	
2000	Das Phantom	Hans	TV movie
