= Robert Whymant =

British writer and reporter (1944–2004)

Robert Whymant (29 November 1944 – 26 December 2004) was a British writer and reporter. During his time as reporter he worked for The Guardian, The Times and The Daily Telegraph.

== Biography ==
Whymant was born in Luton. Later he went to Cambridge University, where he studied oriental languages. He later moved to Japan and in 1972 he started to write for the major newspapers. He also wrote for newspapers in Australia and lectured at Waseda University in Tokyo.

In 1996 Whymant wrote a book about German spy Richard Sorge, Stalin’s Spy: Richard Sorge and the Tokyo Ring. He spent 20 years researching Sorge before he wrote the book.

== Death ==
Whymant drowned while on holiday in Sri Lanka after being washed away by the tsunami on 26 December 2004, aged 60.
