= Heaven on One's Head =

1965 film

- French: Le Ciel sur la tête
- Directed by: Yves Ciampi
- Written by: Jean Chapot; Alain Satou; Yves Ciampi
- Produced by: Irénée Leriche
- Starring: André Smagghe
- Cinematography: Edmond Séchan; Guy Tabary
- Edited by: Georges Alépée
- Music by: Jacques Loussier
- Distributed by: Gaumont Distribution
- Release date: 20 January 1965
- Running time: 107 minutes
- Country: France
- Language: French

Heaven on One's Head (French: Le Ciel sur la tête, released in the United States as Skies Above) is a 1965 French science fiction film directed by Yves Ciampi. It was entered into the 4th Moscow International Film Festival where it won a Golden Prize.

== Cast ==
- André Smagghe as Gaillac
- Marcel Bozzuffi as Captain
- Henri Piégay as Majo
- Bernard Fresson as Laurent
- Jacques Monod as Commandant Ravesne
- Yves Brainville as Bricourt
- Guy Tréjan as Le ministre
- Jean Dasté as M. Bazin
- Beatrice Cenci as L'amie de Majo
- Yvonne Monlaur as Françoise
- Roger Van Mullem as L'amiral
- Wladimir Bellin as Le commandant du sous-marin
- Jacques Santi as Jolivet
