= Max Christiansen-Clausen =

German spy for the Soviet Union (1899–1979)

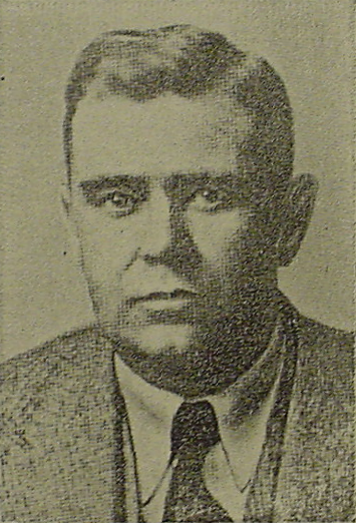

Max Christiansen-Clausen (27 February 1899 – 15 September 1979) was German radio operator best known for working as an agent of the Soviet GRU as part of Richard Sorge's group in Japan.

== Biography ==
The son of a religious stonemason with close ties to the Church, Max Clausen grew up in North Frisia on the island of Nordstrand. After finishing school in 1914, he wanted to study to become a mechanic, but could not afford the tuition and was forced to work as a hired laborer on a farm. In 1917, he was drafted into the army and served in the communications unit in Neustrelit, where he acquired skills as an electrical engineer. Later, he worked on the construction of radio masts in various cities in Germany and became close to social democrats, who influenced him.

Clausen trained as a signalman and was sent to the front in France. During a German artillery barrage of gas grenades, Clausen inhaled gas when the wind changed direction. Returning with his unit to Koblenz and being refused demobilization, he deserted the army and was arrested. Clausen later submitted a report for dismissal due to his father's illness.

Clausen's father died in 1919, his mother had died in 1902, and his brother was killed at the front a week before the end of the war. He worked as a sailor in Hamburg and visited many ports in Europe, North Africa, and Asia. In 1922, he joined the Red Trade Unions. In Stettin in July 1922, he took part in a sailors' strike and was sentenced to three months in prison. Having lost his job on the ship, he got a job as a propagandist and trade union agitator in the German Sailors' Union under the Communist Party of Germany. In 1924, he visited Murmansk and Petrograd on a sailing ship. The following year, Clausen joined the Red Front and Red Aid of Germany. In 1927, Clausen joined the KPD.

In September 1928, Clausen received an invitation to Moscow, where he was supposed to report to the GRU to the head of the intelligence department, Yan Berzin. In the GRU, Clausen received a new name, Max Schenk, and learned to work with a radio. With his first assignment, Clausen went to Shanghai under the command of Anatoly Gurevich and worked with him as a signalman. In 1929, Gurevich was replaced by Richard Sorge, who sent Clausen as his representative to Guangzhou.

In Shanghai, Max Clausen met his peer Anna Wallenius, née Zhdankova, a native of Novonikolaevsk, who had become a Finnish citizen through her marriage to a Finnish businessman. Anna Wallenius later married Max Clausen. They left for Guangzhou together, and then worked in Mukden, where the headquarters of the Japanese army was located. In August 1933, Clausen returned to Moscow, where he was sent to the new radio operator school on the Lenin Hills, then went on assignment to Odessa and in 1934 to Krasny Kut in the Volga German Republic. In the summer of 1935, Max and Anna were sent to Tokyo to see Richard Sorge. They were tasked with preventing a military conflict between the USSR and Japan. Direct leadership was entrusted to L. A. Borovich.

Klausen made the radio equipment for agent communications himself at the place of work, so as not to take risks on the road. He built the transmitters using the simplest schemes, their individual parts were stored separately among household junk and were assembled together only for the duration of the session. Radio communication was conducted in amateur ranges, and for the purpose of disguising the encryption from Tokyo they were flavored with harmless phrases in ordinary radio jargon.

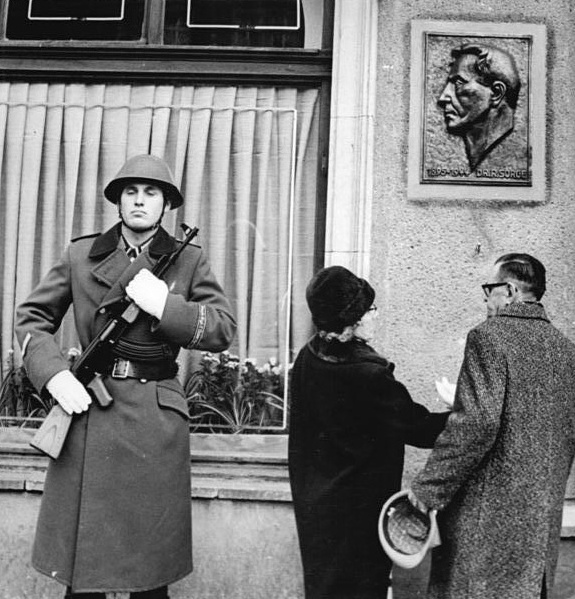
Max Christiansen-Clausen and Anna Clausen unveil a memorial plaque for Richard Sorge in Richard-Sorge-Straße, 1969

On October 18, 1941, he and Sorge's associates were arrested and sentenced to life imprisonment on January 29, 1943. His wife received seven years in prison. Clausen was released by the Americans in September 1945 after the capitulation of Japan, and the couple left Japan in 1946. They flew to Vladivostok via the Soviet embassy, where they were treated for four weeks.

Before leaving for the Soviet occupation zone, he was given a new identity under the name Christiansen. After moving to Wildau, he became a member of the Socialist Unity Party and joined the FDGB. He took a job in the human resources department of a shipyard in Berlin. Over the next 13 years, he worked in various large Berlin companies.

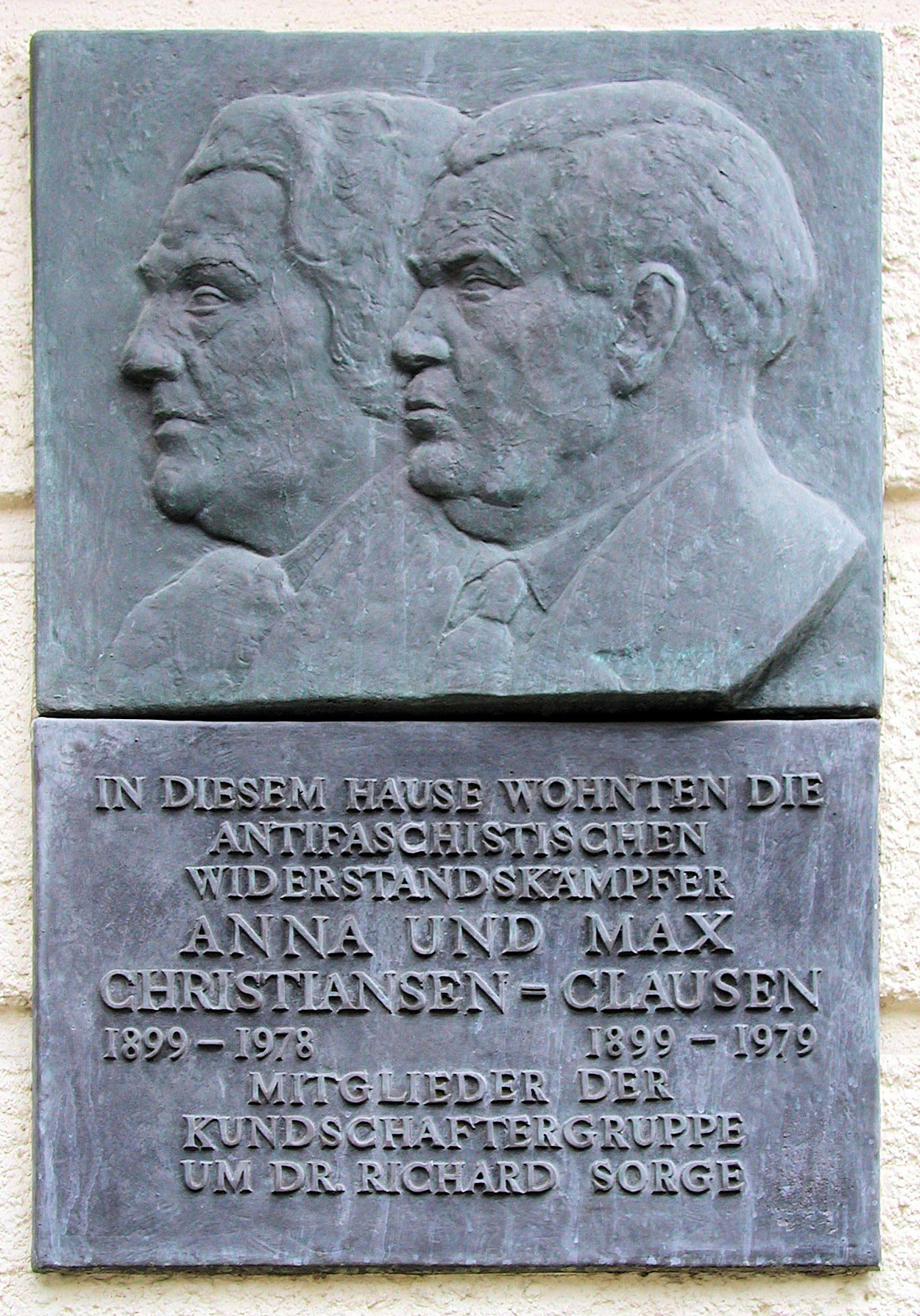
Memorial plaque of Anna and Max Christiansen-Clausen at the Richard-Sorge-Straße

His urn was buried in the “Pergolenweg” grave complex of the Friedrichsfelde Central Cemetery alongside his wife in Berlin-Lichtenberg.
