= Richard Storry =

British Japanologist (1913 – 1982)

(George) Richard Storry (20 October 1913 – 19 February 1982) was a British Japanologist.

Storry was born in Doncaster, son of Frank Spencer Storry, manager of the London Joint Stock Bank on Doncaster High Street, and Kate, née Roberts. He was educated at Repton School and Merton College, Oxford. In 1937, upon the advice of one of his tutors at Oxford, Edmund Blunden, Storry was appointed lecturer in English at Otaru Higher Commercial School in Hokkaido, Japan, a post he held until 1940. During the Second World War he served in the Intelligence Corps in the Middle East, Singapore, India and Burma. He commanded a mobile section of the South East Asia Translation and Interrogation Centre during the 1944 Battle of Imphal.

During 1947–1955 he studied at the Australian National University as Research Scholar and later as a Fellow. He was then elected to a Roger Heyworth Memorial Research Fellowship at St Antony's College, Oxford. In 1970 he was appointed Director of St Anthony's College's Far East Centre, where his work on Japanese studies laid the ground for a benefaction from Nissan of a Nissan Institute to the college, which opened in 1981. In 1981 the college awarded him an ad hominem Professorship in Japanese Studies and he was also a recipient of the Japan Foundation Award. He died in Woodeaton near Oxford aged 68 as the result of a heart attack.

He was best known for his A History of Modern Japan, which was first published in 1960.

== Works ==
- The Double Patriots: A Study of Japanese Nationalism (London: Chatto & Windus, 1957).
- A History of Modern Japan (London: Pelican Books, 1960). Reprinted with revisions in 1961, 1968, 1972, 1976 and 1982.
- The Case of Richard Sorge, co-authored with Sir William Deakin (London: Chatto & Windus, 1966).
- The Way of the Samurai (Orbis, 1978).
- Japan and the Decline of the West in Asia, 1894–1943 (London: Macmillan, 1979).
