= Yotoku Miyagi =

Okinawan artist and communist

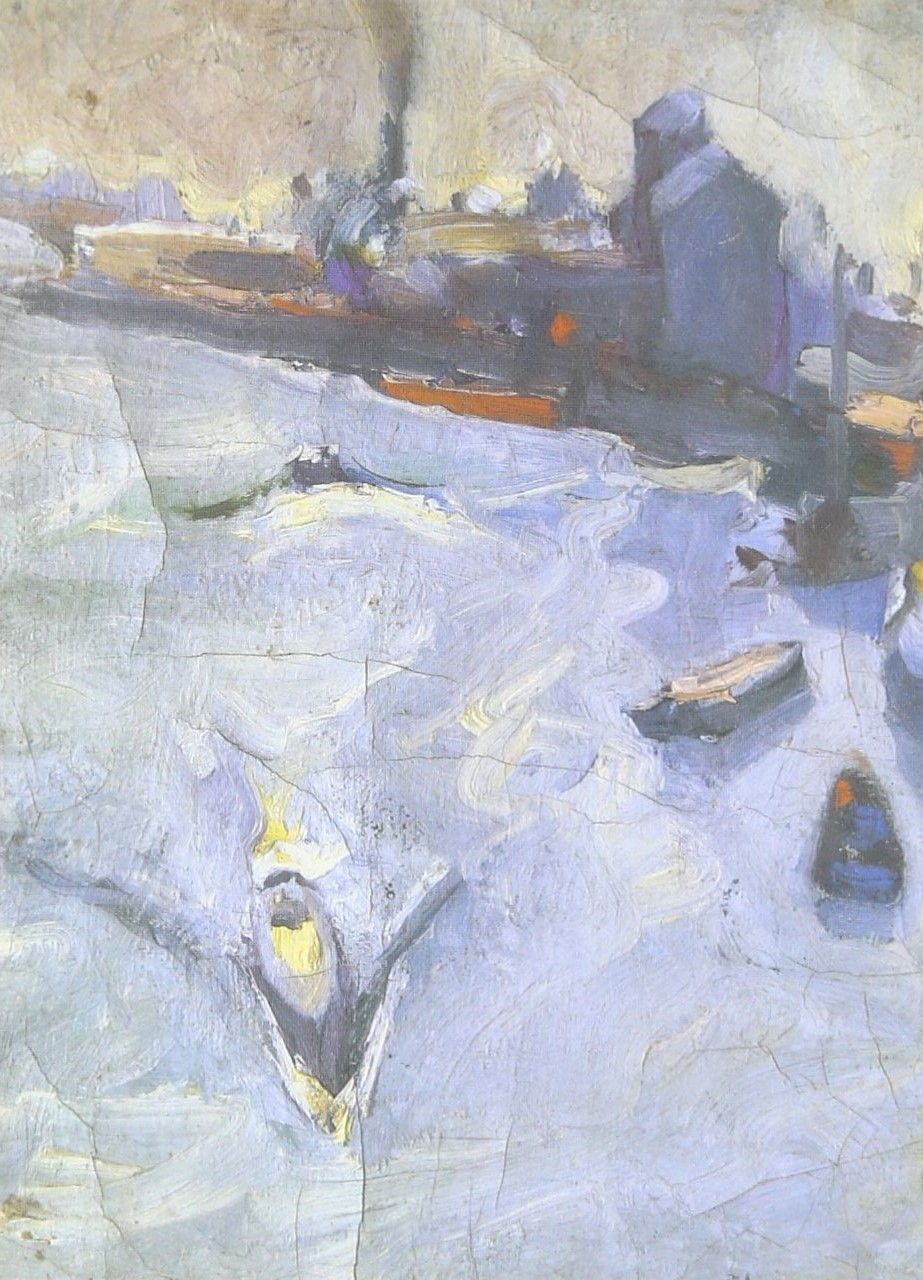
Alaska by Yotoku Miyagi, c. 1930

Yotoku Miyagi (宮城 与徳, Miyagi Yotoku; 1903–1943) was an Okinawan Marxist artist, Communist Party USA member, and a member of Richard Sorge's spy ring.

== Early life ==
Miyagi was born in Okinawa in 1903. When he was sixteen, he went to California after contracting tuberculosis. He arrived in Los Angeles in 1926, where he worked as an artist and ran the Owl Restaurant. Miyagi was aware of the exploitation of Okinawan farmers by the Japanese, and witnessed similar treatment of Japanese by Americans.

In 1931 Miyagi became a member of the Japanese Section of the CPUSA, but was never an active party member. In 1927, he married a Japanese girl, and in 1932 he and his wife rented a flat in West Los Angeles.

== Career ==
In 1932, he was asked to return to Japan on a mission for the Comintern. On October 24, 1933, he left San Pedro on the Buenos Aires Maru, bound for Yokohama. He expected to return to the United States.

While in Japan, Miyagi established a network of informants, which included a secretary to an Imperial Army general. Miyagi translated Japanese reports and newspaper articles into English for Richard Sorge.

== Capture and death ==
By 1941, all the members of Sorge's spy ring had been rounded up, and they had all made confessions. Miyagi died in Sugamo Prison in Tokyo in the middle of his trial in 1943. He was 40 years old.

The Order of the Patriotic War (Second Class) was posthumously awarded to Yotoku Miyagi in 1964.

== See also ==
- Japanese dissidence during the Shōwa period
- Hotsumi Ozaki
