= Hans-Otto Meissner =

German diplomat and writer (1909–1992)

Hans-Otto Meissner (4 June 1909 – 8 September 1992) was a German lawyer and Nazi diplomat, posted in London, Tokyo, Moscow, and Milan, among other cities. He is best known as a writer and novelist publishing a series of books, which proved successful.

== Early life and education ==
Meissner was the second son of prominent German diplomat Otto Meissner and his wife, Hildegard Roos, in Alsatian in Strasbourg. His sister, Hildegard Meissner, was born in 1916.

In 1919, Otto Meissner became head of the office of Friedrich Ebert, the first President of the Weimar Republic and so the family moved to Berlin.

Meissner attended the Mommsen-Gymnasium, the Wilhelm-Gymnasium, the Falck-Realgymnasiums and the Arndt-Gymnasium in Berlin Dahlem. After graduation in 1929 Meissner began studying law and economics. From 1929 to 1933, he attended the University of Heidelberg, Lausanne, Grenoble, Freiburg im Breisgau, Berlin and Göttingen and Trinity College, Cambridge. In Cambridge, John Maynard Keynes was one of his tutors. Meissner began writing articles for various newspapers and magazines, including for the journal "Querschnitt". He passed the legal exam in Göttingen on 20 July 1933.

== Career ==
=== Diplomat (1933–1945) ===
CIA's post-war reports etc. on Hans Otto Meissner (PDF: NARA)

In December 1933, Meissner passed the entrance examination for the Foreign Service. On 12 December 1933 he was admitted to the SS (membership number 241,955) in the so-called Motor-SS (after 1 May 1940 in the rank of Hauptsturmführer). According to Meissner's autobiography, Prince Josias zu Waldeck und Pyrmont had proposed him to join.

In February 1934, Meissner entered the diplomatic service as a civil servant in the rank of attaché. He first belonged to Division IV "Eastern Europe, Scandinavia, East Asia". Other young leaders who came into the service with him included Ernst vom Rath.

In 1934, Meissner was in the barracks of the Leibstandarte SS Adolf Hitler in Berlin-Lichterfelde, where he had been ordered together with other members of the Berlin section of the Motor-SS to defend the institution in case of an SA rebellion. He became an eyewitness of executions in the course of the political purge known as the Röhm Putsch.

From August 1935 to March 1936, Meissner was employed at the German embassy in London. He passed the diplomatic consular examination on 24 June 1936, and in September, he was sent to the German embassy in Tokyo. He worked from December 1936 to December 1938 under Eugen Ott. On 12 December 1936, Meissner became a member of the NSDAP (membership number 3,762,629). From March 1939 until the declaration of war on 3 September 1939, he was reinstated at the German embassy in London.

From September 1939 to March 1940, he was employed in the Information Department of the Foreign Office in Berlin in Unit II (Military Intelligence and Propaganda Service) and from March to July 1940 to the German embassy in Moscow. From August 1940 to January 1941, he served in the Wehrmacht (XXXXI Army Corps) and then again at the embassy in Moscow from January 1941 to March 1941, followed, from March to December 1941, by service in the XXXXI. Corps of the German Army, where he was promoted to lieutenant of the reserve on 1 November 1941. After a wound on the Eastern Front in the tank battle on the Dubysa in December 1941, he returned to the diplomatic service.

In December 1941, Meissner was transferred under the name of a consul to the lead the German Consulate in Milan, which he led until 1945. He also had the function of a "cultural lecturer" such as by taking part in the meeting of the anti-Jewish foreign action under Horst Wagner in early April 1944 in Krummhübel, where the embassies' "Referees for Jewish Affairs" met to discuss a tightening of the European persecution of Jews and propaganda measures to shield them from public accusation by the Allied forces about the persecution of the Jews. According to the minutes of the meeting, Meissner made proposals to intensify the antisemitic propaganda and recommended "highlighting the strong Jewish participation in prohibited acts (black market, sabotage, etc.) in the anti-Jewish information work in Italy".

In May 1945, two weeks after the end of the war, Meissner and his consulate personnel were arrested by American troops at Bellagio and interned in prison camp No. 334 at Scandicci. After a few weeks, he and his fellow inmates were transferred to a comfortable camp in a hotel complex at Salsomaggiore. Meissner himself later said that a letter requesting help from Pope Pius XII (a close friend of the Meissner family since his time as nuncio in Berlin in the 1920s) had probably led to that improvement in his situation.

=== After 1945 ===
After the war, Meissner denied the authenticity of the conference minutes of the Krummhübler Conference of April 1944. On 29 April 1947 in Allied custody, he denied that he had made any of the documented antisemitic proposals.

After his release in October 1947, Meissner worked as a freelance journalist and writer. Until 1991, he published numerous travelogues, novels and biographies of great explorers, as well as his own autobiographical writings and works on recent contemporary history. His books have been translated into numerous languages, such as Bulgarian, Czech, Danish, Dutch, English, Finnish, French, Italian, Norwegian, Polish, Portuguese, Russian, Swedish, Slovenian and Spanish.

He publicly appeared as President of the "Deutsches Institut für Lebensformen", a post to which he was elected to on 28 June 1953 in Bad Pyrmont at the founding congress of the Society for Merits for the Revival of Cultivated Manners".

In spite of occasional criticism because of his past as a Nazi diplomat, Meissner received numerous honours. In 1986, he was awarded Grand Cross of Merit, at the suggestion of Franz Josef Strauß the then Minister-President of Bavaria.

He died 8 September 1992 in Unterwössen, Germany.

== Personal life ==
On 22 September 1937, Meissner married Estelle Dittenberger. They had a daughter, Andrea Meissner (born 1 March 1943).

In 1956, Meissner married the writer Marianne Mertens.

== Books ==
His works may be divided into three categories:

1. Political-historical books, e.g., The Seizure of Power on 30 January 1933
2. Travelogues, describing journeys Meissner himself took, e.g., Enchanting Wilderness: Hiking, Hunting, Flying in Alaska
3. Books concerning the lives of discoverers and explorers, e.g., The Congo Surrenders Its Secret
