= Hotsumi Ozaki =

Japanese journalist (1901–1944)

- 尾崎 秀実
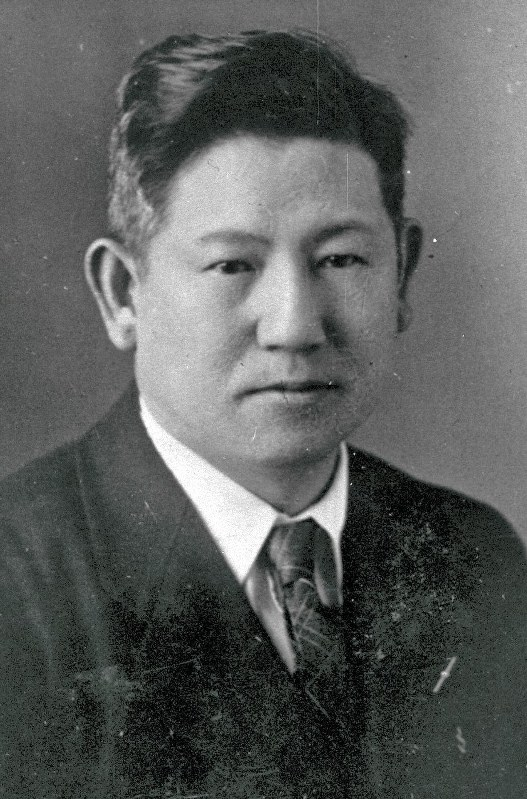
- Born: April 29, 1901; Shirakawa, Gifu, Japan
- Died: November 7, 1944 (aged 43); Sugamo Prison, Tokyo, Japan
- Cause of death: Execution by hanging
- Education: Tokyo Imperial University
- Occupations: Journalist, Spy
- Spouse: Eiko
- Children: Yoko

Hotsumi Ozaki (尾崎 秀実, Ozaki Hotsumi; April 29, 1901 – November 7, 1944) was a Japanese journalist working for the Asahi Shimbun newspaper, communist, Soviet intelligence agent, and advisor to Prime Minister Fumimaro Konoe. The only Japanese person to be hanged for treason (under the provisions of the Peace Preservation Law) by the Imperial Japanese government during World War II, Ozaki is well known as an informant of the Soviet agent Richard Sorge.

== Biography ==
Ozaki was born in what is now the town of Shirakawa, Gifu, and a descendant of a samurai family. His family relocated to Taiwan when he was a youth, and he grew up in Taipei. Growing up in Taiwan left Ozaki with a deep respect and affection for Chinese culture; he was very fond of the island where he had spent his childhood. Ozaki's father worked for the Japanese colonial government and taught his son that as Japan was the most advanced of the Asian nations it had a special "civilizing mission" - not only in Taiwan, but in all of Asia. Ozaki was brought up bilingual, and had an education steeped in the classics of both Japanese and Chinese literature in order to better understand China. Ozaki was opposed to the crude anti-Chinese racism of the Japanese ultra-nationalists, who saw the Chinese as a people fit only to be slaves, which led him to an increasing estrangement from his country as time went on. He returned to Japan in 1922, and enrolled in the Legal department of Tokyo Imperial University. He reached a turning point in the aftermath of the 1923 Great Kantō earthquake, wherein extreme right-wing groups engaged in vigilante killings of ethnic Koreans and left-wingers with impunity, amidst rumors that these groups were looting. Ozaki was greatly upset at the way that the government tolerated these killings and turned to Marxism. He left school without graduating in 1925, after becoming involved in the activities of the Japanese Communist Party. In 1926, he joined the Asahi Shimbun newspaper, where he wrote articles on Soviet leaders Vladimir Lenin and Joseph Stalin. He was transferred to the Osaka Mainichi Shimbun the following year.

From November 1928, Ozaki was dispatched to Shanghai in China. Ozaki arrived in Shanghai believing that it was Britain that had a parasitical economic relationship with China, and the Chinese nationalist movement was largely anti-British. It was a great shock to him to hear Chinese demonstrators shout "Expel Japan!" and "Boycott Japanese goods!". In Shanghai Ozaki soon made contact with members of the Chinese Communist Party, the left-wing journalist Agnes Smedley, and members of the Comintern leadership based in Shanghai. Smedley introduced him to Richard Sorge in 1930. In his newspaper articles, Ozaki showed himself very sympathetic towards Chinese nationalism and the struggle to undo the "unequal treaties". In 1932, Ozaki covered the First Battle of Shanghai, and was shocked to see Japanese soldiers execute Chinese POWs on the streets of Shanghai on the grounds that Chinese were mere "ants", not human beings, an event that deeply traumatized him. After his return to Japan, he moved back to Tokyo in 1934 where he linked up with Sorge.

By writing books and articles Ozaki established himself as an expert in Sino-Japanese relations. Thus he was recruited by Ryūnosuke Gotō in 1937 to join the Shōwa Kenkyūkai, a think tank established by Prime Minister Fumimaro Konoe. From 1938, he was invited by Konoe to become a member of his inner circle, or "Breakfast Club", of select members with whom he would confer on current events each week over breakfast. Ozaki, therefore, was in a position to participate in the making of decisions he was supposed to uncover.

Ozaki learned that Japan wanted to avoid a war with the Soviet Union, and let Sorge know of it. This information proved to be of utmost importance for the whole history of the Second World War: after Sorge relayed it to Soviet command, Moscow transferred 18 divisions, 1,700 tanks, and over 1,500 aircraft from Siberia and the Far East to the Western Front against the Nazi Germany during the most dangerous months of the Battle for Moscow.

On July 2, 1941, Ozaki as a member of the "Breakfast Club" supported a critical decision for Japanese expansion towards the Dutch East Indies and Singapore and against Hitler's request to invade Siberia. He was outspoken in his opposition and concerns with regards to the decision reached at the Gozen Kaigi conference of September 6, 1941 that war with the United States was unavoidable.

On October 15, 1941, Ozaki was arrested in conjunction with the Sorge Incident. During his trial, it was revealed that Ozaki had been working with Sorge since his return to Japan, and that through his close contacts with Konoe and other senior Japanese politicians, was able to gather information and to copy secret documents.

Ozaki was executed on November 7, 1944. A collection of letters that Ozaki wrote to his wife and daughter from prison explaining why he betrayed his country, was published under the name Love Is Like a Falling Star in 1946 and became a best-seller in Japan.

== Post-war legacy ==
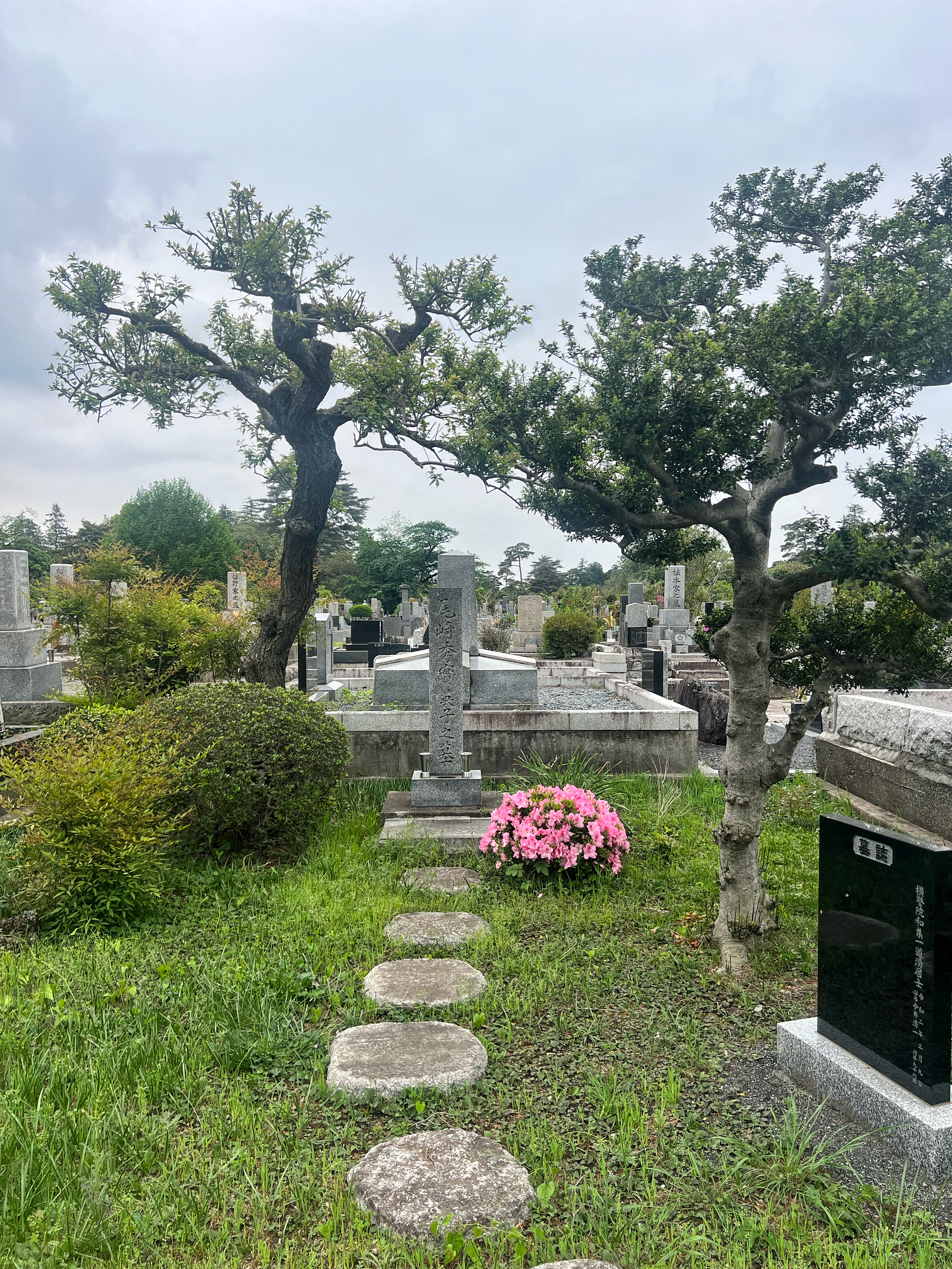
The grave of Hotsumi Ozaki in Tama Cemetery

After the war, Hotsumi Ozaki became viewed as a martyr. Annual visits to the tombs of Hotsumi Ozaki and Richard Sorge have been made since 1975. However, there is no monument to Hotsumi Ozaki.

== In the arts ==
- No Regrets for Our Youth is a Japanese film loosely based on Ozaki, written and directed by Akira Kurosawa.
- In the 2003 film Spy Sorge, directed by Masahiro Shinoda and based on the life of Richard Sorge, Ozaki is played by Masahiro Motoki.
- Kinoshita Junji, A Japanese Called Otto オットーと呼ばれる日本人. This play, centered on Ozaki, was first performed in 1962 and has been produced in Japan a number of times since, most recently in 2008. An English translation by Lawrence Rogers was published in Patriots and Traitors: Sorge and Ozaki: A Japanese Cultural Casebook, Merwin Asia, 2009.

== See also ==
- Yotoku Miyagi, spy working with Ozaki
- Sanzō Nosaka
- Hideo Noda
- Jun Tosaka
- Political dissidence in the Empire of Japan
