= Dmitry Karbyshev =

Russian Army general (1880–1945)

Dmitry Mikhaylovich Karbyshev
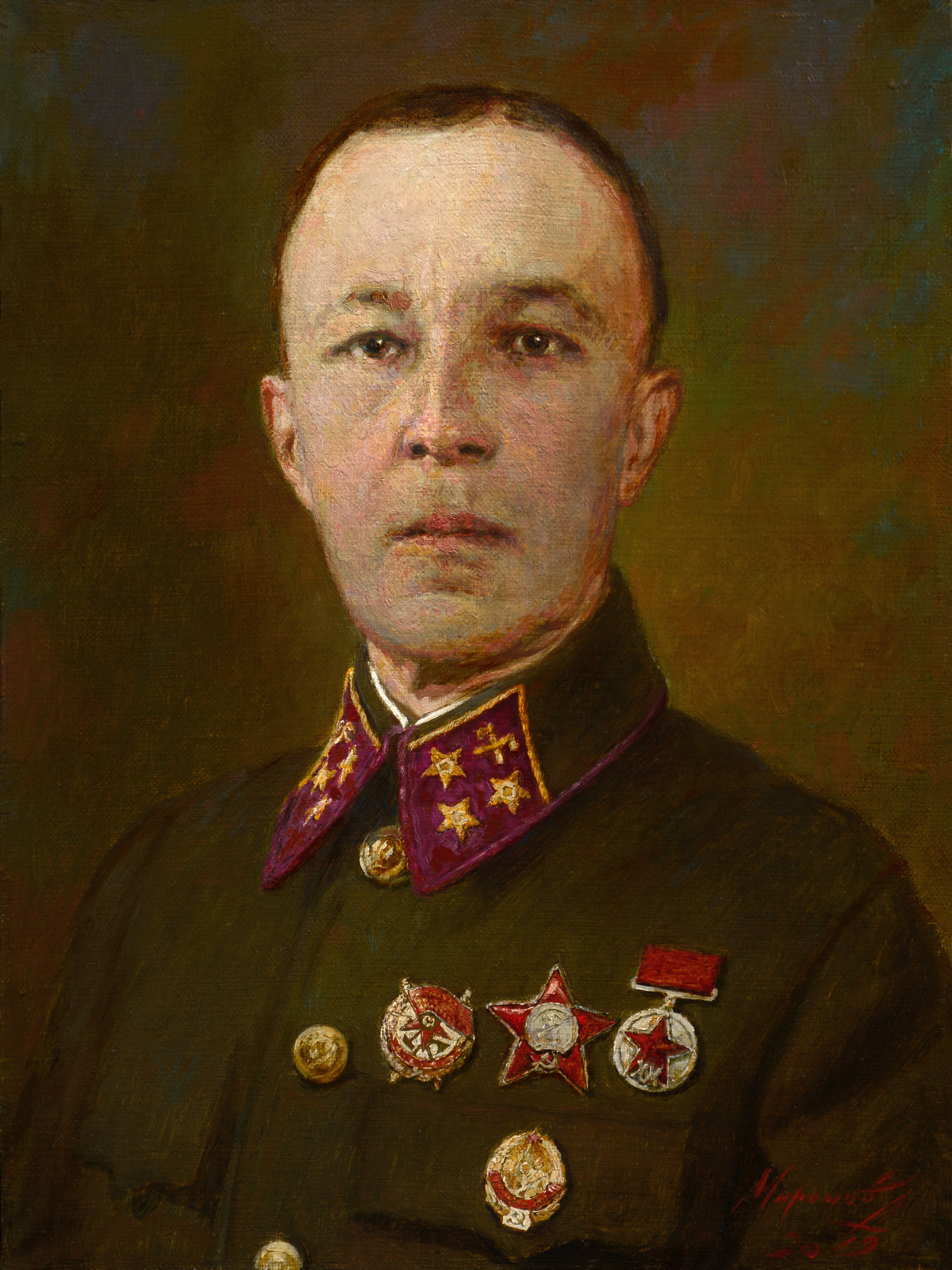
- Born: 26 October [O.S. 14 October] 1880; Omsk, Russian Empire
- Died: 18 February 1945 (aged 64); Mauthausen, Upper Austria, Nazi Germany
- Education: Military engineering-technical university, St. Petersburg
- Military career
- Allegiance: Russian Empire; Soviet Union
- Branch: Russian Imperial Army, Red Army
- Rank: Lieutenant General of Engineer Troops (1940); Lieutenant Colonel (1916)
- Conflicts: Russo-Japanese War; World War I; Russian Civil War; World War II; Winter War
- Awards: Hero of the Soviet Union

Dmitry Mikhaylovich Karbyshev (Russian: Дмитрий Михайлович Карбышев; 26 October [O.S. 14 October] 1880 – 18 February 1945) was a Red Army general, professor of the Soviet General Staff Academy (Doctor of Military Sciences), and Hero of the Soviet Union (posthumously).

== Biography ==
=== Early years ===
Karbyshev was born in Omsk to the well-known Siberian Cossack Starshyna family of Kryashen Tatar origin and spoke both Russian and Tatar of Kryashen accent. His father died when he was twelve, and he was raised by his mother. Despite financial difficulties, he graduated from the Siberian Cadet Corps (today Omsk Cadet Corps of Ministry of Defense) in 1898 and went on to attend the Saint-Petersburg Nikolaev Military Engineering College (Uchilishche), from which he graduated in 1900. He was assigned to serve in the 1st East Siberian Sapper Battalion, in charge of battlefield telegraph operations (chief of cable section of a telegraph company), and was stationed in Manchuria.

=== Russo-Japanese War and World War I ===
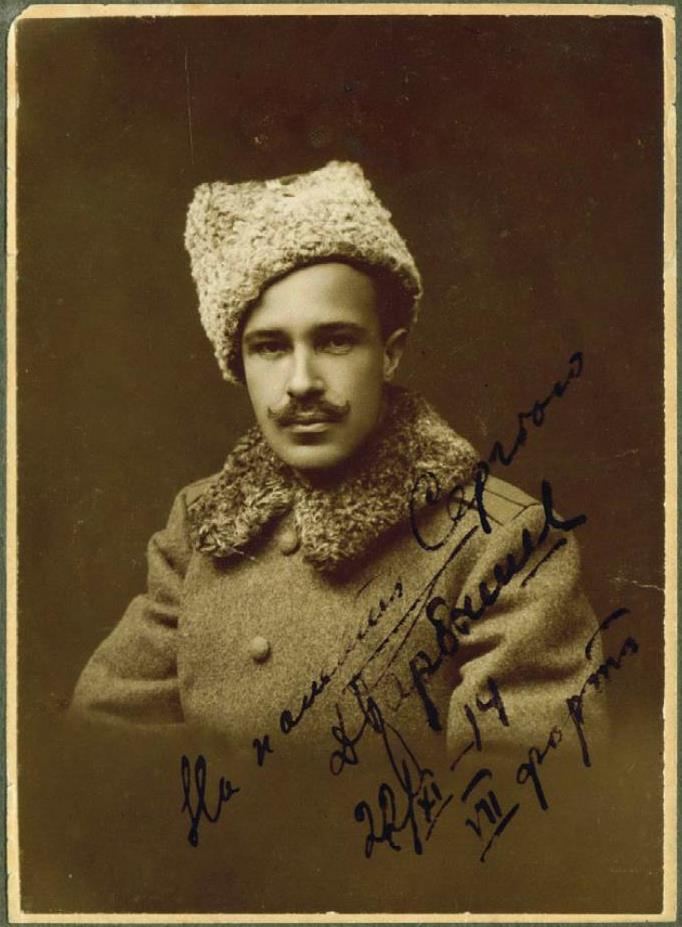
Karbyshev in 1914

During the Russo-Japanese War (1904 to 1905), Karbyshev was responsible in building bridges, and conducting reconnaissance patrols, as well as telegraph operations. He was at the Battle of Mukden and was decorated for bravery. He was promoted to Lieutenant (poruchik) at the end of the war.

Karbyshev subsequently served in Vladivostok. He returned to St. Petersburg to graduate from the Nikolaev Military Engineering Academy in 1911 (present-day Saint Petersburg Military Engineering-Technical University). Promoted to Staff Captain, he was then sent to Brest-Litovsk as commander of a sapper company, and participated in the construction of fortifications for the Brest Fortress.

At the start of World War I, Karbyshev was involved in combat operations in the Carpathians under General Aleksei Brusilov’s 8th Army on the Southwestern Front. At first he was the divisions' engineer for the 78th and the 69th Infantry Divisions, later chief of engineer service for the 22nd Finland Riflemen Corps. In early 1915, he was at the Siege of Przemyśl, where he was wounded in the leg. He was decorated with the Order of St. Anne for bravery and promoted to lieutenant colonel. In 1916, he participated in the Brusilov Offensive. With the February Revolution and the collapse of the Russian Empire, Karbyshev joined the local Red Guard in December 1917 while stationed at Mogilev-Podolsky (today Ukraine). From 1918, he was an officer in the Bolshevik Red Army.

=== Civil War ===
During the Russian Civil War, Karbyshev oversaw the construction of numerous fortifications, particularly the Kakhovka Platzdarm, and held senior positions at the headquarters of the North Caucasus Military District. In 1920, he was chief engineer of the Soviet 5th Army and the assistant of chief engineer of the Southern Front (second formation). Karbyshev supervised engineering support for the assaults on Chongar fortifications and Perekop against the White movement in the Crimea.

=== Interbellum period in academy ===
From 1923 to 1926, Karbyshev was the Chairman of the Engineering Committee of the Main Military Engineering Administration of the Red Army. In 1926, he became an instructor at the M. V. Frunze Military Academy, and in 1936, he joined the General Staff Academy. In 1929, Karbyshev was appointed to design Stalin line and Molotov line. In February 1934, he was appointed the Head of Department of Military-Engineering Science of General Staff Academy. Since 1936, Karbyshev was an assistant to the Head of Department of Large Formations' Tactics of the Academy. He was promoted to Professor in 1938, and to the military rank of lieutenant general in the Engineer Troops in 1940. In 1941, Karbyshev was awarded doctorate in military sciences. He published over 100 research papers in military engineering and military history. He specialized in the construction and demolition of obstacles, and in the issues involved in crossing rivers and other water obstacles. His articles and manuals on the theory of engineering and battlefield operations and tactics were mandatory for reading by Red Army commanders in the pre-war years. He also served as a consultant for the restoration of the Trinity Lavra of St. Sergius outside of Moscow.

=== World War II ===
During the Winter War of 1939–40 between the Soviet Union and Finland, as a member of the group to the assistant of chief of the Main Military-Engineering Administration in fortification construction Karbyshev travelled to the front lines to advise troops on engineering support in breaching the Mannerheim Line. He joined the Communist Party in 1940.

In early June 1941, Karbyshev was sent on the inspection trip to Western Special Military District. The German invasion occurred while he was at the headquarters of Soviet 3rd Army in Grodno. Two days later, he moved to the headquarters of the Soviet 10th Army. On June 27, 1941, the army became surrounded and eventually destroyed during the Battle of Białystok–Minsk. In August 1941, Karbyshev suffered from post-concussion syndrome in combat at the Dnieper River in what is now the Shklow Raion, Mogilev Region, and while unconscious was captured by the Nazis.

Karbyshev was held at a succession of concentration camps, including Hammelburg, Flossenbürg, Majdanek, Auschwitz, Sachsenhausen and, in February 1945, Mauthausen. Refusing repeated offers from the Nazis to solicit his cooperation, and despite his advanced age, he was one of the most active leaders of the camp resistance movement.

On the night of 17 February 1945, he was one of 500 prisoners undressed, doused with cold water and left to expire in the frost. According to the literary testimony of a camp survivor, Karbyshev stayed upright facing his executioners and shouted encouragements to his fellow prisoners.

After the end of the war, on 16 August 1946, he was posthumously awarded the Hero of the Soviet Union medal. A white-marble monument of Karbyshev by the sculptor Vladimir Tsigal stands at the Mauthausen concentration camp.

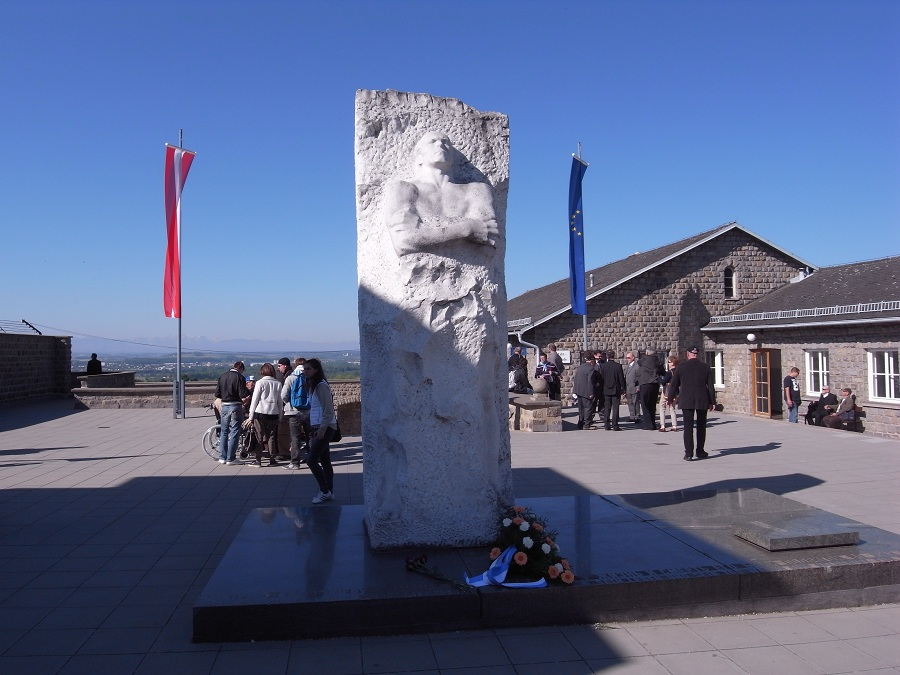
Karbyshev memorial at Mauthausen

== Personal life ==
He was married twice. He met his first wife Alisa Karlovna Troyanovich (1874-1913) of German descent, while serving in Vladivostok. After six years of married life Alisa died in 1913 and was buried in Brest at the Trishin's Cemetery.

While in Belarus, in 1916 Karbyshev married again a military nurse Lidiya Vasilyevna Opatskaya (1891–1976), who outlived her husband by 30 years. They had three children together - Yelena (1918-2006), Tatiana (1926—2003), and Aleksey (1929—1988).

Yelena followed in her father's footsteps and became a military engineer, having been awarded several orders and medals for her outstanding contributions. Tatiana worked as an economist, whereas Aleksey earned a Ph.D. in Economics and was a chairholder at the Moscow Financial Institute.

== Legacy ==
A minor planet 1959 Karbyshev discovered in 1972 by Soviet astronomer Lyudmila Zhuravlyova is named after him.

The Soviet Union issued a commemorative postage stamp in his honor in 1961 and in 1980. There are also streets in numerous cities in the former Soviet Union named after Karbyshev, and a Moscow Metro station named after one of those streets, which commemorates Karbyshev and the Engineer Troops.

== Awards and honors ==
Soviet Union

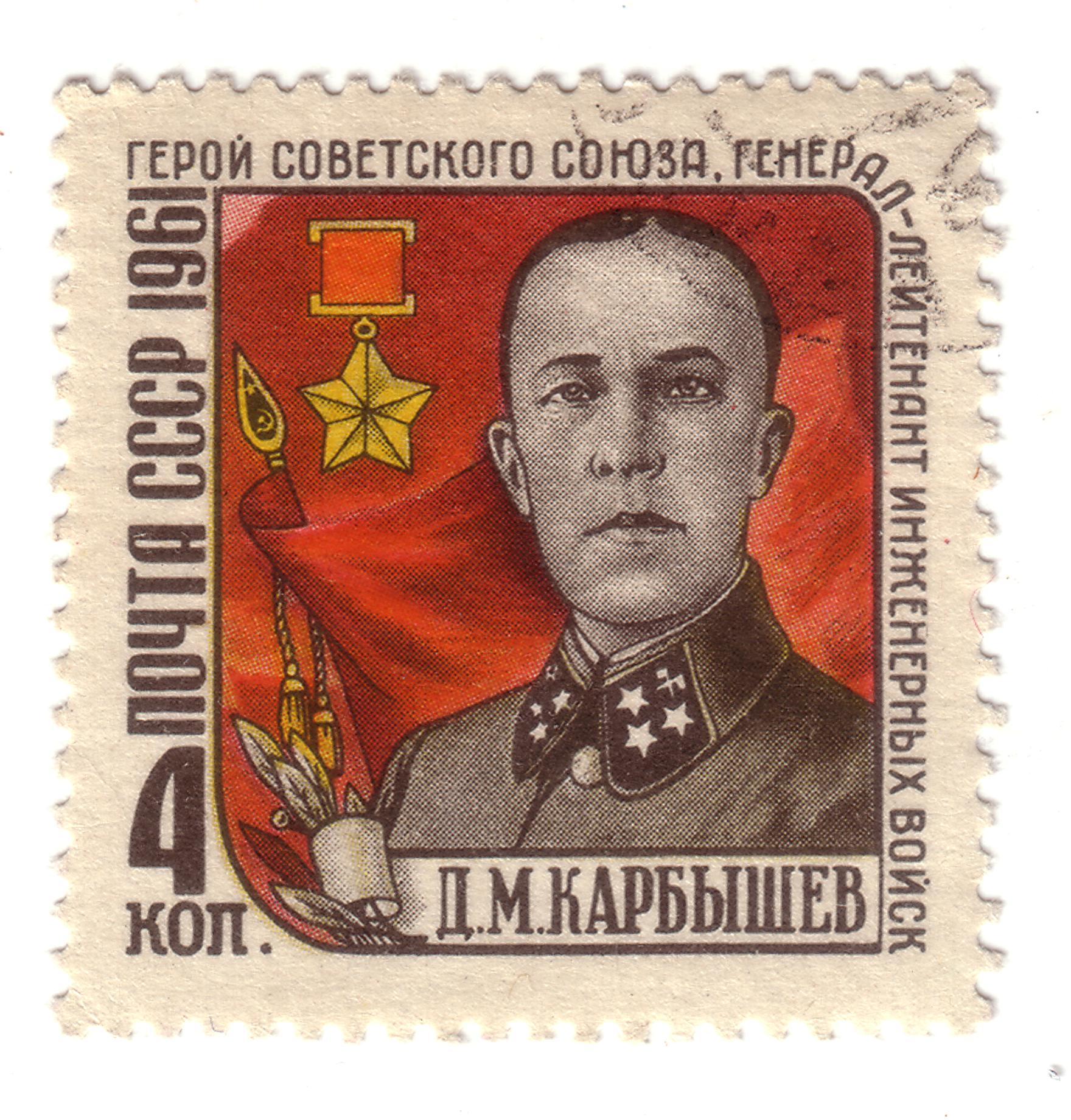
1961 Soviet stamp honoring Karbyshev

- Hero of the Soviet Union
- Order of Lenin
- Order of the Red Banner
- Order of the Red Star

Russian Empire

- Order of St. Vladimir, 4th degree
- Order of St. Anne 4th degree
- Order of St. Anne 3rd degree
- Order of St. Stanislaus 3rd degree with swords
- Order of St. Stanislaus 2nd degree
