= Vladimir Tsigal =

Soviet and Russian sculptor (1917–2013)

Vladimir Yefimovich Tsigal
- Владимир Ефимович Цигаль
- Born: 17 September 1917; Odesa, Kherson Governorate, Russian Empire
- Died: 4 June 2013 (aged 95); Moscow, Russia
- Resting place: Novodevichy Cemetery
- Political party: Communist Party of the Soviet Union (since 1952)
- Father: Yefim Tsigal
- Awards: State Stalin Prize; Lenin Prize; and others

Vladimir Yefimovich Tsigal (Russian: Владимир Ефимович Цигаль; 17 September 1917 – 4 July 2013) was a Soviet sculptor.

== Biography ==
Vladimir Tsigal was born on 17 September 1917, in Odesa to a Jewish family. His father was an engineer named Yefim, and his mother was Adela. He had an older brother named Victor. Tsigal attended the School No. 1 named after V. G. Belinsky in Penza from 1927 to 1930. In 1930, his family moved to Moscow and he began his studies at the Surikov Art Institute in 1937. He interrupted his studies in 1942 to volunteer in the Eastern Front of the World War II.

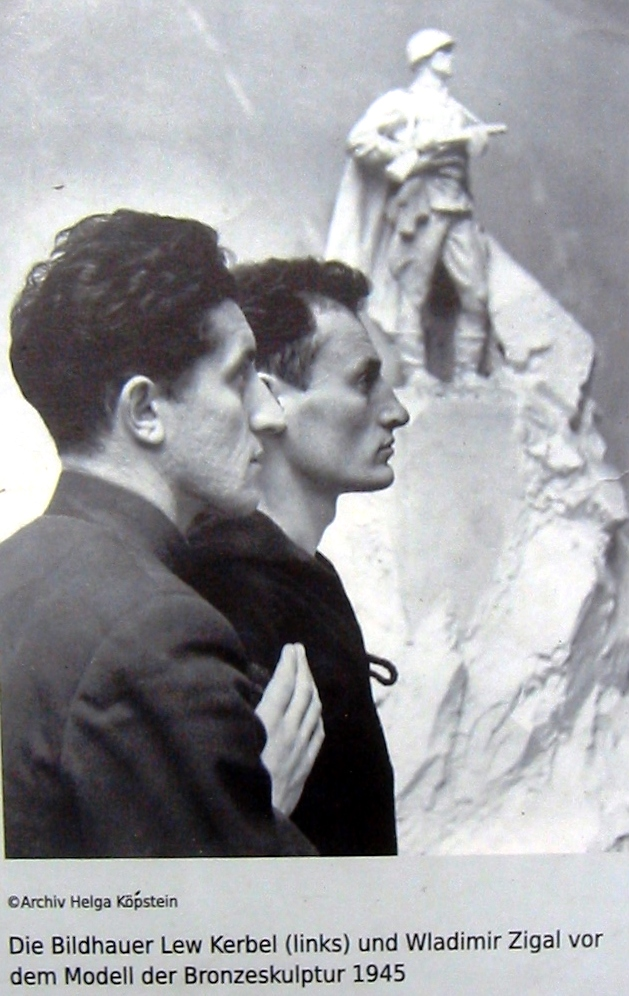
Tsigal (right) together with fellow Soviet sculptor Lev Kerbel, 1945

During World War II, Tsigal served as an artist in the Soviet Navy, working with the Black Sea and Baltic Fleets. In 1945 he moved to Berlin, where he built monuments to the Red Army with Lev Kerbel. He collaborated in monuments at Tiergarten among others.

After returning to Moscow in 1946, he resumed his studies at the Surikov Art Institute and received his sculptor diploma in 1948. He married Elizaveta Ignatskaya and had two children, Alexander (1948) and Tatyana (1951).

Tsigal became a member of the Artists' Union of the USSR since 1943, the Art Council of the Ministry of Culture since 1950, and the Communist Party of the Soviet Union in 1952.

Vladimir Tsigal died in Moscow in and was buried at the Novodevichy Cemetery.

== Works ==
Throughout his career, Tsigal created numerous monumental works that can be found in Russia and other countries. His most famous works include the monument to Richard Sorge and the monument to Lieutenant General Dmitry Karbyshev who was killed in a Nazi concentration camp.

== Titles and awards ==
- State Stalin Prize (1950)
- Lenin Prize (1984)
- Honored Artist of the RSFSR (1961)
- Honored Art Worker of the RSFSR (1965)
- People's Painter of the RSFSR (1968)
- People's Painter of the USSR (1978)
- Order of the Patriotic War (1985)
- Order of the Red Banner of Labour (1987)
- Order of Friendship of Peoples (1993)
- Order of Honour (2002)
- Order "For Merit to the Fatherland" (2007, 2012)
- Medal "For Courage" (1943)
- Meritorious Activist of Culture (1974)
- Friendship Order (1998)

== Gallery ==
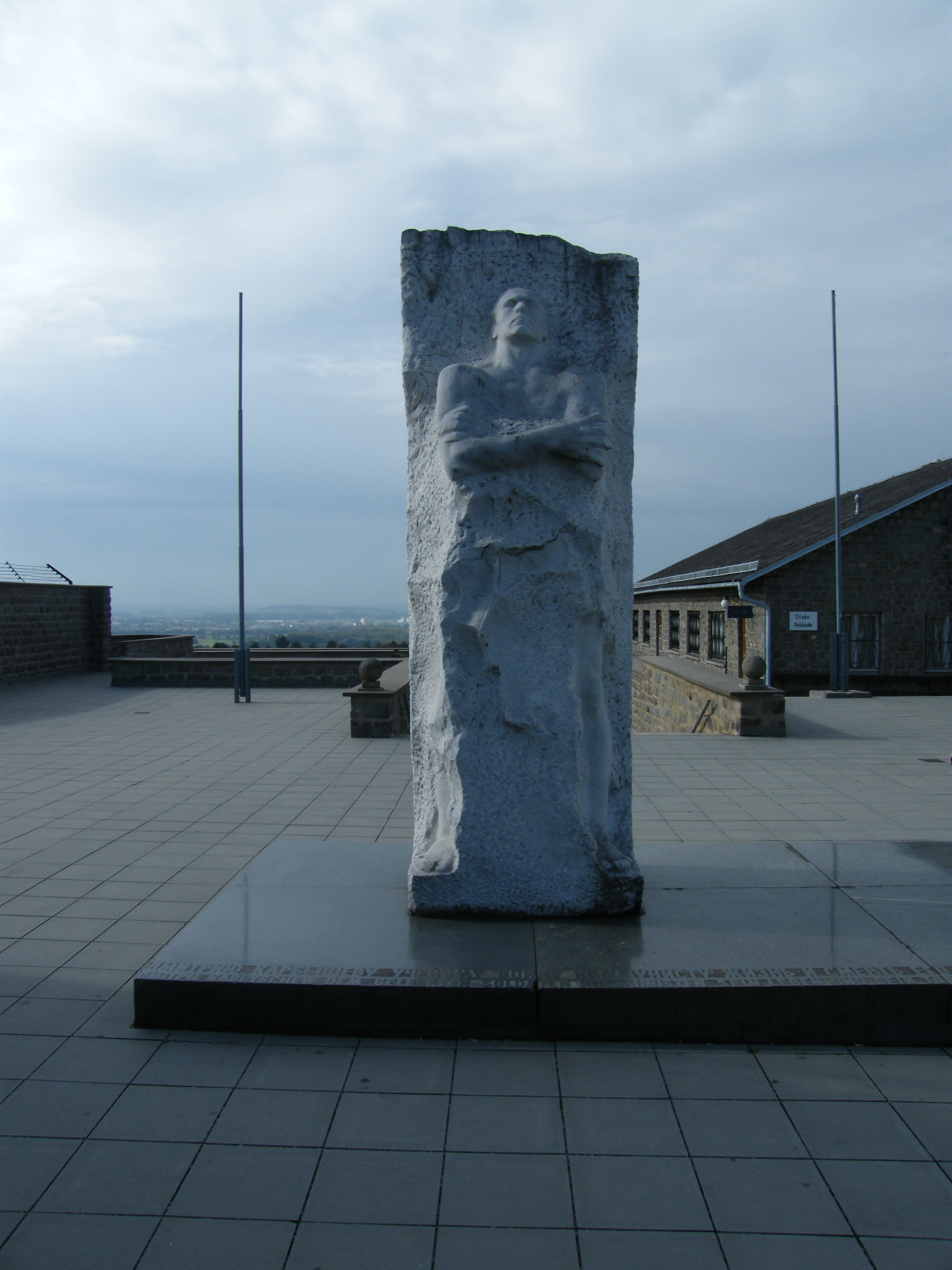
Monument to Lieutenant General Dmitry Karbyshev, Mauthausen, Austria

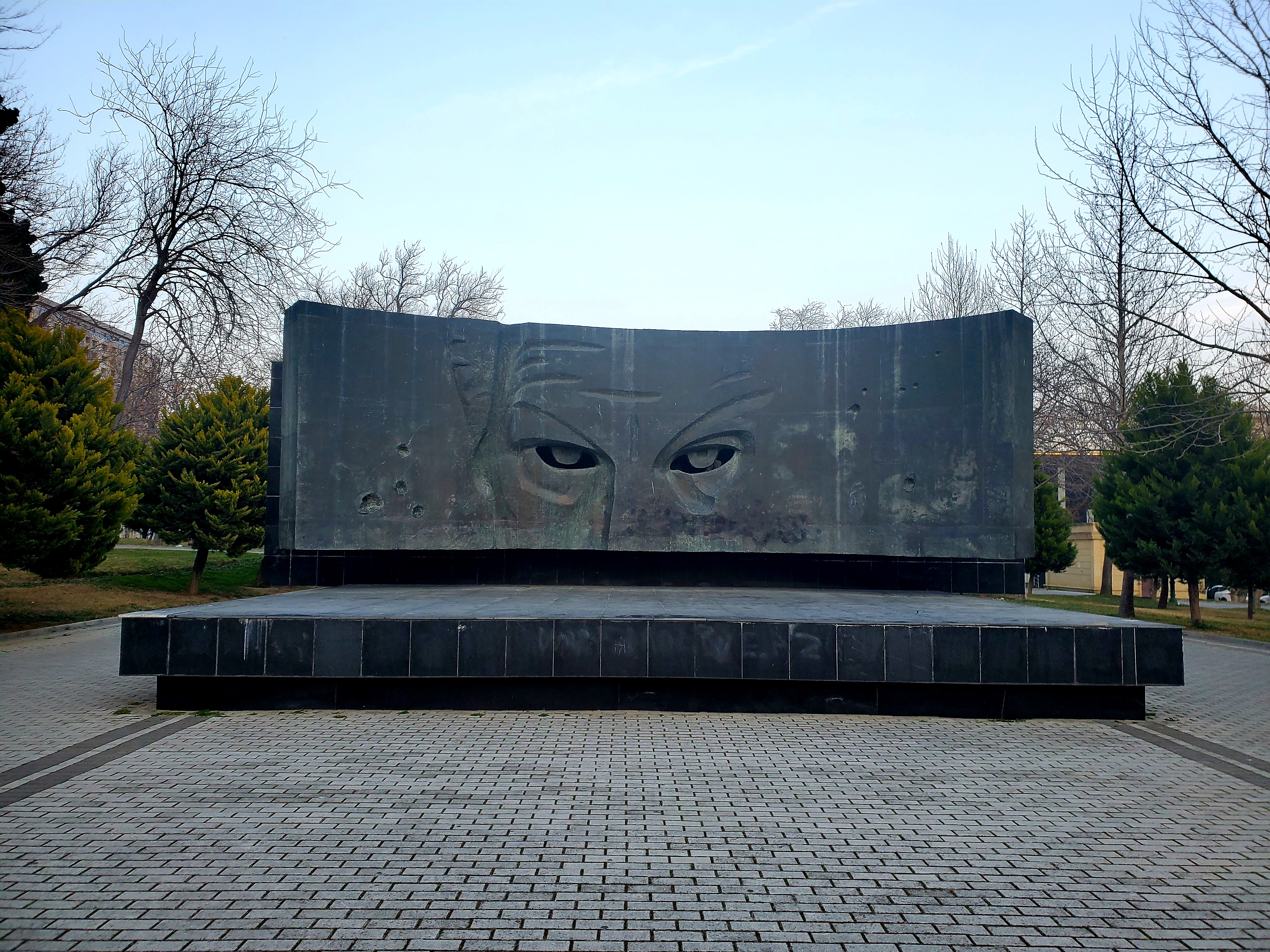
Monument to Richard Sorge, Baku, Azerbaijan
