= Engineer Troops (Soviet Union) =

Branch of the Soviet Armed Forces

Engineer Troops of the USSR (Russian: Инженерные войска СССР) were special troops of the Soviet Armed Forces, designed for military engineer support: combat operations; engineering reconnaissance, and escort of troops (forces) in the offensive, and so on.

The main purpose of military engineers is operational support during combat: mobility/counter-mobility. Engineering support for the military (combat) operations of the troops aims to create the necessary conditions for the troops covertly move forward, in a timely fashion, deploy, manoeuvre, successfully carry out combat missions, protect troops and facilities from all types of damage, inflict losses on the enemy, and to impede enemy actions.

== History ==
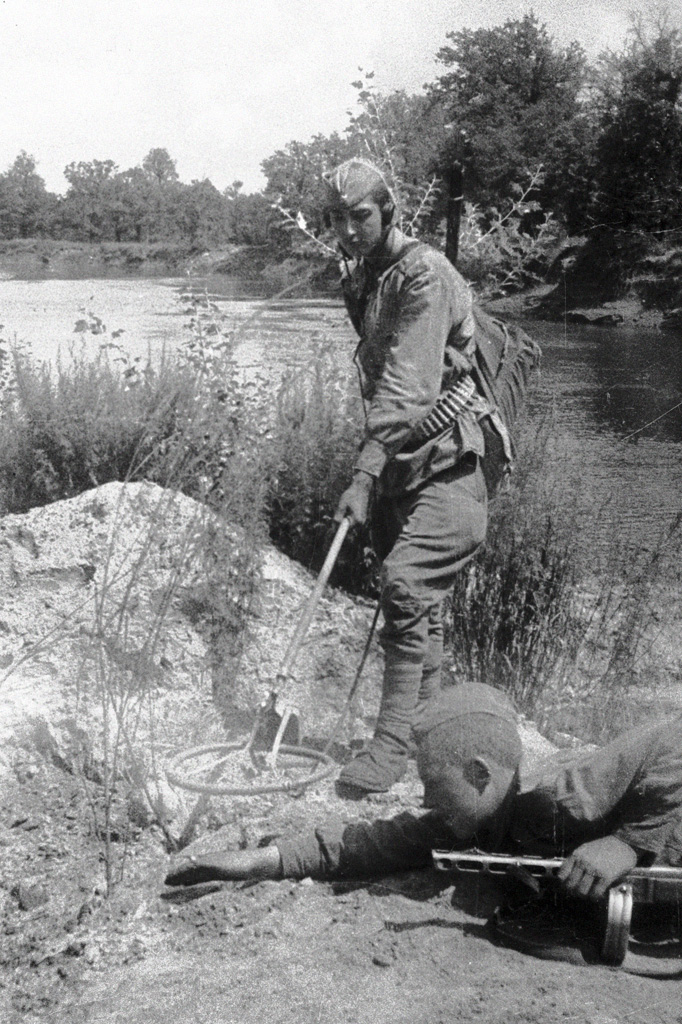
Posed propaganda photo of Soviet sappers defusing explosive devices in August 1942, during the Second World War

After the February and October Revolutions of 1917, during the organization of the Red Army and the fleet, sapper units of the former Russian Imperial Army were merged into the Red Army. In 1919, pontoon and electrical battalions, automobile units, camouflage companies, and a mine-blasting brigade were created. By 1929, the general formation of engineering troops in the Red Army was completed.

On 22 June 1941, Germany invaded the Soviet Union in Operation Barbarossa. In October 1941, the post of chief of the Engineering Troops was established. During the course of the war, engineer troops built fortifications, created barriers, mined the terrain, ensured the maneuver of troops, made passages in enemy minefields, ensured the overcoming of enemy engineering barriers, forcing water barriers, participated in the assault on fortifications, cities, etc. During the Second World War, 10 sapper armies were created, later reorganized into brigades.

V.I. Feskov et al 2013 lists 11 pontoon-bridge and 76 engineer sapper brigades in the Red Army in 1946, including the 1st Guards, 2nd Guards, 3rd Guards, 4th, 5th, and 6th Guards engineer brigades and other engineer brigades (including the 52nd, 55th, 56th, 57th, 61st, 62nd, 63rd, 64th, 65th, 67th, 68th, 69th, and 70th).

From the mid-1940s to the 1970s, motorized rifle regiments included engineer-sapper companies (иср), in divisions - engineer-sapper battalions (исб), in combined-arms armies and districts - engineering and sapper regiments (исп), as well as specialized battalions and regiments: pontoon-bridge, crossing-landing, road, bridge-building, etc. However due to planning miscalculations, the Soviet invasion of Afghanistan (1979–89) had a shortage of engineer units.

V.I. Feskov et al 2013 lists 26 regiments of engineer forces as existing during the 1980s, including the 1st Guards, 174th, and 177th. There were also three road construction corps and 25 road construction brigades seemingly active as part of the Road Troops.

In 1986, the Engineering Troops took part in the military response to the biological effects of the Chernobyl accident. After the collapse of the USSR in late 1991, the Engineering Troops were dissolved and its component units were split, becoming the Russian Engineer Troops, as well as being absorbed by the newly formed Armed Forces of Ukraine, Armed Forces of Belarus, Armed Forces of the Republic of Kazakhstan, Armenian Armed Forces, and others.

== Tasks ==
According to the combat Regulations of the Soviet Ground Forces, engineering support includes:

- engineering reconnaissance enemy, terrain and objects;
- fortification equipment of positions, lines, districts, command posts;
- device and maintenance of engineering barriers, and the production of destruction;
- installation and maintenance of nuclear mines and land mines;
- destruction and neutralization of enemy nuclear mines;
- making and maintaining passages in barriers and destruction;
- the device of passages through obstacles;
- clearance of terrain and objects;
- preparation and maintenance of troop movement routes, transportation and evacuation;
- equipment and maintenance of crossings when forcing water barriers;
- engineering measures to camouflage troops and facilities;
- engineering measures to restore the combat capability of troops and eliminate the consequences of enemy nuclear strikes;
- extraction and purification of water, equipment of points of water supply.

The Engineer Troops performed engineering support missions that required special training of personnel, the use of engineering Equipment and engineer ammunition. In addition, their tasks include defeating enemy equipment and manpower with mine-explosive and nuclear-mine weapons.

== Commanders ==
Rank	Name	Term start	Term end
Marshal of the Engineering Troops	Mikhail Vorobiev	1942	1952
Marshal of the Engineering Troops	Alexei Proshlyakov	1952	1965
Marshal of the Engineering Troops	Viktor Kharchenko	1965	1975
Marshal of the Engineering Troops	Sergey Aganov	1975	1987
Colonel General of the Engineering Troops	Vladimir Kuznetsov	1987	1991

== See also ==
- Sapper army
- Assault Engineering Brigades
