= School of Military Engineering =

School of Military Engineering may refer to a training institution for military engineering such as:

- Royal School of Military Engineering of the British Army
- Canadian Forces School of Military Engineering of both the Canadian Army and the Royal Canadian Air Force
- College of Military Engineering, Pune of the Indian Army
- Military College of Engineering, Risalpur of the Pakistani Army
- Sri Lanka School of Military Engineering of the Sri Lanka Army
- New Zealand School of Military Engineering of the New Zealand Army
- Military Engineering-Technical University of the Russian Army
- School of Military Engineering of the Australian Army
