= Military engineering =

Building and maintaining structures and systems for armies

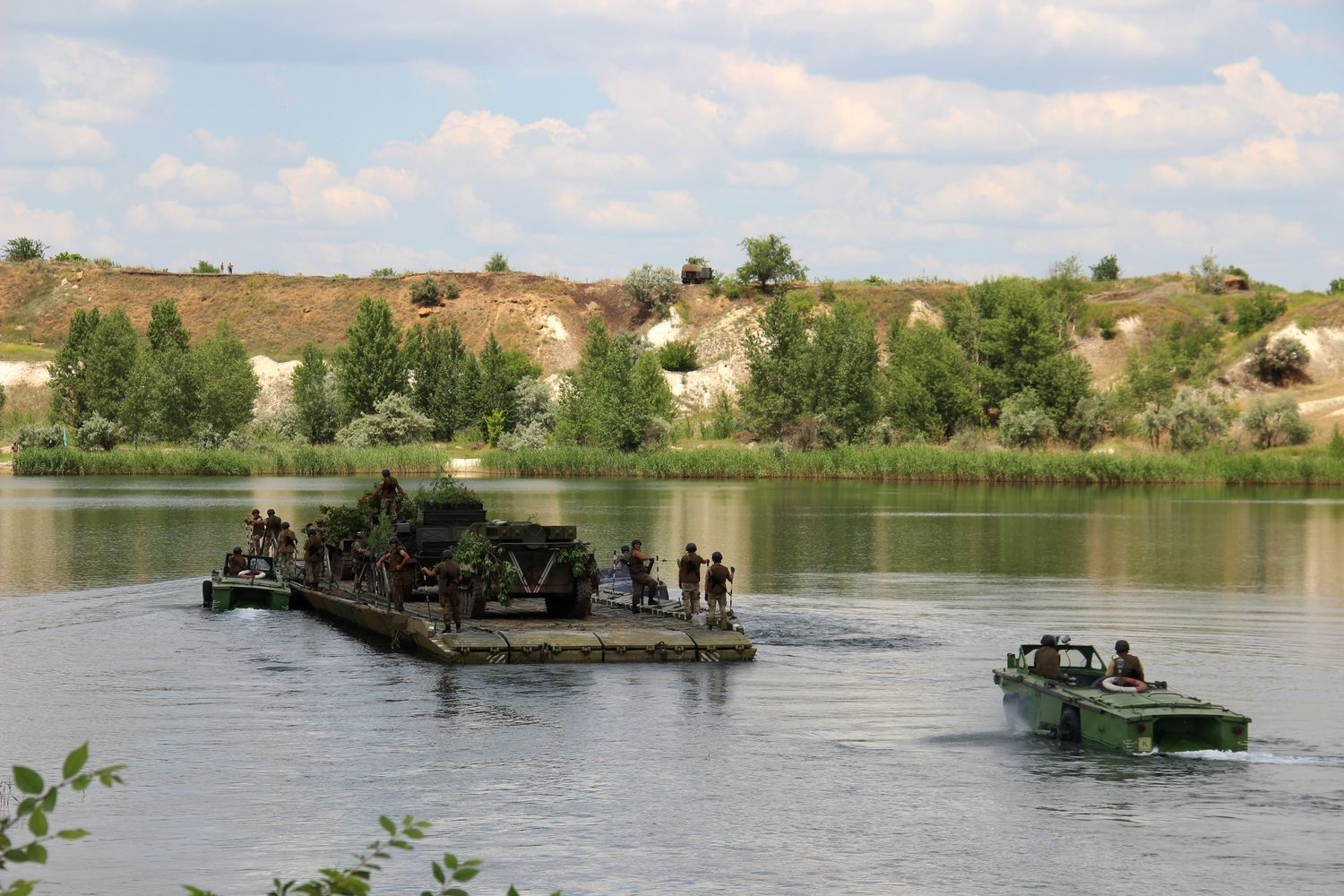
Military engineer training in Ukraine, 2017

Military engineering is loosely defined as the art, science, and practice of designing and building military works and maintaining lines of military transport and military communications. Military engineers are also responsible for logistics behind military tactics. Military engineering is a predecessor of civil engineering, currently differing in its applications across disciplines and specialized work. In the 20th and 21st centuries, military engineering also includes CBRN defense and other engineering disciplines such as mechanical and electrical engineering techniques.

According to NATO, "military engineering is that engineer activity undertaken, regardless of component or service, to shape the physical operating environment. Military engineering incorporates support to maneuver and to the force as a whole, including military engineering functions such as engineer support to force protection, counter improvised explosive devices, environmental protection, engineer intelligence and military search. Military engineering does not encompass the activities undertaken by those 'engineers' who maintain, repair and operate vehicles, vessels, aircraft, weapon systems and equipment."

Military engineering is an academic subject taught in military academies or schools of military engineering. The construction and demolition tasks related to military engineering are usually performed by military engineers including soldiers trained as sappers or pioneers. In modern armies, soldiers trained to perform such tasks while well forward in battle and under fire are often called combat engineers.

In some countries, military engineers may also perform non-military construction tasks in peacetime such as flood control and river navigation works, but such activities do not fall within the scope of military engineering.

== Etymology ==
The word engineer was initially used in the context of warfare, dating back to c. 1380 when it referred to "a constructor of military engines". In this context, "engine" referred to a military machine, i.e., a mechanical contraption used in war (for example, a catapult).

As the design of civilian structures such as bridges and buildings developed as a technical discipline, the term civil engineering entered the lexicon as a way to distinguish between those specializing in the construction of such non-military projects and those involved in the older discipline. As the prevalence of civil engineering outstripped engineering in a military context and the number of disciplines expanded, the original military meaning of the word "engineering" is now largely obsolete. In its place, the term "military engineering" has come to be used.

== History ==
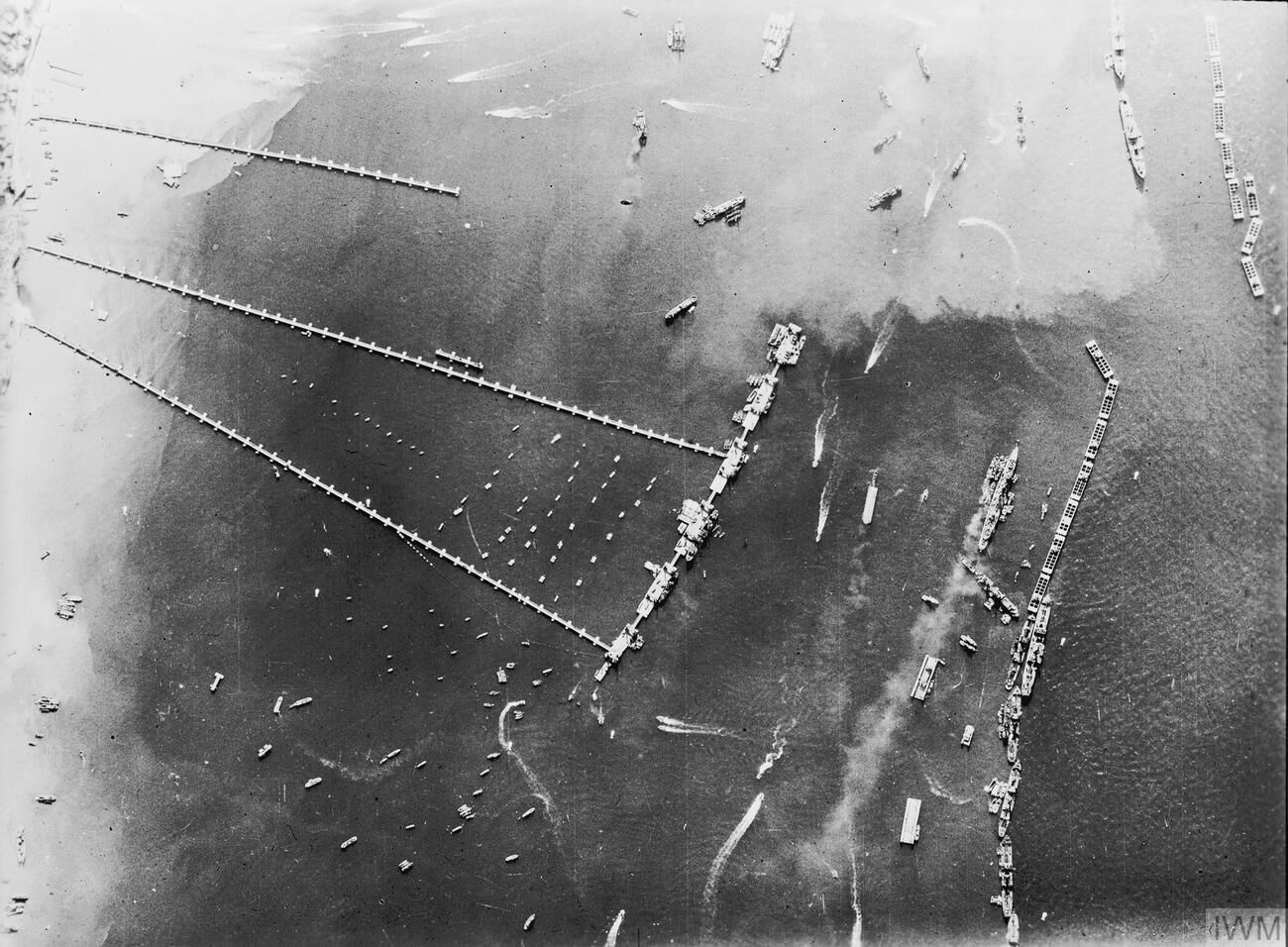
Aerial view of Mulberry harbour "B" (27 October 1944)

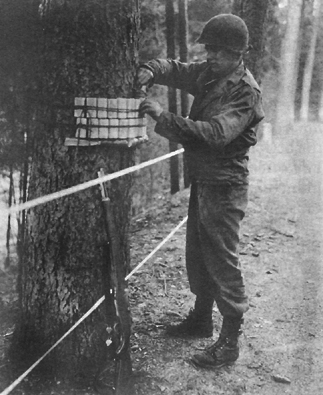
US Combat Engineer setting a charge (1944)

=== Ancient times ===
Military engineers were responsible for siege warfare and building field fortifications, temporary camps and roads. The most notable engineers of ancient times were the Romans and Chinese, who constructed huge siege-machines (catapults, battering rams and siege towers). The Romans were responsible for constructing fortified wooden camps and paved roads for their legions. Many of these Roman roads are still in use today.

The first civilization known to have a dedicated force of military engineering specialists were the Romans, whose army contained a dedicated corps of military engineers known as architecti. This group was pre-eminent among its contemporaries. The construction of a double-wall of fortifications 30 miles (48 km) long, in just six weeks to completely encircle the city of Alesia in 52 BC, is an example. Such military engineering feats were completely new, and probably bewildering and demoralizing, to the Gallic defenders. Vitruvius is the best known of these Roman army engineers, due to his writings surviving.

Examples of battles before the early modern period where military engineers played a decisive role include the Siege of Tyre under Alexander the Great, the Siege of Masada by Lucius Flavius Silva as well as the Battle of the Trench under the suggestion of Salman the Persian to dig a trench.

=== Middle Ages ===
For about 600 years after the fall of the Roman Empire, the practice of military engineering barely evolved in the west. In fact, much of the classic techniques and practices of Roman military engineering were lost. Through this period, the foot soldier (who was pivotal to much of the Roman military engineering capability) was largely replaced by mounted soldiers. It was not until later in the Middle Ages, that military engineering saw a revival focused on siege warfare.

Military engineers planned castles and fortresses. When laying siege, they planned and oversaw efforts to penetrate castle defenses. When castles served a military purpose, one of the tasks of the sappers was to weaken the bases of walls to enable them to be breached before means of thwarting these activities were devised. Broadly speaking, sappers were experts at demolishing or otherwise overcoming or bypassing fortification systems.

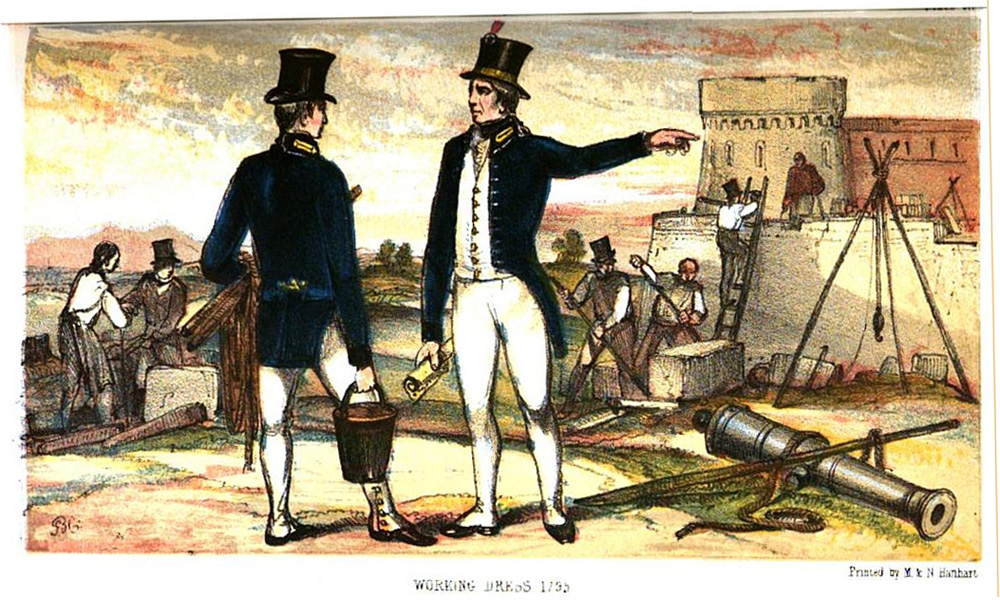
Working dress of the Royal Military Artificers in Gibraltar, 1795

With the 14th-century development of gunpowder, new siege engines in the form of cannons appeared. Initially military engineers were responsible for maintaining and operating these new weapons just as had been the case with previous siege engines. In England, the challenge of managing the new technology resulted in the creation of the Office of Ordnance around 1370 in order to administer the cannons, armaments and castles of the kingdom. Both military engineers and artillery formed the body of this organization and served together until the office's successor, the Board of Ordnance was disbanded in 1855.

In comparison to older weapons, the cannon was significantly more effective against traditional medieval fortifications. Military engineering significantly revised the way fortifications were built in order to be better protected from enemy direct and plunging shot. The new fortifications were also intended to increase the ability of defenders to bring fire onto attacking enemies. Fort construction proliferated in 16th-century Europe based on the trace italienne design.

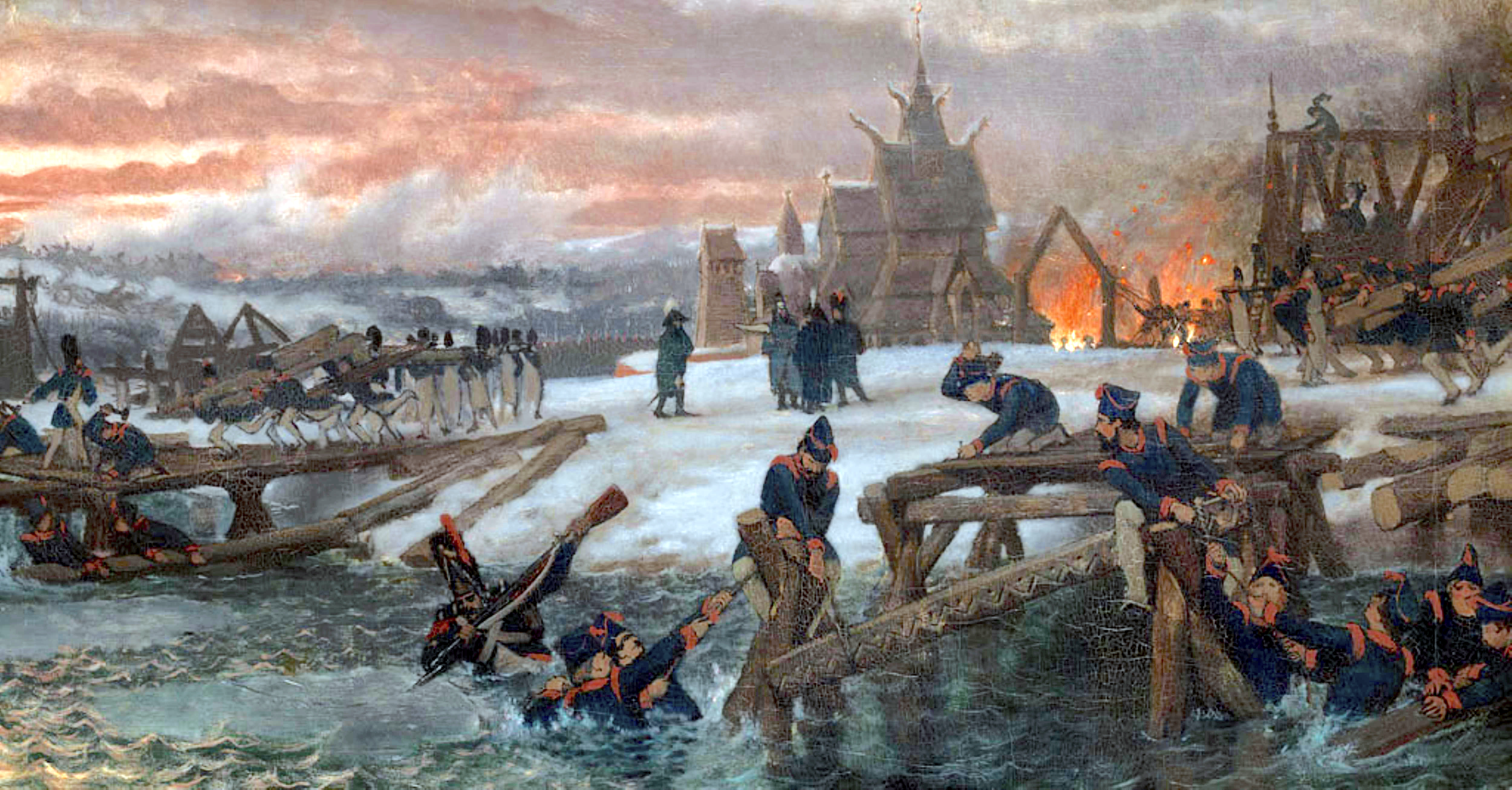
Dutch sappers during the Battle of Berezina in 1812

=== Modern era ===
By the 18th century, regiments of foot (infantry) in the British, French, Prussian and other armies included pioneer detachments. In peacetime these specialists constituted the regimental tradesmen, constructing and repairing buildings, transport wagons, etc. On active service they moved at the head of marching columns with axes, shovels, and pickaxes, clearing obstacles or building bridges to enable the main body of the regiment to move through difficult terrain. The modern Royal Welch Fusiliers and French Foreign Legion still maintain pioneer sections who march at the front of ceremonial parades, carrying chromium-plated tools intended for show only. Other historic distinctions include long work aprons and the right to wear beards. In West Africa, the Ashanti army was accompanied to war by carpenters who were responsible for constructing shelters and blacksmiths who repaired weapons. By the 18th century, sappers were deployed in the Dahomeyan army during assaults against fortifications.

The Peninsular War (1808–14) revealed deficiencies in the training and knowledge of officers and men of the British Army in the conduct of siege operations and bridging. During this war low-ranking Royal Engineers officers carried out large-scale operations. They had under their command working parties of two or three battalions of infantry, two or three thousand men, who knew nothing in the art of siegeworks. Royal Engineers officers had to demonstrate the simplest tasks to the soldiers, often while under enemy fire. Several officers were lost and could not be replaced, and a better system of training for siege operations was required. On 23 April 1812 an establishment was authorised, by Royal Warrant, to teach "Sapping, Mining, and other Military Fieldworks" to the junior officers of the Corps of Royal Engineers and the Corps of Royal Military Artificers, Sappers and Miners.

The first courses at the Royal Engineers Establishment were done on an all ranks basis with the greatest regard to economy. To reduce staff the NCOs and officers were responsible for instructing and examining the soldiers. If the men could not read or write they were taught to do so, and those who could read and write were taught to draw and interpret simple plans. The Royal Engineers Establishment quickly became the centre of excellence for all fieldworks and bridging. Captain Charles Pasley, the director of the Establishment, was keen to confirm his teaching, and regular exercises were held as demonstrations or as experiments to improve the techniques and teaching of the Establishment. From 1833 bridging skills were demonstrated annually by the building of a pontoon bridge across the Medway which was tested by the infantry of the garrison and the cavalry from Maidstone. These demonstrations had become a popular spectacle for the local people by 1843, when 43,000 came to watch a field day laid on to test a method of assaulting earthworks for a report to the Inspector General of Fortifications. In 1869 the title of the Royal Engineers Establishment was changed to "The School of Military Engineering" (SME) as evidence of its status, not only as the font of engineer doctrine and training for the British Army, but also as the leading scientific military school in Europe.

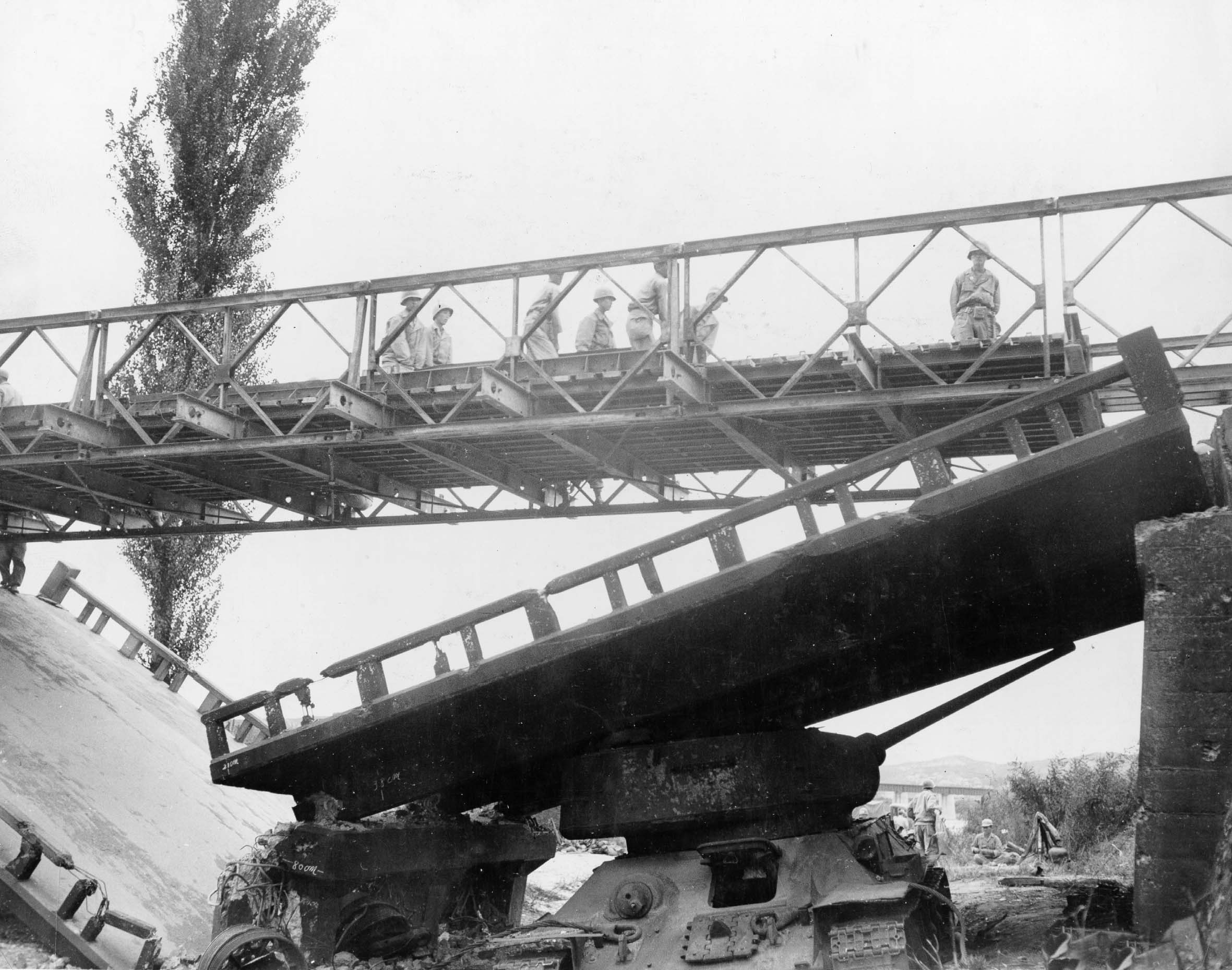
A Bailey bridge being deployed in the Korean War to replace a bridge destroyed in combat.

The dawn of the internal combustion engine marked the beginning of a significant change in military engineering. With the arrival of the automobile at the end of the 19th century and heavier than air flight at the start of the 20th century, military engineers assumed a major new role in supporting the movement and deployment of these systems in war. Military engineers gained vast knowledge and experience in explosives. They were tasked with planting bombs, landmines and dynamite.

At the end of World War I, the standoff on the Western Front caused the Imperial German Army to gather experienced and particularly skilled soldiers to form "Assault Teams" which would break through the Allied trenches. With enhanced training and special weapons (such as flamethrowers), these squads achieved some success, but too late to change the outcome of the war. In early WWII, however, the Wehrmacht "Pioniere" battalions proved their efficiency in both attack and defense, somewhat inspiring other armies to develop their own combat engineers battalions. Notably, the attack on Fort Eben-Emael in Belgium was conducted by Luftwaffe glider-deployed combat engineers.

The need to defeat the German defensive positions of the "Atlantic wall" as part of the amphibious landings in Normandy in 1944 led to the development of specialist combat engineer vehicles. These, collectively known as Hobart's Funnies, included a specific vehicle to carry combat engineers, the Churchill AVRE. These and other dedicated assault vehicles were organized into the specialized 79th Armoured Division and deployed during Operation Overlord – 'D-Day'.

Other significant military engineering projects of World War II include the Mulberry harbours and Operation Pluto.

Modern military engineering still retains the Roman role of building field fortifications, road paving and breaching terrain obstacles. A notable military engineering task was, for example, breaching the Suez Canal during the Yom Kippur War.

== Education ==
Military engineers can come from a variety of engineering programs. They may be graduates of mechanical, electrical, civil, or industrial engineering.

Military engineers may study in a military school or program, or graduate from a traditional university or college with an Bachelors of Science or Masters of Science engineering degree and take on work under the military directly or private military contractors.

The original colleges for military engineers were the Royal Military Academy Woolwich and the East India Company Seminary at Addiscombe. These courses were based on theory and practice in an academic environment, an early framework of modern engineering education. In Great Britain and India, engineering education was under the management of officers from the Royal Engineers and Indian Army. In India, the college branch of civil engineering supplied civil engineers for the Indian Public Works Department, although a civilian organization, they relied on military engineers until 1947.

=== Military academy ===
Military academies are educational institutions that prepare candidates for service in the officer corps, often in a military environment. These institutions are both pre-collegiate or collegiate. In collegiate institutions in the United States students can have a major field of study and graduate with a bachelors degree.

The coursework for traditional university engineering degrees and military engineering training are not identical. University standards for coursework address a wider range of topics that follow academic standards of study, innovation, theory. In comparison to military training focused on the applied practice.

=== Post service education ===
When considering veteran education post service seeking a bachelors of science in engineering, there is a gap of coursework veterans must complete to reach collegiate standards indicating they are not interchangeable. However, pursuing an engineering degree post service as a veteran offers a pathway to apply their experience towards their degree.

== Sub-discipline ==
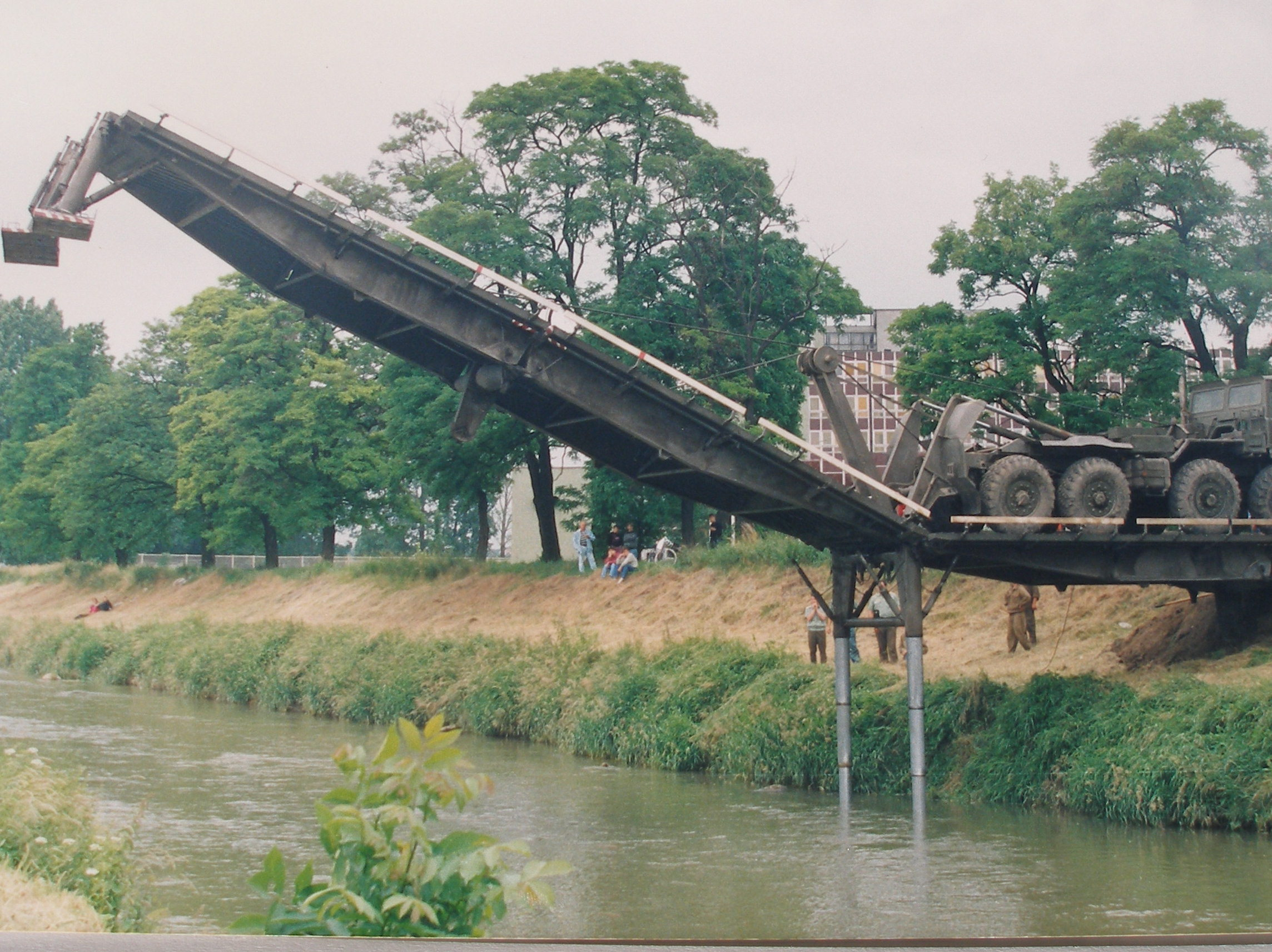
Slovak AM 50 laying a bridge over the Torysa river

Modern military engineering can be divided into three main tasks or fields: combat engineering, strategic support, and ancillary support. Combat engineering is associated with engineering on the battlefield. Combat engineers are responsible for increasing mobility on the front lines of war such as digging trenches and building temporary facilities in war zones. Strategic support is associated with providing service in communication zones such as the construction of airfields and the improvement and upgrade of ports, roads and railways communication. Ancillary support includes provision and distribution of maps as well as the disposal of unexploded warheads. Military engineers construct bases, airfields, roads, bridges, ports, and hospitals. During peacetime before modern warfare, military engineers took the role of civil engineers by participating in the construction of civil-works projects. Nowadays, military engineers are almost entirely engaged in war logistics and preparedness.

== Explosives engineering ==
Explosives are defined as any system that produces rapidly expanding gases in a given volume in a short duration. Specific military engineering occupations also extend to the field of explosives and demolitions and their usage on the battlefield. Explosive devices have been used on the battlefield for several centuries, in numerous operations from combat to area clearance. Earliest known development of explosives can be traced back to 10th-century China where the Chinese are credited with engineering the world's first known explosive, black powder. Initially developed for recreational purposes, black powder later was utilized for military application in bombs and projectile propulsion in firearms. Engineers in the military who specialize in this field formulate and design many explosive devices to use in varying operating conditions. Such explosive compounds range from black powder to modern plastic explosives. This particular is commonly listed under the role of combat engineers who demolitions expertise also includes mine and IED detection and disposal. For more information, see bomb disposal.

== Military engineering by country ==
Military engineers are key in all armed forces of the world, and invariably found either closely integrated into the force structure, or even into the combat units of the national troops.

=== Brazil ===
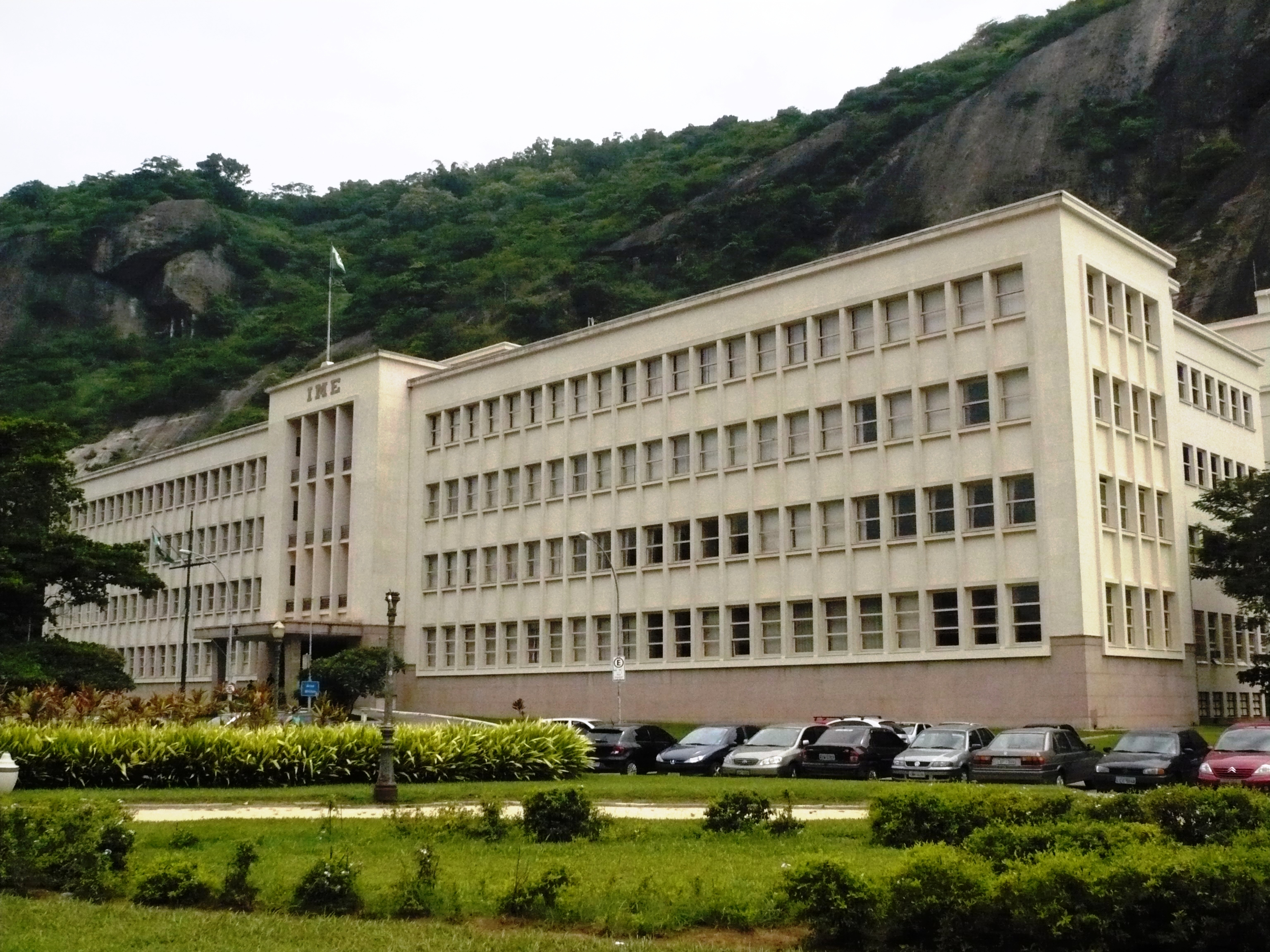
Instituto Militar de Engenharia, Rio de Janeiro - RJ

Brazilian Army engineers can be part of the Quadro de Engenheiros Militares, with its members trained or professionalized by the traditional Instituto Militar de Engenharia (IME) (Military Institute of Engineering), or the Arma de Engenharia, with its members trained by the Academia Militar das Agulhas Negras (AMAN) (Agulhas Negras Military Academy).

In the Brazil's Navy, engineers can occupy the Corpo de Engenheiros da Marinha, the Quadro Complementar de Oficiais da Armada and the Quadro Complementar de Oficiais Fuzileiros Navais. Officers can come from the Centro de Instrução Almirante Wandenkolk (CIAW) (Admiral Wandenkolk Instruction Center) and the Escola Naval (EN) (Naval School) which, through internal selection of the Navy, finish their graduation at the Universidade de São Paulo (USP) (University of São Paulo).

The Quadro de Oficias Engenheiros of the Brazilian Air Force is occupied by engineers professionalized by Centro de Instrução e Adaptação da Aeronáutica (CIAAR) (Air Force Instruction and Adaptation Center) and trained, or specialized, by Instituto Tecnológico de Aeronáutica (ITA) (Aeronautics Institute of Technology).

=== Russia ===
- Russian Empire – Pososhniye lyudi
- Soviet Union – Engineer Troops (Soviet Union); Assault Engineering Brigades
- Russia – Russian Engineer Troops

=== United Kingdom ===
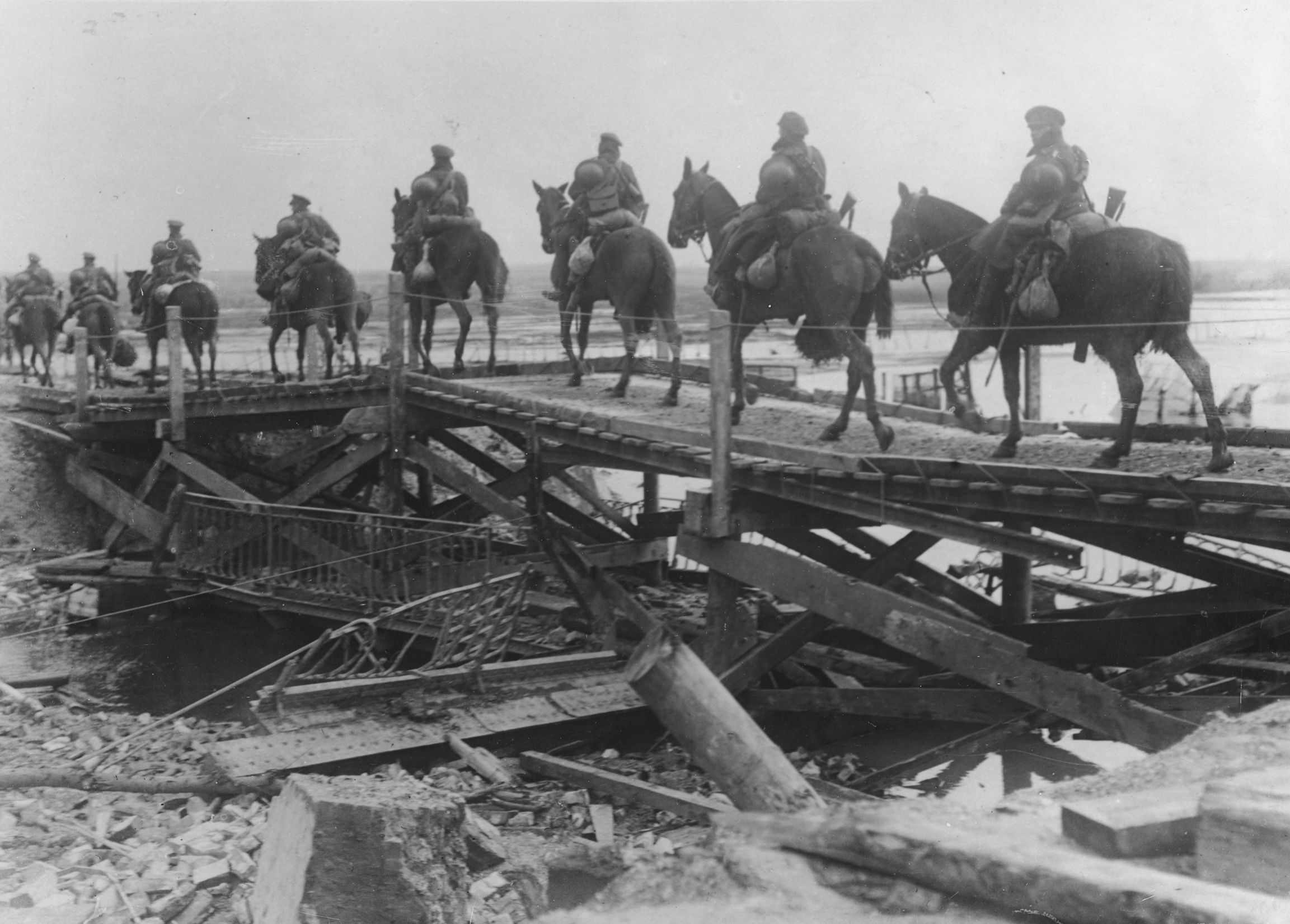
Cavalry crossing the river Somme on a makeshift bridge erected by the Royal Engineers during World War I

The Royal School of Military Engineering is the main training establishment for the British Army's Royal Engineers. The RSME also provides training for the Royal Navy, Royal Air Force, other Arms and Services of the British Army, Other Government Departments, and Foreign and Commonwealth countries as required. These skills provide vital components in the Army's operational capability, and Royal Engineers are currently deployed in Afghanistan, Iraq, Cyprus, Bosnia, Kosovo, Kenya, Brunei, Falklands, Belize, Germany and Northern Ireland. Royal Engineers also take part in exercises in Saudi Arabia, Kuwait, Italy, Egypt, Jordan, Canada, Poland and the United States.

=== United States ===
The prevalence of military engineering in the United States dates back to the American Revolutionary War when engineers would carry out tasks in the U.S. Army. During the war, they would map terrain to and build fortifications to protect troops from opposing forces. The first military engineering organization in the United States was the Army Corps of Engineers. Engineers were responsible for protecting military troops whether using fortifications or designing new technology and weaponry throughout the United States' history of warfare. The Army originally claimed engineers exclusively, but as the U.S. military branches expanded to the sea and sky, the need for military engineering sects in all branches increased. As each branch of the United States military expanded, technology adapted to fit their respective needs.

- United States Army Corps of Engineers
- Air Force Civil Engineer Support Agency, Rapid Engineer Deployable Heavy Operational Repair Squadron Engineers (RED HORSE), and Prime Base Engineer Emergency Force (Prime BEEF)
- The United States Navy Construction Battalion Corps (better known as the Seabees) and Civil Engineer Corps
- United States Marine Corps Combat Engineer Battalions

The United States military offers internships, part time, and full-time employment to civilians with or pursuing B.S. engineering degrees. These civilian engineers work on local or national projects under government, primarily under the army, navy, and air force.

==== Employment ====
===== Army employment =====
The Army offers several job titles in mechanics and engineering. Diver, Carpentry and Masonry Specialist, Plumber, Technical Engineer, Engineer Officer, Interior Electrician, Quarrying Specialist, Bridge Crewmember, Combat Engineer, Quarrying Specialist, Geospatial Engineer, Power Distribution Specialist, Special Forces Engineer Sergeant, Horizontal Construction Engineer, Prime Power Production Specialist, Wheeled Vehicle Mechanic, Small Arms/Towed Artillery Repairer, Watercraft Engineer, Allied Trade Specialist, M1 Abrams Tank System Maintainer, Tactical Power Generation Specialist, Track Vehicle Repairer, Bradley Fighting Vehicle System Maintainer, Construction Equipment Repairer, Self Propelled Artillery Systems Mechanic, Test Measurement and Diagnostic Equipment Maintenance Support Specialist, Multiple Launch Rocket System Repairer, Short Range Air Defense System Repairer, Land Combat Electronic Missile System Repairer, Stryker Systems Maintainer, Patriot Systems Repairer, Automated Test Set Operator Maintainer, and Quartermaster And Chemical Equipment Repairer. The army offers many of these to be entry level jobs out of high school and offer training and certifications under your service to acquire the skills.

The Army civilian acquired skilled program (ACASP) allow civilian individuals with prior skills and certifications to bypass portions of training and begin military careers at advanced levels. This includes technical trades and electronic maintenance, as well as healthcare disciplines.

===== Navy employment =====
The Navy separates mechanical, electronic, and engineering careers into separate categories: science, engineering, and nuclear. The primary career focus is new technology implementation. These jobs include but are not limited to Civil Engineer Corps, Naval Reactors Engineer, and Engineering Duty Officer.

They offer educational programs like the Civil Engineer Collegiate program, NROTC, and undergraduate and graduate professional programs to pair military training while finishing a college degree. The Civil Engineer Collegiate program allows aspiring Civil Engineer Corps officers to finish a college degree and prepare to work as an officer.

===== Air Force employment =====
The Air Force hires engineering specialists in five fields. Flight Engineering in aviation and flight, Civil Engineer in facilities construction, maintenance and support, Physicist/Nuclear Engineer in science and technology, Bioenvironmental Engineer in Healthcare, and Developmental Engineer in logistics and administration. These jobs focus on the safety and maintenance of facilities and vehicles, performing tests and evaluating danger to the force itself or surroundings.

===== Contractors =====
The United States military commonly outsources products and services from defense contractors. For products like airships, ships, vehicles, weaponry, electronic systems, or services like logistics, technical support, training, communication support, and engineering support, the military relies on engineers hired by these outside organizations. These engineers are not directly under the military but work on military funded projects. Other countries including the UK, Russia, and China also house large contractors, but the largest contractors (Lockheed Martin, RTX Corporation, Northrop Grumman, Boeing, and General Dynamics) are all in the United States.

=== Other nations ===
- Department of the Engineer Troops of the Armed Forces of Armenia
- (Australia) Royal Australian Engineers and the Royal Australian Air Force Airfield Engineers
- Corps of Engineers and Military Engineer Services (MES), Bangladesh Army
- (Canada) Canadian Military Engineers
- (Denmark) The Danish military engineering corps is almost entirely organized into one regiment, simply named "Ingeniørregimentet" ("The Engineering Regiment").
- (Germany) Pioniertruppe (Bundeswehr)
- (France) Engineering Arm, including the Paris Fire Brigade
- (India) Indian Army Corps of Engineers
- (Indonesia) Indonesian Army Corps of Engineers
- (Republic of Ireland) Irish Army Engineer Corps
- Combat Engineering Corps of the Israel Defense Forces
- Engineer Regiment (Namibia)
- (Netherlands) Regiment Genietroepen consisting of training and expertise centers, three battalions and a company embedded in the Dutch combat brigades and the operational support command.
- Corps of Royal New Zealand Engineers
- (Norway) Ingeniørbataljonen ("The Engineer Battalion")
- (Malaysia) Rejimen Askar Jurutera DiRaja ("Royal Engineer Regiment")
- Pakistan Army Corps of Engineers and the Military Engineering Service
- (Romania) 10th Engineer Brigade
- (South Africa) South African Army Engineer Formation
- Sri Lanka Engineers and the Engineer Services Regiment
- (Vietnam) The Le Quy Don Technical University is the main training establishment for the Vietnamese Army's Corps of Engineers
- (Finland) Engineers are a service branch of the Finnish Army

== See also ==
=== Related topics ===
- Bailey bridge
- Fortification
- History of warfare
- Military bridges
- Military engineering vehicles
- Military technology and equipment
- Siege engine

=== Notable military engineers ===
- Mozi
- Gundulf of Rochester
- Henri Alexis Brialmont
- John Chard
- Menno van Coehoorn
- Pierre Charles L'Enfant
- Giovanni Fontana
- Leslie Groves
- Cyril Gordon Martin
- Coulson Norman Mitchell
- John Rosworm
- Charles Pasley
- Vauban
- Marc René, marquis de Montalembert
- Charles George Gordon
- Francis Fowke
- Paul R. Smith
- Vitruvius
- Eugénio dos Santos
- Tadeusz Kościuszko
- Leonardo da Vinci
- Robert E. Lee
- Herman Haupt
- Douglas MacArthur
- George Washington
- Fritz Todt
