= Monument to Richard Sorge =

Monument in Baku, Azerbaijan

- Azerbaijani: Rixard Zorgenin abidəsi
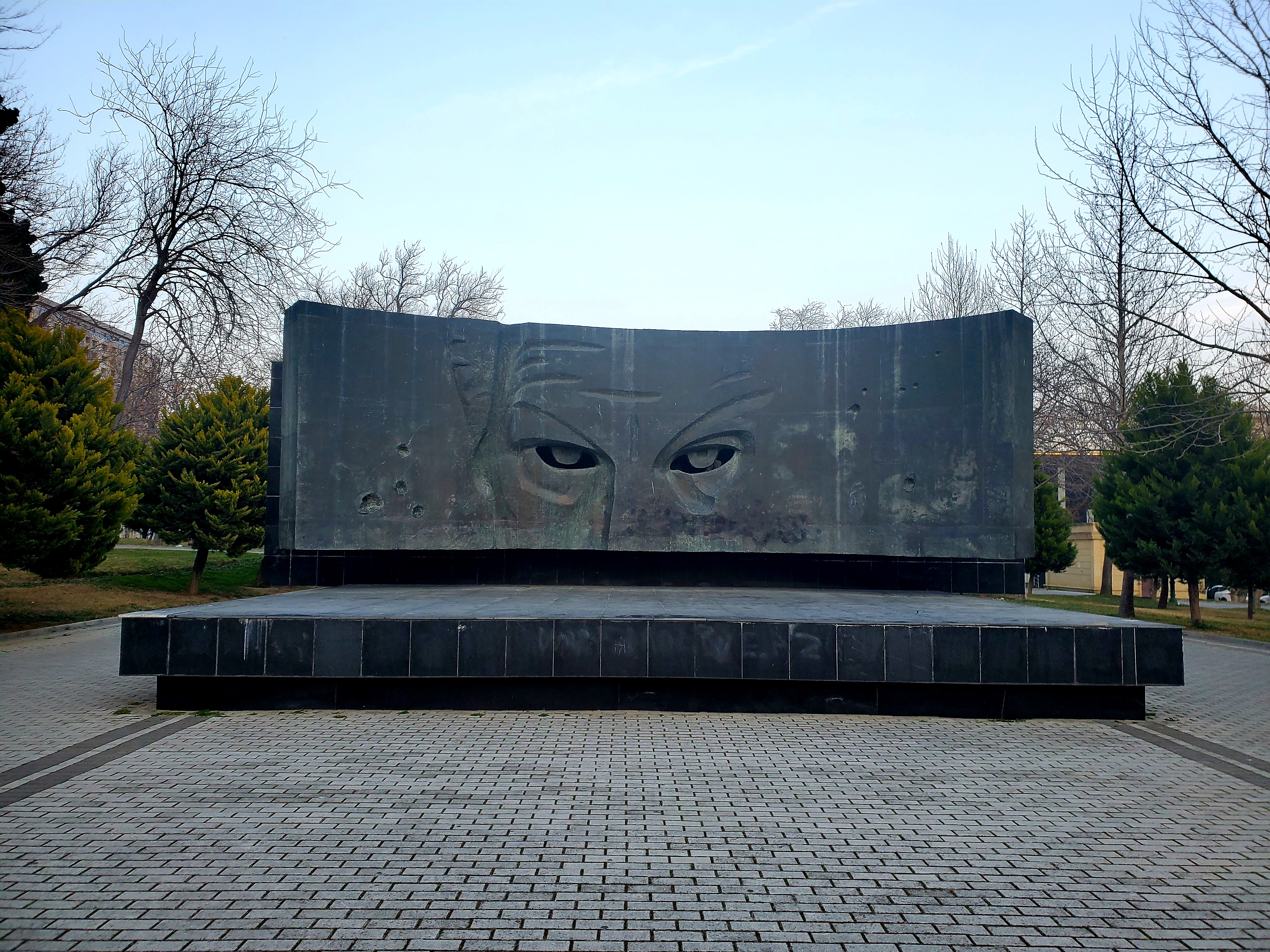
- Interactive map of Monument to Richard Sorge
- Location: Baku, Azerbaijan
- Designer: Vladimir Tsigal
- Type: Memorial
- Opening date: May 1981
- Dedicated to: Richard Sorge

The Monument to Richard Sorge (Azerbaijani: Rixard Zorgenin abidəsi) - is a monument to Hero of the Soviet Union Richard Sorge, a Soviet intelligence officer during the Second World War. The monument is located in Baku, the capital of Azerbaijan, near the village of Sabunchu, where Sorge was born. It was installed in 1981. The sculptor is Vladimir Tsigal, the architects are Rasim Aliev, Leonid Pavlov, Y. Dubov.

The monument was unveiled in May 1981 on the eve of the Victory Day, in one of the alleys of the city (currently in the park named after Richard Sorge). The bronze and granite monument is framed by pines, plane trees, and mulberry trees, and nearby, in land brought from Japan, a cherry tree.

The sculptor Vladimir Tsigal said:

For many years I have dreamed of creating a monument to the legendary Soviet intelligence officer, the commander of a group operating deep behind enemy lines, R. Sorge. I visited Japan, and talked for a long time with people who knew him. The collected materials and impressions helped the team of authors create a monument to Sorge for Baku – his homeland, and finally with the architect L. Pavlov, we completed a long-term work for a monument to a wonderful patriot.

The monument to Richard Sorge is made in the form of an oblong, curved bronze plaque, reminiscent of a radar installation, in the centre of which there is a relief image of the middle part of Sorge's face with the cut right through the stone eyes which depicts his piercing gaze – focused and studying shrilling the person. In this generalized, conventional image, the sculptor tried to create a symbol of the Soviet intelligence officer.

A photograph of the monument illustrated an article about Tsigal in the Azerbaijan Soviet Encyclopedia.
