= Sapper army =

Type of Red Army engineer formation during WW2

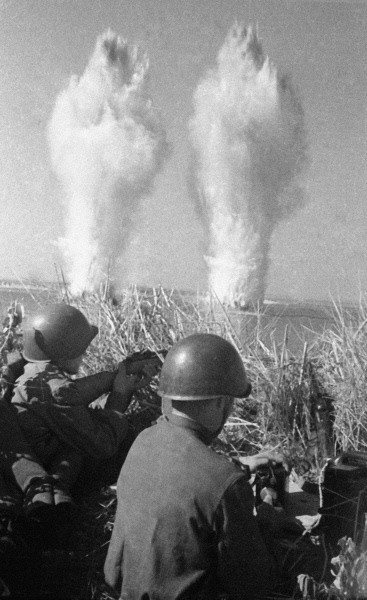
Sappers detonate mines found in Bulgarian waters during the 1941-1945 Great Patriotic War.

A Sapper Army (Russian: сапёрная армия) was a multi-brigade military construction engineer formation of the Engineer Troops (Soviet Union) of the Soviet Red Army during World War II. Formed to construct large-scale defensive works, sapper armies were used from late 1941 until mid-1942 when the Red Army opted to organize smaller and more flexible construction engineer formations. Although the organization of military construction engineers into an army-level echelon was unusual, the use of dedicated troops for military construction was common to many armies of World War II.

== History ==
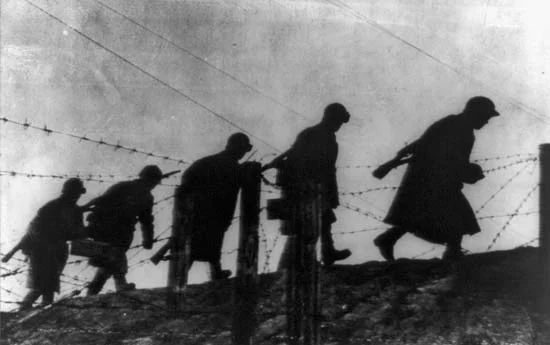
Soviet Red Army sappers cross fortifications in the Siege of Leningrad, c. 1941-1943

Reeling from the German invasion of 1941, the Soviets decided to organize large military construction engineer formations to construct defensive works on a massive scale. The Soviets hoped such works would strengthen Red Army defensive operations and buy enough time to rebuild their forces for a counter-offensive.

Consequently, the high command ordered the formation of the first sapper armies on October 13, 1941. Originally, six sapper armies were formed, but by December 1941 this was expanded to ten sapper armies, numbered First through Tenth. The sapper armies were not only composed of military personnel; "women, old men, schoolchildren and teenagers under the draft age" were also mobilized to serve in the construction units.

The sapper armies worked to construct defensive lines that were made up of battalion and company strong points in the Moscow, Stalingrad, North Caucasus, and Volga military districts. Sapper armies also trained troops for the Red Army's engineers and consequently suffered a steady loss of qualified personnel.

Dissatisfied with the relative lack of flexibility of the sapper armies, the high command disbanded five of them in February 1942 and used the released personnel for the formation of new rifle (infantry) units. Confronted with the German summer offensive of 1942, the remaining sapper armies built defensive works around Moscow and Stalingrad, and in the Caucasus. On July 26, 1942, the high command directed the reorganization of the sapper armies, and by October 1942, the remaining five sapper armies had been converted into defensive construction directorates. The troops released by this measure were used to form new rifle and smaller engineer units.

Historian David Glantz assessed the effectiveness of the sapper armies as having "... contributed significantly to the Red Army's victories at Leningrad, Moscow, and Stalingrad by preparing defensive lines, providing vital engineering support to the Red Army's operating fronts, and serving as a base for the formation of other more specialized engineer forces assigned to operating fronts."

== Organization ==
Sapper armies were made up of two to four sapper brigades. A sapper brigade controlled 19 sapper battalions, each with three companies of four platoons. Sapper battalions had an authorized strength of 497 men, and included woodcutting units, road- and bridge-building units, units dedicated to the construction of defensive positions, and motorized tractor units. Fully manned, each sapper army was authorized some 45,000 to 50,000 men.

== Deployment ==
- 1st Sapper Army. Assigned to Western Front from December 1941 until September 1942. A 19 November 1941 NKO order downsized the planned formation of a 1st Sapper Army to work on fortifications in Karelia to the 1st Separate Operational-Engineer Group. On 21 December 1941, the Chief of Engineers of the Western Front, Maj. Gen. M. P. Vorob'ev, requested the NKO to form another 1st Sapper Army to exercise more command and control over the 80 separate sapper battalions on defence line construction west of Moscow. The army consisted of ten sapper brigades with eight sapper battalions each.
- 2nd Sapper Army. Assigned to Arkhangelsk Military District (MD) from October 1941 until February 1942.
- 3rd Sapper Army. Assigned to Moscow MD from October 1941 until September 1942.
- 4th Sapper Army. Assigned to Volga MD from October 1941 until May 1942.
- 5th Sapper Army. Assigned to Stalingrad and North Caucasus MD's from October 1941 until March 1942.
- 6th Sapper Army. Assigned to Volga MD and the Bryansk Front from October 1941 until September 1942.
- 7th Sapper Army. Assigned to Volga and Stalingrad MD's from October 1941 until September 1942.
- 8th Sapper Army. Assigned to North Caucasus MD and the Southern, Caucasus, and Trans-Caucasus Fronts from October 1941 until October 1942.
- 9th Sapper Army. Assigned to North Caucasus MD from October 1941 until March 1942.
- 10th Sapper Army. Assigned to North Caucasus MD from October 1941 until March 1942.
- 11th Sapper Army. Assigned to Leningrad MD from September 1942 until July 1944.

== Sources ==
- Glantz, David (2005). Colossus Reborn. Lawrence: University of Press of Kansas. ISBN 0-7006-1353-6.
