= Assault Engineering Brigades =

Russian Red Army units during WWII

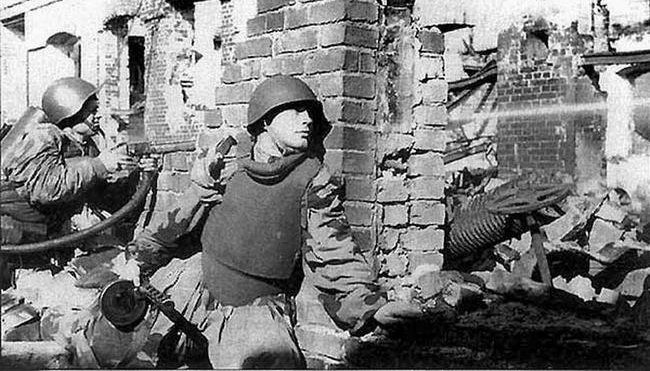
Red Army assault engineer-sappers during street fighting in 1942, wearing distinctive SN-42 steel armor.

Assault Engineering Brigades (Russian: штурмовая инженерно-сапёрная бригада) or Storm Engineer-Sapper Brigades were formations of the Reserve of the Supreme High Command of the Red Army, being notable for their service during the Second World War. These brigades were designed to storm settlements and to break through heavily fortified enemy lines. These units are commonly abbreviated as ShISBr (Russian: шисбр), and are occasionally referred to as "armoured infantry" or "cuirass infantry" (Russian: панцирная пехота).

== History ==
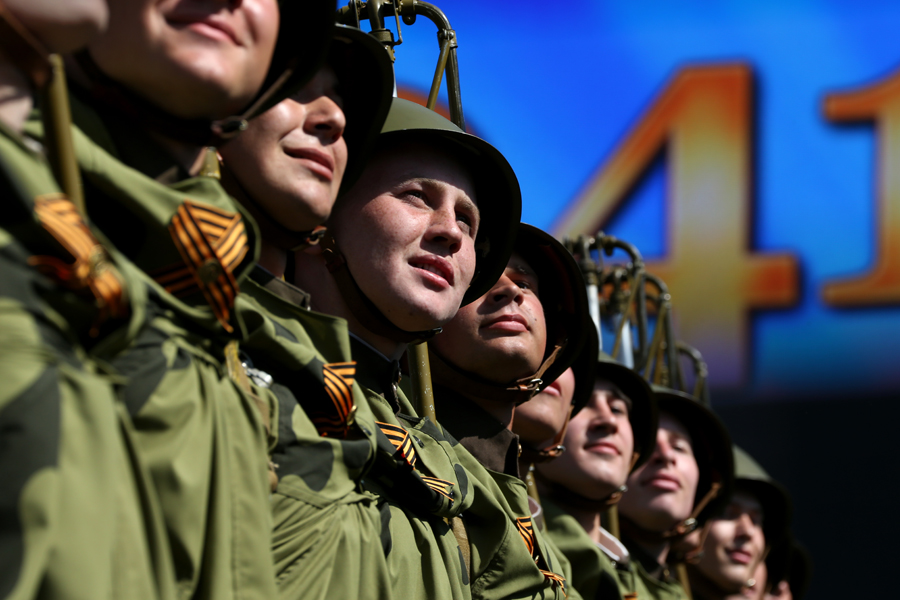
Historical reenactors dressed in uniforms of engineering troops during the 2015 Moscow Victory Day Parade.

Sapper-engineering assault units were formed in 1943. By 30 May of that year, the formation of the first 15 brigades was completed. Most of these units were formed from existing combat battalions, well-proven in battle. In August 1943, assault engineer-sapper brigades arrived at the front. These were each composed of:

- Brigade Command (40 people)
- Command Company (87 people)
- Motorized Engineer-Scout Company (101 people)
- 5 Assault Engineer-Sapper Battalions (388 people each)
- Light Bridging and Crossing Equipment Crew (36 people)

During the formations of assault engineering brigades, all soldiers over 40 years of age were reassigned. The most distinctive piece of individual equipment used by soldiers of the assault engineering brigades was the SN-42 (Russian: СН-42) steel breastplate.

In December 1943, a procedure was developed for the combat utilization of assault formations. Assault brigades were sent into battle to facilitate key breakthroughs in fortified defensive lines by means of combat engineering and sapping. Success in battle hinged on close coordination with infantry, armoured, mechanized, and artillery units. As soldiers of the assault brigades were not equipped with heavy small arms or their own artillery, they were immediately withdrawn after a successful breakthrough in the enemy lines to limit casualties.

In the spring of 1944 the assault engineering brigades were supplied with ROKS-3 flamethrowers. The 1st, 2nd, 4th, 10th, and 2nd Guards assault engineer-sapper brigades were supplemented with engineer-tank regiments including PT-3 (Russian: ПТ-3) mine flails and OT-34 flamethrower tanks, each composed of three companies with 20 combat vehicles per company.

By May 1945, the brigades pushed through the city of Königsberg (now Kaliningrad), with the city falling in a matter of days.

Over the course of the Second World War 20 assault engineer-sapper brigades were formed, performing admirably in combat operations, and especially distinguishing themselves in the storming of cities, which was their intended purpose.

== Legacy ==
Combat engineers are one of the branches of the Red Army that are given special reverence. In 2015 and 2020, a formation of soldiers dressed in the uniforms of engineer assault brigades took part in the Moscow Victory Day Parade on Red Square. During a national ceremony at the Capul de pod Șerpeni Memorial Complex in August 2019, Russian Defence Minister Sergey Shoigu ceremonially handed to Moldovan Defence Minister Pavel Voicu the military banners of the 14th Assault Engineering and Combat Brigade, which until that point, was kept at the Central Armed Forces Museum in Russia.

== Structure ==
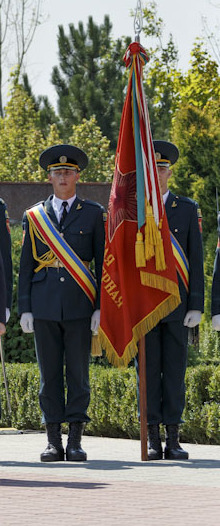
A Moldovan National Army soldier holding the banner of the 14th Assault Engineering and Combat Engineer Brigade.

- 1st Guards Assault Engineering Sapper Brigade
- 1st Assault Engineering and Sapper Brigade
- 2nd Assault Engineering and Combat Engineer Brigade
- 3rd Assault Engineering and Combat Engineer Brigade
- 4th Assault Engineering and Sapper Brigade
- 5th Assault Engineering and Combat Engineer Brigade
- 6th Assault Engineering and Combat Engineer Brigade
- 7th Assault Engineering and Sapper Brigade
- 8th Assault Engineering and Sapper Brigade
- 9th Assault Engineering and Combat Engineer Brigade
- 10th Assault Engineering and Combat Engineer Brigade
- 11th Assault Engineering and Sapper Brigade
- 12th Assault Engineering and Combat Engineer Brigade
- 13th Assault Engineering and Combat Engineer Brigade
- 14th Assault Engineering and Combat Engineer Brigade
- 15th Assault Engineering and Combat Engineer Brigade
- 16th Assault Engineering and Combat Engineer Brigade
- 17th Assault Engineering and Combat Engineer Brigade
- 18th Assault Engineering and Sapper Brigade
- 19th Assault Engineering and Sapper Brigade

== See also ==
- Sapper army
