= Habermas (surname) =

Habermas (UK: /ˈhɑːbərmæs/ HAH-bər-mass, US: /-mɑːs/ -mahss; German: [ˈhaːbɐmaːs]) is a German surname. Notable people with the surname include:

- Ernst Habermas (1891–1972), German manager
- Friedrich Habermas (1860–1911), German theologian
- Gary Habermas (born 1950), American philosophical theologian
- Jürgen Habermas (1929–2026), German sociologist and philosopher
- Rebekka Habermas (1959–2023), German historian
- Tilmann Habermas (born 1956), German psychoanalyst

== See also ==
- 59390 Habermas, a minor planet
