= Ideal speech situation =

Philosophy of language concept

An ideal speech situation was a term introduced in the early philosophy of Jürgen Habermas. It argues that an ideal speech situation is found when communication between individuals is governed by basic, implied rules. In an ideal speech situation, participants would be able to evaluate each other’s assertions solely on the basis of reason and evidence in an atmosphere completely free of any nonrational “coercive” influences, including both physical and psychological coercion. Furthermore, all participants would be motivated solely by the desire to obtain a rational consensus.

== Doctrines ==
Members of the public sphere must adhere to certain rules for an "ideal speech situation" to occur. They are:

1. Every subject with the competence to speak and act is allowed to take part in a discourse.

2a. Everyone is allowed to question any assertion whatever.

2b. Everyone is allowed to introduce any assertion whatever into the discourse.

2c. Everyone is allowed to express their attitudes, desires and needs without any hesitation.

3. No speaker may be prevented, by internal or external coercion, from exercising his rights as laid down in (1) and (2)

The concept of the ideal speech situation came under attack in the 1970s by theorists who persistently relativized the concept, arguing that any particular conception of an ideal speech situation could not be proven completely correct, so that any (still-unknown) gaps could allow associated oppressions to arise or persist.

Habermas responded to this in 1983 with Moral Consciousness and Communicative Action (English trans. 1990). In this work he no longer spoke of a known ideal speech situation but instead of a new moral system ("Discourse ethics") that could be derived from the "presuppositions of argumentation". These, in turn, could initially be postulated by philosophical analysis in the same way that Immanuel Kant tried to justify his own moral system through transcendental arguments. However, unlike Kant, Habermas recognizes that the presuppositions of argumentation can be tested in practice by a device he terms "performative contradiction". If critics object to the presuppositions of argumentation, their argument might be turned on them to demonstrate that their argument has already granted the existence of whatever specific presupposition of argument they object to. However, if such a performative contradiction cannot be found, then the presuppositions of argumentation must be revised to take account of the criticism and the moral system derived from these presuppositions altered accordingly. In other words, "performative contradiction" is not a trump card to dismiss all objections but a fair test of those objections. The dialectical nature of Habermas's argument often goes unrecognized.

== Use in pragmatics and speech-act analysis ==
The ideal speech situation, in its assumption of literal rather than figurative language function (language "below" rather than "above" the context-forming horizon of the lifeworld), is taken as the model for formal pragmatic analysis of speech-acts.

== See also ==
- The Theory of Communicative Action
