= Giovanna Borradori =

Italian philosopher

Giovanna Borradori is Professor of Philosophy and Media Studies at Vassar College. Borradori is a specialist in Social and political theory, Aesthetics, and the philosophy of terrorism. A crucial focus of her work is fostering new avenues of communication between rival philosophical lineages, including the analytical and Continental traditions, liberalism and communitarianism, as well as deconstruction and Critical Theory.

== Writings ==
In her anthology, Recoding Metaphysics: The New Italian Philosophy, Borradori presented late 20th-century Italian thinkers, such as Gianni Vattimo, Massimo Cacciari, Mario Perniola, and Emanuele Severino, to the American audience. In The American Philosopher: Conversations with Quine, Davidson, Putnam, Nozick, Danto, Rorty, Cavell, MacIntyre, Kuhn, she pressed her interlocutors to reflect on their relation to history, the weight of tradition in philosophy, and their encounters with pragmatism and logical positivism. The American Philosopher was one of the first critical examinations of the historical and institutional context in which contemporary American philosophy operates.

After the terrorist attacks of September 11, 2001, Borradori became a strong voice in the study of terrorism from a philosophical perspective. Her 2003 book, Philosophy in a Time of Terror: Dialogues with Jürgen Habermas and Jacques Derrida, seeks to evaluate the full philosophical and political significance of 9/11 in conversation with two important European thinkers. Overcoming their historical enmity, Habermas and Derrida appear in her book side by side for the first time in their lives. Borradori's book opened the way for their critical collaboration on the public sphere, which continued with a declaration of support for the anti-war demonstrations of February 15, 2003. Entitled, "February 15, or, What Binds Europeans Together: Plea for a Common Foreign Policy, Beginning in Core Europe," their joint statement appeared simultaneously in major European newspapers and was later published in "Old Europe, New Europe, Core Europe" (Verso, 2005).

In Philosophy in a Time of Terror, Borradori asserts that militant religious fundamentalists explicitly reject secularization and modernity, which constitute the conceptual foundations of the Enlightenment. This leads Borradori to claim that an appropriate response to 9/11 must reach "as far as a critical reassessment of the validity of the Enlightenment project" (10).

Habermas and Derrida discuss their different interpretations of Kant's legacy, both agreeing, however, with the crux of his political philosophy: the legitimacy of international legal and political institutions as a condition for global justice.

== Bibliography ==
- Il Pensiero Post-Filosofico. Milan: Jaca Books, 1988
- Recoding Metaphysics: The New Italian Philosophy, edited by. Evanston, IL: Northwestern University Press, 1988
- The American Philosopher: Conversations with Quine, Davidson, Putnam, Nozick, Danto, Rorty, Cavell, MacIntyre, Kuhn. Chicago, IL: University of Chicago, 1994
- Philosophy in a Time of Terror: Dialogues with Jürgen Habermas and Jacques Derrida. Chicago, IL: University of Chicago Press, 2003
