= A Berlin Republic =

1997 book by Jürgen Habermas

- Cover of the German edition
- Author: Jürgen Habermas
- Language: German
- Subject: German nationalism
- Published: 1997
- Publication place: Germany
- Media type: Print

A Berlin Republic (German: Die Normalität einer Berliner Republik. Kleine Politische Schriften VIII) is a 1997 book composed of a collection of transcripts of interviews with the German philosopher and social critic Jürgen Habermas conducted by various European media in the mid-1990s. The common thread of the interviews is Habermas's disagreement with resurgent German nationalism after the reunification with the former German Democratic Republic (GDR).

Habermas's theoretical works are in the background of the interviews. At the time of the interviews, in the early 1990s, Habermas was publishing Between Facts and Norms, his philosophy of law and politics, and writing the political-philosophical essays which would later be collected in the volumes published in English as Justification and Application and The Inclusion of the Other.

In A Berlin Republic, Habermas wages an intellectual campaign in Germany's political public sphere against what he sees as the backward-looking influence of German political theorist and proponent of Nazism, Carl Schmitt, and the philosopher Martin Heidegger. Schmitt advocated a "normalizing" view of German history, whereby Communism and Nazism would be equated, and the continuity of a reunified Germany with her pre-1945 past would be affirmed. Habermas encourages Germans to think differently about 1945 and 1989. In Habermas's view, Germany must reject any thought of basing her reunified future on a continuation of notions such as German ethnic identity as a foundation for the German state, Germany as a potential political and military power in central Europe, an "eastern-oriented" foreign policy, and the notion of a "special path" (Sonderweg) for Germany separate from that of other Western democracies.

The rationale Habermas gives is initially historical—if Germans face squarely their past, they cannot wish for any continuity with it that does not own it as tragic and catastrophic. This harks back to his earliest writings of the 1950s, collected in Philosophical-Political Profiles, in which he sees the only way forward for a German philosophy is to remember the German-Jewish philosophy that was obliterated in the Holocaust.

Beyond this, however, are two considerations that for Habermas loom larger. The first concerns the process of globalization, in all its forms: worldwide communications, transnational corporations, systemic impacts of human activity on the natural environment, unprecedented immigration, dramatic improvements in transportation and communication technologies, and international organizations. Habermas agrees with British theoretical sociologist Anthony Giddens that globalization transforms the nature of politics and community. Although the nation-state was, in the 18th and 19th centuries an appropriate location and scale for the development of an emancipated political public sphere, by the aftermath of World War II this was no longer the case. As problems are global their solutions be as well. Therefore, only a global scale of decision-making is appropriate, and the foreign affairs of nations must all be seen as the domestic affairs of the global community. Based on his theoretical notion of societal legitimacy coming only from the active, ongoing consent of the people, Habermas shows how his notion of a political public sphere provides, by means of the deliberative agreements developed in radical liberal democracy, a way for people who formerly considered themselves strangers can come to see themselves as having a common self-interest at a larger social scale than they had previously imagined.

The second larger consideration for Habermas is the supplanting of what he calls "constitutional patriotism" for ethnic nationalism as the substantial glue holding a diverse, pluralistic society together. In a "postmetaphysical" age, worldview pluralism means that people cannot base agreements at a political level on particular religious values. Similarly, in an age of immigration and retreating racism, it is no longer appropriate to build political consensus in the state primarily upon one culture's values over another's. Consequently, the only way forward is to expand the emancipatory potential already present even in culturally- or religiously-grounded democratic institutions—namely, that people come by practice to see that their own interests are best safeguarded in procedural systems of law and politics that systematically protect the interests of all equally. A dedication to such a political-legal system is what Habermas means by "constitutional patriotism," as elaborated particularly in the essays later published as The Postnational Constellation.
