= Hans-Herbert Kögler =

German-American philosopher

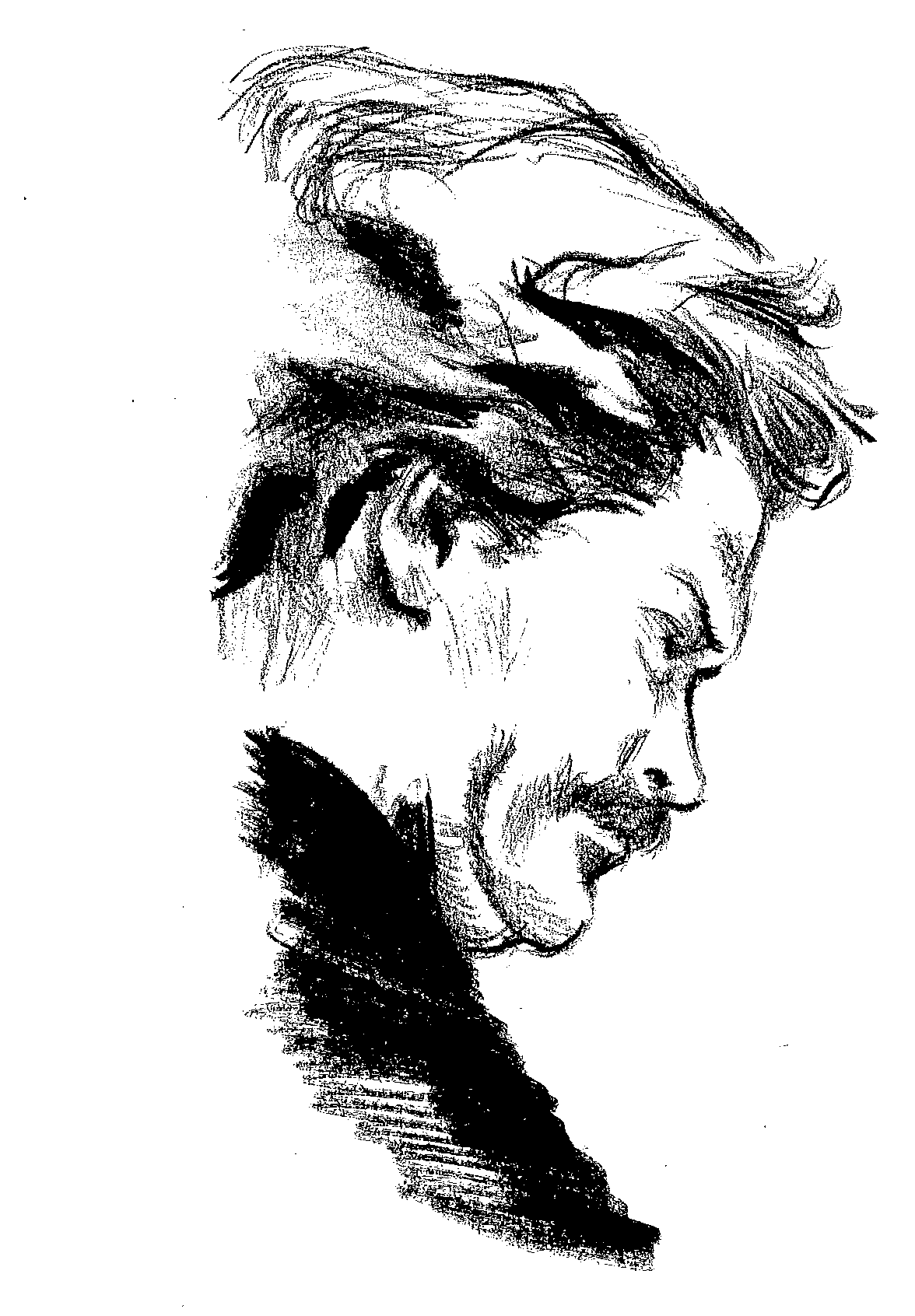
- Born: 13 January 1960 (age 66); Darmstadt, West Germany

Education
- Education: Goethe University Frankfurt
- Thesis: Die Macht des Dialogs. Kritische Hermeneutik nach Gadamer, Foucault und Rorty (1991)
- Doctoral advisor: Jürgen Habermas

Philosophical work
- Era: Contemporary philosophy
- Region: Western philosophy
- School: Social philosophy Hermeneutics
- Main interests: Hermeneutics
- Notable ideas: Dialogical cosmopolitanism

Hans-Herbert Kögler (born January 13, 1960) is a German-American philosopher.

== Biography ==
Kögler was born in Darmstadt in 1960. After finishing the Viktoriaschule in his home city, he studied philosophy, history of art, and sociology of education at the Goethe University Frankfurt. He received a German National Scholarship Foundation Fellowship for his doctoral studies, as well as a one-year award for study in the United States, visiting Thomas A. McCarthy at the Northwestern University, Richard J. Bernstein at The New School for Social Research, and Hubert Dreyfus at the University of California, Berkeley. He completed both his master's dissertation in 1986 and his doctoral dissertation in 1991 under the supervision of Jürgen Habermas in Frankfurt.

He returned to the US and began his teaching career in 1991—first as an assistant professor at the University of Illinois at Urbana-Champaign, then at the University of North Florida in Jacksonville. He received two National Endowment for the Humanities faculty fellowships (Boston University 1997, University of Arizona in Tucson 2000). In 2007/2008 he became the UNF Philosophy Department chair (until 2015) and full professor. He maintained academic contacts with Europe, in particular with the University of Klagenfurt in Austria, where he has taught as a visiting professor (2004; 2006, 2010, since 2014 regularly), and with Prague (visiting position 2003).

== Work ==
Kögler developed a 'critical hermeneutics' which received attention in the social sciences and social theory. The first paradigmatic formulation can be found in Die Macht des Dialogs (1992), whose American edition The Power of Dialogue (1996, 1999) received international attention.

Furthermore, Kögler articulated and developed his project in more than 80 journal articles and book chapters. Important developments include a 'dialogical cosmopolitanism' and the problem of agency. Kögler's cosmopolitanism integrates a context-sensitive comprehension, normative orientation to universal values and rules, and critical reflection of power relations. Kögler's theory of agency fuses hermeneutic and existential approaches with George Herbert Mead's theory of the self.

== Reception ==
Kögler made influential contributions to the philosophy of the social sciences, hermeneutics, and critical theory. His critical-hermeneutic approach is widely received in the Anglo-American as well as the global context. His impulses can be found among education theorists, psychologists, anthropologists, and social scientists generally, as well as in gender research and by feminist authors. Readers and former students reimported his views and impulses into European discussions, for instance in Norway, Denmark, Austria, Czech Republic, Slovakia, New Zealand, Canada, Brazil, and Italy, among others. The journal Social Epistemology devoted a special issue in 1997 to Kögler's critical analysis of Pierre Bourdieu's sociology. His critical engagement with Bourdieu continued.

== Jubilee workshop ==
In February 2020 a conference with more than 15 philosophers and sociologues from the United States, Europe and the United Arab Emirates honored Kögler with their contributions in a two days workshop Hermeneutics, Critique, and Dialogue.

== Bibliography ==
A full-length bibliography of his works published in English, German, French, Czech, Italian, and Russian, is available on the personal web site of the University of North Florida.

=== Monographes and edited works ===
- Die Macht des Dialogs: Kritische Hermeneutik nach Gadamer, Foucault und Rorty. Stuttgart, Metzler, 1992.
  - The Power of dialogue: Critical Hermeneutics after Gadamer and Foucault, transl. by Paul Hendrickson. Cambridge, Mass. 1996; 1999. (with a new final chapter: Critical Theory as Critical Hermeneutics).
- Empathy and Agency: The Problem of Understanding in the Human Sciences, Hans/Herbert Kögler/Karsten Stueber (eds.), Boulder, Colorado: Westview Press 2000.
- Michel Foucault. Stuttgart, Metzler, 1994; 2nd. rev. ed. Stuttgart-Weimar, Metzler, 2004.
- Kultura, Kritika, Dialog (Culture, Critique, Dialogue), Prague: Publishing House Filosofia, December 2006.
- Religion and the Public Sphere, with Jürgen Habermas, Charles Taylor, Alessandro Ferraro, Hans-Herbert Kögler, (ed. by O. Stech, Prague Academic Publishers, Fall 2017.
- Enigma Agency: Macht, Widerstand, Reflexivität, Hans-Herbert Kögler / Alice Pechriggl / Rainer Winter (eds.), Bielefeld, transcript, 2019 (Cultural Studies; 51).
- Reconceiving Religion in the Postsecular Public Sphere. Special issue of Berlin Journal of Critical Theory, vol. 4,2, July 2020.

=== Noted essays ===
- Fröhliche Subjektivität: Historische Ethik und dreifache Ontologie beim späten Foucault, Ethos der Moderne—Foucaults Kritik der Aufklärung, E. Erdmann, R. Forst, A. Honneth (eds), Frankfurt: Campus 1990) pp. 202–228.
- The self-empowered subject: Habermas, Foucault, and hermeneutic reflexivity, Philosophy & Social Criticism, vol. 22,4 (July 1996) pp. 13–44.
- Alienation as Epistemological Source: Reflexivity and Social Background after Mannheim and Bourdieu, target piece in a special issue New Directions in the Sociology of Knowledge, Social Epistemology vol. 11, 2, April—June 1997, pp. 141–164.
- Reconceptualizing Reflexive Sociology: A Reply. Special issue New Directions in the Sociology of Knowledge Social Epistemology vol. 11, no. 2, April—June 1997, pp. 223–250.
- Empathy, Dialogical Self, and Reflexive Interpretation: The Symbolic Source of Simulation Empathy and Agency: The Problem of Understanding in the Human Sciences, H.-H. Kögler/K. Stueber, (eds.), Boulder, Colorado: Westview Press 2000, pp. 194–221.
- Recognition and Difference: The Power of Perspectives in Interpretive Dialogue, in the special issue Dialogue as the Inscription of 'the West', Social Identities vol. 11,3, May 2005, ed. by C. Zene and A. Mandair, pp. 247–269.
- Constructing a Cosmopolitan Public Sphere: Hermeneutic Capabilities and Universal Values, European Journal of Social Theory vol. 8,3, 2005, pp. 297–320.
- Die Macht der Interpretation: Konturen einer kritischen Sozialwissenschaft in Anschluss an Foucault, concluding part 4 Macht Wissen Macht: Michel Foucault's Analytik der Macht und die Soziale Arbeit, Roland Anhorn, Frank Bettinger, Johannes Stehr (eds.). VS (Verlag der Sozialwissenschaften), Fall 2007, pp. 347–366.
- Critical Hermeneutics, Sage Encyclopedia of Qualitative Research Methods, Thousand Oaks, 2009, pp. 153–155.
- Consciousness as Symbolic Construction: A Semiotics of Thought after Cassirer, Constructivist Foundations vol. 4,3, July 2009, pp. 159–169.
- Being as Dialogue, or: The Ethical Consequences of Interpretation, The Consequences of Hermeneutics: Fifty years after Gadamer's Truth and method, J. Malpas/S. Zabala (eds.), Evanston: Northwestern U.P. 2010, pp. 343–367.
- Constructing a Cosmopolitan Public Sphere: Hermeneutic Capabilities and Universal Values, republished from European Journal of Social Theory, 2005, Cosmopolitanisms vol. 4: Contested Cosmopolitanisms, G. Delanty (ed.), Routledge 2010, pp. 297–320.
- Recognition and the Resurgence of Intentional Agency, Inquiry, special issue Rational Agency as Ethical Life, Taylor & Francis, vol. 52, Summer/Fall 2010, pp. 450–469.
- Hermeneutic Cosmopolitanism—or, Toward a Cosmopolitan Public Sphere Ashgate Research Companion to Cosmopolitanism, Ashgate Publishers, UK, 2011, pp. 225–242.
- Agency and the Other: On the Intersubjective Roots of Self-Identity. Special issue on 'Human Agency and Development,' New Ideas in Psychology (NIP), B. Sokol, J. Sugarman, (eds.), vol 30, April 2012, pp. 47–64.
- A Critique of Dialogue in Philosophical Hermeneutics, Journal of Dialogue Studies vol. 2,1 2014, pp. 47–68.
- Empathy, Dialogue, Critique: How should we understand (inter-)cultural violence? The Agon of Interpretations. Towards a Critical Intercultural Hermeneutics, Ming Xie (ed.), Univ. of Toronto Press, 2014, pp. 275–301.
- Ethics and Community, chapter 24 Routledge Companion to Hermeneutics, Jeff Malpas, Hans-Helmuth Gander, London/New York, 2015, pp. 310–323.
- A Critical Hermeneutics of Agency: Cultural Studies as Critical Theory, Philosophical Approaches to Social Science, ed. B. Babich, Springer Press, 2017, pp. 63–88.
- Reflexivity and Globalization Human Affairs vol. 27,4, Fall 2017, pp. 374–388.
- Beyond Ethnocentrism: Towards a Global Social Theory, with L'ubomir Dunaj, Social Theory and Asian Dialogues, Ananta Giri (ed.), Springer, 2017, pp. 69-106.
- Social Ontology and the Varieties of Interpretation: A Hermeneutic Critique of Searle, Philosophy of the Social Sciences vol. 48,2, Spring 2018, pp. 192–217.
- Tradition, Transcendence, and the Public Sphere: A Hermeneutic Critique of Religion, Berlin Journal of Critical Theory vol. 4,2 July 2020, pp. 107-146.
- A Genealogy of Faith and Freedom, Theory, Culture & Society vol. 37,7-8, December 2020: Habermas at 90: Philosophy and the Present Condition, pp. 37-46 (Review of Jürgen Habermas, Auch eine Geschichte der Philosophie. Berlin 2019).
