= Jürgen Habermas =

German social philosopher (1929–2026)

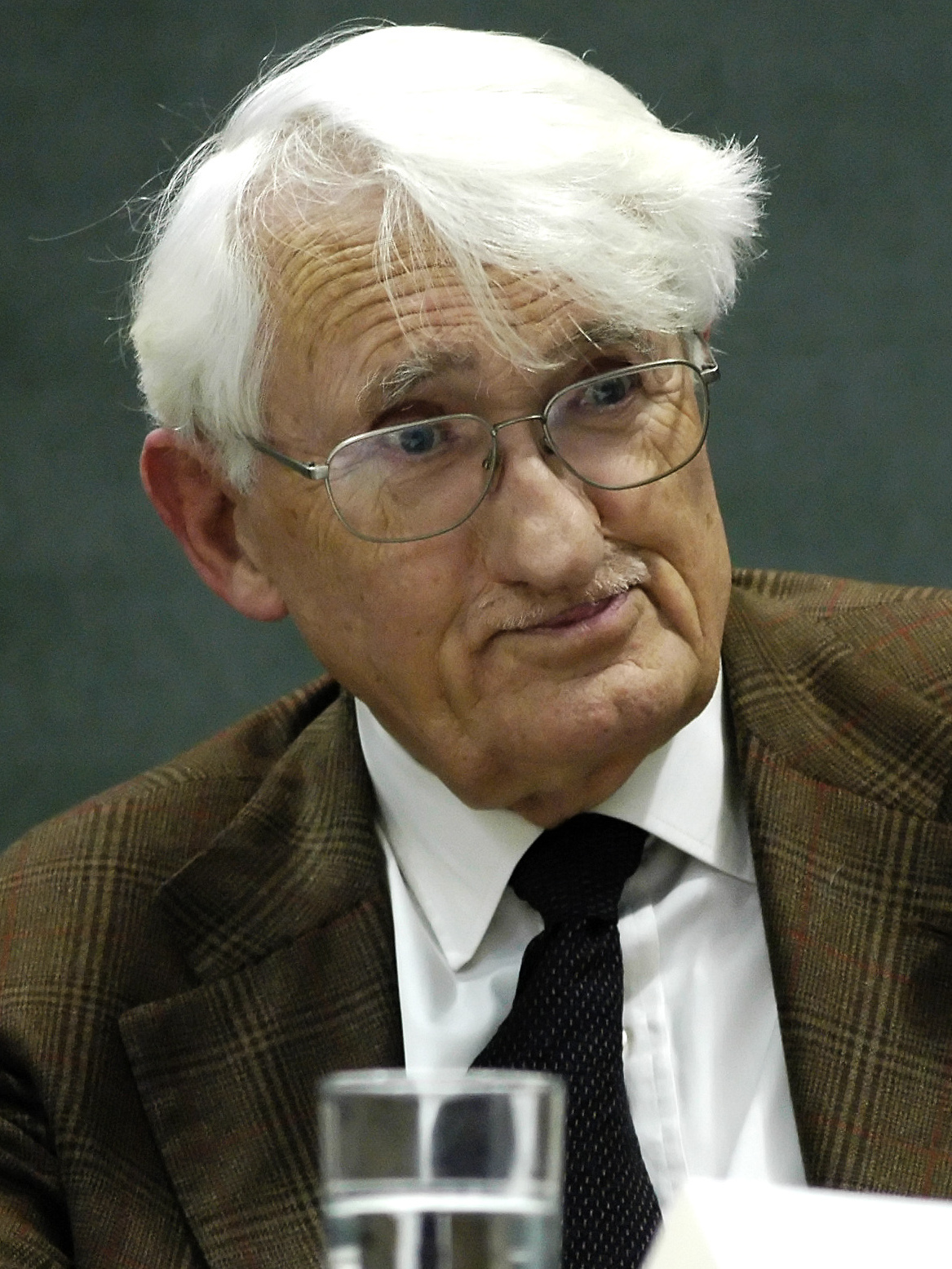
- Habermas in 2008
- Born: 18 June 1929; Düsseldorf, Weimar Republic
- Died: 14 March 2026 (aged 96); Starnberg, Germany
- Spouse: Ute Wesselhoeft (m. 1955; died 2025)
- Children: 3, including Rebekka

Education
- Education: University of Göttingen; University of Zurich; University of Bonn (PhD); University of Marburg (Hab.)
- Thesis: Das Absolute und die Geschichte. Von der Zwiespältigkeit in Schellings Denken (The Absolute and History: On the Schism in Schelling's Thought) (1954)
- Doctoral advisor: Erich Rothacker
- Other advisors: Theodor W. Adorno; Max Horkheimer

Philosophical work
- Era: Contemporary philosophy
- Region: Western philosophy
- School: Continental philosophy; Frankfurt School; Neopragmatism
- Institutions: University of Heidelberg; Goethe University Frankfurt; Max Planck Society; Northwestern University
- Doctoral students: See list: Jóhann P. Árnason; Zoran Đinđić; Rainer Forst; Hans-Hermann Hoppe; Hans-Herbert Kögler; Cristina Lafont; Konrad Ott; Lutz Wingert
- Notable students: See list: Joseph Cohen; Axel Honneth; Nikolas Kompridis; Claus Offe; H. Schnädelbach; Albrecht Wellmer
- Main interests: Epistemology; critical social theory; political theory; philosophy of law; rationalization; pragmatics; pragmatism
- Notable works: The Structural Transformation of the Public Sphere (1962); The Theory of Communicative Action (1981)
- Notable ideas: See list: Communicative action; Communicative rationality; Constitutional patriotism; Discourse ethics; Ideal speech situation; Performative contradiction; System–lifeworld distinction; Structural transformation of the public sphere; Universal pragmatics

Jürgen Habermas (Note: /ˈhɑːbərmɑːs/ HAH-bər-mahss, UK also /-mæs/ -mass; German: [ˈjʏʁɡn̩ ˈhaːbɐmaːs]) (18 June 1929 – 14 March 2026) was a German philosopher and social theorist in the tradition of critical theory and pragmatism. His work addressed communicative rationality and the public sphere. He held professorships at Heidelberg University and Goethe University Frankfurt and directed the Max Planck Institute in Starnberg.

Associated with the Frankfurt School, Habermas's work focused on the foundations of epistemology and social theory, the analysis of advanced capitalism and democracy, the rule of law in a critical social-evolutionary context, and contemporary politics, particularly German politics. His major works include The Structural Transformation of the Public Sphere (1962), a social history of the emergence and decline of bourgeois public discourse, and The Theory of Communicative Action (1981), which advanced a theory of rationality grounded in interpersonal linguistic communication rather than in instrumental or strategic reason.

He developed the concept of discourse ethics and argued that the Enlightenment remained an "unfinished project" requiring correction rather than abandonment. Habermas's theoretical system is devoted to revealing the possibility of reason, emancipation, and rational-critical communication latent in modern institutions and in the human capacity to deliberate and pursue rational interests. Habermas was known for his work on the phenomenon of modernity, particularly with respect to the discussions of rationalization originally set forth by Max Weber. He was influenced by American pragmatism, action theory, and poststructuralism.

As a public intellectual, Habermas intervened prominently in the West German Historikerstreit of 1986, accusing conservative historians of relativizing the Holocaust, and advocated for deeper European political integration. In his later work, he engaged with the public role of religion in secular societies, including in a widely discussed 2004 dialogue with Cardinal Joseph Ratzinger (later Pope Benedict XVI).

== Life and career ==
=== Early life ===
Habermas was born in Düsseldorf, Rhine Province, on 18 June 1929. He was born with a cleft palate and had corrective surgery twice in childhood. Habermas later argued that his speech disability made him think differently about the importance of deep dependence and of communication. Until his graduation from grammar school, he grew up in a staunchly Protestant environment in Gummersbach (near Cologne), where his grandfather Friedrich Habermas had been the director of the local seminary. His father, Ernst Habermas, who was executive director of the Cologne Chamber of Industry and Commerce, joined the Nazi Party in 1933 and advised it from 1939.

A teenager during World War II, Habermas joined the Deutsches Jungvolk, a junior section of the Hitler Youth, at his father's instigation, and rose to the rank of Jungvolkführer (leader), which allowed him to remain in this formation beyond the age of 14. He organised first aid training as part of medical corps service. From August 1944, his detachment operated anti-aircraft guns against the Allied advances on the Siegfried Line. He narrowly avoided being drafted into the Wehrmacht at a closing stage of the war, shortly before the arrival of American troops near his home.

=== Education and career ===
Habermas studied at the universities of Göttingen (1949–1950), Zurich (1950–1951), and Bonn (1951–1954) and earned a doctorate in philosophy from Bonn in February 1954 with a dissertation written on the tension between the absolute and history in Schelling's thought, entitled Das Absolute und die Geschichte. Von der Zwiespältigkeit in Schellings Denken ("The Absolute and History: On the Schism in Schelling's Thought"). His dissertation committee included Erich Rothacker and Oskar Becker, both of whom were former Nazis. Habermas later described the approach of his thesis as Heideggerian and noted that it led him to the work of young Marx via Karl Löwith.

In the mid-1950s, Habermas worked briefly as a journalist. His 1953 article for the right-wing daily Frankfurter Allgemeine Zeitung expressed outrage at the publication of Martin Heidegger's 1935 lectures (Introduction to Metaphysics) that contained a reference to the "inner truth and greatness" of Nazism, while defending a complete separation between Heidegger's philosophy and politics. Habermas's essay "The Dialectic of Rationalisation" of 1954 sketched the outline for his later work, including his critical engagement with the Western Marxists.

In 1956, Habermas became Theodor W. Adorno's research assistant at the University of Frankfurt am Main's Institute for Social Research (IfS). From 1956 to 1959, he studied philosophy and sociology under Adorno and the fellow critical theorist Max Horkheimer at the IfS. He was involved at the time in the early anti-nuclear movement. His work and activities soon provoked strong objections from Horkheimer, who tried to block the publication of Student und Politik. Eine soziologische Untersuchung zum politischen Bewusstsein Frankfurter Studenten written by Habermas with Ludwig von Friedeburg and three others (on the grounds that it would "encourage" the East German Communists and "play into the hands of the potential fascists at home"), demanded that Adorno sack Habermas as his assistant in 1958, and made unacceptable demands for revision of his dissertation.

Combined with his own belief that the Frankfurt School had become paralyzed with political skepticism and disdain for modern culture, the conflict resulted in Habermas leaving Frankfurt and finishing his habilitation in political science at the University of Marburg under the Marxist Wolfgang Abendroth. His 1961 habilitation work was entitled Strukturwandel der Öffentlichkeit. Untersuchungen zu einer Kategorie der bürgerlichen Gesellschaft (published in English translation in 1989 as The Structural Transformation of the Public Sphere: An Inquiry into a Category of Bourgeois Society). It is a detailed social history of the development of the bourgeois public sphere from its origins in the 18th-century salons up to its transformation through the influence of capital-driven mass media.

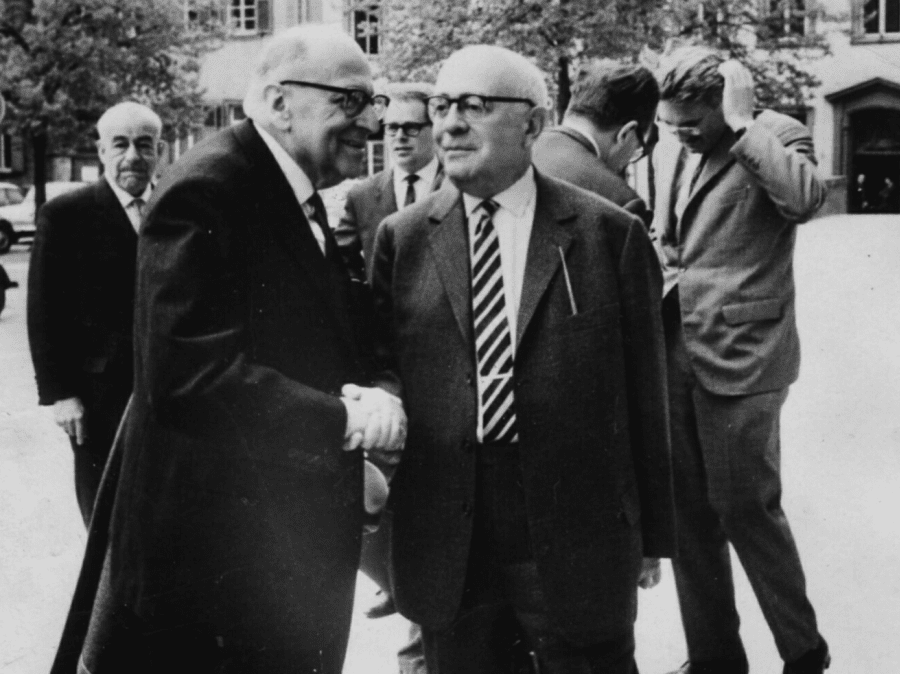
Habermas (far right) in Heidelberg, 1964, with Horkheimer (front left) and Adorno (front right)

In 1961, Habermas became a Privatdozent in Marburg, and—in a move that was highly unusual for the German academic scene of that time—he was offered the position of "extraordinary professor" (professor without chair) of philosophy at the University of Heidelberg (at the instigation of Hans-Georg Gadamer and Karl Löwith) in 1962, which he accepted. In 1964, strongly supported by Adorno, Habermas returned to Frankfurt to take over Horkheimer's chair in philosophy and sociology, and reconciled with Horkheimer, who provided a glowing reference for him to the American Jewish Committee in 1965. The philosopher Albrecht Wellmer was Habermas's assistant in Frankfurt from 1966 to 1970.

Following Adorno's death in 1969, Habermas, who had earlier declined the directorship of the Institute for Social Research, recommended Leszek Kołakowski to take up the role in the following year. When the proposal fell through due to opposition from the philosophy department, Habermas published an open letter against the institutionalisation of critical theory.

In 1971, he accepted the position of co-director (alongside Carl Friedrich von Weizsäcker) of the Max Planck Institute for the Study of the Scientific and Technical World in Starnberg, near Munich, and worked there until 1983, two years after the publication of his magnum opus, The Theory of Communicative Action. He proclaimed his definitive break with the Frankfurt School of critical theory in a 1971 letter to Herbert Marcuse. Habermas served as the doctoral advisor to Hans-Hermann Hoppe, who earned his doctorate in 1974, although he came to reject much of Habermas's thought. He was elected a Foreign Honorary Member of the American Academy of Arts and Sciences in 1984.

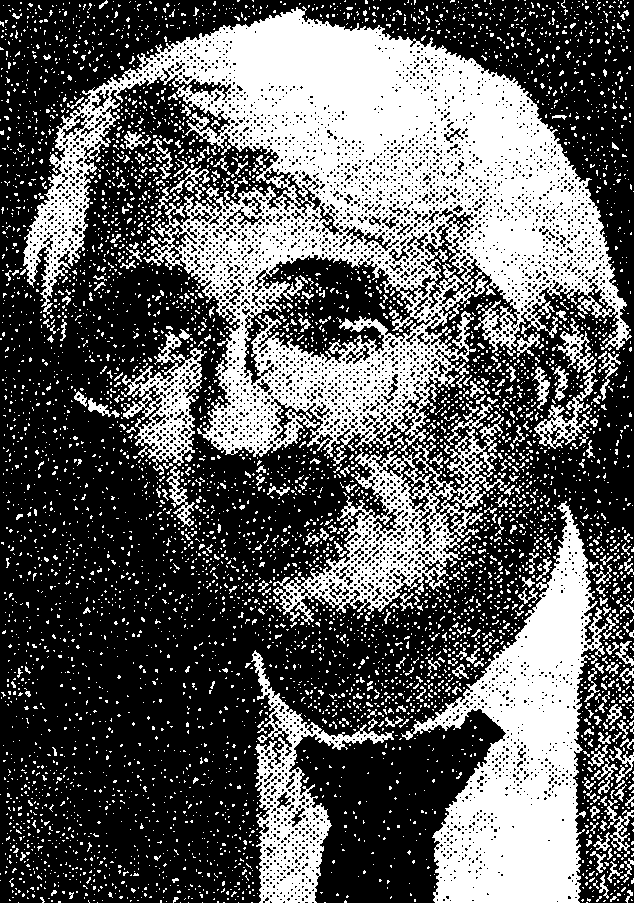
Habermas in 1986

In 1983, Habermas returned to his chair at Frankfurt. In 1986, he received the Gottfried Wilhelm Leibniz Prize of the Deutsche Forschungsgemeinschaft, which is the highest honour awarded in German research. Since he retired from Frankfurt in 1994, Habermas continued to publish extensively. He held the position of "permanent visiting" professor at Northwestern University in Evanston, Illinois, and "Theodor Heuss Professor" at The New School, New York City. He was elected a foreign member of the Serbian Academy of Sciences and Arts on 15 December 1988.

Habermas was awarded the Prince of Asturias Award in Social Sciences of 2003. Habermas was also the 2004 Kyoto Laureate in the Arts and Philosophy section. He traveled to San Diego and on 5 March 2005, as part of the University of San Diego's Kyoto Symposium, gave a speech entitled The Public Role of Religion in Secular Context, regarding the evolution of separation of church and state from neutrality to intense secularism. He received the 2005 Holberg International Memorial Prize (about €520,000). In 2007, Habermas was listed as the seventh most-cited author in the humanities (including the social sciences) by The Times Higher Education Guide, ahead of Max Weber and behind Erving Goffman. Bibliometric studies demonstrate his continuing influence and increasing relevance.

Scholars taught or influenced by Habermas included Jóhann P. Árnason, Axel Honneth, Hans Joas, Claus Offe, and Herbert Schnädelbach.

=== Personal life and death ===
Habermas married Ute Wesselhoeft (1930–2025), a teacher, in 1955. They had three children together. One of their children, Rebekka (1959–2023), later became professor of modern history at the University of Göttingen. Habermas died in Starnberg, where he had lived since 1971, on 14 March 2026, at the age of 96. According to De Standaard, he remained "intellectually alert" even in his final years.

== Philosophy and social theory ==
Habermas constructed a comprehensive framework of philosophy and social theory drawing on a number of intellectual traditions:

- the German philosophical thought of Immanuel Kant, Friedrich Schelling, G. W. F. Hegel, Wilhelm Dilthey, Edmund Husserl and Hans-Georg Gadamer
- the Marxian tradition—both the theory of Karl Marx as well as the critical neo-Marxian theory of the Frankfurt School, i.e. Max Horkheimer, Theodor W. Adorno and Herbert Marcuse.
- the sociological theories of Max Weber, Émile Durkheim and George Herbert Mead
- the philosophy of language and speech act theories of Ludwig Wittgenstein, J. L. Austin, P. F. Strawson, Stephen Toulmin and John Searle
- the developmental psychology of Jean Piaget and Lawrence Kohlberg
- the American pragmatist tradition of Charles Sanders Peirce and John Dewey
- the sociological social systems theory of Talcott Parsons and Niklas Luhmann
- Neo-Kantian thought

Jürgen Habermas considered his major contribution to be the development of the concept and theory of communicative reason or communicative rationality, which distinguishes itself from the rationalist tradition by locating rationality in structures of interpersonal linguistic communication. This social theory advances the goals of human emancipation, while maintaining an inclusive universalist moral framework.

This framework rests on the argument called universal pragmatics—that all speech acts have an inherent telos—the goal of mutual understanding, and that human beings possess the communicative competence to bring about such understanding. Habermas built the framework out of the speech-act philosophy of J. L. Austin and John Searle, transformational grammar of Noam Chomsky, formal semantics of Gottlob Frege and Michael Dummett, intentionalist semantics of Paul Grice, use theory of meaning of Ludwig Wittgenstein, hermeneutics of Wilhelm Dilthey and Hans-Georg Gadamer, transcendental pragmatics of Karl-Otto Apel and inferential semantics of Robert Brandom.

Habermas's works resonate within the traditions of Kant and the Enlightenment and of democratic socialism through his emphasis on the potential for transforming the world and arriving at a more humane, just, and egalitarian society through the realization of the human potential for reason, in part through discourse ethics. While Habermas has stated that the Enlightenment is an "unfinished project", he argues it should be corrected and complemented, not discarded. In this he distances himself from the Frankfurt School, criticizing it, as well as much of postmodernist thought, for excessive pessimism, radicalism, and exaggerations. Due to Habermas's break with critical theory's original negative assessment of capitalism, Gordon Finlayson considers him a member of the first-generation Starnberg School rather than second-generation Frankfurt School.

Within sociology, Habermas's major contribution was the development of a comprehensive theory of societal evolution and modernization focusing on the difference between communicative rationality and rationalization on one hand and strategic/instrumental rationality and rationalization on the other. This includes a critique from a communicative standpoint of the differentiation-based theory of social systems developed by Niklas Luhmann.

Habermas perceives the rationalization, humanization and democratization of society in terms of the institutionalization of the potential for rationality that is inherent in the communicative competence that is unique to the human species. Habermas contends that communicative competence has developed through the course of evolution, but in contemporary society it is often suppressed or weakened by the way in which major domains of social life, such as the market, the state, and organizations, have been given over to or taken over by strategic/instrumental rationality, so that the logic of the system supplants that of the lifeworld.

In his 1981 book The Theory of Communicative Action, Habermas stated that the "market is the most important example of a norm-free regulation of cooperative contexts". Habermas had previously distanced himself from the Hegelian Marxism of György Lukács, Adorno and Karl Korsch in his lectures delivered from 1973 onwards and published as Zur Rekonstruktion des Historischen Materialismus (French translation as Après Marx) in 1976. In a 1979 interview at Starnberg, after crediting Karl-Otto Apel with first labelling him a neo-Marxist around the time of his habilitation in 1961, Habermas commented: "Today I value being considered a Marxist". He added that he was "not a Marxist in the sense of believing in Marxism as a sure-fire explanation. Still, Marxism did give me both the impetus and the analytical means to investigate the development of the relationship between democracy and capitalism". He claimed to be "the last Marxist" as late as 1989. Harry F. Dahms sees Habermas as "one of [the] latest, though not unambivalent, representatives" of Weberian Marxism, with Irfan Ahmad arguing that the influence of Max Weber on Habermas (via Talcott Parsons) overrides that of Karl Marx. Habermas's reading of Marx was criticised as "at best, questionable and, at worst, deeply flawed".

=== Reconstructive science ===
Habermas's concept of "reconstructive science" – in Italian scholar Luca Corchia's words – "placed the "general theory of society" between philosophy and social science and re-established the rift between the "great theorization" and the "empirical research"". Habermas used rational reconstruction as a model for analysing the development of social systems in terms of a dialectic between symbolic representations and material reproduction. His survey of social evolution distinguished primitive, traditional, modern and contemporary formations.

=== Public sphere ===
In The Structural Transformation of the Public Sphere, Habermas argues that prior to the 18th century, European culture had been dominated by a "representational" culture, where one party sought to "represent" itself on its audience by overwhelming its subjects. As an example of "representational" culture, Habermas argued that Louis XIV's Palace of Versailles was meant to show the greatness of the French state and its King by overpowering the senses of visitors to the Palace. Habermas identifies "representational" culture as corresponding to the feudal stage of development according to Marxist theory, arguing that the coming of the capitalist stage of development marked the appearance of Öffentlichkeit (the public sphere). In the culture characterized by Öffentlichkeit, there occurred a public space outside of the control by the state, where individuals exchanged views and knowledge.

In Habermas's view, the growth in newspapers, journals, reading clubs, Masonic lodges, and coffeehouses in 18th-century Europe, all in different ways, marked the gradual replacement of "representational" culture with Öffentlichkeit culture. Habermas argued that the essential characteristic of the Öffentlichkeit culture was its "critical" nature. Unlike "representational" culture where only one party was active and the other passive, the Öffentlichkeit culture was characterized by a dialogue as individuals either met in conversation, or exchanged views via the print media.

Habermas maintains that as Britain was the most liberal country in Europe, the culture of the public sphere emerged there first around 1700, and the growth of Öffentlichkeit culture took place over most of the 18th century in Continental Europe. In his view, the French Revolution was in large part caused by the collapse of "representational" culture, and its replacement by Öffentlichkeit culture. Though Habermas's main concern in The Structural Transformation of the Public Sphere was to expose what he regarded as the deceptive nature of free institutions in the West, his book had a major effect on the historiography of the French Revolution.

According to Habermas, a variety of factors resulted in the eventual decay of the public sphere, including the growth of a commercial mass media, which turned the critical public into a passive consumer public; and the welfare state, which merged the state with society so thoroughly that the public sphere was squeezed out. It also turned the "public sphere" into a site of self-interested contestation for the resources of the state rather than a space for the development of a public-minded rational consensus.

His most known work to date, The Theory of Communicative Action (1981), is based on an adaptation of Talcott Parsons' AGIL paradigm. In this work, Habermas voiced criticism of the process of modernization, which he saw as inflexible direction forced through by economic and administrative rationalization. Habermas outlined how our everyday lives are penetrated by formal systems as parallel to development of the welfare state, corporate capitalism and mass consumption. These reinforcing trends rationalize public life. Disfranchisement of citizens occurs as political parties and interest groups become rationalized and representative democracy replaces participatory democracy.

In consequence, boundaries between public and private, the individual and society, the system and the lifeworld are deteriorating. Democratic public life cannot develop where matters of public importance are not discussed by citizens. An "ideal speech situation" requires participants to have the same capacities of discourse, social equality and their words are not confused by ideology or other errors. In this version of the consensus theory of truth Habermas maintains that truth is what would be agreed upon in an ideal speech situation.

Habermas has expressed optimism about the possibility of the revival of the public sphere. He discerns a hope for the future where the representative democracy-reliant nation-state is replaced by a deliberative democracy-reliant political organism based on the equal rights and obligations of citizens. In such a direct democracy-driven system, the activist public sphere is needed for debates on matters of public importance as well as the mechanism for that discussion to affect the decision-making process.

== Key dialogues and engagement with politics ==
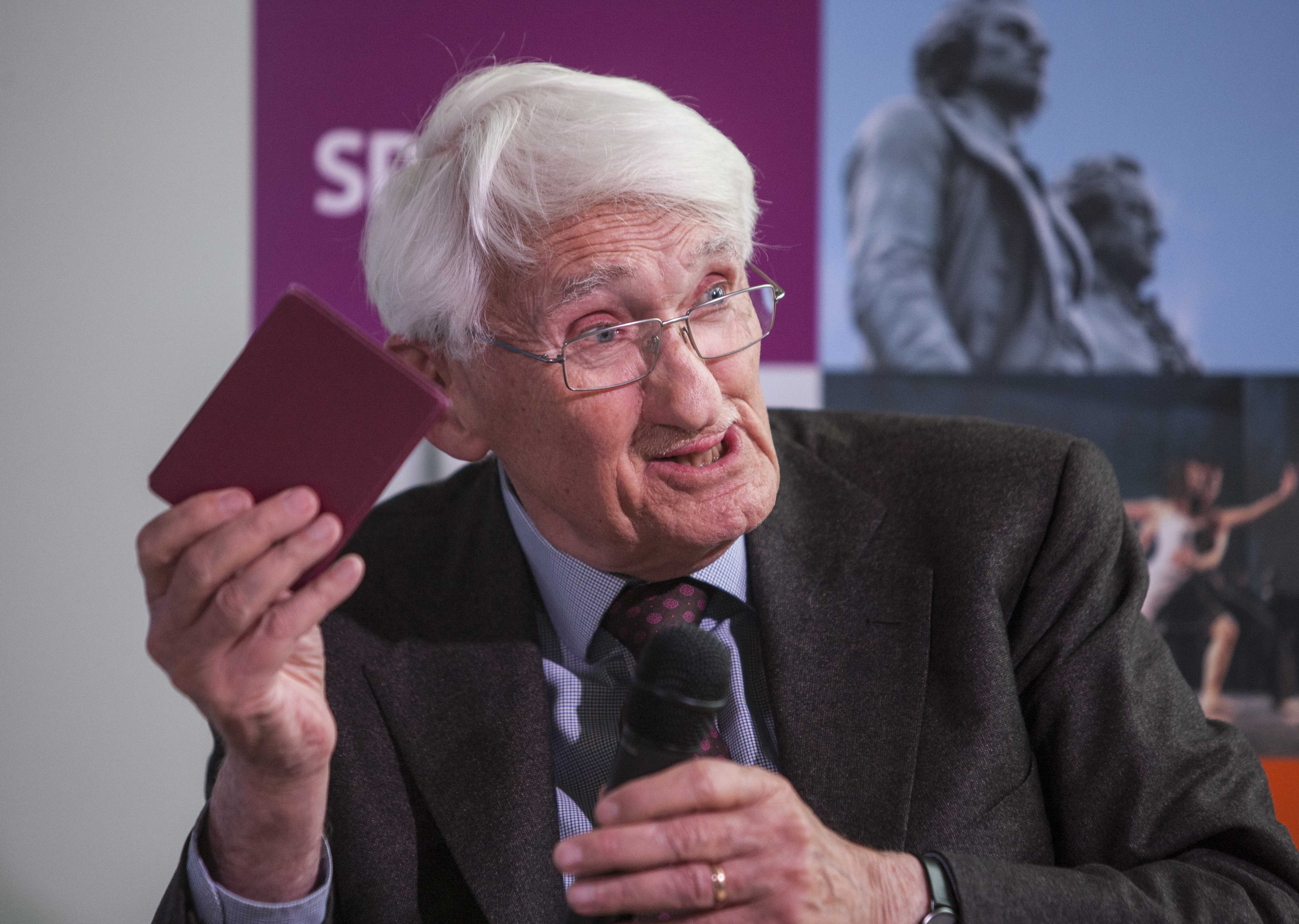
Habermas demonstrating his European Union citizenship with his passport during a 2014 lecture

=== Positivism dispute ===
The positivism dispute was a political-philosophical dispute between the critical rationalists (Karl Popper, Hans Albert) and the Frankfurt School (Theodor Adorno, Habermas) in 1961, about the methodology of the social sciences. It grew into a broad discussion within German sociology from 1961 to 1969.

=== Habermas and Gadamer ===
There is a controversy between Habermas and Hans-Georg Gadamer about limits of hermeneutics. Gadamer completed his magnum opus, Truth and Method, in 1960, and engaged in his debate with Habermas over the possibility of transcending history and culture to find a truly objective position from which to critique society.

During the 1960s, Gadamer supported Habermas and advocated for him to be offered a job at Heidelberg before he had completed his habilitation, despite Max Horkheimer's objections. While they both criticized positivism, a philosophical disagreement arose between them in the 1970s. This disagreement expanded the scope of Gadamer's philosophical influence. Despite fundamental agreements between them, such as starting from the hermeneutic tradition and returning to Greek practical philosophy, Habermas argued that Gadamer's emphasis on tradition and prejudice blinded him to the ideological operation of power. Habermas believed that Gadamer's approach failed to enable critical reflection on the sources of ideology in society. He accused Gadamer of endorsing a dogmatic stance toward tradition, which made it difficult to identify distortions in understanding. Gadamer countered that refusing the universal nature of hermeneutics was the more dogmatic stance because it affirmed the deception that the subject can free itself from the past.

=== Habermas and Foucault ===
There is a dispute concerning whether Michel Foucault's ideas of "power analytics" and "genealogy" or Jürgen Habermas's ideas of "communicative rationality" and "discourse ethics" provides a better critique of the nature of power in society. The debate compares and evaluates the central ideas of Habermas and Foucault as they pertain to questions of power, reason, ethics, modernity, democracy, civil society, and social action.

=== Habermas and Apel ===
Habermas and Karl-Otto Apel both support a postmetaphysical, universal moral theory, but they disagree on the nature and justification of this principle. Apel asserts that the principle is a transcendental condition of human activity. Habermas disagrees, arguing that Apel is too concerned with transcendental conditions. Meanwhile, Apel argues that Habermas does not value critical discourse sufficiently.

=== Habermas and Rawls ===
There is a debate between Habermas and John Rawls. The debate centers around the question of how to do political philosophy under conditions of cultural pluralism, if the aim of political philosophy is to uncover the normative foundation of a modern liberal democracy. Habermas believes that Rawls's view is inconsistent with the idea of popular sovereignty, while Rawls argues that political legitimacy is solely a matter of sound moral reasoning or that democratic will formation has been unduly downgraded in his theory.

=== Historikerstreit (historians' dispute) ===
Habermas is famous both as a public intellectual and as a scholar; most notably, in the 1980s he used the popular press to attack the German historians Ernst Nolte, Michael Stürmer, Klaus Hildebrand and Andreas Hillgruber. Habermas first expressed his views on these historians in Die Zeit on 11 July 1986 in a feuilleton (a type of culture and arts opinion essay in German newspapers) entitled "A Kind of Settlement of Damages". Habermas criticized Nolte, Hildebrand, Stürmer and Hillgruber for "apologistic" history writing in regard to the Nazi era, and for seeking to "close Germany's opening to the West" that in Habermas's view had existed since 1945.

Habermas argued that Nolte, Stürmer, Hildebrand and Hillgruber had tried to detach Nazi rule and the Holocaust from the mainstream of German history, explain away Nazism as a reaction to Bolshevism, and partially rehabilitate the reputation of the Wehrmacht (German Army) during World War II. Habermas wrote that Stürmer was trying to create a "vicarious religion" in German history which, together with the work of Hillgruber, glorifying the last days of the German Army on the Eastern Front, was intended to serve as a "kind of NATO philosophy colored with German nationalism". About Hillgruber's statement that Adolf Hitler wanted to exterminate the Jews "because only such a 'racial revolution' could lend permanence to the world-power status of his Reich", Habermas wrote: "Since Hillgruber does not use the verb in the subjunctive, one does not know whether the historian has adopted the perspective of the particulars this time too".

Habermas wrote: "The unconditional opening of the Federal Republic to the political culture of the West is the greatest intellectual achievement of our postwar period; my generation should be especially proud of this. This event cannot and should not be stabilized by a kind of NATO philosophy colored with German nationalism. The opening of the Federal Republic has been achieved precisely by overcoming the ideology of Central Europe that our revisionists are trying to warm up for us with their geopolitical drumbeat about "the old geographically central position of the Germans in Europe" (Stürmer) and "the reconstruction of the destroyed European Center" (Hillgruber). The only patriotism that will not estrange us from the West is a constitutional patriotism."

The debate known as the Historikerstreit ("Historians' Dispute") was not at all one-sided, because Habermas was himself attacked by scholars like Joachim Fest, Hagen Schulze, Horst Möller, Imanuel Geiss and Klaus Hildebrand. In turn, Habermas was supported by historians such as Martin Broszat, Eberhard Jäckel, Hans Mommsen, and Hans-Ulrich Wehler.

=== Habermas and Derrida ===
Habermas and Jacques Derrida engaged in a series of disputes beginning in the 1980s and culminating in a mutual understanding and friendship in the late 1990s that lasted until Derrida's death in 2004. They originally came in contact when Habermas invited Derrida to speak at the University of Frankfurt am Main in 1984. The next year, Habermas published "Beyond a Temporalized Philosophy of Origins: Derrida" in The Philosophical Discourse of Modernity in which he described Derrida's method as being unable to provide a foundation for social critique. Derrida, citing Habermas as an example, remarked that, "those who have accused me of reducing philosophy to literature or logic to rhetoric ... have visibly and carefully avoided reading me". After Derrida's final rebuttal in 1989, the two philosophers did not continue, but, as Derrida described it, groups in the academy "conducted a kind of 'war', in which we ourselves never took part, either personally or directly".

At the end of the 1990s, Habermas approached Derrida at a party held at an American university where both were lecturing. They then met in Paris over dinner, and participated afterwards in many joint projects. In 2000, they held a joint seminar on problems of philosophy, right, ethics, and politics at the University of Frankfurt. In December 2000, in Paris, Habermas gave a lecture entitled "How to answer the ethical question?" at the Judeities. Questions for Jacques Derrida conference organized by Joseph Cohen and Raphael Zagury-Orly. The conference volume was published in English by Fordham University Press (2007).

In the aftermath of the 11 September attacks, Derrida and Habermas laid out their individual opinions on 9/11 and the war on terror in Giovanna Borradori's Philosophy in a Time of Terror: Dialogues with Jürgen Habermas and Jacques Derrida. In early 2003, both Habermas and Derrida were very active in opposing the coming Iraq War; in a manifesto that later became the book Old Europe, New Europe, Core Europe, the two called for a tighter unification of the states of the European Union in order to create a power capable of opposing American foreign policy. Derrida wrote a foreword expressing his unqualified subscription to Habermas's declaration of February 2003 ("February 15, or, What Binds Europeans Together: Plea for a Common Foreign Policy, Beginning in Core Europe") in the book, which was a reaction to the Bush administration's demands upon European nations for support in the coming Iraq War.

=== Religious dialogue ===
Habermas's attitudes toward religion changed throughout the years. Analyst Phillippe Portier identifies three phases in Habermas's attitude towards this social sphere: the first, in the decade of 1980, when the younger Jürgen, in the spirit of Marx, argued against religion seeing it as an "alienating reality" and "control tool"; the second phase, from the mid-1980s to the beginning of the 21st century, when he stopped discussing it and, as a secular commentator, relegated it to matters of private life; and the third, from then on, when Habermas saw a positive social role of religion.

In an interview in 1999 Habermas had stated:

For the normative self-understanding of modernity, Christianity has functioned as more than just a precursor or catalyst. Universalistic egalitarianism, from which sprang the ideals of freedom and a collective life in solidarity, the autonomous conduct of life and emancipation, the individual morality of conscience, human rights and democracy, is the direct legacy of the Judaic ethic of justice and the Christian ethic of love. This legacy, substantially unchanged, has been the object of a continual critical reappropriation and reinterpretation. Up to this very day there is no alternative to it. And in light of the current challenges of a post-national constellation, we must draw sustenance now, as in the past, from this substance. Everything else is idle postmodern talk.

The original German (from the Habermas Forum website) of the disputed quotation is:

Das Christentum ist für das normative Selbstverständnis der Moderne nicht nur eine Vorläufergestalt oder ein Katalysator gewesen. Der egalitäre Universalismus, aus dem die Ideen von Freiheit und solidarischem Zusammenleben, von autonomer Lebensführung und Emanzipation, von individueller Gewissensmoral, Menschenrechten und Demokratie entsprungen sind, ist unmittelbar ein Erbe der jüdischen Gerechtigkeits- und der christlichen Liebesethik. In der Substanz unverändert, ist dieses Erbe immer wieder kritisch angeeignet und neu interpretiert worden. Dazu gibt es bis heute keine Alternative. Auch angesichts der aktuellen Herausforderungen einer postnationalen Konstellation zehren wir nach wie vor von dieser Substanz. Alles andere ist postmodernes Gerede.

— Jürgen Habermas, Zeit der Übergänge (2001), p. 174f.

This statement has been misquoted in a number of articles and books, where Habermas instead is quoted for saying:

Christianity, and nothing else, is the ultimate foundation of liberty, conscience, human rights, and democracy, the benchmarks of Western civilization. To this day, we have no other options. We continue to nourish ourselves from this source. Everything else is postmodern chatter.

In his book Zwischen Naturalismus und Religion (Between Naturalism and Religion, 2005), Habermas stated that the forces of religious strength, as a result of multiculturalism and immigration, are stronger than in previous decades, and, therefore, there is a need of tolerance which must be understood as a two-way street: secular people need to tolerate the role of religious people in the public square and vice versa.

In early 2007, Ignatius Press published a dialogue between Habermas and the then Prefect of the Congregation for the Doctrine of the Faith of the Holy Office Joseph Ratzinger (elected as Pope Benedict XVI in 2005), entitled The Dialectics of Secularization. The dialogue took place on 14 January 2004 after an invitation to both thinkers by the Catholic Academy of Bavaria in Munich. It addressed contemporary questions such as:

- Is a public culture of reason and ordered liberty possible in our post-metaphysical age?
- Is philosophy permanently cut adrift from its grounding in being and anthropology?
- Does this decline of rationality signal an opportunity or a deep crisis for religion itself?

In this debate a shift of Habermas became evident—in particular, his rethinking of the public role of religion. Habermas stated that he wrote as a "methodological atheist", which means that when doing philosophy or social science, he presumed nothing about particular religious beliefs. Yet while writing from this perspective his evolving position towards the role of religion in society led him to some challenging questions, and as a result conceding some ground in his dialogue with the future Pope, that would seem to have consequences which further complicated the positions he held about a communicative rational solution to the problems of modernity.

In addition, Habermas has popularized the concept of "post-secular" society, to refer to current times in which the idea of modernity is perceived as unsuccessful and at times, morally failed, so that, rather than a stratification or separation, a new peaceful dialogue and coexistence between faith and reason must be sought to learn mutually.

=== Socialist dialogue ===
Habermas sided with other 20th-century commentators on Karl Marx such as Hannah Arendt who indicated concerns with the limits of totalitarian perspectives often associated with Marx's overestimation of the emancipatory potential of the forces of production. Arendt had presented this in The Origins of Totalitarianism, and Habermas extended this critique when writing about functional reductionism in the life-world (Lifeworld and System: A Critique of Functionalist Reason). As Habermas states:

... traditional Marxist analysis ... today, when we use the means of the critique of political economy ... can no longer make clear predictions: for that, one would still have to assume the autonomy of a self-reproducing economic system. I do not believe in such an autonomy. Precisely for this reason, the laws governing the economic system are no longer identical to the ones Marx analyzed. Of course, this does not mean that it would be wrong to analyze the mechanism which drives the economic system; but in order for the orthodox version of such an analysis to be valid, the influence of the political system would have to be ignored.

In 1973, Habermas noted "the incompatibility of the imperatives that rule the capitalistic economic system with a democratic process for forming the public will". His critique of capitalism focused on its technocratic tendencies. Habermas reiterated the positions that what refuted Marx and his theory of class struggle was the "pacification of class conflict" by the welfare state, which had developed in the West "since 1945" thanks to "a reformist relying on the instruments of Keynesian economics". Italian philosopher and historian Domenico Losurdo criticized the main point of these claims as "marked by the absence of a question that should be obvious: was the advent of the welfare state the inevitable result of a tendency inherent in capitalism? Or was it the result of political and social mobilization by the subaltern classes—in the final analysis, of a class struggle? Had the German philosopher posed this question, perhaps he would have avoided assuming the permanence of the welfare state, whose precariousness and progressive dismantlement are now obvious to everyone."

In the 1990s, Habermas criticized Third Way-style liberals and social democrats that dominated the centre-left, arguing that economically they were "barely distinguishable" from the political right. His ideas had some influence on the Chinese New Left at the turn of the millennium. In November 2016, Habermas reiterated his call for left-leaning political parties in Europe to join arms and "go on the offensive against social inequality by embarking upon a coordinated and cross-border taming of unregulated markets". In The Philosopher: Habermas and Us, Philipp Felsch reminded readers that "Habermas never ceased identifying as a socialist. But his was a socialism that by the 2000s was unapologetically reformist, even if willing to learn from the radical left."

=== European Union ===
Referencing Hegel's concept of the cunning of reason, used to describe the progressive realisation of freedom in history unbeknown to individuals, Habermas has stated that the euro represents the "cunning of economic reason". During the European debt crisis, Habermas criticized Angela Merkel's leadership in Europe. In 2013, Habermas clashed with Wolfgang Streeck, who argued the kind of European federalism espoused by Habermas was the root of the continent's crisis. Habermas declared himself a supporter of Emmanuel Macron ahead of the 2017 French presidential election.

== Awards ==
- 1973: Hegel Prize
- 1976: Sigmund Freud Prize
- 1980: Theodor W. Adorno Award
- 1985: Geschwister-Scholl-Preis for his work, Die neue Unübersichtlichkeit
- 1986: Gottfried Wilhelm Leibniz Prize
- 1987: The Sonning Prize awarded biennially for outstanding contributions to European culture
- 1995: Karl Jaspers Prize
- 1999: Theodor Heuss Prize
- 2001: Peace Prize of the German Book Trade
- 2003: The Prince of Asturias Foundation in Social Sciences
- 2004: Kyoto Prize in Arts and Philosophy (50 million Yen)
- 2005: Holberg International Memorial Prize (520,000 Euro)
- 2008: European Prize for Political Culture (Hans Ringier Foundation) at the Locarno Film Festival (50,000 Euro)
- 2010: Ulysses Medal, University College Dublin
- 2011: Viktor-Frankl-Preis
- 2012: Georg-August-Zinn-Preis
- 2012: Heinrich Heine Prize of Düsseldorf
- 2012: Cultural Honor Prize of the City of Munich
- 2013: Erasmus Prize
- 2015: Kluge Prize
- 2021: Sheikh Zayed Book Award (declined, citing the UAE's political system as a repressive non-democracy)
- 2022: Dialectic Medal
- 2022: Pour le Mérite
- 2024: Johan Skytte Prize in Political Science

== Major works ==
- The Structural Transformation of the Public Sphere (1962) ISBN 0-262-58108-6
- Theory and Practice (1963)
- On the Logic of the Social Sciences (1967)
- Toward a Rational Society (1968)
- Technology and Science as Ideology (1968)
- Knowledge and Human Interests (1971, German 1968)
- Legitimation Crisis (1975)
- Communication and the Evolution of Society (1976)
- On the Pragmatics of Social Interaction (1976)
- The Theory of Communicative Action (1981)
- Moral Consciousness and Communicative Action (1983)
- Philosophical-Political Profiles (1983)
- The Philosophical Discourse of Modernity (1985)
- The New Conservatism (1985)
- The New Obscurity: The Crisis of the Welfare State (1986)
- Postmetaphysical Thinking (1988)
- Justification and Application (1991)
- Between Facts and Norms: Contributions to a Discourse Theory of Law and Democracy (1992) (English edition 1996: ISBN 978-0262082433)
- On the Pragmatics of Communication (1992) (English edition 1998: ISBN 978-0262082655)
- The Inclusion of the Other (1996) (English edition 1998: ISBN 978-0262082679)
- A Berlin Republic (1997, collection of interviews with Habermas) (1st English edition 1998: ISBN 978-0745620442)
- The Postnational Constellation (1998) (1st English edition 2000: ISBN 978-0745623511)
- Religion and Rationality: Essays on Reason, God, and Modernity (1998) (1st English edition 2002: ISBN 978-0745624860)
- Truth and Justification (1998) (1st English edition 2003: ISBN 978-0745624242)
- The Future of Human Nature (2003) ISBN 0-7456-2986-5
- Old Europe, New Europe, Core Europe (2005) ISBN 1-84467-018-X
- The Divided West (2006) ISBN 978-0745635187
- The Dialectics of Secularization (2007, w/ Joseph Ratzinger) ISBN 978-1586171667
- Between Naturalism and Religion: Philosophical Essays (2008) ISBN 978-0745638249
- Europe: The Faltering Project (2009) ISBN 9780745646497
- The Crisis of the European Union (2012) ISBN 978-0745662428
- Also a History of Philosophy in 3 volumes (2023-2025), ISBN 978-1509543892, ISBN 978-1509545179, ISBN 978-1509558650
- A New Structural Transformation of the Public Sphere and Deliberative Politics (2023) ISBN 9781509558940

== Notes ==
Awards
Preceded by Norbert Elias	Theodor W. Adorno Award; 1980	Succeeded by Günther Anders
Preceded by William Heinesen	Sonning Prize; 1987	Succeeded by Ingmar Bergman
Preceded by Anthony Giddens	Princess of Asturias Award for Social Sciences; 2003	Succeeded by Paul Krugman
Preceded by Tamao Yoshida	Kyoto Prize in Arts and Philosophy; 2004	Succeeded by Nikolaus Harnoncourt
Preceded by Julia Kristeva	Holberg Prize; 2005	Succeeded by Shmuel Eisenstadt
Preceded by Daniel Dennett	Erasmus Prize; 2013	Succeeded by Frie Leysen
Preceded by Fernando Henrique Cardoso	Kluge Prize; 2015; With: Charles Taylor	Succeeded by Drew Gilpin Faust
