= Christian Joppke =

German political sociologist

Christian Joppke is a German political sociologist, professor and chair in general sociology at the University of Bern, Switzerland. He is the author of more than one hundred publications, monographs and manuscripts and among the most widely cited authors in the field of citizenship and immigration. Essentially a critic of multiculturalism, Joppke is self-defined "a reactionary liberal."

== Biography ==
Joppke holds a PhD degree from the University of California at Berkeley, United States. Previous appointments include the University of Southern California, the European University Institute, the University of British Columbia, and International University Bremen. He is married to Catherine Kratz, a French lawyer, and has two sons, Ben and Nicolas.

== List of Books (Monographs) ==
- Neoliberal Nationalism: Immigration and the Rise of the Populist Right. Cambridge: Cambridge University Press, 2021.
- Is Multiculturalism Dead? Crisis and Persistence in the Constitutional State. Cambridge: Polity, 2017.
- The Secular State Under Siege: Religion and Politics in Europe and America. Cambridge: Polity, 2015.
  - Swedish translation published by Daidalos, Göteborg, 2015; Turkish and German translations appeared in 2018.
- Legal Integration of Islam: A Transatlantic Comparison (with John Torpey). Cambridge, Mass.: Harvard University Press, 2013.
- Citizenship and Immigration. Cambridge: Polity, 2010.
  - Japanese translation published by Iwanami Shoten, Tokyo, 2013.
- Veil: Mirror of Identity. Cambridge: Polity, 2009.
  - Japanese translation published by Hosei University Press, Tokyo, 2015.
- Selecting by Origin: Ethnic Migration in the Liberal State. Cambridge, Massachusetts: Harvard University Press, 2005
- Immigration and the Nation-State: The United States, Germany, and Great Britain. Oxford: Oxford University Press, 1999.
- East German Dissidents and the Revolution of 1989: Social Movement in a Leninist Regime. London: Macmillan and New York: New York University Press, 1995
- Mobilizing Against Nuclear Energy: A Comparison of Germany and the United States. Berkeley and Los Angeles: University of California Press, 1993.
