= John Torpey =

American sociologist

John Christopher Torpey
- Born: August 22, 1959 (age 67)
- Occupations: Professor, scholar, academic
- Awards: Fulbright Distinguished Chair in American Studies

Academic background
- Education: Ph.D.
- Alma mater: University of California, Berkeley (Ph.D., 1992); Amherst College (B.A., 1981)
- Thesis: Between anti-fascism and opposition: East German intellectuals, socialism, and the national question, 1945-1990 (1992)
- Doctoral advisor: Jerome Karabel

Academic work
- Discipline: Sociologist
- Institutions: Graduate Center, CUNY (2005-); University of British Columbia (2000-2006); University of California, Irvine (1996-2000)
- Main interests: Comparative historical sociology, Comparative religion

John Christopher Torpey (born August 22, 1959) is an American academic, sociologist, and historian best known for his scholarship on the state, identity, and contemporary politics. Torpey is currently a professor of sociology and history at the Graduate Center, CUNY and director of the Graduate Center's Ralph Bunche Institute for International Studies. From 2016 to 2017, Torpey served as the president of the Eastern Sociological Society.

== Education and career ==
Torpey received his Bachelor of Arts degree from Amherst College in 1981 in political science, before completing his Ph.D. in sociology at University of California, Berkeley in 1992. At Berkeley, Torpey wrote his dissertation under the guidance of Jerome Karabel, Robert Bellah, and Martin Jay, which later became the foundation of his first book Intellectuals, Socialism, and Dissent: The East German Opposition and its Legacy.

Torpey has held permanent teaching positions at the University of California, Irvine, the University of British Columbia, and at the Graduate Center, CUNY. In 2010, Torpey was the Fulbright Distinguished Chair in American Studies at the Karl-Franzens-University in Graz, Austria.

In addition to teaching, Torpey also sits on the editorial boards of the journals Theory and Society and Journal of Human Rights.

== Work ==
Torpey has written extensively on the role of the state in shaping modern social life. In Intellectuals, Socialism, and Dissent, Torpey examined the role of intellectuals within the German Democratic Republic, their role in the Republic's eventual collapse, as well as their aspirations for reform. Torpey has also received significant attention for his book The Invention of the Passport: Surveillance, Citizenship, and the State, which examines the institution of the modern passport. In The Invention of the Passport, Torpey borrows from sociologist Max Weber, arguing that states hold a “monopolization of the legitimate means of movement” and that the passport functions as a way of displacing and amplifying their administrative power.

Torpey's most recent scholarship focuses on religion in modern society. Alongside Christian Joppke, Torpey has written on the legal and cultural integration of Islam into Western liberal democracies, comparing the United States, Germany, France, and Canada. He has also been a contributor to the Axial Age debate.

== Bibliography ==
=== Solely Authored Books ===
- Torpey, John C. (2017). The Three Axial Ages: Moral, Material, Mental. New Brunswick: Rutgers University Press. ISBN 978-0813590516.
- Torpey, John C. (2006). Making Whole What has Been Smashed: On Reparations Politics. Cambridge: Harvard University Press. ISBN 978-0813592237.
- Torpey, John C. (2000). The Invention of the Passport: Surveillance, Citizenship, and the State. Cambridge: Cambridge University Press. ISBN 978-0521634939.
- Torpey, John C. (1995). Intellectuals, Socialism, and Dissent: The East German Opposition and its Legacy. Minneapolis: University of Minnesota Press. ISBN 978-0816625673.

=== Co-authored books ===
- Joppke, Christian; Torpey, John C. (2013). Legal Integration of Islam: A Transatlantic Comparison. Cambridge: Harvard University Press. ISBN 978-0674072848.

=== Edited volumes ===
- Gorski, Philip; Kyuman Kim, David; Torpey, John; VanAntwerpen, Jonathan, eds. (2012). The Post-Secular in Question: Religion in Contemporary Society. New York: New York University Press. ISBN 978-0814738726.
- Levy, Daniel; Penksy, Max; Torpey, John, eds. (2005). Old Europe, New Europe, Core Europe: Transatlantic Relations after the Iraq War. New York: Verso. ISBN 978-1844675203.
- Torpey, John, ed. (2003). Politics and the Past: On Repairing Historical Injustices. Lanham: Rowman & Littlefield. ISBN 978-0742517998.
- Caplan, Jane; Torpey, John, eds. (2001). Documenting Individual Identity: The Development of State Practices in the Modern World. Princeton: Princeton University Press. ISBN 978-0691009124.
