= The Philosophical Discourse of Modernity =

1985 book by Jürgen Habermas

- Cover of the German edition
- Author: Jürgen Habermas
- Original title: Der Philosophische Diskurs der Moderne: Zwölf Vorlesungen
- Translator: Frederick Lawrence
- Language: German
- Subject: Modernity
- Publisher: Suhrkamp Verlag, MIT Press
- Publication date: 1985
- Publication place: Germany
- English publication date: 1987
- Media type: Print
- Pages: 430 (English edition)
- ISBN: 0-262-58102-7

The Philosophical Discourse of Modernity: Twelve Lectures (German: Der Philosophische Diskurs der Moderne: Zwölf Vorlesungen) is a 1985 book by the philosopher Jürgen Habermas, in which the author reconstructs and deals in depth with a number of philosophical approaches to the critique of modern reason and the Enlightenment "project" since Georg Wilhelm Friedrich Hegel and Friedrich Nietzsche, including the work of 20th century philosophers Max Horkheimer, Theodor Adorno, Martin Heidegger, Michel Foucault, Jacques Derrida, Cornelius Castoriadis and Niklas Luhmann. The work is regarded as an important contribution to Frankfurt School critical theory. It has been characterized as a critical (largely negative) evaluation of the concept of world disclosure in modern philosophy.

An English translation by Frederick G. Lawrence was published in 1987. A French translation by Christian Bouchindhomme and Rainer Rochlitz was published in 1988.

== Summary ==
Habermas presents an outline of the “cultural self-understanding of modernity” as it emerged in Europe during the eighteenth and nineteenth centuries, and attempts to retrieve the “historical context of Western rationalism” in which modernity or modernization (more narrowly conceived in terms of social and economic transformation) was originally understood as both a process of disenchantment and alienation as well as the “historical objectification of rational structures.” This presentation prepares the ground for the larger argument of the book, namely, that by losing sight of the “cultural impulse of modernity,” and abandoning the project of modernity as a whole, European intellectuals on both ends of the political spectrum have ignored the emancipatory dimension of the European Enlightenment, and thereby have renounced the only means of developing a consistent and immanent critique of modernity itself.

Modernity is defined by Habermas as a set of problems related to the issue of time, problems produced by the transformation of European society in accordance with what Hegel called the “principle of subjectivity,” the notion of individual autonomy as the essence of man. This freedom from all forms of external authority, which includes nature as well as tradition, means that the subject “has to create its normativity out of itself;” because it is free, it cannot accept any value or law that it does not recognize as its own. Subjectivity, in other words, is defined by “the right to criticism: the principle of the modern world requires that what anyone is to recognize shall reveal itself to him as something entitled to recognition." Insofar as the subject wills only those laws that recognizes as rational, laws which are “self-proscribed and self-obligated,” the subject wills only itself, or, in Hegelian terms, it “wills the Will:” “The Will is Free only when it does not will anything alien, extrinsic, foreign to itself (as long as it does so, it is dependent), but wills itself alone – wills the Will. This is the absolute Will – the volition to be free.”

According to Habermas, Nietzsche undertakes a critique of “subject-centered reason,” of modern forms of knowledge and ethics, from a standpoint that only appears to be “genealogical,” that is, situated, historically, outside of modernity and Enlightenment thinking in an archaic, Dionysian era of myth, prior to the formation of modern subjectivity in the renunciation of instinct or “life.” He sees Nietzsche’s argument that all moral and cognitive claims (along with the rational subject) are the historical products of a power forced inward by its inability to discharge itself not as being based on a genealogy of modernity, but rather as a critique of the modern cognitive and practical subject from the perspective of an equally modern aesthetics (which Nietzsche “transposes,” according to Habermas, “into the archaic”), elevating the “judgment of taste of the art critic into a model for value judgment.” Nietzsche's critique of subject, in other words, is based on a modern aesthetic experience – in particular, the “painful de-differentiation, a de-delimitation of the individual, a merging with amorphous nature within and without” – which presupposes the modern subject itself. What appears, then, in Nietzsche as the historical “other” reason is in fact a version of Kantian aesthetics shorn of any claim of intersubjective validity.
