= Leo Kofler =

Austrian-German Marxist sociologist

Leo Kofler (also known by the pseudonyms Stanislaw Warynski or Jules Dévérité; 26 April 1907 – 29 July 1995) was an Austrian-German Marxist sociologist. He ranks with the Marburg politicologist Wolfgang Abendroth and the Frankfurt school theoreticians Max Horkheimer and Theodor W. Adorno among the few well-known Marxist intellectuals in post-war Germany. However, almost nothing of his work was ever translated into English, and he is therefore little known in the English-speaking world. Kofler had his own, distinctive interpretation of Marxism, which connected sociology and history with aesthetics and anthropology.

== Biography ==
Kofler was born of Jewish parents on 26 April 1907 in Chotymyr, Galicia, Austria-Hungary (now Ivano-Frankivsk Raion, Ivano-Frankivsk Oblast, Ukraine). World War I in 1915/16 drove his family to escape to Vienna, where Leo attended business school, until 1927. His working career was cut short by the 1929 stock crash, and he became an adviser of a social-democratic education center in Vienna, joining the left wing of the social-democratic labour party (SDAP). From 1933 to 1934, he devoted himself to research with Max Adler. In July 1938, after the annexation of Austria by Nazi Germany, he escaped to Basel, Switzerland, where he was interned in an immigrant camp. Most of his family was murdered in the Holocaust, and his parents were shot in 1942. Nevertheless, he continued his theoretical studies, being influenced especially by the writings of Georg Lukács. In 1944 he published his first book under the pseudonym "Stanislaw Warynski".

His second book, on the history of the civil society, was published in 1948 in East Germany. In September 1947 he moved to the Soviet-occupied zone of Germany, and in 1948 became lecturer in medieval and modern history at the University of Halle. But after his public criticism of the Stalinization of the Socialist Unity Party, he was dismissed from his post. At the end of 1950, he escaped with his future wife Ursula Wieck to Cologne in West Germany, and worked there as well as in Dortmund and Bochum as lecturer and researcher, publishing a stream of books and articles.

He died on 29 July 1995 in Cologne after a lengthy illness.

== Main works ==
- Die Wissenschaft von der Gesellschaft , 1944, 1971
- Zur Geschichte der bürgerlichen Gesellschaft. Versuch einer verstehenden Deutung der Neuzeit, 1948.
- Stalinistischer Marxismus, 1951
- Das Wesen und die Rolle der stalinistischen Bürokratie, 1952.
- Der Fall Lukacs. Georg Lukacs und der Stalinismus, 1952
- Geschichte und Dialektik, 1955
- Staat, Gesellschaft und Elite zwischen Humanismus und Nihilismus, 1960
- Das Ende der Philosophie?, 1961
- Zur Theorie der modernen Literatur, 1962
- Der proletarische Bürger, 1964
- Der asketische Eros. Industriekultur und Ideologie, 1967
- Perspektiven des revolutionären Humanismus, 1968
- Marxistische Staatstheorie, 1970
- Stalinismus und Bürokratie, 1970
- Kunst und absurde Literatur 1970,
- Technologische Rationalität im Spätkapitalismus, 1971
- In Aggression und Gewissen. Grundlegung einer anthropologischen Erkentnnistheorie 1973
- Haut den Lukács. Realismus und Subjektivismus 1977.
- Der Alltag zwischen Eros und Entfremdung, 1982
- Beherrscht uns die Technik? Technologische Rationalität im Spätkapitalismus, 1983
- Aggression und Gewissen. Grundlegung einer anthropologischen Erkenntnistheorie, 1973
- Soziologie des Ideologischen, 1975
- Geistiger Verfall und progressive Elite, 1981
- Der Alltag zwischen Eros und Entfremdung. Perspektiven zu einer Wissenschaft von Alltag, 1982.
- Eros, Ästhetik, Politik. Thesen zum Menschenbild bei Marx, 1985
- Aufbruch in der Sowjetunion? 1986
- Die Vergeistigung der Herrschaft, 2 Bände 1986/87
- Avantgardismus als Entfremdung. Ästhetik und Ideologiekritik, 1987
- "Die Kritik ist der Kopf der Leidenschaft." Aus dem Leben eines marxistischen Grenzgängers. Ein Gespräch anlässlich seines 80. Geburtstages mit Wolf Schönleitner und Werner Seppmann, 1987
- Zur Kritik bürgerlicher Freiheit. Ausgewählte politisch-philosophische Texte eines marxistischen Einzelgängers, Hrsg. Christoph Jünke, 2000

== Commentaries in German ==
- Humanistische Anthropologie und dialektischer Materialismus. Ein Arbeitsbuch. Leo Kofler zum 70. Geburtstag. Broschiert – 320 Seiten, November 1982, ISBN 3-87958-710-8
- Marxismus und Anthropologie. Festschrift für Leo Kofler. Bochum: Germinal Verlag, 1980.
- Jünke, Christoph (Hg.), Am Beispiel Leo Koflers. Marxismus im 20. Jahrhundert. Münster: Verlag Westfälisches Dampfboot, 2001.

== Commentaries in English ==
- Holz, Hans Heinz; Kofler, Leo; Abendroth, Wolfgang (1974). Pinkus, Theo (ed.). Conversations with Lukács. Cambridge, Mass: MIT Press. ISBN 0262160625.
- Christoph Jünke: Leo Kofler’s Philosophy of Praxis: Western Marxism and Socialist Humanism. With Six Essays by Leo Kofler Published in English for the First Time. Brill: Leiden 2022, ISBN 978-90-04-50255-0.
