= Philip Gorski =

American sociologist

- Born: 1963 (age 62–63)

Academic background
- Education: Deep Springs College (AA); Harvard University (BA); University of California, Berkeley (PhD)
- Doctoral advisor: Robert Neelly Bellah

Academic work
- Discipline: Sociologist
- Institutions: University of Wisconsin, Madison; Yale University; Geneva Graduate Institute
- Main interests: Sociology of religion, historical sociology
- Notable works: The Disciplinary Revolution
- Website: philipgorski.com

Philip Stephen Gorski (born 1963) is an American sociologist, interested in both the sociology of religion and historical sociology.

== Biography ==
Gorski gained an A.A. from Deep Springs College in 1983, his B.A. from Harvard University in 1986, and his Ph.D. from the University of California, Berkeley, in 1996. His advisor was sociologist of religion Robert Neelly Bellah. He worked at the University of Wisconsin, Madison from 1996 until joining Yale University in 2007, where he became co-director of the Center for Comparative Research alongside Julia Adams.. He became in 2027 a professor at the Geneva Graduate Institute.

Gorski has written or co-authored four books, edited or co-edited four books, and published numerous articles. He was one of the editors of the journal Sociological Theory. In 2011 he was awarded the Lewis A. Coser Memorial Award for Theoretical Agenda Setting by the Theory Section of the American Sociological Association.

In January 2019, Gorski attended a conference at the Van Leer Institute in Jerusalem.

== The Disciplinary Revolution ==
In his 2003 book, The Disciplinary Revolution: Calvinism and the Rise of the State in Early Modern Europe, Gorski rejects two of the dominant explanations, which are the bellicist explanation, which sees military growth as key to the emergence of strong states, and the neo-Marxist explanation, which sees economic factors as key to the explanation. Instead, Gorski points to the strong influence of religion in the formation of strong states. Specifically, Gorski sees Calvinism as crucial to the emergence of the Netherlands and Prussia as strong, centralized states, because of its emphasis on discipline and public order.

The effects of Calvinism could be seen in social welfare, crime rates, education, military effectiveness, financial responsibility, and many other parts of Dutch and Prussian social life, all of which increased their ability to form bureaucratic states. Where in the Netherlands the effect of Calvinism was from the ground upward, as most of its population was indeed Calvinist, in Prussia—where most of the population was Lutheran and only the royal house was Calvinist—the effect was from the rulers downward (to some extent through the Pietist Lutheran movement, which was influenced by Calvinism).

== Influence of white Christian nationalism ==
With co-author, Samuel L. Perry, in 2022, Gorski traced a history of white Christian nationalism from the late seventeenth century to contemporary times, in order to demonstrate its previously unrealized influence upon democracy, violence, responses to the COVID-19 pandemic, the USA election of 2020, and the 2021 insurrection at the USA Capitol in Washington, D.C. The thesis of the book, The Flag and the Cross: White Christian Nationalism and the Threat to American Democracy, is that the ethno-nationalism of white Christian nationalism works in concert with Christian libertarianism by combining white Christian nationalism with white Christian individualism and, that recognition of that influence is supported by data published contemporaneously. The extent of the threat to American democracy is examined.

== Books ==
- Philip S. Gorski and Samuel L. Perry, "The Flag and the Cross: White Christian Nationalism and the Threat to American Democracy", (Oxford University Press, 2022), with a foreword by Jemar Tisby
- Philip S. Gorski, "American Babylon: Christianity and Democracy Before and After Trump", (London: Routledge, 2020)
- Philip S. Gorski, "American Covenant: A History of Civil Religion from the Puritans to the Present" (Princeton: Princeton University Press, 2017)
- Philip S. Gorski, (ed.), Bourdieusian Theory and Historical Analysis (Durham, North Carolina: Duke University Press, 2013)
- Philip S. Gorski, David Kyuman Kim, John Torpey, and Jonathan VanAntwerpen (eds.), The Post-Secular In Question (New York: NYU Press, 2012)
- Philip S. Gorski, The Protestant Ethic Revisited (Philadelphia: Temple University Press, 2011)
- Philip S. Gorski, Charles Camic, and David Trubek (eds.), Max Weber’s Economy and Society: A Critical Companion (Stanford, California: Stanford University Press, 2005)
- Philip S. Gorski, The Disciplinary Revolution: Calvinism, Confessionalism and the Growth of State Power in Early Modern Europe (Chicago: University of Chicago Press, 2003)
- Andrei S. Markovits, and Philip S. Gorski, The German Left: Red, Green and Beyond (New York and Cambridge: Oxford University Press and Polity Press, 1993)
