= Old Europe, New Europe, Core Europe =

2005 book by Daniel Levy

Old Europe, New Europe, Core Europe: Transatlantic Relations After the Iraq War
- Book cover
- Author: Daniel Levy
- Language: English
- Subject: Iraq War
- Genre: Non-fiction
- Published: 2005 (Verso Books)
- Media type: Novel
- Pages: 231
- ISBN: 1-84467-018-X
- OCLC: 57722598
- Dewey Decimal: 303.48/24073/09051 22
- LC Class: D2024 .L48 2005

Old Europe, New Europe, Core Europe: Transatlantic Relations After the Iraq War documents for Anglophone readers the debate that took place among a number of European intellectuals in response to the manifesto by Jürgen Habermas and Jacques Derrida calling for Europe to come together around a common foreign and security policy to provide a counterweight to the "hegemonic unilateralism" of the United States. The book was first published in 2005 by Verso Books. The book was edited by Daniel Levy, Max Pensky, and John Torpey; contributors include Umberto Eco, Susan Sontag, Richard Rorty, Timothy Garton Ash, Ralf Dahrendorf, Gianni Vattimo, Adam Krzemiński, and many others.

== Reception ==
The book sparked discussion about the nature of Europe, as well as its transatlantic relations.
