= Daniel Levy (sociologist) =

German American sociologist

Daniel Levy (born 1962) is a German-American political sociologist and professor of sociology at the State University of New York at Stony Brook.

== Education ==
Levy earned a Bachelor of Arts in sociology and political science (1986) and a Master of Arts in sociology (1990) from Tel Aviv University, as well as a Doctorate of sociology from Columbia University in 1999.

== Career ==
He is a specialist on issues relating to globalization, collective memory studies, and comparative historical sociology. Levy, along with historians Paul Gootenberg and Herman Lebovics, is a founder and organizer of the Initiative for Historical Social Science, a program that is run out of Stony Brook with the goal of promoting the "New Historical Social Sciences".

Levy serves on the editorial boards of the American Sociological Association's Rose Series in Sociology, the European Journal of Social Theory, and for Memory Studies.

== Works ==
=== Books ===
- Challenging Ethnic Citizenship: German and Israeli Perspectives on Immigration (ed.) (New York: Berghahn Books, 2002) with Yfaat Weiss
- Memory and the Holocaust in a Global Age (Philadelphia: Temple University Press, 2006) with Natan Sznaider
- Old Europe, New Europe, Core Europe: Transatlantic Relations After the Iraq War (ed.) (London: Verso Books, 2005) with Max Pensky and John Torpey
- Human Rights and Memory (Pennsylvania State University Press, 2010) with Natan Sznaider. ISBN 978-0-271-03738-7.
- The Collective Memory Reader (Oxford University Press, 2011) with Jeffrey K. Olick and Vered Vinitzky-Seroussi. ISBN 978-0-19-533742-6.
