= Wolfgang Abendroth =

German socialist, jurist and political scientist

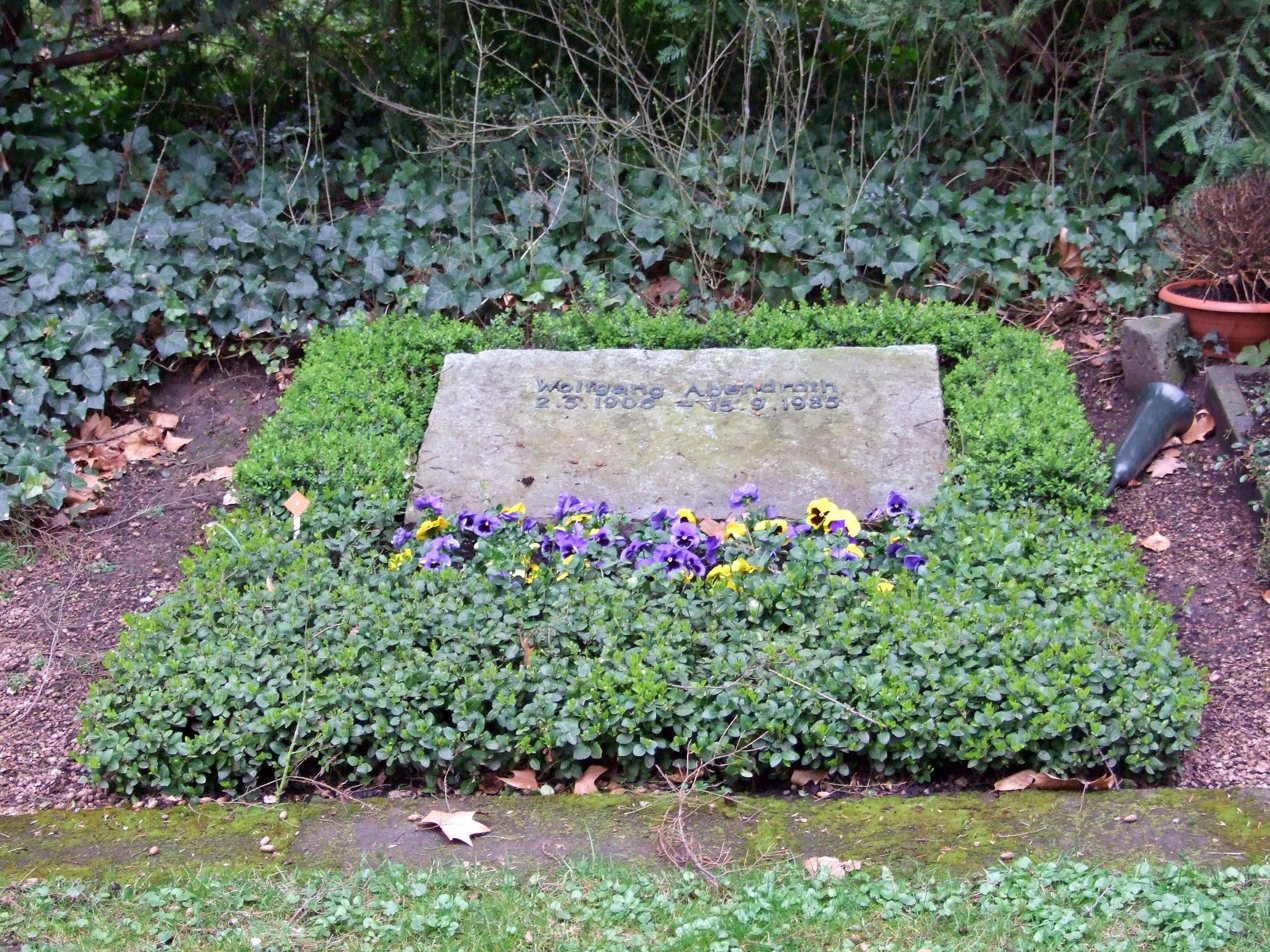
Wolfgang Abendroth's grave

Wolfgang Walter Arnulf Abendroth (German: [ˈaːbn̩tˌʁoːt]; 2 May 1906 – 15 September 1985) was a German socialist, jurist, and political scientist. He was born in Elberfeld, now a part of Wuppertal in North Rhine-Westphalia. Abendroth was a radical social democrat and an important contributor to the constitutional foundation of post-World War II West Germany. In 1943, he was forcibly drafted into one of the 999th Division's "probation units" and while stationed in Greece, he deserted to the Greek People's Liberation Army (ELAS).

After the war, he briefly held a Law professorship in East Germany. However, in 1948 he left for West Germany with his family, refusing to disassociate himself from the Social Democratic Party and join the, overwhelmingly stalinist, Socialist Unity Party of Germany (SED) which in 1949 became the ruling party of East Germany. In 1950, he was appointed professor of Political Science at Marburg and also served as a senior judge in the state court of Hesse. In 1961, he was expelled from the Social Democratic Party for refusing to disassociate himself from the Socialist German Student Union (SDS). Due to his socialist principles and politics, Abendroth was for many years after the end of the war under surveillance by West Germany's Intelligence services.

== Birth to the end of World War II ==
According to the biography provided by the German Resistance Memorial Center:

Abendroth was born in Elberfeld in 1906 and grew up in a family of Social Democrats. His father was a teacher. He joined the Young Communist League of Germany (KJVD) at the age of 14. As a result of his agitation for a united front of Social Democrats and Communists, he was expelled from the Communist Party of Germany (KPD) in 1928. In 1933, he lost his job as a junior lawyer for political reasons, and went on to provide legal advice for many opponents of the regime. Following his first arrest, Abendroth emigrated to Switzerland, where he gained his PhD. After acting as a courier for some time, he decided to return to Berlin in 1935. There, he was an active member of the resistance until he was imprisoned for several years in 1937. Forcibly drafted into one of the 999th Division's "probation units" in February 1943, he soon deserted to the Greek People's Liberation Army (ELAS). He was taken prisoner by the British, and carried out political education for opponents of the regime in prisoner of war camps in Egypt.

In particular, after the National Socialists seized power, Abendroth was forbidden to do any further legal work. From 1933 he was politically active in various illegal resistance organizations (KP opposition, Red Aid, New Beginnings, etc.). In 1935 he received his doctorate summa cum laude with a dissertation on international law at the law faculty of the University of Bern, Switzerland and in October 1936 he got a trainee position in a bank in Berlin. His doctoral dissertation was published by Verlag Marcus in Breslau at the end of 1936 but was confiscated by the Gestapo shortly afterwards.

=== Arrest by Gestapo and imprisonment for high treason ===
In February 1937, he was arrested by the Gestapo, and on November 30, 1937, the higher regional court in Kassel sentenced him to four years in prison for high treason, which he served in Luckau.

After his release in June 1941, Abendroth moved to his parents in Potsdam-Babelsberg and worked first as an auditing assistant for the accountant and tax consultant Erhard Oewerdieck and then as a business lawyer for a foreign trade company in Berlin. Immediately after his release, he met the student Lisa Hörmeyer through one of her fellow students, whom he in turn knew from the Socialist Student Union (SSB) and the Free Socialist Youth.

A marriage with Lisa Hörmeyer could not take place, however, because he was drafted into the 999th Division as a "probationary soldier" ('Bewährungssoldat') at the beginning of 1943.

=== Anti-nazi resistance in occupied Greece ===
In one of his books, Abendroth recalled his experience in German-occupied Greece. He was originally stationed in the Greek island of Lemnos where he helped set up an anti-fascist cell among the soldiers of the German occupation forces on the island.

According to Abendroth, this anti-fascist cell prevented the destruction of Lemnos's electricity generation unit that was planned by the German occupation forces as part of their retreat in 1944. During the evacuation of the island by the Germans, Abendroth and five other German soldiers defected to the Greek People's Liberation Army (ELAS), which was active on the island. Subsequently, the group was sent to the Greek island of Lesvos, where they were used in propaganda aimed at the German occupation forces on that island.

=== Imprisonment by the British ===
Eventually, Abendroth was imprisoned by the British in 1944 and, together with other German anti-fascists, was held in various British internment camps in Egypt. In one of the prison camps in the Egyptian desert, he began political training work with the labor lawyer Herbert Komm with the intention of training cadres and preparing them for administrative work that would follow after the defeat of the Nazi regime. Later, with the help of his friends Georg Schwarzenberger and Richard Löwenthal, Abendroth was taken to the Wilton Park Training Center re-education camp in the UK, where "prisoners of war who appeared suitable were prepared for their return to Germany to help build democracy". Against the background of the Labour Party's election victory in July 1945, Abendroth discussed the prospects for the workers' movement in Germany with Löwenthal.

One result of these discussions was Löwenthal's manifesto 'Beyond Capitalism', which appeared in Nuremberg in 1946 under the pseudonym Paul Sering. At the end of November 1946 Abendroth was released from captivity and during the same period he joined the German Social Democratic Party (SPD).

== After World War II ==
=== Academic and judicial positions in East Germany ===
At the end of November 1946, he was released from captivity and initially tried to gain a foothold in Marburg as a lawyer. In the same year, he married Lisa Hörmeyer. The couple had three children: Elisabeth (b. 1947), Barbara (b. 1949) and Ulrich (b. 1952). Since he was still missing the second state exam, he decided on the advice of Georg August Zinn, a companion from student days and newly appointed Hessian Minister of Justice, to take the missing exam in the Soviet Occupation Zone (SBZ). Subsequently, Abendroth returned to Potsdam with an unofficial letter of recommendation written by Zinn for Eugen Schiffer, the head of the judicial administration of the SBZ.

Thus, in January 1947, Abendroth was appointed judge at the Potsdam Regional Court, while on 1 April 1947, he entered the service of the Brandenburg Ministry of Justice as a member of the government council. After an assessor's examination, he was employed by the judicial administration of the SBZ in the summer of 1947 as a senior judicial officer. In September 1947, he was appointed lecturer at the Faculty of Law and Political Science at the Martin Luther University in Halle-Wittenberg. At the end of 1947, he was appointed to the University of Leipzig and, with effect from April 1, 1948, was appointed professor of international law. In October 1948, he received a professorship in public law from the Friedrich Schiller University in Jena, which also only lasted a few months.

Since Abendroth was officially registered in West Berlin, he did not automatically become a member of the SED, the Socialist Unity Party of Germany (German: Sozialistische Einheitspartei Deutschlands) after the forced union of the SPD and KPD. Instead, he remained an illegal member of the Social Democrats and maintained covert contact with the SPD's East Office (Ostbüro), headed by Stephan Thomas. Against the background of the repression against those Social Democrats who refused to join the SED, he moved to the western occupation zones and negotiated through his friend Herbert Komm, who worked as a lawyer in Berlin, with the Lower Saxony Minister of Education, Adolf Grimme, about an appointment to the newly founded University of Applied Sciences in Wilhelmshaven-Rüstersiel. When a courier from the SPD's Ostbüro was uncovered, Abendroth felt compelled to flee the Soviet occupation zone in December 1948. Together with his wife and daughter, he moved to Bremen to live with his parents-in-law.

In Bremen he justified his resignation in writing to the Thuringian Minister of Education, Marie Torhorst, with a carbon copy to Hilde Benjamin. Abendroth spoke out against the emerging formation of the bloc system, but promised not to allow himself to be instrumentalized against socialism in the East, since he remained a socialist despite giving up his activities.

=== Academic and judicial positions in West Germany ===
On December 21, 1948, Abendroth was appointed full professor of public law and politics at the University of Applied Sciences in Wilhelmshaven. The following year, he was elected a full member of the State Court of Justice of the State of Bremen. On November 15, 1950, again with the help of Zinn (now Hessian Prime Minister), he received a professorship at the Philosophical Faculty of the Philipps University in Marburg, and remained at this university until his retirement in 1972. From 1959 to 1963, he was also a member of the State Court of Justice of the State of Hesse.

==== The Forsthoff-Abendroth controversy ====
During Abendroth's period as an academic in Marburg took place the so-called Forsthoff-Abendroth controversy about the importance of the welfare state in West Germany's Basic Law (constitution).

After the Second World War, Ernst Forsthoff was one of the commentators on the German Basic Law of 1949. With respect to the concepts of welfare state and rule of law, Forsthoff was of the opinion that the welfare state was not an instrument of justice but an illegitimate means of distributing wealth.

Forsthoff, who in 1934 in the second edition of his book The Total State had emphatically welcomed the Nazi state and the elimination of "aliens and enemies", was a representative of traditional conservative legal and political theory. In his argument, he tried to argue that "welfare state" is not a legal concept and therefore does not represent a legal principle in the constitutional context of the Basic Law.

The socialist-leaning Abendroth, on the other hand, believed that such a legal principle must be regarded as necessary for the preservation of the rule of law and democracy. He derived this from Art. 20 I, 28 I 1 GG, on which the welfare state principle is based to this day.

=== Notable academic work ===
Among the most important publications of Abendroth are The German Trade Unions (1954), Bureaucratic Administrative State and Social Democracy (1955), Rise and Crisis of German Social Democracy (1964), Social History of the European Labor Movement (1965), Economy, Society and Democracy in the Federal Republic (1965 ) and the Basic Law. An Introduction to His Political Problems (1966). He also published numerous smaller articles in anthologies, magazines and newspapers.

While at the University of Marburg, two important academic studies were made under Abendroth's supervision concerning transformations in the public sphere.

The first was Rüdiger Altmann's study that dealt with the problem of the public sphere and its importance for modern democracy. The second, in the late 1950s, was the habilitation of major German philosopher, sociologist, and political theorist Jürgen Habermas.

Originally, Jürgen Habermas approached prominent critical theorist Max Horkheimer for his habilitation thesis supervision. After the latter turned down the "too left" Jürgen Habermas the young philosopher approached Abendroth and, eventually, produced what became a classic text of modern European political theory under the title The Structural Transformation of the Public Sphere: An Inquiry into a Category of Bourgeois Society. He dedicated it to Abendroth with the words "to Wolfgang Abendroth in gratitude."

In addition, Peter von Oertzen's study of the council movement in the November Revolution was significantly influenced by Abendroth.

=== Work for the democratization of universities ===
Abendroth developed comprehensive ideas for the democratization of universities as socio-political institutions. His activities were primarily aimed at establishing political science at universities as an independent discipline with the right to habilitation, as well as the establishment of a professional association, the German Association for Political Science. In particular on personnel issues, he tried to prevent partisans and sympathizers of the Nazi regime and instead to bring democratic scientists into position. Abendroth left no stone unturned to bring exiles and resistance fighters like Karl Korsch, Herbert Marcuse or Leo Kofler into the discussion about filling professorships. When in the 1960s the political education of high school students was to be promoted and 'social studies' was established as a high school subject, Abendroth exercised great influence on the training of suitable teachers. In 1951-2, he was involved in founding the Commission for the History of Parliamentarianism and Political Parties in Bonn.

Abendroth was always controversial as a political scientist to a large extent because of his political statements in the Federal Republic, since Marxism was considered incompatible with Western parliamentary democracy during the Cold War years. For him, however, constitutional basic rights were always a prerequisite for the realization of a socialist society and, at the same time, he could only imagine socialism in connection with the further development of human rights and civil liberties.

=== Expulsion from the SPD ===
In 1959, Abendroth took a critical stance towards the Godesberg Program, which represented a fundamental change in the orientation and goals of the SPD away from its class politics and Marxian heritage towards reforming, rather than rejecting, capitalism. Publishing his own counter-programme Abendroth tried to commit the party to maintain and indeed enhance its radical socialist principles. As described by Renaudit (2015: p. 206-7):

Abendroth's counter-program called for a lively and broadest possible participatory democracy, which required stepping beyond the parliamentary formalism of political democracy. The SPD and the socialist trade unions were ideally placed to foster the development of a healthy, extra-parliamentary opposition. Direct political participation outside the representative strictures of the parliamentary system would help build the active democratic citizenry needed to withstand the forces of "restoration".

Renaudit continued:

Unrestricted capitalist development rendered political democracy an "empty farce." The counter-program observed how elections transformed into "battles of labels without content" [inhaltslose Reklameschlachten]. Bearing that in mind, the activity of those original models of extra-parliamentary opposition, the trade unions, became all the more important. The practice of factory co-determination, for example, served as the "school of democratic administration of the socialist common property of the future." Unions were also a school of solidarity. In the wider public, they would help alter the reigning spirit of advanced capitalist society, replacing the profit motive with democratic cooperation.

During the same period, Abendroth maintained his good relations with the socialist German Student Union (SDS), the student organization of the SPD, even after the SPD had no longer professed Marxism and severed all ties with its previous student organization. As a result, he and several other professors were asked by the party executive to give up their support for the SDS. He refused.

The SPD party executive published a decision in November 1961 that membership in the SDS and/or in the Sozialistische Förderer-Gesellschaft, which was founded to financially support the SDS, was "incompatible with membership in the Social Democratic Party of Germany". As a consequence, Abendroth was expelled from the party in December 1961. Abendroth announced that, together with the Berlin political scientist Ossip K. Flechtheim and other social democratic university teachers, he would prove in court that authoritarian tendencies that contradict the Basic Law were increasing in the SPD.

=== Political activism in the 1960s and 1970s ===
Abendroth was one of the founders of the Socialist Union. He served as the first chairman of the executive board of that organization. Together with Ernst Bloch, Ossip K. Flechtheim, and Erich Kästner, he was a member of the board of trustees of the Campaign for Democracy and Disarmament (Kampagne für Demokratie und Abrüstung) in West Germany at the end of the 1960s.

Furthermore, as a member of the initiative committee of defense attorneys in political criminal matters headed by Walter Ammann, he campaigned for the lifting of the KPD ban and for the re-admission of a communist party in the Federal Republic of Germany. After the DKP was constituted, he was a member of the scientific advisory board of the Frankfurt am Main–based DKP Institute for Marxist Studies and Research (IMSF) together with other representatives of the so-called Marburg School and DKP-related scientists from other cities in the Federal Republic. In 1967, Abendroth was a member of the Russell Tribunal set up by the English philosopher Bertrand Russell to investigate war crimes in Vietnam.

Abendroth is considered one of the main proponents of the student rebellion of the 1960s, although he never agreed with the revolutionary aspirations of an (intellectual) minority. His hopes were always aimed at revolutionizing the labor movement. The "Association of Democratic Scientists", which he co-founded as a reaction to the Marburg Manifesto, was therefore intended to protect individual freedom of research from attacks by society.

After his retirement, he taught at the Academy of Labour in Frankfurt am Main. At times, he was on the board of the Association of German Constitutional Law Teachers. Abendroth was one of the founding members of the Martin Niemöller Foundation, which was established in 1974.

=== Under surveillance ===
In 2017, approximately 100,000 pages of documents were leaked to the Süddeutsche Zeitung (SZ) with information related to the activities of Reinhard Gehlen (1902–1979). Gehlen, who was a prominent Nazi before World War II, became the leader of the CIA-affiliated, anti-communist, Gehlen Organisation (1946–56) and, later, from 1956 onwards the Head of the German Federal Intelligence Service (BND). According to the leaked documents, Reinhard Gehlen personally authorized the conduct of physical surveillance of Abendroth. According to a report on Gehlen's activities:

[t]he archive material includes a carefully composed dossier on the lawyer and political scientist Wolfgang Abendroth, who was banned from working as a legal trainee in 1933 due to his socialist leanings. A few years later, Abendroth was sent into a punishment battalion of the Wehrmacht active in the war in Greece. He deserted from the Army and joined the Greek resistance movement. After the war, he commenced teaching as a lecturer at the University of Leipzig. This was sufficient to place him in the first ranks of Reinhard Gehlen's list of "enemies of the state." Abendroth was surrounded by Gehlen's agents, who diligently sent their observations and notes to Gehlen, all of which are found in the 100,000 files of his private archive

== Death and legacy ==
Abendroth died on 15 September 1985 in Frankfurt am Main. The so-called 'Marburg School' he founded (also known as the "Abendroth School") included many prominent scholars who continued his political and academic legacy.

At the beginning of December 2007, it was announced that the "Association Alternative Work and Social Justice e.V." (WAsG e. V.) a left-leaning think tank" changed its name into Wolfgang Abendroth Foundation Society (Wolfgang-Abendroth-Stiftungs-Gesellschaft). Originally, the group had formed as a reaction to the government policy they criticized as neoliberal, in particular the package of measures referred to as Agenda 2010, of the red-green coalition. The association was disbanded in 2020.

A street in Wuppertal was given the name Wolfgang-Abendroth-Strasse, while in Marburg a bridge was named Wolfgang-Abendroth-Bridge. In the Marburg bridge, a plaque commemorates Abedroth's legacy with the words of Jürgen Habermas:

Partisanenprofessor im Land der Mitläufer

A Partisan Professor in the Land of Followers
