= Rebekka Habermas =

German historian (1959–2023)

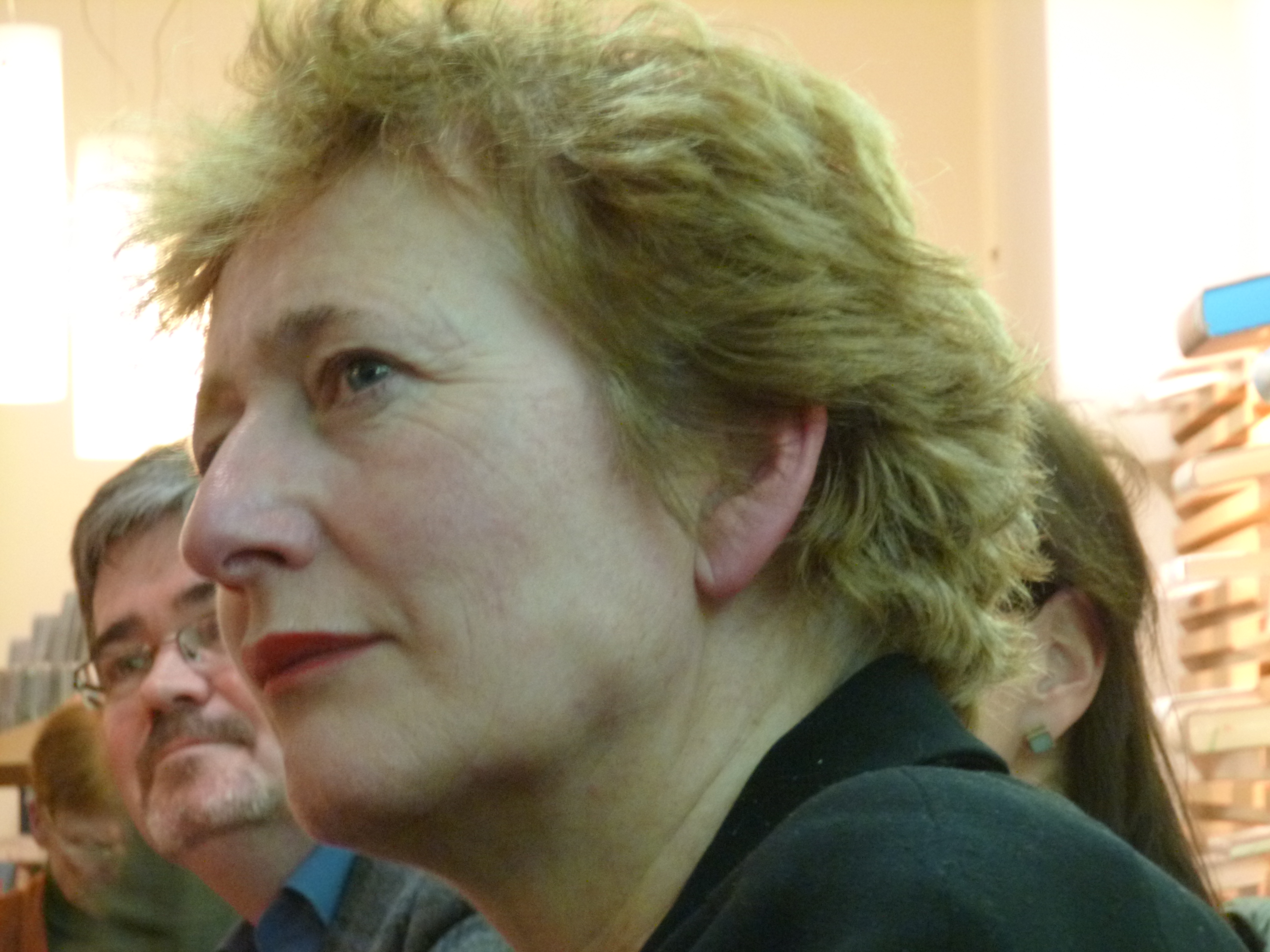
- Habermas in 2014
- Born: 3 July 1959; Frankfurt am Main, West Germany
- Died: 21 December 2023 (aged 64)
- Occupations: Historian; academic teacher
- Organisation: University of Göttingen
- Father: Jürgen Habermas

Rebekka Habermas (German: [ˈhaːbɐmaːs]; 3 July 1959 – 21 December 2023) was a German historian and professor of modern history at the University of Göttingen. Habermas made substantial contributions to German social and cultural history of the 19th century. She held visiting positions at universities in Paris, Oxford, Montreal and New York City, among others.

== Life and career ==
Rebekka Habermas was born in Frankfurt am Main, the daughter of philosopher and sociologist Jürgen Habermas. From 1979 to 1985, she studied history and Romance literature at the University of Konstanz, and in Paris, earning a master's degree and completing her Staatsexamen in Konstanz in 1985. She then received training in publishing and worked as an editor at S. Fischer Verlag. After earning her doctorate at Saarland University in 1990 under the auspices of the German National Academic Foundation, Habermas spent the next two years as an associate professor at Saarland University's historical institute. From 1992 to 1997, Habermas conducted research for Bielefeld University's special research project Sozialgeschichte des neuzeitlichen Bürgertums (Social History of the Modern Middle Class), which was financed through the Deutsche Forschungsgemeinschaft. In 1998, Habermas secured her habilitation from the faculty of history and philosophy at Bielefeld University. She then worked for two years as an interim full professor at Ruhr University, Bochum. From 2000, she held a chair in medieval and modern history at the University of Göttingen.

Rebekka Habermas died at the age of 64 on 21 December 2023, preceding her father's death by two years, two months, and twenty-one days.

== Work ==
Habermas' work focused on the history of the bourgeoisie, legal history, administration history, gender history, the history of criminality, and historical anthropology. In her research and books, she was aware of people and the conditions under which they acted. She introduced international research into Germany, for example translating the teaching of Michel Foucault with whom she had studied in Paris.

Habermas held a number of visiting appointments:

- Guest professor at the École des Hautes Études en Sciences Sociales in Paris (2002)
- Richard von Weizsäcker Fellow at St Antony's College of Oxford University (2010–2014)
- Visiting fellow at the University of Münster's excellence cluster "Religion und Politik" (2014)
- Fellow at the Lichtenberg-Kolleg, Göttingen's Institute for Advanced Study in the Humanities & Social Sciences (2014–2015)
- Guest professor at the Université de Montréal (spring semester, 2016)
- Theodor Heuss Professor at The New School in New York (autumn term, 2016)

From 2010, Habermas served as spokesperson for the research training group Dynamiken von Raum und Geschlecht (Dynamics of Space and Gender), funded by the Deutsche Forschungsgemeinschaft. In 2011, she received the Geisteswissenschaften International, a humanities prize awarded by the Börsenverein des Deutschen Buchhandels to support translation of distinguished academic books. In 2012, she was inducted into the Academia Europaea. Two years later, she received honorable mention in competition for the Chester Penn Higby Prize, an award bestowed biennially by the Journal of Modern History for the best essay published in the organ.

Habermas served as editor of the journal Historische Anthropologie and co-editor of the series Campus Historische Studien. In addition, she was a member of numerous research groups, including Historische Anthropologie, Geschlechterdifferenz in europäischen Rechtskulturen. She was a board member of Göttingen's Zentrum für Theorie und Methodik der Kulturwissenschaften, and a contributor to the conception and planning of Wolfgang Benz's series Europäische Geschichte. She sat on other commissions and juries as well, including the European Research Council's scientific review panel for social sciences and humanities.

== Publications ==
- Rebekka Habermas (1991). Wallfahrt und Aufruhr: Zur Geschichte des Wunderglaubens in der frühen Neuzeit (in German). Frankfurt/Main: Campus-Verl. ISBN 3-593-34570-6.
- —— (1993). "Geschlechtergeschichte und 'anthropology of gender'. Geschichte einer Begegnung". Historische Anthropologie (in German). 1 (3): 485–509. doi:10.7788/ha.1993.1.3.485. ISSN 0942-8704. S2CID 145049229.
- —— (1994). "Weibliche Religiosität – oder: Von der Fragilität bürgerlicher Identitäten". In Klaus Tenfelde; Hans-Ulrich Wehler (eds.). Wege zur Geschichte des Bürgertums (in German). Göttingen: Vandenhoeck und Ruprecht. pp. 125–148. ISBN 3-525-35673-0.
- —— (2000). "Rituale des Gefühls. Die Frömmigkeit des protestantischen Bürgertums". In Manfred Hettling; Stefan-Ludwig Hoffmann (eds.). Der Bürgerliche Wertehimmel (in German). Göttingen: Vandenhoeck und Ruprecht. pp. 169–192. ISBN 3-525-01385-X.
- —— (2000). Frauen und Männer des Bürgertums: Eine Familiengeschichte (1750–1850) (in German). Göttingen: Vandenhoeck und Ruprecht. ISBN 3-525-35679-X.
- —— (2006). "Frauen- und Geschlechtergeschichte". In Joachim Eibach; Günther Lottes (eds.). Kompass der Geschichtswissenschaft (in German). Göttingen: Vandenhoeck und Ruprecht. pp. 231–245. ISBN 3-8252-2271-3.
- —— (2006). "Eigentum vor Gericht. Die Entstehung des modernen Rechtsstaates aus dem Diebstahl?" (PDF). WerkstattGeschichte (in German). 15 (42): 25–44. ISSN 0933-5706.
- —— (2008). Diebe vor Gericht: Die Entstehung der modernen Rechtsordnung im 19. Jahrhundert (in German). Frankfurt, M.: Campus-Verl. ISBN 978-3-593-38774-1.
