= Cunning of reason =

Hegelian term

The cunning of reason (German: List der Vernunft) is a term coined by the German philosopher Georg Wilhelm Friedrich Hegel. Hegel understands it to mean a process through which a certain purpose is realized in human history that the people involved are not conscious of.

== Content and meaning ==
Hegel applies the term “cunning of reason” to the ultimate purpose of the world, the consciousness of the spirit of its freedom. The purpose represents what is rational in world-historical events and is realized through various human actions, which may also be driven by passions and particular interests. In this case, reason is so “cunning” as to allow passions to work for it, so that that “through which it brings itself into existence loses and suffers damage”. The “idea pays the tribute of existence and transience not from itself, but through the passions of individuals”.

The purpose establishes “an indirect relationship with the object” and “interposes another object between itself and the object”.

== The cunning of reason in history ==
According to Hegel, reason rules the world and gradually realizes itself through the unfolding of its concepts in world history, which, despite all adversities, is thus regarded as the rational, necessary course of the unfolding world spirit. It is “progress in the consciousness of freedom”, indeed “God's work itself”. Individuals act in the service of a higher necessity that they themselves do not understand, thus establishing the absolute right, true morality. Thus, it is the “cunning of reason that makes the interests and passions of individuals work for its purposes, fulfilling the will of the world spirit”.

According to Hegel, the world of concepts develops dialectically; concepts are interwoven, with each one encompassing the other and being determined by its relationship to it, its otherness. According to this theory of development, the Absolute unfolds as self-realization within history through the stages of in itself, for itself, and in and for itself.

The absolute spirit reveals itself over the millennia by being brought to light piece by piece through Wissenschaft as knowledge, as “that which exists in and of itself”, as the reign of the deity.

Nature is spirit in its self-alienated otherness, and God reveals himself in human history. Through the state to which they belong and for which they work, humans are subject to a historical destiny. Historical figures—such as Napoleon, the “world spirit on horseback”—have only a vague sense of what is objectively “of the times”. Thus, humans are assigned their tasks within the state and become its instruments.

The cunning of reason is thus usually referred to when individuals are unaware that they are instruments of these higher purposes and are being appropriated by history, which makes use of them. People may even believe that they are following their personal inclinations and purposes, such as their honor or their career, and that they are acting “freely”, but in fact they are acting as instruments of the absolute, of objective historical rationality.

The objective spirit realizes itself in world history, which, alongside law and ethical life (Sittlichkeit), is one of its manifestations. Even if, in the course of history, states wage war against each other, perish, or rise again, their representatives in world history are nothing more than organs of the world spirit, whose purposes they implement, even if they believe they are acting in a different interest. In this way, the cunning of reason makes the passions work for it.

== Freedom and necessity ==
Depending on their understanding of the processes involved, the acting person thus becomes a knowing or unknowing instrument of intentions above them. Their self-purposefulness, which still plays a major role in Kant's ethics, recedes into the background.

Hegel was accused from various quarters of absolutizing the state and neglecting the individual. Reference was made to differences between him and Enlightenment philosophers such as Rousseau and Kant, for whom human beings were never to be regarded merely as a means to an end, but always as an end in themselves.

Since in world history the subjective motives and objective purposes of action diverge and deeds, determined by the world spirit, are interwoven in overarching causal relationships (as in the webs of the Norns), freedom also has a different, less emphatic significance in Hegel than in Kant.

While Kant defined practical freedom individually and negatively as independence from heterogeneous determinants of “arbitrariness” and positively as self-determination of the individual, for Hegel it was objectified and generalized in the state: the state is the “reality of the ethical life idea”, the “idea of freedom is truly only as the state”. Compared to Kant, Hegel's concept of freedom thus refers to society, the state, in which freedom can be realized for everyone. After the French Revolution, the principle of freedom can only become a reality for all people in modern states. In the course of history, peoples and individuals are sacrificed to this goal of human liberation, and this sacrifice expresses the cunning of reason. General reason asserts itself immanently and necessarily against the interests of the individual.

Hegel's idea that the particular should be regarded as insignificant “in comparison with the universal”, that individuals should be “sacrificed and abandoned”, met with resistance, as did his notion that the idea pays “the tribute of existence and transience not from itself, but from the passions of individuals”. The Left Hegelians' criticism, as well as that of Karl Marx, was sparked by this objective, reconciliatory view of history. Roughly speaking, Marx adopted Hegel's dialectic as a principle of history, but freed it from the mystical idea of a world spirit and emphasized social and material conditions. It is not the cunning of reason or the world spirit, but human beings who determine the course of history with their labour.

Adorno's critique of Hegel and his rejection of the concept of the cunning of reason would later build on this.

Despite all criticism, for Hegel human beings are not mere puppets; their personal conscience remains decisive and untouchable, as the repository of their guilt and value.
