= Communicative action =

Aspect of sociology

In sociology, communicative action is cooperative action undertaken by individuals based upon mutual deliberation and argumentation. The term was developed by German philosopher-sociologist Jürgen Habermas in his work The Theory of Communicative Action.

== Structures ==
Communicative action for Habermas is possible given human capacity for rationality. Habermas says rationality is a capacity inherent within language, especially in the form of argumentation. "We use the term argumentation for that type of speech in which participants thematize contested validity claims and attempt to vindicate or criticize them through argumentation." The structures of argumentative speech, which Habermas identifies as the absence of coercive force, the mutual search for understanding, and the compelling power of the better argument, form the key features from which intersubjective rationality can make communication possible. Action undertaken by participants through a process of such argumentative communication can be assessed as to their rationality to the extent which they fulfill those criteria.

Communicative rationality is distinct from instrumental, normative, and dramaturgical rationality by its ability to concern all three "worlds" as he terms them, following Karl Popper—the subjective, objective, and intersubjective or social. Communicative rationality is self-reflexive and open to dialogue in which participants in an argument can learn from others and from themselves by reflecting upon their premises and thematizing aspects of their cultural background knowledge to question suppositions that typically go without question.

Communicative action is action based upon this deliberative process, where two or more individuals interact and coordinate their action based upon agreed interpretations of the situation. Communicative action is distinguished by Habermas from other forms of action, such as instrumental action, which is pure goal-oriented behavior, dealt with primarily in economics, by taking all functions of language into consideration. That is, communicative action has the ability to reflect upon language used to express propositional truth, normative value, or subjective self-expression.

== Social implications ==
Much of Habermas' work has been in response to his predecessors in the Frankfurt School. Communicative rationality, for instance, can be seen as a response to the critique of enlightenment reason expressed in Max Horkheimer and T.W. Adorno's Dialectic of Enlightenment. Horkheimer and Adorno had argued that the Enlightenment saw a particular kind of rationality enshrined as dominant in western culture, instrumental reason, which had only made possible the more effective and ruthless manipulation of nature and human beings themselves. Habermas' form of critical theory is designed to rediscover through the analysis of positive potentials for human rationality in the medium of language, the possibility of a critical form of reason that can lead to reflection and examination of not only objective questions, but also those of social norms, human values, and even aesthetic expression of subjectivity.

Habermas' earlier work, The Structural Transformation of the Public Sphere, anticipates his concern for argumentation and can be read retrospectively as a historical case study of Western European societies institutionalizing aspects of communicative action in the political and social spheres. Habermas notes the rise of institutions of public debate in late seventeenth and eighteenth century Britain and France especially. In these nations, information exchange and communication methods pioneered by capitalist merchants became adapted to novel purposes and were employed as an outlet for the public use of reason. The notion of communicative rationality in the public sphere is therefore heavily indebted to Immanuel Kant's formulation of the public use of reason in What is Enlightenment? Habermas argues that the bourgeoisie who participated in this incipient public sphere universalized those aspects of their class that enabled them to present the public sphere as inclusive—he even goes so far as to say that a public sphere that operates upon principles of exclusivity is not a public sphere at all. The focus on foundations of democracy established in this work carried over to his later examination in The Theory of Communicative Action that greater democratization and the reduction to barriers to participation in public discourse (some of which he identified in the first public sphere of the Enlightenment) could open the door to a more open form of social action. The shift from a more Marxist focus on the economic bases of discourse in Structural Transformation to a more "super-structural" emphasis on language and communication in Theory of Communicative Action signals Habermas' transition to a post-Marxist framework.

== Critiques ==
Habermas views communication and debate in the public sphere as argumentatively meritocratic. Critics have argued that Habermas' notion of communicative rationality, upon which communicative action must be based, is illusory. The formal prerequisites of equality among argument participants, for instance, may mask the reality of unequal social capital. "There is no guarantee that a formally symmetrical distribution of opportunities to select and employ speech acts will result in anything more than an expression of the status quo." Historian Ian McNeeley, for instance, contrasts Habermas' view with Michel Foucault's notion of communication as embodying pre-existing power relationships: "Jürgen Habermas subscribes to an unrealistic ideal of power-free communication...Michel Foucault remedies this idealism by treating knowledge as power; his work is in fact suffused with applications of knowledge for the control of human bodies." In a like manner, the discursive fiction of consensus achieved through rational argumentation might be used as a legitimating prop for social action to the detriment of marginalized members-this is the basis of much feminist critique of Habermas' notions.

Another radical critique is that of Nikolas Kompridis, a former student of Habermas, who views Habermas' theory as another attempt to arrive at a "view from nowhere", this time by locating rationality in procedures of reaching agreement independent of any particular participants' perspective or background. In response, he proposes a "possibility-disclosing" role of reason to correct the problems with Habermas' work.

== See also ==
- Discourse analysis
- Lifeworld
