= Carmen Bernabé Ubieta =

Spanish theologian

Carmen Bernabé Ubieta (born 1957, in Bilbao) is a theologian, specialising in biblical theology, including Joanic Studies, Early Christianity, and Women and Christianity. Since 1990, Bernabé is a lecturer in Theology at the Universidad de Deusto, in Bilbao, Basque Country, Spain.

Her work is best known for her revisions of the Joanic tradition, and her research on feminist theology, but she has also written on post-colonial readings of early Christian texts, and a wide range of other areas. In her discussion of Apocalyptic narratives in Early Christian communities, for example, she has analysed the development of "a political theology of active non-violent resistance" whereby symbolism and imagery encode "a critique, and a stern condemnation, of the totalitarian system of Imperial Rome, its values, its methods, its claim to divinity".

Bernabé publishes mostly in Spanish. Her publications include the monographs 'Mary Magdalen: Traditions in Early Christianity' (1994), 'Between the Kitchen and the Town Square: Woman in Early Christianity' (1998),'Distinct and Distinguished: Women in the Bible and in History' (1995, with Mercedes Navarro), and numerous edited collections, and scholarly essays. Her most recent publications deal with the Joanic tradition and the historical traces of Mary Magdalen, in "'Recalling the spirit to reach the whole truth': Memory and Re-Readings in John's Gospel" (2017), and "Mary Magdalen, Apostle" (2016).

Bernabé is Director of the Spanish Biblical Association/Asociación Bíblica Española (ABE) since 2016 to 2022, having acted as assistant director since 2012-16. She was President of the Spanish Association of Women Theologians/Asociación de Teólogas Españolas (ATE) in 2010-16, having been a founding member since 1992.

Bernabé also works as general editor for the collection Aletheia (EVD), linked to ATE, and specialising on feminist theology. She was part of the Editorial team of the collection Deusto Theological Notebooks/ Cuadernos Teología Deusto (1995-2009), and General Editor of the collection in 2006-2009. In addition, Bernabé is co-editor of the Biblical Studies/ Estudios Bíblicos journal since 2010, and was General Editor of ABE publications in 2010- 2016.
