= The Age of the World Picture =

1938 lecture by German philosopher Martin Heidegger

"The Age of the World Picture" or "The Age of the World View" (German: Die Zeit des Weltbildes) is a 1938 lecture by Martin Heidegger in which he addresses the metaphysical ground of modern science. It was published in the essay collection Off the Beaten Track in 1950.

== English translations ==
The essay has been translated as "The Age of the World View" by Marjorie Grene (1951) and as "The Age of the World Picture" by William Lovitt (1977) and Julian Young (2002).

== Critique ==
Sidonie Kellerer believes that Heidegger published the text to show his “inner resistance” after the mid-1930s against the Nazi regime and as evidence for his early refusal of National Socialism and his rejection of a modern ideology that resulted in the totalitarian system. Emphasizing the differences between the published text and the original lecture delivered in 1938, she thinks that the differences show "the artful falsifications" used by Heidegger in order to re-establish his reputation.
