= Universal pragmatics =

Field of study in philosophy

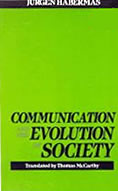
Jürgen Habermas (1979): Communication and the Evolution of Society – the book that universal pragmatics appears in

Universal pragmatics (UP), also formal pragmatics, is the philosophical study of the necessary conditions for reaching an understanding through communication. The philosopher Jürgen Habermas coined the term in his essay "What is Universal Pragmatics?" where he suggests that human competition, conflict, and strategic action are attempts to achieve understanding that have failed because of modal confusions. The implication is that coming to terms with how people understand or misunderstand one another could lead to a reduction of social conflict.

By coming to an "understanding," he means at the very least when two or more social actors share the same meanings about certain words or phrases; and at the very most when these actors are confident that those meanings fit relevant social expectations (or a "mutually recognized normative background").

For Habermas, the goal of coming to an understanding is "intersubjective mutuality ... shared knowledge, mutual trust, and accord with one another". In other words, the underlying goal of coming to an understanding would help to foster the enlightenment, consensus, and goodwill necessary for establishing socially beneficial norms. Habermas' goal is not primarily for subjective feeling alone but for the development of shared (intersubjective) norms which in turn establish the social coordination needed for practical action in pursuit of shared and individual objectives (a form of action termed "communicative action").

As an interdisciplinary subject, universal pragmatics draws upon material from a large number of fields, from pragmatics, semantics, semiotics, informal logic, and the philosophy of language, through social philosophy, sociology, and symbolic interactionism, to ethics, especially discourse ethics, and on to epistemology and the philosophy of mind.

== History ==
Universal pragmatics (UP) is part of a larger project to rethink the relationship between philosophy and the individual sciences during a period of social crisis. The project is within the tradition of Critical Theory, a program that traces back to the work of Max Horkheimer.

UP shares with speech act theory, semiotics, and linguistics an interest in the details of language use and communicative action. However, unlike those fields, it insists on a difference between the linguistic data that we observe in the 'analytic' mode, and the rational reconstruction of the rules of symbol systems that each reader/listener possesses intuitively when interpreting strings of words. In this sense, it is an examination of the two ways that language usage can be analyzed: as an object of scientific investigation, and as a 'rational reconstruction' of intuitive linguistic 'know-how'.

== Goals and methods ==
Universal pragmatics is associated with the philosophical method of rational reconstruction.

The basic concern in universal pragmatics is utterances (or speech acts) in general. This is in contrast to most other fields of linguistics, which tend to be more specialized, focusing exclusively on very specific sorts of utterances such as sentences (which in turn are made up of words, morphemes, and phonemes).

For Habermas, the most significant difference between a sentence and an utterance is in that sentences are judged according to how well they make sense grammatically, while utterances are judged according to their communicative validity (see section 1). (1979:31)

Universal pragmatics is also distinct from the field of sociolinguistics, because universal pragmatics is only interested in the meanings of utterances if they have to do with claims about truth or rightness, while sociolinguistics is interested in all utterances in their social contexts. (1979:31, 33)

== Three aspects of universal pragmatics ==
There are three ways to evaluate an utterance, according to UP. There are theories that deal with elementary propositions, theories of first-person sentences, and theories of speech acts.

A theory of elementary propositions investigates those things in the real world that are being referenced by an utterance, and the things that are implied by an utterance, or predicate it. For example, the utterance "The first Prime Minister of Canada" refers to a man who went by the name of Sir John A. Macdonald. And when a speaker delivers the utterance, "My husband is a lawyer", it implies that the speaker is married to a man.

A theory of first-person sentences examines the expression of the intentions of the actor(s) through language and in the first-person.

Finally, a theory of speech acts examines the setting of standards for interpersonal relations through language. The basic goal of speech act theory is to explain how and when utterances in general are performative. (1979:34) Central to the notion of speech acts are the ideas of illocutionary force and perlocutionary force, both terms coined by philosopher J.L. Austin. Illocutionary force describes the intent of the speaker, while perlocutionary force means the effect an utterance has in the world, or more specifically, the effect on others.

A performative utterance is a sentence where an action being performed is done by the utterance itself. For example: "I inform you that you have a moustache", or "I promise you I will not burn down the house". In these cases, the words are also taken as significant actions: the act of informing and promising (respectively).

Habermas adds to this the observation that speech acts can either succeed or fail, depending on whether or not they succeed on influencing another person in the intended way. (1979:35)

This last method of evaluation—the theory of speech acts—is the domain that Habermas is most interested in developing as a theory of communicative action.

== Communicative action ==
There are a number of ways to approach Habermas's project of developing a formal pragmatic analysis of communication. Because Habermas developed it in order to have a normative and philosophical foundation for his critical social theory, most of the inroads into formal pragmatics start from sociology, specifically with what is called action theory. Action theory concerns the nature of human action, especially the manner in which collective actions are coordinated in a functioning society.

The coordination and integration of social action have been explained in many ways by many theories. Rational choice theory and game theory are two examples, which describe the integration of individuals into social groups by detailing the complex manner in which individuals motivated only by self-interest will form mutually beneficial and cooperative social arrangements. In contrast to these, Habermas has formulated a theory of communicative action. (Habermas 1984; 1987) This theory and the project of developing a formal pragmatic analysis of communication are inseparable.

Habermas makes a series of distinctions in the service of explaining social action. The first major differentiation he makes is between two social realms, the system and the lifeworld. These designate two distinct modes of social integration:

- The kind of social integration accomplished in the system is accomplished through the functional integration of the consequences of actions. It bypasses the consciousness of individuals and does not depend upon their being oriented towards acting collectively. Economic and industrial systems are great examples, often producing complex forms of social integration and interdependence despite the openly competitive orientations of individuals.
- The social integration accomplished in the lifeworld, by contrast, depends upon the coordination of action plans and the conscious action-orientations of individuals. It relies on processes of human interaction involving symbolic and cultural forms of meaning. More specifically, as Habermas maintains, the coordination of the lifeworld is accomplished through communicative action.

Thus, communicative action is an indispensable facet of society. It is at the heart of the lifeworld and is, Habermas claims, responsible for accomplishing several fundamental social functions: reaching understanding, cultural reproduction, coordinating action plans, and socializing individuals.

However, Habermas is quick to note, different modes of interaction can (in some ways) facilitate these social functions and achieve integration within the lifeworld. This points towards the second key distinction Habermas makes, which differentiates communicative action from strategic action. The coordination of action plans, which constitutes the social integration of the lifeworld, can be accomplished either through consensus or influence.

Strategic action is action-oriented towards success, while communicative action is action-oriented towards understanding. Both involve the symbolic resources of the lifeworld and occur primarily by way of linguistic interaction. On the one hand, actors employing communicative actions draw on the uniquely impelling force of mutual understanding to align the orientation of their action plans. It is this subtle but insistent binding force of communicative interactions that opens the door to an understanding of their meanings. On the other hand, actors employing strategic actions do not exploit the potential of communication that resides in the mutual recognition of a shared action-oriented understanding. Instead, strategic actors relate to others with no intention of reaching consensus or mutual understanding, but only the intention of accomplishing pre-determined ends unrelated to reaching an understanding. Strategic action often involves the use of communicative actions to achieve the isolated intentions of individuals, manipulating shared understanding in the service of private interests. Thus, Habermas claims, strategic action is parasitic on communicative action, which means communicative action is the primary mode of linguistic interaction. Reaching a reciprocally defined understanding is communication's basic function.

Keeping in mind this delineation of the object domain, the formal pragmatics of communication can be more readily laid out. The essential insight has already been mentioned, which is that communication is responsible for irreplaceable modes of social integration, and this is accomplished through the unique binding force of a shared understanding. This is, in a sense, the pragmatic piece of formal pragmatics: communication does something in the world. What needs to be explained are the conditions for the possibility of what communication already does. This is, in a sense, the formal piece of formal pragmatics: a rational reconstruction of the deep generative structures that are the universal conditions for the possibility of a binding and compelling mutual understanding.

From here, Habermas heads the analysis in two directions. In one direction is a kind of linguistic analysis (of speech acts), which can be placed under the heading of the validity dimensions of communication. The other direction entails a categorization of the idealized presuppositions of communication.

=== Communicative competence ===
Habermas argues that when speakers are communicating successfully, they will have to defend their meaning by using these four claims.

1. That they have uttered something understandably — or their statements are intelligible;
2. That they have given other people something to understand — or are speaking something true;
3. That the speaker is therefore understandable — or their intentions are recognized and appreciated for what they are; and,
4. That they have come to an understanding with another person — or, they have used words that both actors can agree upon. (1979:4)

Habermas is emphatic that these claims are universal—no human communication oriented at achieving mutual understanding could possibly fail to raise all of these validity claims. Additionally, to illustrate that all other forms of communication are derived from that which is oriented toward mutual understanding, he argues that there are no other kinds of validity claims whatsoever. This is important because it is the basis of Habermas' critique of postmodernism.

The fundamental orientation toward mutual understanding is at the heart of universal pragmatics, as Habermas explains:

"The task of universal pragmatics is to identify and reconstruct universal conditions of possible mutual understanding... other forms of social action—for example, conflict, competition, strategic action in general—are derivatives of action-oriented toward reaching understanding. Furthermore, since language is the specific medium of reaching understanding at the sociocultural stage of evolution, I want to go a step further and single out explicit speech actions from other forms of communicative action."

Any meaning that meets the above criteria, and is recognized by another as meeting the criteria, is considered "vindicated" or communicatively competent.

In order for anyone to speak validly — and therefore, to have his or her comments vindicated, and therefore reach a genuine consensus and understanding — Habermas notes that a few more fundamental commitments are required. First, he notes, actors have to treat this formulation of validity so seriously that it might be a precondition for any communication at all. Second, he asserts that all actors must believe that their claims are able to meet these standards of validity. And third, he insists that there must be a common conviction among actors that all validity claims are either already vindicated or could be vindicated.

=== Examining the validity of speech ===
Habermas claims that communication rests upon a non-egoistic understanding of the world, which is an idea he borrowed from thinkers like Jean Piaget. A subject capable of a de-centered understanding can take up three fundamentally different attitudes to the world. Habermas refers to such attitudes as dimensions of validity. Specifically, this means individuals can recognize different standards for validity—i.e., that the validation of an empirical truth claim requires different methods and procedures than the validation of subjective truthfulness, and that both of those require different methods and procedures of validation than claims to normative rightness.

These dimensions of validity can be summarized as claims to truth (IT), truthfulness (I), and rightness (WE). So the ability to differentiate between the attitudes (and their respective "worlds") mentioned above should be understood as an ability to distinguish between types of validity claims.

M. Cooke provided the only book-length treatment of Habermas's communication theory. Cooke explains:

"when we adopt an objectifying attitude we relate, in the first instance to the objective world of facts and existing states of affairs [IT]; when we adopt a norm-conformative attitude we relate, in the first instance, to the social world of normatively regulated interactions [WE]; when we adopt an expressive attitude we relate, in the first instance to the subjective world of inner experience [I]". (Cooke 1994)

This is fundamental to Habermas's analysis of communication. He maintains that the performance of any speech act necessarily makes reference to these dimensions of validity, by raising at least three validity claims.

One way to grasp this idea is to take an inventory of the ways in which an attempt at communication can misfire, the ways a speech act can fail. A hearer may reject the offering of a speech act on the grounds that it is invalid because it:

1. presupposes or explicates states of affairs which are not the case (IT);
2. does not conform to accepted normative expectations (WE);
3. raises doubts about the intentions or sincerity of the speaker (I).

Of course, from this, it follows that a hearer who accepts the offering of a speech act does so on the grounds that it is valid because it:

1. presupposes or explicates states of affairs that are true (IT);
2. conforms to accepted normative expectations (WE);
3. raises no doubts concerning the intentions or sincerity of the speaker (I).

This means that when engaging in communication the speaker and hearer are inescapably oriented to the validity of what is said. A speech act can be understood as an offering, the success or failure of which depends upon the hearer's response of either accepting or rejecting the validity claims it raises. The three dimensions of validity pointed out above are implicated in any attempt at communication.

Thus, communication relies on its being embedded within relations to various dimensions of validity. Any and every speech act is infused with inter-subjectively recognized claims to be valid. This implicitly ties communication to argumentation and various discursive procedures for the redemption of validity claims. This is true because to raise a validity claim in communication is to simultaneously imply that one is able to show, if challenged, that one's claim is justified. Communication is possible because speakers are accountable for the validity of what they say. This assumption of responsibility on the part of the speaker is described by Habermas as a "warranty", because in most cases the validity claims raised during communication are taken as justified, and communication proceeds on that basis. Similarly, hearers are accountable for their stance taken up in relation to the validity claims raised by the speaker. Both speaker and hearer are bound to the validity claims raised by the utterances they share during communication. They are bound by the weak obligations inherent in pursuing actions oriented towards reaching an understanding. Habermas would claim that this obligation is a rational one:

"With every speech act, by virtue of the validity claims it raises, the speaker enters into an interpersonal relationship of mutual obligation with the hearer: The speaker is obliged to support her claims with reasons if challenged, and the hearer is obliged to accept a claim unless he has good reason not to do so. The obligation in question is, in the first instance, not a moral one but a rational one -- the penalty of failure to fulfill it is the charge not of immorality but of irrationality -- although clearly the two will often overlap" (Cooke, 1994).

This begins to point towards the idea of communicative rationality, which is the potential for rationality that is implicit in the validity basis of everyday communication, the shape of reason that can be extracted from Habermas's formal-pragmatic analyses.

"The modern -- decentered -- understanding of the world has opened up different dimensions of validity; to the extent that each dimension of validity has its own standards of truth and falsity and its own modes of justification for determining these, one may say that what has been opened up are dimensions of rationality" (Cooke, 1994).

However, before the idea of communicative rationality can be described, the other direction of Habermas's formal pragmatic analyses of communication needs to be explained. This direction looks towards the idealized presuppositions of communication.

=== Ideal presuppositions of communication ===
When individuals pursue actions oriented towards reaching an understanding, the speech acts they exchange take on the weight of a mutually recognized validity. This means each actor involved in communication takes the other as accountable for what they have said, which implies that good reasons could be given by all to justify the validity of the understanding that is being achieved. Again, in most situations, the redemption of validity claims is not an explicit undertaking (except in discourses, see below). Instead, each actor issues a "warranty" of accountability to the other, which only needs to be redeemed if certain validity claims are thrown into question. This suggests that the validity claims raised in every communicative interaction implicitly tie communication to argumentation.

It is here that the idealized presuppositions of communication arise. Habermas claims that all forms of argumentation, even implicit and rudimentary ones, rest upon certain "idealizing suppositions," which are rooted in the very structures of action-oriented towards understanding. These "strong idealizations" are always understood as at least approximately satisfied by participants in situations where argumentation (and communication) is thought to be taking place. Thus, when during communication it is discovered that the belief that these presuppositions are satisfied is not justified it is always taken as problematic. As a result, steps are usually taken to reestablish and maintain the belief that they are approximately satisfied, or communication is simply called off.

1. The most basic of these idealized presuppositions is the presupposition that participants in communicative exchange are using the same linguistic expressions in the same way. This is an obvious but interesting point, which clearly illustrates what an idealized presupposition is. It is a presupposition because communication would not proceed if those involved did not think it was at least approximately satisfied (in this case that a shared language was being used). It is idealized because no matter how closely it is approximated it is always counterfactual (because, in this case, the fact is that all meanings are to some degree personally defined).
2. Another, basic idealized presupposition of argumentation is the presupposition that no relevant argument is suppressed or excluded by the participants.
3. Another is the presupposition that no persuasive force except that of the better argument is exerted.
4. There is also the presupposition that all the participants are motivated only by a concern for the better argument.
5. There is the presupposition of attributing a context-transcending significance to validity claims. This presupposition is controversial but important (and becomes expanded and clarified in the presuppositions of discourse, see below). The idea is that participants in communication instill their claims with a validity that is understood to have significance beyond the specific context of their agreement.
6. The presupposition that no validity claim is exempt in principle from critical evaluation in argumentation;
7. The presupposition that everyone capable of speech and action is entitled to participate, and everyone is equally entitled to introduce new topics or express attitudes needs or desires.

In sum, all these presuppositions must be assumed to be approximately satisfied in any situation of communication, despite their being necessarily counterfactual. Habermas refers to the positing of these idealized presuppositions as the "simultaneously unavoidable and trivial accomplishments that sustain communicative action and argumentation".

Habermas calls discourses those forms of communication that come sufficiently close to actually satisfying these presuppositions. Discourses often occur within institutionalized forms of argumentation that self-reflectively refine their procedures of communication, and as a result, have a more rigorous set of presuppositions in addition to the ones listed above.

A striking feature of discourse is that validity claims tend to be explicitly thematized and there is the presupposition that all possible interlocutors would agree to the universal validity of the conclusions reached. Habermas especially highlights this in what he calls theoretical discourses and practical discourses. These are tied directly to two of the three dimensions of validity discussed above: theoretical discourse being concerned with validity claims thematized regarding objective states of affairs (IT); practical discourse being concerned with validity claims thematized concerning the rightness of norms governing social interactions (WE).

Habermas understands presupposition (5) to be responsible for generating the self-understanding and continuation of theoretical and practical discourses. Presupposition (5) points out that the validity of an understanding reached in theoretical or practical discourse, concerning some factual knowledge or normative principle, is always expanded beyond the immediate context in which it is achieved. The idea is that participants in discourses such as these presuppose that any understanding reached could attain universal agreement concerning its universal validity if these discourses could be relieved of the constraints of time and space. This idealized presupposition directs discourses concerning truth and normative certainty beyond the contingencies of specific communicative situations and towards the idealized achievements of universal consensus and universal validity. It is a rational reconstruction of the conditions for the possibility of earnest discourses concerning facts and norms. Recall that, for Habermas, rational reconstructions aim at offering the most acceptable account of what allows for the competencies already mastered by a wide range of subjects. In order for discourse to proceed, the existence of facts and norms must be presupposed, yet the certainty of an absolute knowledge of them must be, in a sense, postponed.

Striking a Piagetian and Peircean chord, Habermas understands the deep structures of collective inquiry as developmental. Thus, the presupposition shared by individuals involved in discourse is taken to reflect this. The pursuit of truth and normative certainty is taken to be motivated and grounded, not in some objective or social world that is treated as a "given", but rather in a learning process. Indeed, Habermas himself is always careful to formulate his work as a research project, open to refinement.

In any case, reconstructing the presuppositions and validity dimensions inherent to communication is valuable because it brings into relief the inescapable foundations of everyday practices. Communicative action and the rudimentary forms of argumentation that orient the greater part of human interaction cannot be left behind. By reconstructing the deep structures of these Habermas has discovered a seed of rationality planted in the very heart of the lifeworld. Everyday practices, which are common enough to be trivial, such as reaching an understanding with another, or contesting the reasons for pursuing a course of action, contain an implicit and idealized rationality.

In other words, communication is always somewhat rational. Communication could not occur if the participants thought that the speech acts exchanged did not carry the weight of validity for which those participating could be held accountable. Nor would anyone feel that a conclusion was justified if it was achieved by any other means than the uncoerced force of the better argument. Nor could the specialized discourses of law, science and morality continue if the progress of knowledge and insight was denied in favor of relativism.

==== Criticism ====
It is a question of how appropriate it is to speak of "communication" without tense, and of "everyday practices" as though they cut across all times and cultures. That they do cannot be assumed, and anthropology provides evidence of significant difference. It is possible to ignore these facts by limiting the scope of universal pragmatics to current forms of discourse, but this runs the risk of contradicting Habermas's own demand for (5). Moreover, the initial unease with the classical and liberal views of rationality had to do precisely with their ahistorical character and refusal, or perhaps inability, to acknowledge their own origins in circumstances of the day. Their veneer of false universality torn off by the likes of Foucault, it remains to be seen whether "universal" pragmatics can stand up to the same challenges posed by deconstruction and skepticism.

== See also ==
- Meaning-making

== Sources ==
- Cooke, M (1994). Language and Reason: A Study in Habermas's Pragmatics. Cambridge, MA: MIT Press.
- Habermas, Jürgen (1979). Communication and the Evolution of Society. Toronto: Beacon Press.
- Habermas, Jürgen (1987). The Theory of Communicative Action, Vol 2: Lifeworld and System: A Critique of Functionalist Reason. T. McCarthy. Boston: Beacon Press.
- Habermas, Jürgen; C. Lenhardt; S. Nicholsen (1990). Moral Consciousness and Communicative Action. Cambridge, MA: MIT Press.
- Habermas, Jürgen; C. Lenhardt; S. Nicholsen (1990a). "Philosophy as Stand-in Interpreter". Moral Consciousness and Communicative Action. Cambridge, MA: MIT Press. pp. 1–21.
- Habermas, Jürgen; C. Lenhardt; S. Nicholsen (1990b). "Reconstruction and Interpretation in the Social Sciences". Moral Consciousness and Communicative Action. Cambridge, MA: MIT Press. pp. 21–43.
- Habermas, Jürgen (1992). Themes in Post-Metaphysical Thinking: Philosophical Essays. W. Hohengarten. Cambridge, MA: MIT Press. pp. 28–57.
