= Aletheia =

Philosophical term for disclosure

Aletheia (/ælɪˈθaɪ.ə/; Ancient Greek: ἀλήθεια) is truth or disclosure in philosophy. Originating in Ancient Greek philosophy, the term was explicitly used for the first time in the history of philosophy by Parmenides in his poem On Nature, in which he contrasts it with doxa (opinion).

It was revived in the works of 20th-century philosopher Martin Heidegger. Although it is often translated as "truth", Heidegger argued that it is distinct from common conceptions of truth.

== Antiquity ==
Aletheia is variously translated as "unconcealedness", "disclosure", "revealing", or "unhiddenness". It also means "reality". It is the antonym of lethe, which literally means "forgetting", "forgetfulness".

In Greek mythology, aletheia was personified as a Greek goddess, Aletheia, the personification of truth. Pindar calls her a daughter of Zeus, and Plutarch describes her as the nurturer of the young Apollo. The Romans considered her the daughter of either Saturn or Tempus ('Time'). Her Roman equivalent is Veritas.

== In the Bible ==
The Septuagint uses the word Aletheia to translate the Hebrew words 'emet (אֱמֶת - firmness, solidity) and 'emunah (אֱמוּנָה - faithfulness, integrity).

Aletheia is used within the synoptic Gospels alongside derivative forms ἀληθῶς (alēthōs), ἀληθής (alēthēs) and ἀληθινός (alēthinos), often in dialogue affirming the validity and certainty of a story or teaching.

Within the Gospel of John, the word ‘Aletheia’ is used to refer to Jesus and his message. Aletheia takes on the meaning of spiritual truth, connoting a clear view of divine reality, a holy way of life, and the intangible yet pervasive ‘spirit’ of truth.

== Heidegger and aletheia ==
A painting that reveals (aletheia) a whole world. Heidegger mentions this particular work of Van Gogh's (Pair of Shoes, 1895) in The Origin of the Work of Art.

In the early to mid 20th-century, Martin Heidegger brought renewed attention to the concept of aletheia, by relating it to the notion of disclosure, or the way in which things appear as entities in the world. While he initially referred to aletheia as "truth", specifically a form that is pre-Socratic in origin, Heidegger eventually corrected this interpretation, writing:

Aletheia, disclosure ("Unverborgenheit"), regarded as the opening (Lichtung) of presence ("Anwesenheit") is not yet truth ("Wahrheit"). Is therefore aletheia something less than truth? Or is it more because it first grants truth as adaequatio and certitudo, because there can be no presence and presenting outside of the realm of the opening? (…) To raise the question of aletheia, of disclosure as such, is not the same as raising the question of "truth". For this reason, it was inadequate and misleading to call aletheia, in the sense of opening, truth.

Heidegger gave an etymological analysis of aletheia and drew out an understanding of the term as "unconcealedness". Thus, aletheia is distinct from conceptions of truth understood as statements which accurately describe a state of affairs (correspondence), or statements which fit properly into a system taken as a whole (coherence). Instead, Heidegger focused on the elucidation of how an ontological "world" is disclosed, or opened up, in which things are made intelligible for human beings in the first place, as part of a holistically structured background of meaning.

Heidegger began his discourse on the reappropriation of aletheia in his magnum opus, Being and Time (1927), and expanded on the concept in his Introduction to Metaphysics. For more on his understanding of aletheia, see Poetry, Language, Thought, in particular the essay entitled The Origin of the Work of Art, which describes the value of the work of art as a means to open a "clearing" for the appearance of things in the world, or to disclose their meaning for human beings. Heidegger revised his views on aletheia as truth, after nearly forty years, in the essay "The End of Philosophy and the Task of Thinking," in On Time and Being.

== See also ==
- Alethiology
- Alethic modality and Alethic logic
- Alethic possibility
- Alethic relativism
- Anamnesis (philosophy)
- Epistemology
- Neorealism (art)
- Reflective disclosure
- Truth § Ancient Greek philosophy
- 259 Aletheia
