= Heidegger's Later Philosophy =

2001 book by Julian Young

- Author: Julian Young
- Language: English
- Subject: Martin Heidegger
- Publisher: Cambridge University Press
- Publication date: November 2001
- Publication place: United Kingdom
- Pages: 148
- ISBN: 9780521809221

Heidegger's Later Philosophy is a 2001 book by the American writer Julian Young.

== Summary ==
The book is about the works the German philosopher Martin Heidegger wrote after 1936. Young argues these are of particular value for their offering of a viable approach to life and death in the contemporary world, without metaphysics which Heidegger considered a fundamental error. The book was preceded by Young's Heidegger, Philosophy, Nazism (1997) and Heidegger's Philosophy of Art (2001), concluding a trilogy of books about Heidegger's thought published by Cambridge University Press.

== Reception ==
Daniel O. Dahlstrom wrote that it is not necessary to read Young's earlier books about Heidegger before Heidegger's Later Philosophy. He called it a "vibrant defense of Heidegger’s later philosophy" with three main merits: "its remarkably lucid style and economical structure", "its attempt to demonstrate the unity of Heidegger’s later philosophy" and "its appreciation of Heidegger’s restrained confidence in the concrete power of human thinking". Miles Groth called it a "small but rich volume" with "a number of fresh interpretations of familiar themes in Heidegger scholarship".
