= Off the Beaten Track (essay collection) =

1950 essay collection by Martin Heidegger

- Title page for Holzwege
- Author: Martin Heidegger
- Original title: Holzwege
- Translator: Julian Young; Kenneth Haynes
- Language: German
- Publisher: Verlag Vittorio Klostermann
- Publication date: 1950
- Publication place: West Germany
- English publication date: August 2002
- Pages: 345

Off the Beaten Track (German: Holzwege) is a 1950 essay collection by the German philosopher Martin Heidegger. It consists of six essays originally published or delivered as lectures from 1935 to 1946. The recurring subjects are the history of metaphysics and the search for alternatives. "The Age of the World Picture", originally a 1938 lecture, was revised for the book to stand further away from National Socialism.

== Title ==
The German title Holzwege literally means 'woodway', a path through a forest, but is used in German idiomatically to mean "the wrong path or road". Heidegger explains the title thus:

"Wood" is an old name for forest. In the wood there are paths, mostly overgrown, that come to an abrupt stop where the wood is untrodden. They are called Holzwege.

Each goes its separate way, though within the same forest. It often appears as if one is identical to another. But it only appears so.

Woodcutters and forest keepers know these paths. They know what it means to be on a Holzweg.

== Contents ==
English title	German title	Orig. year
"The Origin of the Work of Art"	"Der Ursprung des Kunstwerkes"	1935–6
"The Age of the World Picture"	"Die Zeit des Weltbildes"	1938
"Hegel's Concept of Experience"	"Hegels Begriff der Erfahrung"	1942–3
"Nietzsche's Word: 'God Is Dead'"	"Nietzsches Wort 'Gott ist tot'"	1943
"Why Poets?"	"Wozu Dichter?"	1946
"Anaximander's Saying"	"Der Spruch des Anaximander"	1946
