= What Is Called Thinking? =

1955 book by Martin Heidegger

- Cover of the first edition
- Author: Martin Heidegger
- Original title: Was heißt Denken?
- Translator: 1968: Fred D. Wick and J. Glenn Gray
- Language: German
- Subject: Thought, ontology
- Publisher: 1954: Max Nlemeyer Verlag
- Publication date: 1954
- Publication place: Germany
- English publication date: 1968: Harper & Row
- ISBN: 3-15-008805-4
- Preceded by: The Origin of the Work of Art

What Is Called Thinking? (German: Was heißt Denken?) is a book by the philosopher Martin Heidegger, the published version of a lecture course he gave during the winter and summer semesters of 1951 and 1952 at the University of Freiburg.

== Reception ==
The philosopher Hannah Arendt wrote that "For an acquaintance with the thought of Heidegger, What Is Called Thinking? is as important as Being and Time. It is the only systematic presentation of the thinker's late philosophy and . . . it is perhaps the most exciting of his books."
