= The Origin of the Work of Art =

Book by the German philosopher Martin Heidegger

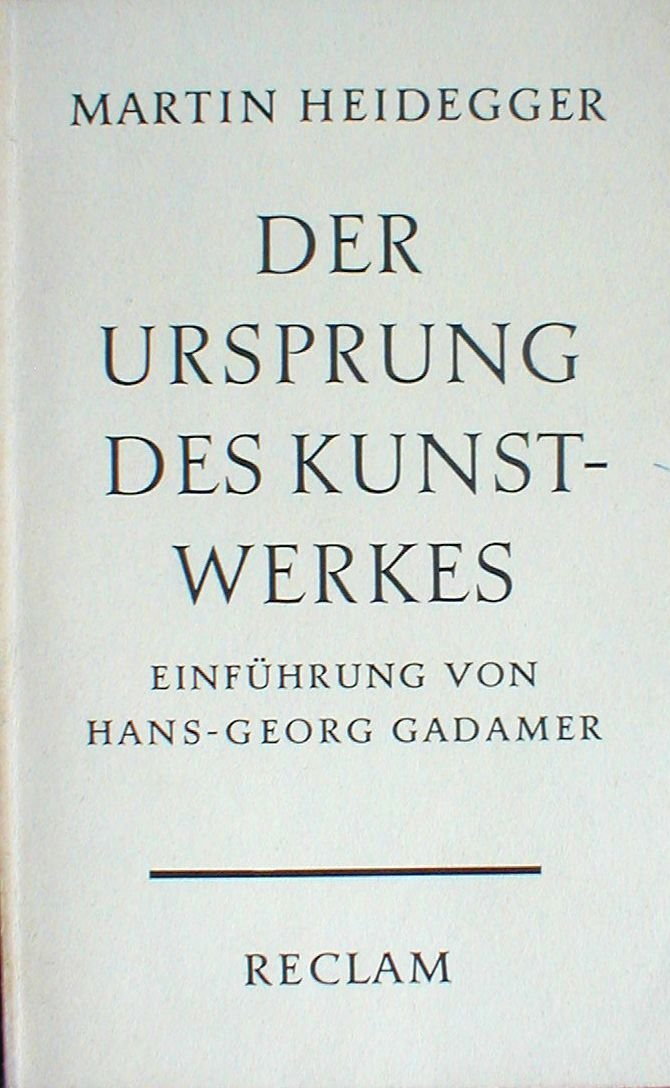
- Cover of the 1960 German edition
- Author: Martin Heidegger
- Original title: Der Ursprung des Kunstwerkes
- Language: German
- Published: 1950
- Publication place: Germany
- Preceded by: The Question Concerning Technology
- Followed by: What Is Called Thinking?

"The Origin of the Work of Art" (German: Der Ursprung des Kunstwerkes) is an essay by the German philosopher Martin Heidegger. Heidegger drafted the text between 1935 and 1937, reworking it for publication in Off the Beaten Track in 1950 and again in 1960. Heidegger based his essay on a series of lectures he had previously delivered in Zurich and Frankfurt during the 1930s, first on the essence of the work of art and then on the question of the meaning of a "thing", marking the philosopher's first lectures on the notion of art.

== Content ==
In "The Origin of the Work of Art" Heidegger explains the essence of art in terms of the concepts of being and truth. He argues that art is not only a way of expressing the element of truth in a culture, but the means of creating it and providing a springboard from which "that which is" can be revealed. Works of art are not merely representations of the way things are, but actually produce a community's shared understanding. Each time a new artwork is added to any culture, the meaning of what it is to exist is inherently changed.

Heidegger begins his essay with the question of what the source of a work of art is. The artwork and the artist, he explains, exist in a dynamic where each appears to be a provider of the other. "Neither is without the other. Nevertheless, neither is the sole support of the other." Art, a concept separate from both work and creator, thus exists as the source for them both. Rather than control lying with the artist, art becomes a force that uses the creator for art's own purposes. Likewise, the resulting work must be considered in the context of the world in which it exists, not that of its artist. In discovering the essence, however, the problem of the hermeneutic circle arises. In sum, the hermeneutic circle raises the paradox that, in any work, without understanding the whole, you can’t fully comprehend the individual parts, but without understanding the parts, you cannot comprehend the whole. Applied to art and artwork, we find that without knowledge of the essence of art, we cannot grasp the essence of the artwork, but without knowledge of the artwork, we cannot find the essence of art. Heidegger concludes that to take hold of this circle you either have to define the essence of art or of the artwork, and, as the artwork is simpler, we should start there.

A Pair of Shoes (1885), by Vincent van Gogh

Artworks, Heidegger contends, are things, a definition that raises the question of the meaning of a "thing", such that works have a thingly character. This is a broad concept, so Heidegger chooses to focus on three dominant interpretations of things:

1. Things as substances with properties, or as bearers of traits.
2. Things as the manifold of sense perceptions.
3. Things as formed matter.

The third interpretation is the most dominant (extended to all beings), but is derived from equipment: "This long familiar mode of thought preconceives all immediate experience of beings. The preconception shackles reflection on the Being of any given being." The reason Heidegger selects a pair of peasant shoes painted by Vincent van Gogh is to establish a distinction between artwork and other "things", such as pieces of equipment, as well as to open up experience through phenomenological description. This was actually typical of Heidegger as he often chose to study shoes and shoe maker shops as an example for the analysis of a culture. Heidegger explains the viewer's responsibility to consider the variety of questions about the shoes, asking not only about form and matter—what are the shoes made of?—but bestowing the piece with life by asking of purpose—what are the shoes for? What world do they open up and belong to? In this way we can get beyond correspondence theories of truth which posit truth as the correspondence of representations (form) to reality (matter).

Next, Heidegger writes of art's ability to set up an active struggle between "Earth" and "World". "World" represents meaning which is disclosed, not merely the sum of all that is ready-to-hand for one being but rather the web of significant relations in which Dasein, or human being(s), exist (a table, for example, as part of the web of signification, points to those who customarily sit at it, the conversations once had around it, the carpenter who made it, and so on - all of which point to further and further things). So a family unit could be a world, or a career path could be a world, or even a large community or nation. "Earth" means something like the background against which every meaningful "worlding" emerges. It is outside (unintelligible to) the ready-to-hand. Both are necessary components for an artwork to function, each serving unique purposes. The artwork is inherently an object of "world", as it creates a world of its own; it opens up for us other worlds and cultures, such as worlds from the past like the ancient Greek or medieval worlds, or different social worlds, like the world of the peasant, or of the aristocrat. However, the very nature of art itself appeals to "Earth", as a function of art is to highlight the natural materials used to create it, such as the colors of the paint, the density of the language, or the texture of the stone, as well as the fact that everywhere an implicit background is necessary for every significant explicit representation. In this way, "World" is revealing the unintelligibility of "Earth", and so admits its dependence on the natural "Earth". This reminds us that concealment (hiddenness) is the necessary precondition for unconcealment (aletheia), i.e. truth. The existence of truth is a product of this struggle—the process of art—taking place within the artwork.

Heidegger uses the example of a Greek temple to illustrate his conception of world and earth. Such works as the temple help in capturing this essence of art as they go through a transition from artworks to art objects depending on the status of their world. Once the culture has changed, the temple no longer is able to actively engage with its surroundings and becomes passive—an art object. He holds that a working artwork is crucial to a community and so must be able to be understood. Yet, as soon as meaning is pinned down and the work no longer offers resistance to rationalization, the engagement is over and it is no longer active. While the notion appears contradictory, Heidegger is the first to admit that he was confronting a riddle—one that he did not intend to answer as much as to describe in regard to the meaning of art.

== Influence and criticism ==
Meyer Schapiro argued that the Van Gogh boots discussed are not really peasant boots but those of Van Gogh himself, a detail that would undermine Heidegger's reading. During the 1930s mentions of soil carried connotations which are lost for later readers (see Blood and Soil). Problems with both Heidegger and Schapiro's texts are further discussed in Jacques Derrida's Restitutions - On Truth to Size and in the writing of Babette Babich. A recent refutation of Schapiro's critique has been given by Iain Thomson (2011). Heidegger's notions about art have made a relevant contribution to discussions on artistic truth. Heidegger's reflections in this regard also affected architectural thinking, especially in terms of reflections on the question of dwelling. Refer to the influential work in architectural phenomenology of: Christian Norberg-Schulz, Genius Loci, Towards a Phenomenology of Architecture (New York: Rizzoli, 1980); and see also a recent treatment of the question of dwelling in: Nader El-Bizri, 'On Dwelling: Heideggerian Allusions to Architectural Phenomenology', Studia UBB. Philosophia, Vol. 60, No. 1 (2015): 5-30.

Historian and political scientist Richard Wolin engaged with Heidegger's "ever-mounting respect and critical engagement" with "absolute idealism," particularly in the context of the Heideggerian revival of a pre-Socratic unity of opposites, artist "state founding," poet-legislators, the Herrenvolk as metaphysical peoples, and concealment vis-à-vis "truth in its nature is untruth" in Heidegger in Ruins: Between Philosophy and Ideology (2023).

== Editions ==
- Heidegger, Martin. Off the Beaten Track (Cambridge: Cambridge University Press, 2002). Translation of Holzwege (Frankfurt: Vittorio Klostermann, 1950), volume 5 in Heidegger's Gesamtausgabe.
- Heidegger, Martin; trans. David Farrell Krell (2008). "The Origin of the Work of Art". Martin Heidegger: The Basic Writings. New York: HarperCollins. pp. 143–212.

== See also ==
- Being and Time
- Contributions to Philosophy
- Deconstruction
- Hermeneutics
- Postmodernism
