= Immanent critique =

Concept in culture analysis

Immanent critique is a method of analyzing culture that identifies contradictions in society's rules and systems. Most importantly, it juxtaposes the ideals articulated by society against the inadequate realization of those ideals in society's institutions.

As a method for the critique of ideology, immanent critique analyzes cultural forms in philosophy, the social sciences and humanities. Immanent critique pays close attention to the logic and meanings of the ideas expressed in the cultural text. It further aims to contextualize not only the specific cultural object of its investigation, but also the broader ideological basis of that text: It aims to show that the ideology is a product of a historical process and does not reflect timeless truths.

Immanent critique has its roots in the dialectic of Georg Wilhelm Friedrich Hegel and the criticisms of both Pierre-Joseph Proudhon and Karl Marx. Today it is strongly associated with the critical theorists such as Theodor Adorno as well as literary theorists such as Fredric Jameson who, in his foundational work The Political Unconscious, explored the idea of an immanent analysis of texts to argue the primacy of political interpretation. Roy Bhaskar has advocated it as one of the key methodological elements of critical realism.

Adorno contrasted immanent critique with "transcendent" critique, which typically reduces a set of ideas to their political uses or to the class interests they express. Transcendent critique, unlike immanent critique, adopts an external perspective and focuses on the historical genesis of ideas, while negating the values expressed in the cultural text. The purpose of immanent critique, instead, is the detection of societal contradictions that suggest possibilities for emancipatory social change. It considers the role of ideas in shaping society. An immanent critique of a cultural text discusses the ideal principles (overt or implicit) proposed by the text. It highlights the gaps between what something stands for and what is actually being done in society. Immanent critique tries to find contradictions in the internal logic of the cultural text and indirectly provide alternatives, without constructing an entirely new theory. It has the power to appeal to people's shared ideals while highlighting how far society has to go before those ideals are realized.

Quoting Marx, Robert J. Antonio writes:

"'Setting out from idealism ... I hit upon seeking the Idea in the real itself. If formerly the gods had dwelt above the world, they had now become its center.' Marx concluded that immanent principles were necessary weapons in the struggle for progressive social change, because they provide a basis for critique within historical reality. Later, this immanent grounding became the axis of his emancipatory critique of capitalism."

According to David L. Harvey:

"Critical theory at its most abstract and general level ... begins as a formal 'negativity.' As a dissenting motif, it selects some tradition, ideological premise, or institutionalized orthodoxy for analysis. As immanent critique, it then 'enters its object,' so to speak, 'boring from within.' Provisionally accepting the methodological presuppositions, substantive premises, and truth-claims of orthodoxy as its own, immanent critique tests the postulates of orthodoxy by the latter's own standards of proof and accuracy. Upon 'entering' the theory, orthodoxy's premises and assertions are registered and certain strategic contradictions located. These contradictions are then developed according to their own logic, and at some point in this process of internal expansion, the one-sided proclamations of orthodoxy collapse as material instances and their contradictions are allowed to develop 'naturally.'"

== See also ==
- Frankfurt School
- Reflective disclosure
- Quietism
- "World disclosing" arguments
