= World disclosure =

Revelation of intelligibility

World disclosure (German: Erschlossenheit, literally "development, comprehension") is a philosophical term of art that refers to the way(s) in which things become intelligible and meaningfully relevant to human beings, by virtue of being part of a shared ontological world – i.e., a pre-interpreted and holistically structured background of meaning. This understanding is said to be first disclosed to human beings through their practical day-to-day encounters with others, their concerned involvement with things in the world, and through language.

The phenomenon was described by the German philosopher Martin Heidegger in the book Being and Time. It has been discussed (not always using the same name) by philosophers such as John Dewey, Jürgen Habermas, Nikolas Kompridis and Charles Taylor.

Some philosophers, such as Ian Hacking and Nikolas Kompridis, have also described how this ontological understanding can be re-disclosed in various ways (including through innovative forms of philosophical argument).

== First and second order disclosure ==
The idea of disclosure supposes that the meaning of a word or thing depends upon the context in which we encounter it, including the way of life of which it is a part. For example, a table is part of a context with other things that give it its sense or purpose – e.g. chairs, food, a teapot, pencils, books – and we first learn about it through our everyday experience of it in particular contexts. Its meaning is "given" to us by virtue of its connection to various activities (e.g. writing, eating, conversation), and by qualities (e.g. conviviality) that give it value in relation to such activities. These constitute part of its "conditions of intelligibility."

The implication is that we are always already "thrown" into these conditions, that is, thrown into a prior understanding of the things which we encounter on a daily basis – an understanding that is already somewhat meaningful and coherent. However, our understanding cannot be made fully conscious or knowable at one time, since this background understanding isn't itself an object:

[T]he world is not a possible object of knowledge – because it is not an object at all, not an entity or set of entities. It is that within which entities appear, a field or horizon [that set] the conditions for any intra-worldly relation, and so is not analysable in terms of any such relation.

— Stephen Mulhall, Heidegger and Being and Time, p. 96

According to Nikolas Kompridis, the initial disclosure of an ontological world is said to be "pre-reflective" or first-order disclosure. However, this so-called first-order disclosure is not fixed, as it can vary across historical time and cultural space. Furthermore, Kompridis has described a kind of second-order or reflective disclosure. Whereas first-order disclosure involves an implicit, unconscious and largely passive relation to meaning, reflective disclosure is an explicit re-working of meaning and the terms used to make sense of ourselves and the world, through the "refocusing" or "de-centering" of our understanding. Reflective disclosure is thus a way of acting back upon conditions of intelligibility, in order to clarify or reshape our background understanding. Because of this, reflective disclosure also affects conditions of possibility by impacting on such basic questions as "what counts as a thing, what counts as true/false, and what it makes sense to do."

While some philosophers, notably Jürgen Habermas and Richard Rorty, claim that disclosure is an aesthetic phenomenon (supposedly, neither rational nor cognitive and therefore not philosophical), disclosive arguments have been employed in many contexts that are not primarily considered literary or "aesthetic," and some philosophers have argued for the importance of disclosure's (not to mention, aesthetics') place in human reason, most notably Nikolas Kompridis and Charles Taylor.

== World-disclosing arguments ==
All testing, all confirmation and disconfirmation of a hypothesis takes place already within a system. And this system is not a more or less arbitrary and doubtful point of departure for all our arguments: no, it belongs to the essence of what we call an argument... as the element in which arguments have their life.

— Ludwig Wittgenstein

World-disclosing arguments are a family of philosophical argument described by Nikolas Kompridis in his book Critique and Disclosure. According to Kompridis, these arguments have distinctive forms, sometimes called styles of reasoning, that start with a disclosive approach instead of, or in addition to methods that are deductive, inductive, etc. According to Kompridis and Taylor, these forms of argument attempt to reveal features of a wider ontological or cultural-linguistic understanding (or "world," in a specifically ontological sense), in order to clarify or transform the background of meaning and "logical space" on which an argument implicitly depends. A major example of this type of argument is said to be that of immanent critique, although it is not the only kind.

In deductive arguments, the "test" of the argument's success are said to be its formal validity and soundness. However, in a world-disclosing argument, the primary criterion for success is the solution of a problem that could not be successfully dealt with under some previous understanding or paradigm, for example, after an epistemological crisis (see Paradigm shift). It is therefore said to be possibility disclosing rather than "truth-preserving" or "truth-tracking." The "claim" made by such an argument is that of a new insight, resulting from the adoption of a new stance or perspective that reveals, or discloses a new possibility for thinking and acting.

Nikolas Kompridis has described two kinds of fallibilism in this regard. The first consists in being open to new evidence that could disprove some previously held position or belief (the taken-for-granted position of the observer in normal science). The second refers to the consciousness of "the degree to which our interpretations, valuations, our practices, and traditions are temporally indexed" and subject to historical change. This "time-responsive" (as opposed to "evidence-responsive") fallibilism consists in an expectant openness to some future possibility. According to Kompridis, world-disclosing arguments are fallible in both senses of the word.

Major examples of world disclosing arguments in philosophy are said to include:

- Transcendental arguments, in which an understanding of some feature of experience is shown to logically entail certain necessary conceptual pre-suppositions (e.g. I. Kant's transcendental self, Heidegger's elucidation of ontological being in Being and Time, L. Wittgenstein's private language argument in Philosophical Investigations);
- Dialectical arguments, where the premises argued from are shown to be logically weaker than the argument's conclusion (e.g. G. W. F. Hegel's master–slave dialectic and T. W. Adorno's dialectic of Enlightenment);
- Historical ontologies, such as those articulated by Michel Foucault (the historical ontology of power), Jacques Derrida (the historical ontology of meaning) and philosopher of science Ian Hacking (scientific revolutions); and
- Forms of argument that, "through the use of hermeneutic arguments and creative redescriptions" of our practices and cultural paradigms, re-disclose the background of cultural meaning and "logical space of possibility".

Other modern philosophers who are said to employ world-disclosing arguments include Hans-Georg Gadamer, George Herbert Mead and Maurice Merleau-Ponty.

== See also ==
- Aletheia
- Disclosing New Worlds
- Embodied cognitive science
- Forms of life
- Habitus
- Heideggerian terminology
- Hidden curriculum
- Hubert Dreyfus
- Implicit cognition
- Implicit memory
- Receptivity
- Tacit knowledge
- Utopia for Realists
