= Reflective disclosure =

Model of social criticism

Reflective disclosure is a model of social criticism proposed and developed by philosopher Nikolas Kompridis. It is partly based on Martin Heidegger's insights into the phenomenon of world disclosure, which Kompridis applies to the field of political and social philosophy. The term refers to practices through which we can imagine and articulate meaningful alternatives to current social and political conditions, by acting back on their conditions of intelligibility. This could uncover possibilities that were previously suppressed or untried, or make us insightfully aware of a problem in a way that allows us to go on differently with our institutions, traditions and ideals.

== Overview ==
In his book Critique and Disclosure: Critical Theory between Past and Future, Kompridis describes a set of heterogeneous social practices he believes can be a source of significant ethical, political, and cultural transformation. Highlighting the work of theorists such as Hannah Arendt, Charles Taylor, Michel Foucault and others, Kompridis calls such practices examples of "reflective disclosure" after Martin Heidegger's insights into the phenomenon of world disclosure. He also argues that social criticism or critique, and in particular critical theory, ought to incorporate Heidegger's insights about this phenomenon and reorient itself around practices of reflective disclosure if it is, as he puts it, "to have a future worthy of its past".

These practices, according to Kompridis, constitute what Charles Taylor calls a "new department" of reason which is distinct from instrumental reason, from reason understood merely as the slave of the passions (Hume), and from the idea of reason as public justification (Rawls). In contrast to theories of social and political change that emphasize socio-historical contradictions (i.e., Marxist and neo-Marxist), theories of recognition and self-realization, and theories that try to make sense of change in terms of processes that are outside the scope of human agency, Kompridis' paradigm for critical theory, with reflective disclosure at the centre, is to help reopen the future by disclosing alternative possibilities for speech and action, self-critically expanding what he calls the normative and logical "space of possibility".

Kompridis contrasts his own vision of critical theory with a Habermasian emphasis on the procedures by which we can reach agreement in modern democratic societies. He claims the latter has ignored the utopian concerns that previously animated critical theory, and narrowed its scope in a way that brings it closer to liberal and neo-Kantian theories of justice.

== See also ==
- Critical theory
- Frankfurt School
- Immanent critique
- Nikolas Kompridis
- Receptivity
- World disclosure
- "World disclosing" arguments
- Quietism
