= Nikolas Kompridis =

Canadian philosopher (born 1953)

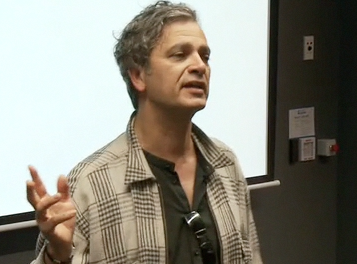
- Kompridis in Auckland, 2008
- Born: 1953 (age 72–73)

Education
- Education: York University
- Academic advisor: Jürgen Habermas

Philosophical work
- Era: Contemporary philosophy
- Region: Western philosophy
- School: Continental philosophy Critical theory
- Institutions: Australian Catholic University
- Main interests: Aesthetics; Democratic theory Political theory
- Notable ideas: Reflective disclosure, receptivity

Nikolas Kompridis (/kəmˈpriːdiːz/; born 1953) is a Canadian philosopher and political theorist. His major published work addresses the direction and orientation of Frankfurt School critical theory; the legacy of philosophical romanticism; and the aesthetic dimension(s) of politics. His writing touches on a variety of issues in social and political thought, aesthetics, and the philosophy of culture, often in terms of re-worked concepts of receptivity and world disclosure—a paradigm he calls "reflective disclosure".

== Critical theory ==
After gaining his Ph.D. at Toronto's York University, Kompridis worked with the influential philosopher and Frankfurt School social theorist Jürgen Habermas while a post-doctoral fellow at Goethe University. Following his time with Habermas he wrote a book responding to what he saw as serious shortcomings and inconsistencies in his mentor's work. In Critique and Disclosure: Critical Theory between Past and Future (2006), Kompridis argues that Habermasian critical theory, which has in recent decades become the main paradigm of that tradition, has largely severed its own roots in German idealism, while neglecting modernity's distinctive relationship to time and the utopian potential of critique.

While drawing on many of Habermas' own insights (along with the philosophical traditions of German idealism, American pragmatism, and the work of many others), Kompridis proposes an alternative approach to social criticism and what he sees as its role in facilitating social change. This interpretation is guided by an engagement with Martin Heidegger's concept of world disclosure, as well as alternative conceptions of key philosophical categories, like critique, agency, reason, and normativity. Arguing against Habermas' procedural conception of reason and in favour of a new paradigm Kompridis calls reflective disclosure, the book suggests that critical theory should become a "possibility-disclosing" practice of social criticism "if it is to have a future worthy of its past."

=== Critical reception and engagement ===
In a largely favourable review of the book, Fred R. Dallmayr writes:

This is an important and timely (or time-sensitive) book, both in philosophical and in practical-political terms. Today its plea for a recovery of trust in the future has gained unexpectedly broad resonance… the book in a way signals the end of a period marked by divergent, even opposite tendencies: on the one hand, the "postmodern" fascination with "extraordinary" rupture (or rapture), and on the other, the streamlining of critical theory in the mold of a rule-governed, rationalist normalcy.

James Swindal suggests that Kompridis has not taken more recent work of Habermas' fully into account, but that nonetheless, "this is a book that needed to be written" because "Habermas’s critique of disclosure was at times narrow and short-sighted. But as Habermas is now rethinking some of these shortcomings, Kompridis gives him – and indeed all critical theorists – ample resources" for a better balance between disclosure and procedural thinking. Similarly, Dana Villa writes that "Kompridis argues—persuasively, I think— that contemporary critical theory would do well to abandon its insistence that communicative rationality is the quasi-transcendental core of democratic legitimacy" and rethink its suspicion of world disclosure.

In November 2011, the journal Philosophy and Social Criticism published a number of responses to the book from other critical theorists, along with a reply from Kompridis.

Kompridis has also published a number of essays arguing for his own conceptions of cultural change, receptivity, critique, recognition and reason, and has engaged in written debates about these and other issues with critical theorists including Amy Allen, Axel Honneth, Nancy Fraser and Seyla Benhabib.

== Romanticism ==
Kompridis has written that he sees critical theory, and critique in general, as implicitly romantic in its self-understanding, and much of his scholarly work reflects this concern. His edited collection, Philosophical Romanticism (2006), includes essays on diverse themes in romanticism from philosophers such as Albert Borgmann, Stanley Cavell, Hubert Dreyfus, Richard Eldridge, Robert Pippin and others, as well as his own contributions. The topics addressed in the volume include: "Beginning anew"; "Self-determination and expression"; "Art and irony"; "The living force of things"; and "Returning the everyday".

In 2009, Kompridis published a chapter on Romanticism in The Oxford Handbook of Philosophy and Literature, articulating his view of the relationship between romanticism and social change, and particularly the work of the social critic. There, he connects the work of a number of poets, artists and philosophers – including Rainer Maria Rilke, Walter Benjamin, Jean-Luc Godard, William Wordsworth and Ralph Waldo Emerson – whom Kompridis sees sharing a deep concern with the possibility of individual and cooperative transformation. He writes that:

What is demanded of [the romantic critic], in spite of all the obstacles and constraints, in spite of the improbability and possible futility of it all, is to find and found new ways of looking at things, new ways of speaking and acting, new kinds of practices, and new kinds of institutions. Anyone who thinks such change is not only necessary but also (improbably) possible, whatever their view of 'romanticism,' is a hopeless romantic.

== Politics, aesthetics and receptivity ==
The Aesthetic Turn in Political Thought (2014) is a collection of essays, edited by Kompridis, which explores the connections between aesthetics and democratic politics. The book takes as its starting point a statement by Jacques Rancière (who is also a contributor), that "politics is aesthetic in principle."

A musician by training, Kompridis has frequently married an interest in aesthetics with other philosophical concerns. Among others, he has authored papers on topics including the philosophy of music under conditions of cultural pluralism ("Amidst the Plurality of Voices: Philosophy of Music after Adorno"), on the relation between receptivity, recognition, and literature ("Recognition and Receptivity: Forms of Normative Response in the Lives of the Animals We Are"—which engages with prior debates about J. M. Coetzee's novel, The Lives of Animals, as well as debates in critical theory on recognition); and on "The priority of receptivity to creativity," a paper that explores Russell Hoban's novel, The Medusa Frequency.

Kompridis has lectured on film, on the relationship between cultural memory, diversity, and the arts, and has discussed music and philosophy with his former teacher, the composer Martin Bresnick, in a discussion broadcast on ABC's Big Ideas program.

In 2011, Kompridis guest-edited and contributed to a special issue of the journal Ethics and Global Politics on "A Politics of Receptivity".

== Technology and human being ==
In 2008, Kompridis spoke at a conference on "The Post/Human Condition" held in Auckland (a related essay was published in the online journal Parrhesia). In the talk, Kompridis outlined the potential dangers he saw from the new, convergent "techno-sciences" of genetic engineering, synthetic biology, robotics and nanotechnology, while criticizing what he considered to be the transhumanist aspirations of several major research programs in those fields. According to Kompridis, the post-human is now "a real, not a notional… possibility," and therefore the question of what it means to be human "is all of a sudden a pressing question, a question absolutely pressed for time—since, evidently, the space in which it can still be meaningfully posed, and thus the space in which a meaningful response could be fashioned, is shrinking at an alarming rate."

While acknowledging that in a culturally plural world, there can be no single or essentialist conception of what it means to be human, Kompridis nonetheless argues that "we have an obligation to deepen our understanding of what it is that is actually threatened" by the new technologies. Otherwise, the question of what it means to be human will be "permanently foreclosed" for human beings, because it will have been already "decided by scientific experts and market forces, and a certain tendency of our liberal culture to favour anything that increases the freedom of choice of individuals."

Kompridis therefore proposes an inter-disciplinary "counter science of the human" to provide alternatives to naturalistic assumptions about identity, which predominate in the natural sciences, and which work in concert with the wider culture of individualism to erode, and preclude, other understandings of what it means to be human. This counter science would take as its two main starting points:

1. The concept of the person, underpinned not by consciousness, but by a definition based on the things that human beings care about in peculiarly human ways; and
2. The phenomenon of intercorporeality, the way in which human beings develop the ability to learn, act and make sense of things under conditions of embodiment in a social context.

This approach is intended to complement and build upon the work of other philosophers, including Harry Frankfurt, Charles Taylor and Maurice Merlau-Ponty.

== Books ==
- Critique and Disclosure: Critical Theory between Past and Future. 2006. Cambridge: MIT Press, 337 pp. (ISBN 026211299X, ISBN 978-0-262-11299-4)
- Philosophical Romanticism (ed.) 2006. London: Routledge, 304 pp. (ISBN 0415256445, ISBN 978-0-415-25644-5)
- The Aesthetic Turn in Political Thought (ed.) 2014. New York, London: Bloomsbury, 320 pp. (ISBN 144118516X, ISBN 978-1-441-18516-7)
