= Receptivity =

Practical capacity and source of normativity

Receptivity, or receptive agency, is a practical capacity and source of normativity, which, according to the philosopher Nikolas Kompridis, has both ontological and ethical dimensions, and refers to a mode of listening and "normative response" to demands arising outside the self, as well as "a way by which we might become more attuned to our pre-reflective understanding of the world, to our inherited ontologies," thereby generating non-instrumental possibilities for social change and self-transformation. Kompridis has argued for the importance of receptivity to democratic politics, romanticism and critical theory.
