= Julian Young =

American philosopher known for post-Kantian philosophy

Julian Padraic Young
- Born: 19 June 1943 (age 83)
- Awards: The Association of American Publishers 2010 PROSE Award for Philosophy

Education
- Education: University of Pittsburgh

Philosophical work
- Era: 20th century German philosophy 19th century German philosophy
- Region: Western philosophy
- School: Continental philosophy
- Institutions: University of Auckland; Wake Forest University
- Main interests: meaning of life, philosophy of art, post-Kantian philosophy

Julian Padraic Young (born June 19, 1943) is an American philosopher and William R. Kenan Jr. Professor of Humanities at Wake Forest University. He is known for his expertise on post-Kantian philosophy.

== Career ==
He specializes in Continental (nineteenth- and twentieth-century German and French) philosophy, philosophy of art, environmental philosophy, and philosophy of religion. Prior to moving to the United States, Professor Young taught at all levels at the universities of Auckland, Pittsburgh, Calgary and Tasmania, the following: Introduction to Ethics, Introduction to Metaphysics and Theory of Knowledge, Introduction to Theories of Human Nature, British Empiricism, Quine and Sellars, Wittgenstein, Plato, Kant, Hegel, Nietzsche, Schopenhauer, Heidegger, Sartre and Camus. He has supervised and examined numerous MA and PhD theses at Auckland and throughout Australasia. He is the author of ten books, mostly on nineteenth- and twentieth-century German philosophy. He has appeared on radio and television in Ireland, New Zealand and the US, and has written for the Guardian, the New York Times and Harper's Magazine.

== Accusations of Plagiarism ==
In 2011, Mark Anderson, a professor at Belmont University, discovered that a significant amount of textual formulations and ideas in Young's Friedrich Nietzsche: A Philosophical Biography (Cambridge University Press, 2010) were plagiarized from an earlier biography by Curtis Cate. In addition to "large-scale structural similarities", Anderson provides more than ten examples of Young's unethical academic practice. A group of scholars led by Mohan Matthen (Professor of Philosophy and senior Canada Research Chair in Philosophy of Perception at the University of Toronto) suggested that Young admit publicly that the Nietzsche book "contains a number of passages that are copied from an earlier biography by Curtis Cate". Young's response was reported by Professor Matthen: "Julian Young has now inserted into unsold copies of his book a list of Errata, an acknowledgement of Cate's biography and a list of changes to his text. We applaud his honourable gesture."

== Books ==
- Nietzsche's Philosophy of Art (Cambridge: Cambridge University Press, 1994).
- Heidegger, Philosophy, Nazism (Cambridge: Cambridge University Press, 1998).
- Heidegger's Later Philosophy (Cambridge: Cambridge University Press, 2001).
- Heidegger: Off the Beaten Track (Editor and translator along with Kenneth Haynes of Martin Heidegger's Holzwege) (Cambridge: Cambridge University Press, 2002).
- The Death of God and the Meaning of Life (London: Routledge, 2003).
- Heidegger's Philosophy of Art (Cambridge: Cambridge University Press, 2004).
- Schopenhauer (London: Routledge, 2005).
- Nietzsche's Philosophy of Religion (Cambridge: Cambridge University Press, 2006).
- Friedrich Nietzsche: A Philosophical Biography (Cambridge: Cambridge University Press, 2010).
- The Philosophy of Tragedy: from Plato to Žižek (Cambridge: Cambridge University Press, 2013).
- Individual and Community in Nietzsche's Philosophy (Editor) (Cambridge: Cambridge University Press, 2014).
- The Philosophies of Richard Wagner (Lanham: Lexington Books, 2014).
- German Philosophy in the Twentieth Century: Weber to Heidegger (London: Routledge, 2018).
- German Philosophy in the Twentieth Century: Lukács to Strauss (London: Routledge, 2020).
- German Philosophy in the Twentieth Century: Dilthey to Honneth (London: Routledge, 2022).
