= Intensive stage =

Intensive stage, or by its full name, predominantly intensive stage of accumulation pertains to one of the periodizations of capitalism in economics theory, as proposed by Aglietta (1976). It is the second stage of capitalism: when the extensive stage becomes exhausted, expansion of (commodity) production is reduced to the increase in productivity of labour, or to the intensification of production.

The extensive stage reached its limits in England by the 1810s and after a lease of life through imperial expansion, definitively by the 1860s; in Germany, by the 1880s; in the US, by the 1920s; in Brazil, by the 1970s. In contemporary capitalism (or Late capitalism) it is generalized over virtually the whole world economy and some see itself having reached its limits with the exhaustion of the post-war boom by the mid-1960s.

It is disputed whether the social organization—or mode of production—based on commodity production and wage labour, that is to say, capitalism itself, can make a transition from its present form to one in which the ever-increasing branch of services can be commodified.

== See also ==
- Periodizations of capitalism
