= Advanced capitalism =

Description of potential causes and effects of long-lasting, deeply integrated capitalism

In political philosophy, particularly Frankfurt School critical theory, advanced capitalism is the situation that pertains in a society in which the capitalist model has been integrated and developed deeply and extensively and for a prolonged period. The expression advanced capitalism distinguishes such societies from the historical previous forms of capitalism, mercantilism and industrial capitalism, and partially overlaps with the concepts of a developed country; of the post-industrial age; of finance capitalism; of post-Fordism; of the spectacular society; of media culture; and of "developed", "modern", and "complex" capitalism.

== Antonio Gramsci ==
Various writers identify Antonio Gramsci as an influential early theorist of advanced capitalism, even if he did not use the term himself. In his writings Gramsci sought to explain how capitalism had adapted to avoid the revolutionary overthrow that had seemed inevitable in the 19th century. At the heart of his explanation was the decline of raw coercion as a tool of class power, replaced by use of civil society institutions to manipulate public ideology in the capitalists' favor.

== Jürgen Habermas ==
Jürgen Habermas has been a major contributor to the analysis of advanced-capitalistic societies. Habermas observed four general features that characterize advanced capitalism:

- Concentration of industrial activity in a few large firms
- Constant reliance on the state to stabilize the economic system
- A formally democratic government that legitimizes the activities of the state and dissipates opposition to the system
- The use of nominal wage increases to pacify the most restless segments of the work force

== See also ==
- Capitalist mode of production
- Late capitalism
- Post-Fordism
- State capitalism
- State monopoly capitalism
- White Collar: The American Middle Classes

== Bibliography ==
- Jürgen Habermas. Legitimation Crisis. Trans. by T. McCarthy. Boston: Beacon, 1973. from google books; excerpt
- Sombart, Werner (1916) Der moderne Kapitalismus. Historisch-systematische Darstellung des gesamteuropäischen Wirtschaftslebens von seinen Anfängen bis zur Gegenwart. Final edn. 1916, repr. 1969, paperback edn. (3 vols. in 6): 1987 Munich: dtv. (Also in Spanish; no English translation yet.)
- Ian Gough State Expenditure in Advanced Capitalism New Left Review
- Fredric Jameson (1991) Postmodernism, or, the Cultural Logic of Late Capitalism
- Ernest Mandel Late Capitalism
