= Periodizations of capitalism =

Stages of development of capitalism

A periodization of capitalism seeks to distinguish stages of development that help understanding of features of capitalism through time. The best-known periodizations that have been proposed distinguish these stages as:

1. Early / monopoly / state monopoly capitalism (Sweezy)
2. Free trade / monopoly / finance capitalism (Hilferding)
3. Early capitalism (primitive accumulation) / colonialism / imperialism (Hobson, Lenin, Bukharin)
4. Extensive stage / intensive stage / late capitalism (Aglietta)

The Marxist periodization of capitalism into the stages: agricultural capitalism, merchant capitalism, industrial capitalism and state capitalism.

Another periodization includes merchant capitalism, industrial and finance capitalism, and global capitalism.

== See also ==
- Rudolf Hilferding
- Ernest Mandel
- Paul Sweezy
