= Portuguese national debt =

The Portuguese national debt, the public debt of Portugal, or the debt of the public administrations of Portugal, as any other government debt, is the financial amount the Portuguese State owes, externally and internally, due to its various financial commitments. By December 2025, the Portuguese national debt stood at 89.2% of GDP.

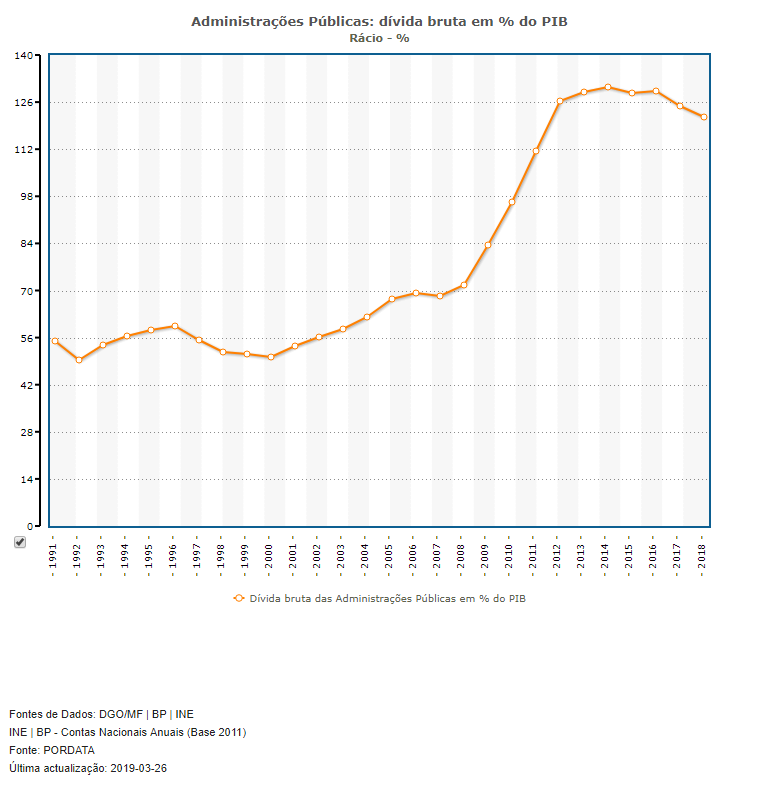
Portuguese national debt, in percentage of GDP between 1991 and 2018

Since the early 1990s, there were two main periods in which the country's debt registered strong growth. The first was at the beginning of the third millennium, i.e., from the year 2000 the Portuguese public debt began to grow in a way that many economists considered worrisome, and that in their opinion would contribute to create a structural crisis in the country. However, the big increase in the public debt, in parallel with the rest of Europe, was post-2008, after the international crisis of the Great Recession which began in 2008, that caused the sovereign debt crisis in the majority of European countries.

As the public debt presented as a % of Gross Domestic Product (GDP), it is actually presented as a ratio, as the division between the sovereign debt and the Portuguese GDP multiplied by 100 percent. Therefore, the debt increase after 2008 was also a result of GDP decrease due to economic recession.

In 2012 the Portuguese debt, at 129% of the GDP, was the second highest in relative terms in the European Union only after Greece. By the first semester of 2013, the Portuguese national debt increased to a record-high of 130% of the GDP, around 214.5 billion Euros or 293 billion US dollars. In June 2014, the public debt reached 134% of the GDP.

After 2014, when the Portuguese economy started recovering and with the end of Troika, the Portuguese debt gradually started decreasing. As of December 2023, it stood at 98.7% of the national GDP, falling to below 90% by 2025, the lowest level recorded since 2009. The Portuguese debt is still higher than the European Union average, and, as of 2025, is the 6th highest in relative terms amongst EU countries, after Greece, Italy, France, Spain and Belgium.

== Share of debt in GDP ==
Government debt in share of GDP since 1974

View source data.

== See also ==
- Eurozone crisis
