= Extensive stage =

Extensive stage, or by its full name, the predominantly extensive stage of accumulation, pertains to one of the periodizations of capitalism, as proposed by Aglietta (1976). It is the first stage of capitalism. It is also known as the early stage.

During the extensive stage, room exists for the growth of production and capitalist means of production, including wages and modes of labor. It is characterized by high rates of economic growth. When the extensive stage ends, it is followed by the intensive stage (intensive accumulation).

Karl Marx described this stage as exhibited in England as "The so-called primitive accumulation".
