= Legitimation crisis =

Decline of trust in authority

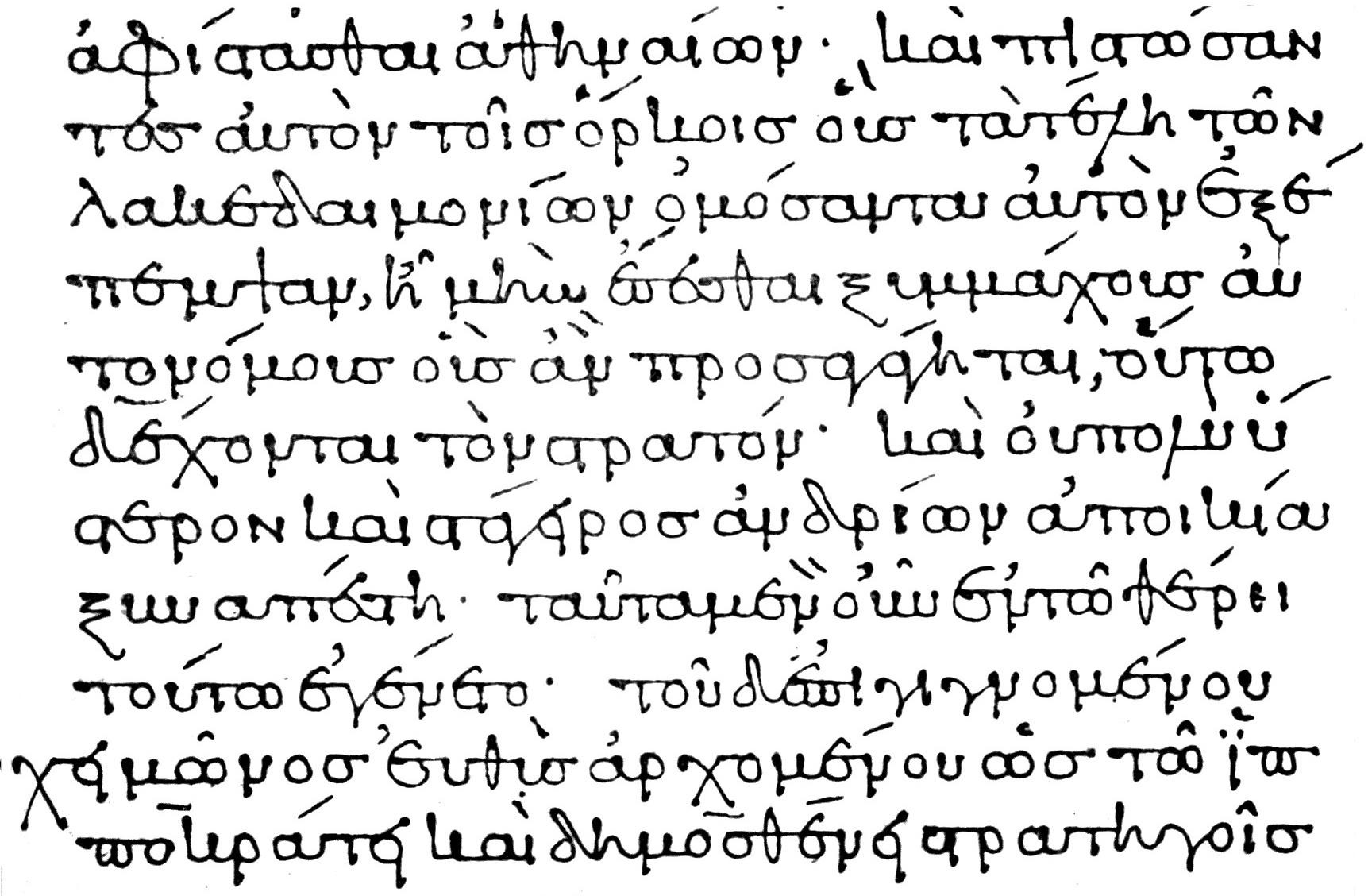
A manuscript of Thucydides' writings, who Morris Zelditch claims was one of the first people to write about a theory of legitimacy in 423 B.C.

Legitimation crisis refers to a decline in the confidence of administrative functions, institutions, or leadership. The term was first introduced in 1973 by Jürgen Habermas, a German sociologist and philosopher. Habermas expanded upon the concept, claiming that with a legitimation crisis, an institution or organization does not have the administrative capabilities to maintain or establish structures effective in achieving their end goals. The term itself has been generalized by other scholars to refer not only to the political realm, but to organizational and institutional structures as well. While there is not unanimity among social scientists when claiming that a legitimation crisis exists, a predominant way of measuring a legitimation crisis is to consider public attitudes toward the organization in question.

== Legitimacy ==
With respect to political theory, a state is perceived as being legitimate when its citizens treat it as properly holding and exercising political power. While the term exists beyond the political realm, as it encompasses sociology, philosophy, and psychology, legitimacy is often referred to with respect to actors, institutions, and the political orders they constitute. In other words, actors, institutions, and social orders can be seen as being either legitimate or illegitimate. When political actors engage in the process of legitimation they are pursuing legitimacy for themselves or for another institution. According to sociologist Morris Zelditch, Jr., theories of legitimacy span 24 centuries, beginning with Thucydides' History of the Peloponnesian War.

== Theories of legitimacy ==
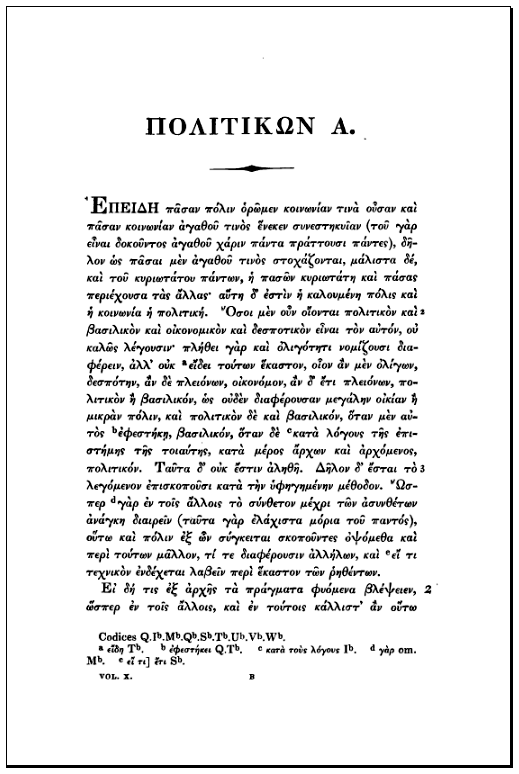
First page of Aristotle's Politics ca. 335-323 B.C.

=== Aristotle ===
Some of the earliest accounts of legitimacy come from early Greek thought. Aristotle is mainly concerned with the stability of the government. While he argues that the legitimacy of the government relies upon constitutionalism and consent, he posits that political stability relies upon the legitimacy of rewards. In his book Politics, Aristotle argues the ways in which rewards are distributed are found within politics, and distributive justice (the proper allocation of rewards according to merit) is what makes a government stable. When there is distributive injustice, on the other hand, the government becomes unstable. Also concerned with justness and distinguishing between right and wrong constitutions, Aristotle bases legitimacy on the rule of law, voluntary consent, and the public interest. While Aristotle's theory of distribution of rewards and legitimacy of constitutions both deal with legitimation, the prior emphasizes an actors acceptance that rewards are just, while the latter is concerned with an actors acceptance of a "moral obligation to obey a system of power."

=== Jean-Jacques Rousseau ===
Detailed at greater length in The Social Contract, Rousseau insists that government legitimacy is dependent upon the "general will" of its members. The general will itself is the common interests of all the citizens to provide for the common good of all citizens, as opposed to individual interests. The people who express this general will, according to Rousseau, are those who have consensually entered into a civil society. However, implicit consent is not sufficient for political legitimacy; rather, it requires the active participation of citizens in the justification of state's laws, through the general will of the people. Because legitimacy rests on the general will of the people, Rousseau believes republican or popular rule is legitimate, while tyranny and despotism are illegitimate.

In this manner says Habermas, Rousseau along with Kant reformulated the fundamental basis of legitimacy. Legitimacy no longer depended upon unifying natural principles that supposedly explained the world as a whole, such as “natural law” or religion. Opposed to this natural principle, Rousseau argued a government was legitimate when decision-making conformed to the general will. This pointed to ideal procedures enabling rational agreement among citizens and the free and open expression of opinion. For Rousseau and Kant, formal democratic procedures replaced a natural or ontological grounding of legitimacy.

=== Max Weber ===
According to Weber, a political regime is legitimate when the citizens have faith in that system. In his book, The Theory of Social and Economic Organization, Weber expands upon this idea when he writes “the basis of every system of authority, and correspondingly of every kind of willingness to obey, is a belief, a belief by virtue of which persons exercising authority are lent prestige." Weber provides three main sources of legitimate rule: traditional (it has always been that way), rational-legal (trust in legality), and charismatic (faith in the ruler). However, as Weber explains in his book Economy and Society, these ideal forms of legitimacy will necessarily always overlap. The example that Weber gives is with that of legal authority. Legality is partly traditional, for it is "established and habitual." He argues that due to the presence of legitimate authority and the way legitimate authority structures society, citizens who do not share in the belief of this legitimacy still face incentives to act as if they did.

Weber offered significant limits to the importance of legitimacy in sustaining the rule of a government. He recognized that coercion, interests, habit and atomization of the populace play a role in upholding the power of a regime. Moreover, he asserted that sometimes legitimacy (that is, the belief in the ruler's legitimate authority) shrank down to encompass only the crucial administrative staff that carries out the orders of the ruler.

=== Mark C. Suchman ===
In his book Managing Legitimacy: Strategic and Institutional Approaches, Suchman defines legitimacy as “a generalized perception or assumption that the actions of an entity are desirable, proper, appropriate within some socially constructed system of norms, values, beliefs, and definitions." He later adds to this definition, stating that because legitimacy is socially conferred, legitimacy is independent of individual participants, while dependent upon the collective constituency. In other words, an organization is legitimate when it enjoys public approval, even though the actions of an organization might deviate from particular individual interests. Suchman states three types of legitimacy: pragmatic legitimacy, moral legitimacy, and cognitive legitimacy.

==== Pragmatic legitimacy ====
Pragmatic legitimacy relies upon the self-interests of an organization's constituencies, in which the constituency scrutinizes actions and behaviors taken by the organization in order to determine their effects. This is further broken down into three sub-sections: exchange legitimacy, influence legitimacy, and dispositional legitimacy. Suchman defines exchange legitimacy as the support for organizational policies due to the policy's benefit to the constituencies. Influence legitimacy is the support for the organization not due to the benefits that constituencies believe they will receive, but rather due to their belief that the organization will be responsive to their larger interests. Dispositional legitimacy is defined as support for an organization due to the good attributes constituencies believe the organization has, such as trustworthy, decent, or wise. This is due to the fact that people typically personify organizations and characterize them as being autonomous.

==== Moral legitimacy ====
Moral legitimacy is dependent upon whether the actions of an organization or institution are judged to be moral. In other words, if the constituency believe the organization is breaking the rules of the political or economic system for immoral reasons, then this can threaten moral legitimacy. Suchman breaks moral legitimacy down into four sub-sections: consequential legitimacy, procedural legitimacy, structural legitimacy, and personal legitimacy. Consequential legitimacy relates to what an organization has accomplished based on criteria that is specific to that organization. Procedural legitimacy can be obtained by an organization by adhering to socially formalized and accepted procedures (e.g. regulatory oversight). In the case of structural legitimacy, people view an organization as legitimate because its structural characteristics allow it to do specific kinds of work. Suchman refers to this organization as being the "right organization for the job." Lastly, personal legitimacy refers to legitimacy that is derived from the charisma of individual leaders.

==== Cognitive legitimacy ====
Cognitive legitimacy is created when an organization pursues goals that society deems to be proper and desirable. Constituency support for the organization is not due to self-interest, but rather due to its taken-for-granted character. When an organization has reached this taken-for-granted status, an organization is beyond dissent. While moral and pragmatic legitimacy deal with some form of evaluation, cognitive legitimacy does not. Instead, with cognitive legitimacy society accepts these organizations as being necessary or inevitable.

== Legitimation crisis origin ==
Illustration of possible crisis tendencies from Habermas' Legitimation Crisis.
Point of Origin	System Crisis	Identity Crisis
Economic system	Economic crisis	—
Political system	Rationality crisis	Legitimation crisis
Socio-cultural system	—	Motivation crisis

German sociologist and philosopher Jürgen Habermas was the first to use the term "legitimation crisis," which he defined in his 1973 book Legitimation Crisis. A legitimation crisis is an identity crisis that results from a loss of confidence in administrative institutions, which occurs despite the fact that they still retain legal authority by which to govern. In a legitimation crisis, governing structures are unable to demonstrate that their practical functions fulfill the role for which they were instituted.

=== Crisis definition ===
A crisis is a state of jeopardy that arises because of contradicting motivations of the subsystems within a self-enclosed system. According to Habermas, the definition of crisis used in the social sciences is often based on the principles of systems theory. However, he argues that a crisis is properly understood in two dimensions, the objective and the subjective, though this connection has been difficult to grasp using conventional approaches such as systems theory or action theory.

The difference between social integration and system integration helps distinguish between the objective and subjective components of crises. Social integration refers to what Habermas calls the "life-world," a term adapted from the writings of Edmund Husserl and Alfred Schutz, which is composed of a consensual foundation of shared understandings, including norms and values, upon which a society is built. System integration, alternatively, refers to the determinants of a society, which break down when their structures "allow fewer possibilities for problem solving than are necessary to the[ir] continued existence[s]." The principles of rationalization are efficiency, calculability, predictability, and control, which are characteristic of systems as Habermas refers to them.

=== Social formations ===
Illustration of social principles of organization from Habermas' Legitimation Crisis.
Social Formation	Principle of Organization	Social and System Integration	Type of Crisis
Primitive	kinship relations: primary roles (age, sex)	no differentiation between social and system integration	externally induced identity crisis
Traditional	political class rule: state power and socio-economic classes	functional differentiation between social and system integration	internally determined identity crisis
Liberal-capitalist	unpolitical class rule: wage labor and capital	system integrative economic system also takes over socially integrative tasks	system crisis

Within a social system exist three subsystems: the economic, the political, and the socio-cultural. The subsystem that assumes functional primacy in a society is determined by the type of social formation that exists in the society. Four types of social formations can potentially characterize a social system: primitive, traditional, capitalist (liberal and advanced/organized capitalist), and post-capitalist. Each of these, with the exception of the primitive, is a class-based society. The principle of organization of a social system determines when crises occur and what type of crisis predominates in each type of social system.

- Primitive social formations have an institutional core of kinship, with the roles of age and sex making up the principle of organization of these societies. Crises within these formations arise from external factors undermining familial and tribal identities because no contradictory imperatives follow from this principle of organization.
- Traditional social formations have a principle of organization in a political form of class domination that requires legitimation since the subsystems that arise serve either system or social integration. Crises within these formations proceed from internal contradictions between "validity claims of...norms and justifications that cannot explicitly permit exploitation, and a class structure in which privileged appropriation of socially produced wealth is the rule." These social formations extend the scope of their control through heightened exploitation of labor power, either directly through physical force or indirectly through forced payments. As a result, crises within traditional social formations arise from steering problems that produce dangers to system integration and threaten the identity of the society.
- Liberal capitalism has its principle of organization in the "relationship of wage labor and capital, which is anchored in the system of bourgeois civil law." One of the facets of this social formation is the "political anonymization of class rule," which results in the socially dominant class having to convince itself that it no longer rules. Habermas argues that it is for this reason that unconstrained communication is imperative to social progress, since analysis and critique of the bourgeois society is one way to "unmask" these ideologies and cause the bourgeois to confront the contradiction between the idea and reality of its society. Crises in liberal capitalism arise through unresolved economic steering problems. As a result, markets steer the social formation not only through the use of money and power but through ideology, although they appear to be anonymous and unpolitical entities.
- Advanced capitalism has its principle of organization in the process of economic concentration. This social formation exists when the capitalist model becomes deeply integrated in a society and continues to develop extensively for a prolonged period of time. The crisis tendencies of advanced capitalism stem from the three subsystems: economic crises from the economic system; rationality and legitimation crises from the political system; and motivation crises from the socio-cultural system.

=== Legitimation crisis tendencies ===
The political subsystem of the social world requires an input of mass loyalty in order to produce an output, which consists of legitimate administrative decisions that are executed by the state. A rationality crisis is an output crisis that occurs when the state fails to meet the demands of the economy. A legitimation crisis, on the other hand, is an input crisis that occurs when "the legitimation system does not succeed in maintaining the requisite level of mass loyalty." It is an identity crisis in which administrations are unable to establish normative structures to the extent required for the entire system to function properly. As a result, the state suffers a loss of support by the public when the electorate judges its administration unaccountable. This loss of public confidence is one of many characteristics of a legitimation crisis, among them issues such as policy incoherence and loss of institutional will.

== Historical examples ==
In the past, there have been many examples of social upheaval and systemic power exchanges that can be classified as legitimation crises. According to Habermas, these crises have all occurred as a natural consequence of society's productive advancement, as the social system struggles to adapt to the strains on relations of production. In other words, as a society's "technical knowledge" advances, the equilibrium is disturbed between the technical and political aspects of production, which can result in a crisis if the imbalance isn't corrected by adequate advancement of "moral-practical knowledge." A prime example of this is in the process of industrialization, where the establishment of factories and massive workforces often precedes the establishment of government regulations, workers' rights and labor unions. As sociologist Robert Merton explains, a group is most successful and stable when it is satisfied by the achievement of its institutional goals (technical/forces of production) and also with the institutional norms and regulations condoned to achieve those goals (moral-practical/relations of production). Therefore, in order to maintain legitimacy, a society, constituted by both the government and the governed, must engage in an ongoing and competitive reevaluation of its goals and norms to ensure they continue to satisfy the society's needs. The establishment of new social movements is essential to this process.

Historically, the most stable societies have been those that enjoy widespread acceptance of both the society's institutional goals and the means used to achieve them. In contrast, every crisis of legitimacy has occurred when a large and/or important portion of a society strongly disagrees with some or all aspects of the institutional norms, as established and advanced by a particular regime or government. When a government loses support, in this regard, it risks losing its legitimacy, as the public begins to question and doubt the grounds upon which the government's claim to power is built. In dealing with these crises, individuals and groups of individuals in the society resort to various modes of adjustment or adaptation. Historically, these have usually cropped up in the form of revolutions, coups and wars.

Additionally, the logic of legitimation strongly depends on the system of domination deployed. In fact, it's the logic of legitimation that informs the concrete ways citizens and subjects comply to authority and/or contend with authority. In other words, the basis for any claim to legitimacy is often the basis for resistance against that same claim to legitimacy. For example, in some societies the economic achievements under a particular regime or government form the basis for its legitimation claims; in those societies, counterclaims to legitimacy will often highlight economic failures in order to strategically undermine the regime or government's authority. Max Weber, who first advanced this point, summarizes it below:

every...system [of domination] attempts to establish and to cultivate the belief in its legitimacy. But according to the kind of legitimacy which is claimed, the type of obedience, the kind of administrative staff developed to guarantee it, and the mode of exercising authority, will all differ fundamentally.

=== Revolutionary France ===
The events of the French Revolution, from 1789 to 1799, and the socio-political changes that it comprised can be classified as a legitimation crisis. The revolution was characteristic of a time in Europe where the divine right of monarchical rule was being undermined and transformed as the universal rights of the common citizen were emphasized instead. Consequently, the mythological world views that underpinned the governing institutions of law and that bound popular conceptions of morality were replaced with more rational ones.

=== People's Republic of China ===
The legitimation crisis in China took place after decades of power struggles and cultural shifts that had been in effect since the 1960s. The legitimation crisis, itself, was the result of several economic and political reforms made by the Chinese Communist Party (CCP) as part of an effort to salvage their reputation after the socialist policies and populist leadership of Mao Zedong in the 60s and 70s had left the Chinese economy in poor condition.

During Mao's rule, an informal social contract was established, in which the government would supply socialist benefits (e.g. egalitarianism, food and shelter, medical care, education, job security, stable prices, social stability, and elimination of social evils) in return for the public's acquiescence to one-party rule and the loss of some civil liberties and political rights. However, in the midst of the a time referred to as the Cultural Revolution from 1966 to 1976, the social contract was put in jeopardy as political and social stability faded. When Mao died in 1976, a brief crisis of legitimation followed, as the cult of personality died with him and the CCP was left without its last strong grounds for authority. Since the party's core socialist policies had also failed, in order to regain and maintain legitimacy the party was forced to shift away from its longstanding focus on Marxist ideology, economic socialism, and charismatic appeals to focusing on political and economic rationalization and legalization instead. The party's economic achievements (e.g. improved standard of living, growth and development) under its newly liberalized policies became the primary evidence of its legitimacy. In essence, the reforms were a solid move away from a control-oriented economy towards a more market-oriented, capitalist one.

The CCP faced a new legitimation crisis with the move toward capitalism, as it violated the terms of the previously established social contract (inflation rose, the income gap widened, job insecurity increased, social welfare programs deteriorated and social evils returned) and the CCP's claim to one-party rule was challenged, as the public began to wonder why they were necessary as a party if socialism had failed and capitalism was the answer; after all, the CCP's leaders were not the most qualified to exercise market-oriented economic reforms. The shift towards capitalist policies coupled with the CCP's inability to accommodate increased pressure for political liberalization and democratization eventually culminated in the Chinese democracy movement and the Tiananmen Square protests of 1989.

=== Postcolonial Africa ===
In the twentieth-century, as African states adjusted to postcolonial independence, legitimation crises and state collapse were constant threats. While authority was passed from colonial to independent rule successfully in most African states throughout the continent, some attempts at transition resulted in collapse. In Congo, for example, the state collapsed as its respective institutions (e.g. army, executives, local governments, populations) refused to recognize each other's authority and work together. It took international intervention and the installation of a strongman with foreign connivance to reconstitute the state there.

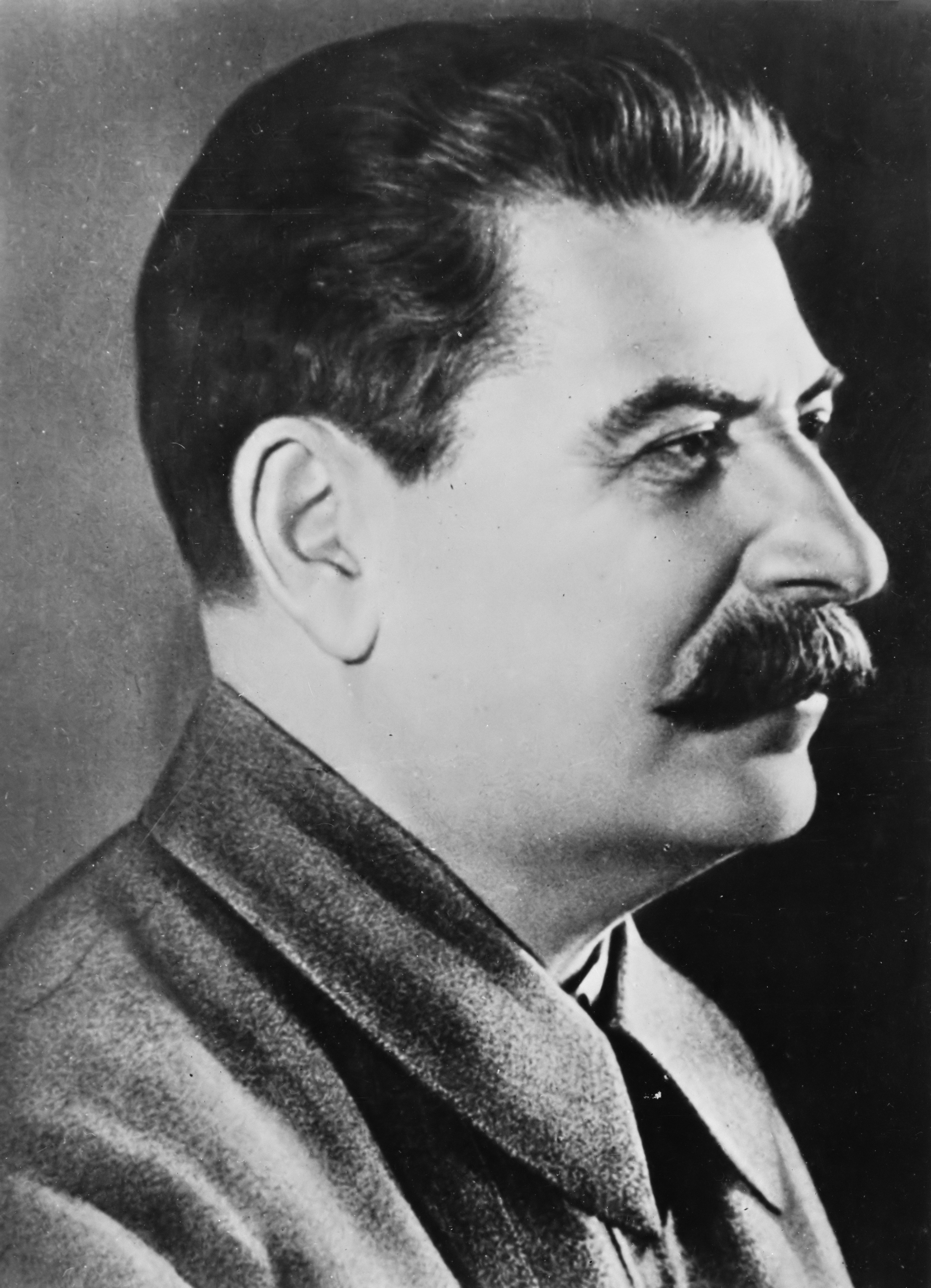
Joseph Stalin's brand of communism successfully took hold due to a combination of terror and charisma.

In other African countries, state collapse was not a strictly postcolonial issue, as most states had some success transferring between regimes. Problems arose, however, when second-generation (and later) regimes began overthrowing original nationalist ones. Chad, Uganda, and Ghana are all instances of this happening – in each, a successfully established, but dysfunctional independent regime was replaced by a military regime that managed to concentrate power, but failed to effectively wield it. Legitimation crises and state collapse soon followed.

=== Eastern Europe ===
In Eastern European countries where Stalinism was the system of domination, the legitimacy of the system was dependent on the instillment of fear among citizens and the charisma of the state leader. This was the strategy that worked for Stalin, himself, in the Soviet Union, as his brand of terror and charisma inspired a strong personality cult that placed authority and legitimacy in Stalin's hands alone. For other Eastern European states, however, Soviet communism was a foreign system that had to be imported. This proved to be a major problem, as the communist leaders in other Eastern European states lacked Stalin's charisma.

Furthermore, communism was implemented in other East European states (e.g. Romania, Hungary, Poland) in a much shorter time frame and developed very differently from the way it did in the Soviet Union. In Hungary, for example, the communist party initially came to power via tacit consent to a coalition government. Over time, the party began to strategically gain more power and get rid of competition. However, the democratic means the communist parties in these states initially used to gain power lost credibility once they were seen as violent tyrannies in service of an alien power. Ultimately, populist platforms - giving farmers land, social and economic stability, and welfare benefits - gave way to brutal collectivist realities, as leaders were blamed for the very same reforms they were once praised for.

== Contemporary examples ==
=== Tunisia ===
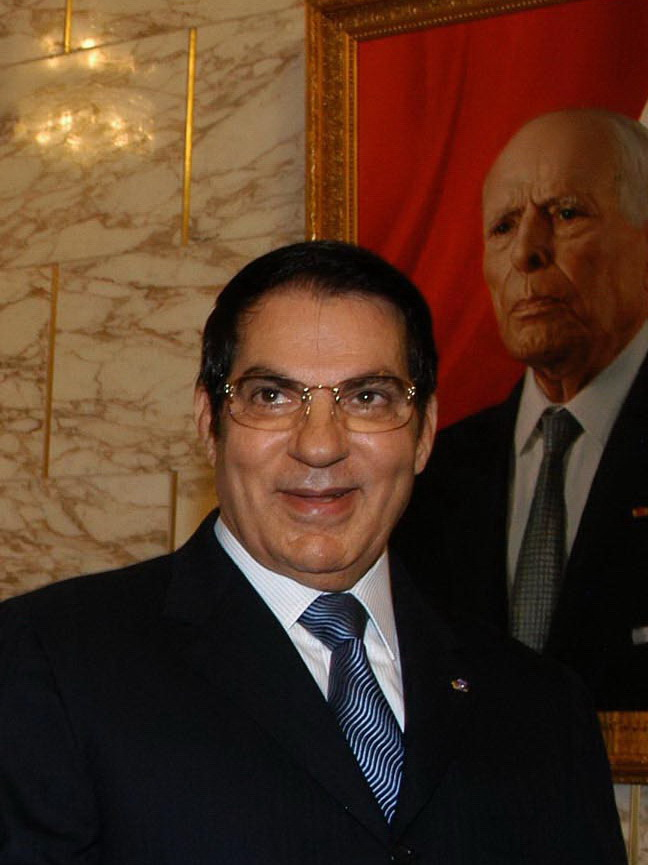
Ben Ali, former president of Tunisia, was deposed by the Tunisian people when the Arab Spring began in his state in late 2010.

The Tunisian Revolution began with the self-immolation of Mohamed Bouazizi on December 17, 2010, although it is also possible to consider the miner strike in the west central town of Gafsa in 2008 to be the official beginning of the movement. The Tunisian people toppled Ben Ali, who had imposed a police state. The revolution, like other Arab Spring revolutions which would soon follow, was prompted by endemic poverty, rising food prices, and chronic unemployment. Tunisians demanded democracy, human rights, the end of corruption, and the end of the enforcement of the 2003 Anti-Terrorism Act, which effectively criminalized their religious ideas and practices.

The previous legitimacy of the Tunisian government had been based on a combination of the charisma of former president Bourguiba's secular legacy and an achievement legitimacy based on the modernization of the Tunisian state. After this legitimacy had failed and its accompanying regime had fallen, Ennahda, an Islamist party, sought to provide legitimacy through criticism of the previous regime. Tunisia initiated a top-down modernization, led by civil, urban, and secular petty bourgeoisie, contrasting with the military coups in Egypt, Syria, and Iraq, the leadership of traditional scriptural elites in Morocco and Libya, and the leadership of revolutionary armed peasantry in Algeria.

Tunisians asked that a National Constituent Assembly (NCA) be formed that would be charged with writing the new constitution. The party of the former regime, the Constitutional Democratic Rally (RCD) was banned from running for re-election, and Ennahda received 40% of the vote in an election overseen by a higher independent authority in April 2011. With its share of 89 out of 217 total seats, Ennahda then formed a coalition in the form of a triumvirate, or troika, with the Congress for the Republic and the Forum known as Ettakatul within the NCA.

Ennahda then seized considerable control by appointing 83% of public agents at all levels, and shutting down the media by physically attacking hundreds of journalists. EnEnnahda was also suspected of several assassinations, prompting the resignation of Ennahda prime minister Hamadi Jebali in April 2013. Ennahda also failed to produce a constitution by the agreed-upon time of a year, causing many political parties, including the major political party Nidaa Tounes, to declare the end of Ennahda electoral legitimacy.

The Tunisian public and political parties then asked for a compromise legitimacy that consisted of a mandatory national dialogue between Ennahda and the other ruling members of the NCA, which began in October 2013. This effectively forced Ennahda to negotiate its own immediate departure from the government, while at the same time conceding the current failure of Islamism as a means of legitimacy. The national dialogue, which is still taking place, is seeking to establish a legitimate government, end the legislative process for the constitution and electoral code, and set up an independent body to organize elections and fix a definitive date.

=== Libya ===
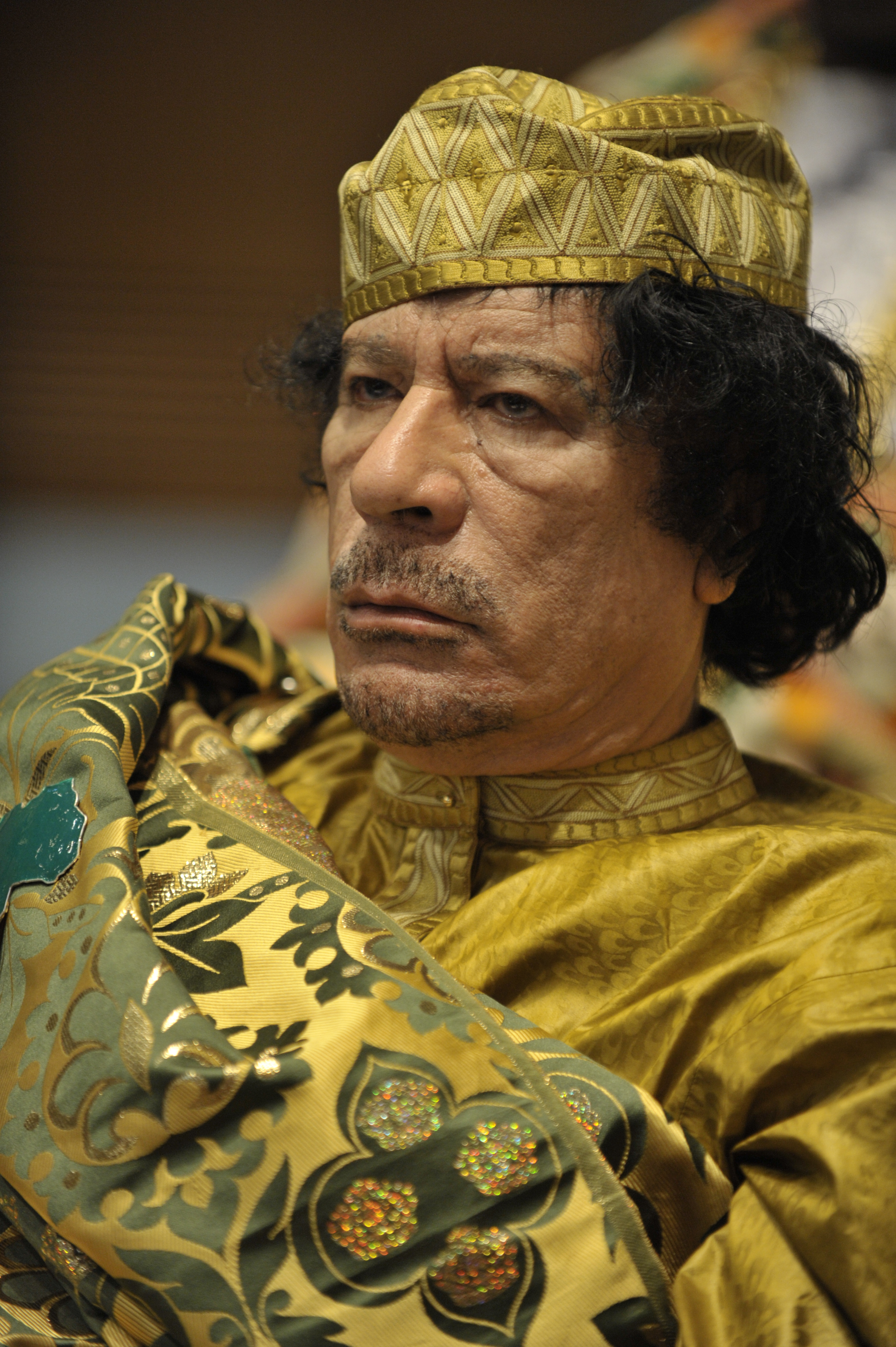
Muammar Gaddafi, former leader of Libya, held power for four decades and fought violently against protestors during the 2011 Arab Spring uprising in Libya.

Libya's revolution is also considered part of the Arab Spring, beginning February 15, 2011, just a few months after the events in Tunisia. The revolution deposed Muammar Gaddafi, who had been the ruler of Libya for four decades and had united the country under the themes of Pan-Arabism (a form of nationalism), common geography, shared history, and Islam. The revolution was an attempt to replace these forms of legitimacy with democratic legitimacy via the National Transitional Council.

Gaddafi's legitimacy waned as his regime failed to benefit those of most need in the state. Although Libya has the world's ninth-largest known oil deposits and a population of only 6.5 million, in 2010, Gallup polls showed that 29% of young Libyans were unemployed, and 93% of young Libyans described their condition as “struggling” or “suffering.” As protestors took to the streets, Gaddafi dispatched tanks, jets, and mercenaries to attack them, inciting a string of defections and so further eroding his legitimacy as a ruler. The actual death count of these attacks is not known, as Gaddafi's regime shut out and shut down both world and local media and communications. However, Libya's militarily weak regime was eventually overcome, and Gaddafi was killed on October 20, 2011, leading to the disintegration of the regime.

Since Gaddafi's departure, tribal elders, NGOs, youth groups, town councils, and local brigades have stepped in to fill the power vacuum. There are many different tribes in Libya, not all of which have supported the regime change, making the establishment of a new form of legitimacy difficult. However, unlike Egypt, Libya has no entrenched officer class or judiciary to prolong or obstruct the country's transition to democracy. Since the revolution, no single group has been dominant, although several brigades, or katiba, have been able to exercise considerable strength.

These katiba are “armed fighting groups ranging from 20 to 200 young men, formed along neighborhood, town or regional lines.” These brigades were central to the military strength of the revolutionary forces. After Gaddafi's overthrow, the powerful brigades from Misrata and Zintan raided Tripoli, the Libyan capital, “pillaged automobiles, took over ministries and encamped at key institutions like the airport and oilfields” in order to gain political power.

In order to establish democratic legitimacy and sovereignty, the National Transitional Council has had to deal with these brigades, a process which has so far been mostly unsuccessful due to mistrust between the two bodies and the popularly illegitimate but regardless tangible military strength of the brigades. To firmly establish democratic legitimacy, the National Transitional Council is attempting to draft a new constitution. It has also struggled in this task, for which it is looking back to Libya's first constitution in 1951.

=== Yemen ===
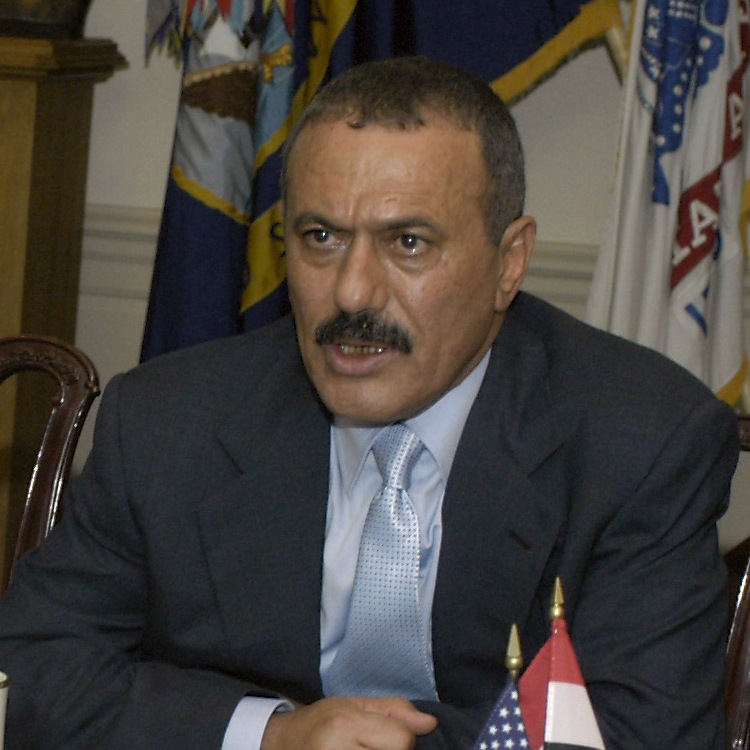
Former Yemeni president Ali Abdullah Saleh operated an extensive, primarily tribal patronage system in Yemen.

Even before the 2011 revolution, former Yemeni president Ali Abdullah Saleh’s regime’s legitimacy relied on a patronage network based on the entrenched Yemeni tribal system, effectively tying Saleh’s political legitimacy to the tribes’ much more established and trusted socio-political legitimacy. Yemen is historically tribal, with tribes being responsible for defense, keeping the peace, protecting and encouraging trade and markets, and either prohibiting or facilitating travel. For many Yemenis, tribal systems are “the main or only administrative system they know.” Tribes function effectively as local governments, introducing generators and water pumps, opening schools, and providing local services. Thus, for many “the state is not representative of the Yemeni nation to which they feel they belong.”

The Yemeni revolution, also part of the Arab Spring, was brought about by the loss of legitimacy by Saleh's regime. Yemeni youth wanted Saleh's resignation and “a more accountable and democratic system.” Though reform came slowly due to a lack of support from the international community and the poverty of the protestors – Yemen is the Arab world's poorest country – the anti-Saleh movement gained steam and high-level government officials and tribal leaders joined the opposition against Saleh. The most significant government official to join the revolutionary movement was Major General Ali Mohsin Al-Ahmar, who ordered his troops to defend antigovernment demonstrators.

Saleh was deposed and his successor, Abdu Rabu Mansour Hadi, was elected in an uncontested election to serve as head of the transitional government, which includes the oppositional bloc, the Joint Meeting parties (JMP), a five-party alliance including the leading Islamist party Islah and the Yemeni Socialist Party (YSP), the Nasirist Popular Unity Party, and two small Islamist Zaydi parties. The National Dialogue Conference, launched in March 2013, brought together 565 delegates from these parties in order to write a constitution and deal with longstanding challenges to Yemeni governance, such as counterterrorism, development, and the Southern Separatist Movement.

Although Yemen was the only country from the 2011 Arab Spring to emerge with a negotiated settlement with the current regime and a transition plan for a national dialogue, by 2013 there was “no significant redistribution of resources or hard power outside the traditional elite.” The vestiges of Saleh's regime and a lack of support from southern tribes plagued the National Dialogue Conference, which consequently finished four months later than expected, in January 2014. Further elections were indefinitely postponed, leading to speculation that Hadi and members of the parliament will keep their positions indefinitely. Due to these complications, there is currently no legitimate unifying political body in Yemen.

== International crises of legitimacy ==
The implications of an international crisis of legitimacy usually reach further than domestic crises, given that the actors have power over several different countries. International crises can threaten the stability between countries, increasing the probability for conflict.

=== The European Union ===
The European Union (E.U.) is a governing body over 28 European countries. The E.U. does not have complete legitimacy over the citizens of the 28 countries given that it only governs in the realm of politics and economics. Additionally, the E.U. does not operate under majority rule meaning any one country can veto laws. The E.U. suffered a legitimation crisis when it attempted to pass a constitution which failed in the 2005 French European Constitution referendum.

== In the United States ==
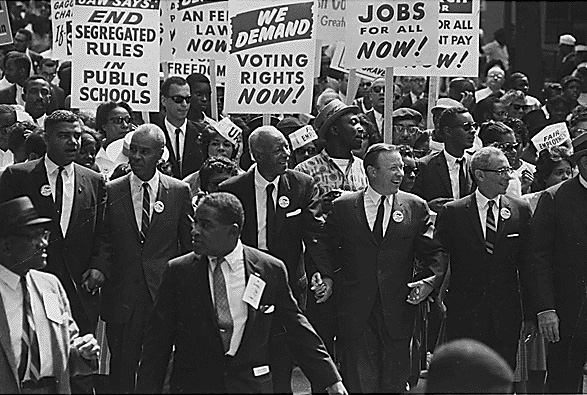
Civil Rights March on Washington, D.C. in August, 1963

=== 1950s through 1980s ===
In this time period, it was accepted by many political theorists that the United States was undergoing a crisis of legitimacy. Minorities in the United States began to question the legitimacy of the government because they felt they were being denied rights. The mindset was transferred into movements beginning in the Civil Rights Movement, which primarily involved African Americans and college students but eventually spread to a larger portion of the population. The United States government's reaction to the legitimation crisis of the late twentieth century shows that in a consolidated democracy, undergoing a legitimation crisis can strengthen legitimacy. In this case, the system adapted to the wants of the citizens and the United States re-established legitimacy.

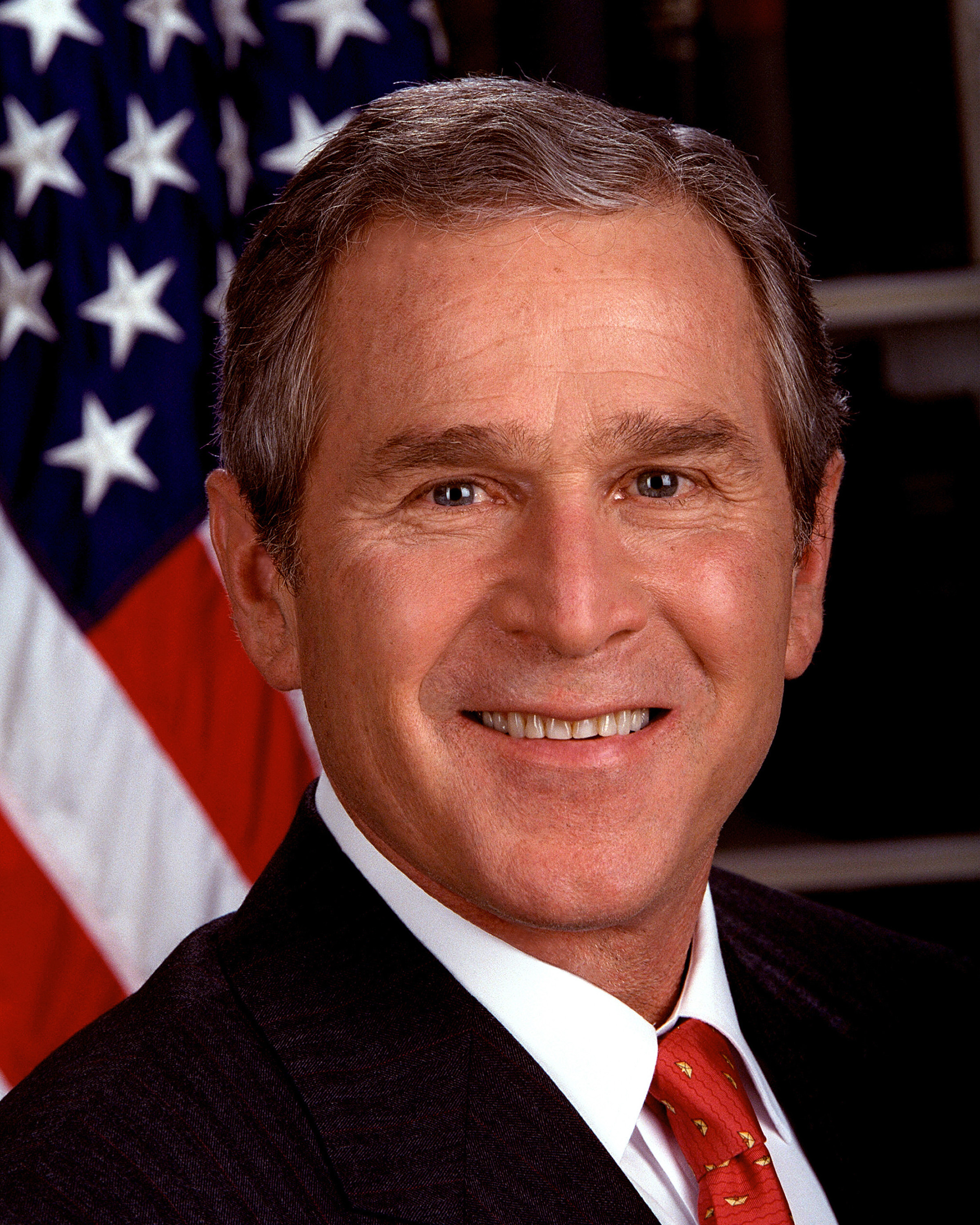
Al Gore and George Bush, the Democratic and Republican candidates for the 2000 presidential election.

In the mid-1960s, the legitimacy of the United States government was challenged when citizens began to question the legality of the Vietnam War.

=== 2000: Bush v. Gore reelection ===
In the United States 2000 presidential election, 2000 United States presidential election, Bush lost the popular vote but still won the electoral vote. Many United States citizens did not believe this was right. The legitimacy of the United States came into question after the Supreme Court Decision, Bush v. Gore. While some believe the legitimacy of the presidency came into question, others believe the legitimacy of the court was jeopardized after the decision was released In the aftermath of the decision, six hundred and seventy five law professors argued against the decision in The New York Times.

== Resolution ==
When an actor loses legitimacy, the public no longer trusts the actor to maintain a social contract. Without the social contract, the natural rights of the public, such as life, liberty, and property, are in jeopardy. Therefore, it is usually in the interest of both the public and the actor to end the legitimation crisis. There are several ways in which to end a legitimation crisis, but there is currently no unified theory as for the best method. Although the actor could be replaced, as seen in many of the examples above and effectively ending the legitimation crisis, this section will focus on the conflict resolution of the crisis. In this situation, the actor that was seeking legitimacy before the crisis regains legitimacy.

An actor can regain legitimacy in two ways:

1. Re-establish the base: realigning the political actions to the widely accepted social values and norms. In 1956 in Montgomery, Alabama, the more than year-long Montgomery bus boycott eventually led to repeal of the local ordinance for bus segregation. In this case, by realigning the laws to fit with public opinion, the government was able to regain legitimacy.
2. Coerce legitimacy: drawing on capital goods to create a "material source of power." In the Rwandan genocide in 1994, the loss of government legitimacy led to an outbreak in genocide. One of the political factions, the Hutu, killed thousands of members of the Tutsi party. The RPF had to rely on the capital goods of the international community, in the form of weapons and money, and thus were able to regain control and legitimacy in Rwanda.

== Chronology of legitimacy theories ==
Time	Work
423 B.C.	Thucydides. History of the Peloponnesian War
ca. 390 B.C.	Plato. The Republic
ca. 335-323 B.C.	Aristotle. Politics Aristotle. Nicomachean Ethics
1517	Machiavelli, N. Discourses on the First Ten Books of Titus Livius
1537	Machiavelli. N. The Prince
1690	Locke, J. Two Treatises of Government
1762	Rousseau, J. J. The Social Contract
1845-1847	Marx, K., & Engels, F. The German Ideology
1918	Weber, M. Economy and Society
1940	Mills, C. W. "Situated Actions and Vocabularies of Motive"
1947	Gramsci, A. Selection from the Prison Notebooks
1958	Austin, J. L. "A Plea for Excuses" Parsons, T. "Authority, Legitimation, and Political Actions"
1959	French, J.R.P., & Raven, B. "The Bases of Social Power" Lipset, S. M. "Some Social Requisites of Democracy: Economic Development and Political Legitimacy"
1961	Homans, G. C. Social Behavior: Its Elementary Forms
1963	Adams, J. S. "Towards an Undertaking of Inequity" Blau, P. "Critical Remarks on Weber's Theory of Legitimacy"
1965	Easton, D. A Systems Analysis of Political Life
1966	Berger, P., & Luckmann, T. The Social Construction of Reality
1968	Scott, M. B., & Lyman, S. M. "Accounts" Stinchcombe, A. Constructing Social Theories
1972	Berger, J., Zelditch, M., Cohen, B. P., & Anderson, B. "Structural Aspects of Distributive Justice: A Status Value Formulation"
1975	Dornbusch, S. M., & Scott, W. R. Evaluation and the Exercise of Authority Gamson, W. A. The Strategy of Social Protest Habermas, J. Legitimation Crisis
1977	McCarthy, J. D., & Zald, M. N. "Resource Mobilization and Social Movements: A Partial Theory" Meyer, J. W., & Rowan, B. "Institutionalized Organizations: Formal Structure as Myth and Ceremony"
1978	Linz, J. Crisis, Breakdown, and Re-equilibration Tilly, C. From Mobilization to Revolution Walter, E., Walster, G. W., and Berscheid, E. Equity: Theory and Research
1979	Meyer, J. W., & Hannan, M. National Development and the World System: Educational, Economic, and Political Change, 1950-1970
1980	Lerner, M. J. The Belief in a Last World: A Fundamental Delusion
1984	Zelditch, M., & Walker, H. "Legitimacy and the Stability of Authority"
1986	Ridgeway, C., & Berger, J. "Expectations, Legitimacy, and Dominance Behavior in Task Groups"
1994	Jost, J. T., & Banaji, M. R. "The Role of Stereotyping in System-Justification and the Production of False Consciousness"
1996	Sewell, W. H., Jr."Historical Events as Transformations of Structures: Inventing Revolution at the Bastille"
1998	Berger, J., Ridgeway, C., Fisek, M. H., & Norman, R. Z. "The Legitimation and Delegitimation of Power and Prestige Orders" Zelditch, M., & Floyd, A. S. "Consensus, Dissensus, and Justification"

Source: The Psychology of Legitimacy Emerging: Perspectives on Ideology, Justice, and Intergroup Relations

== See also ==
- Corruption
- Delegitimization
- Legitimacy (political)
- Organic crisis
