= Late capitalism =

Dominant post-WWII post-industrial global economy

Late capitalism is a concept in Marxist political economy, political science and sociology. It is used by social critics to describe the current or contemporary phase of capitalist civilization. The idea was first used by the German economist and sociologist Werner Sombart (1863–1941) to name the new social order which emerged in the aftermath of World War I. However, beyond some brief comments and outlines, Sombart never provided a systematic or comprehensive theory of late capitalism.

From the 1930s to the 1970s, the idea of "late capitalism" was used by European socialists as a label for a new form of state-regulated capitalism, with a meaning similar (but not identical) to the Marxist-Leninist theory of state monopoly capitalism. Gradually, terms like "neo-capitalism" and "late capitalism" were accepted by many Western Marxists and members of the Frankfurt School to describe the post-World War II social order. The Belgian economist and philosopher Ernest Mandel provided a comprehensive Marxist analysis in his 1972 book Late Capitalism and other writings, without however referring explicitly to Sombart's ideas. In Mandel's vision, late capitalism is the epoch of the bourgeois world society that unexpectedly arose out of World War II, as a new phase in the global history of capitalist imperialism.

In the 21st century era of the global internet, mobile telephones and artificial intelligence in social media, the idea of "late capitalism" is again used in left-wing political discussions about the decadence, degeneration, absurdities and ironies of contemporary business culture, often with the suggestion that capitalism is now getting near the end of its existence (or is already being transformed into a post-capitalism of some sort).

== Initial use of the term ==
The term late capitalism (German: Spätkapitalismus), sometimes also translated as late-stage capitalism, was first used in a 1925 publication by the German social scientist Werner Sombart (1863–1941) to describe the new capitalist order emerging out of World War I. Sombart claimed that it was the beginning of a new stage in the history of capitalism. His vision of the emergence, rise and decline of capitalism was influenced by Karl Marx and Friedrich Engels's interpretation of human history in terms of a sequence of different economic modes of production, each with a historically limited lifespan.

As a young man, Sombart was a socialist who associated with Marxist intellectuals and the German Social Democratic Party. Friedrich Engels praised Sombart's review of the first edition of Marx's Das Kapital Vol. 3 in 1894, and sent him a letter. As a mature academic who became well known for his own sociological writings, Sombart had a sympathetically critical attitude to the ideas of Karl Marx — seeking to criticize, modify and elaborate Marx's insights, while disavowing Marxist doctrinairism and dogmatism. This prompted a critique from Friedrich Pollock, a founder of the Frankfurt School at the Institute for Social Research. Sombart's clearly written texts and lectures helped to make "capitalism" a household word in Germany and beyond, as the name of a socioeconomic system with a specific structure and dynamic, a history, a mentality, a dominant morality and a culture.

== Later modern uses ==
The use of the term "late capitalism" to describe the nature of the modern epoch existed already for four decades in continental Europe, before it began to be used by academics and journalists in the English-speaking world — via English translations of German-language Critical Theory texts, and especially via Ernest Mandel's 1972 book Late Capitalism, published in English in 1975. Mandel's new theory of late capitalism was unrelated to Sombart's theory, and Sombart is not mentioned at all in Mandel's book.

For many Western Marxist scholars since that time, the historical epoch of late capitalism starts with the outbreak (or the end) of World War II (1939–1945), and includes the post–World War II economic expansion, the world recession of the 1970s and early 1980s, the era of neoliberalism and globalization, the 2008 financial crisis and the aftermath in a multipolar world society. Particularly in the 1970s and 1980s, many economic and political analyses of late capitalism were published. From the 1990s onward, the academic analyses focused more on the culture, sociology and psychology of late capitalism.

According to Google Books Ngram Viewer, the frequency of mentions per year of the term "late capitalism" in publications has steadily increased since the 1960s. Sociologist David Inglis states that "Various species of non-Marxist theorizing have borrowed or appropriated the general notion of historical 'lateness' from the original Marxist conception of 'late capitalism', and they have applied it to what they take to be the current form of 'modernity'." This leads to the idea of late modernity as a new phase in modern society. In recent years, there is also a revival of the concept of "late capitalism" in popular culture, but with a meaning that is different from previous generations. In 2017, an article in The Atlantic highlighted that the term "late capitalism" was again in vogue in America as an ironic term for modern business culture.

In contemporary academic or journalistic usage, "late capitalism" often refers to a new mix of:

1. Strong growth of the digital, electronics and military industries as well as their influence in society.
2. Economic concentration of corporations and banks, which control gigantic assets and market shares internationally.
3. Transition from Fordist mass production in huge assembly-line factories to Post-Fordist automated production and networks of smaller, more flexible manufacturing units supplying specialized markets.
4. Increasing economic inequality of income, wealth and consumption.
5. Consumerism on credit and the increasing indebtedness of the population.

In 2024, a Wall Street Journal writer complained that "Our universities teach that we are living in the End Times of 'late capitalism.'"

== Skepticism about late capitalism ==
In contemporary society, the validity of the concept of late capitalism is rejected by some and accepted by others, but academics have not debated the issue much in conferences and journals. There is relatively little recent literature on the subject that academics can refer to for ideas.

=== Open questions ===
The idea of "late capitalism" was never accepted by the majority of social scientists, economists and historians, for five types of reasons:

It was considered that the expression was tinged with illiberal political biases about capitalism, and/or because it is unknowable or uncertain whether capitalism is "on its last legs", or "if and when it will end". The German-American economist Hans Philip Neisser, a lecturer at the New School of Social Research, stated in 1954 that:

"The vital power of all civilizations and all economic systems some day declines and comes to an end. At what point will the free enterprise system definitely reach its old age? I do not know of any scientific way to determine this moment in advance."

=== Inequality paradox ===
In 2001, Ankie Hoogvelt stated:

"The Human Development Report 1999 notes that between 1980 and 1996, gross national product (GNP) per capita declined in no less than fifty-nine countries. It reports that the income gap between the fifth of the world's population living in the richest countries, and the fifth in the poorest, widened from 30 to 1 in 1960 to 74 to 1 in 1997, and that income disparities increased in many countries, including the rich, during the 1980s and the 1990s. (...) the rising fortunes of new regions and groups of countries in the world economy, and the decline of others, should not blind us to the way that wealth and poverty are connected."

The Human Development Report 2019 shows what (still rising) economic inequality actually means. So the reply to the skeptics is that capitalism can still make life better for a part of the world population, but not for all – the majority of the world population do not benefit very much from it, get no benefit from it, or are worse off. If we focus only on well-off people in the advanced (or advancing) capitalist countries, we only get a part of the total picture. The independent thinktank Council on Foreign Relations stated in April 2022:

"Income and wealth inequality is higher in the United States than in almost any other developed country, and it is rising."

Total US GDP still does show growth, but for roughly half the US population, their GDP does not grow much at all. In September 2025, BBC News reported:

There's a divide in the US economy between the haves and the have-nots. (...) [McDonald's CEO Chris Kempczinski stated]: "It's really kind of a two-tier economy"... [Ryan Sweet, chief US economist at Oxford Economics stated]: "When you peel back the layers of the onion, it's clear that we have a very bifurcated consumer".

The Wall Street Journal reported in February 2025 that according to Moody's Analytics, the top 10% of US households by income (who earn more than $250,000 per year) now account for 49.7% (almost half) of all consumer spending in America. This contrasted with 36% in 1989. The wealthy had been able to increase their spending faster than the rate of inflation, but everyone else had not.

=== Blotting out inequality ===
In the lead-up to the 2024 US presidential election, which was won by Donald Trump, liberal economists were alarmed when they discovered that large numbers of ordinary people were siding against the Democratic Party candidates. How could this be the case, if the post-pandemic recovery was going so well, GDP was going up, and inflation was coming down? In a CNN interview with Erin Burnett, president Joe Biden stated "the fact is that if you look at what the mean [i.e. average] people have, they have the money to spend" and he claimed that in reality people were angry about other issues, such as shrinkflation and corporate greed. Mr Brad Bannon, a Democratic Party strategist, advised back then that "It's time for a change. Not in presidents but in the incumbent's economic message." But the White House had a different idea.

An alternative explanation is that ordinary people of modest means were very well aware of their situation, and also about the candidates, but that in their own situation, the cost of living did rise strongly so that consumer prices were permanently at a much higher level, while their own inflation-adjusted after-tax income hardly increased and job opportunities were scarce. That was their reality, just as "real" as the reality of high-GDP wealthy people. They were more likely to vote against Biden/Harris, or not to vote at all.

Liberal economists could not understand this, precisely because the liberal economists were fixated on "total GDP" and "grand-average" statistics for the whole country. This concealed the economic reality of inequality. It is a reason why Thomas Piketty advocates standard statistical measures of the distribution of real disposable income and net wealth. Such measures are needed to restore objectivity to economic science. In 2018, Harvard economist Larry Summers published an article in the Financial Times about his holiday trip, driving cross-country from Chicago to Portland, Oregon:

“Economists like me see the world through the prism of models, fitted to statistical data and tested against market realities. (…) But there are other ways of gaining understanding about an economy and its workers. (…) What I saw on my trip was how profoundly different ways of life are within the US.”

Senator Bernie Sanders has argued – echoing Martin Luther King Jr. – that there are Two Americas, where people live in two completely different worlds – and it is therefore misleading to represent them as if they are one homogenous unit with "average" lifestyles. The New York Times reported that "The U.S. economy in 2025 is split in two: Everything tied to artificial intelligence is booming. Just about everything else is not." These insights about inequality are not a small matter — a recent scientific study offers evidence for the claim that "economic inequality is one of the strongest predictors of where and when democracy erodes."

=== Making capitalism affordable again ===
Straight after losing the 2024 election and throughout 2025, the "managerialist" US Democrats invested heavily in focus group research and survey research by party-linked pollsters and market research firms to understand voter attitudes, especially among groups where the Democrats lost ground. They wanted to find out via reports to party leaders why support for the Democrats had eroded, and how they might win the hearts and minds of the people next time.

The conclusion reached by September 2025 was that ordinary Americans were concerned most of all about "affordability" — a "populist" problem they appear to have, and that the wealthy US elites apparently do not have. That was precisely the voter sentiment which the liberals had, despite good advice, deliberately dismissed during the election campaign in 2024 — to their peril. On 18 December 2025, the US Democrats said that they would not release the official "autopsy report" on what went wrong in the 2024 presidential election, because "a public airing of its failures would distract from focusing on winning future elections".

Alexandria Ocasio-Cortez argued already in March 2025 that the US Democratic Party "can come together around fighting for the little guy and gal", a core value she insisted "does not belong to any particular ideological camp — or at least shouldn't." Ocasio-Cortez said she believes "economic populism is the path forward". That would involve winning votes with plans to reverse the cutbacks of US welfare state provisions (education, housing, healthcare, social security, labour rights, civil rights, culture etc.) and redistributing income and wealth. However, this does not yet solve the fiscal problem of creating the wealth that can repay the gigantic US public debt.

A Wall Street Journal writer commented in November 2025 that "Trump and Mamdani both campaigned on affordability, but the issue is amorphous and poorly defined" and that "There is nothing any elected official can do to "solve" the affordability crisis reliably". In early December 2025, the liberal Financial Times admitted a growing rich-poor gap in the United States, but argued that the importance of this theme is that it would be a political liability for President Trump, on the road to the mid-term elections. Popular discontent about the inequality issue could cost Mr Trump a lot of political support. The editorial board of the Financial Times affirmed explicitly that 'America's affordability crunch is real', and that it got worse under Mr Trump's reign which had "added to the squeeze".

For the majority of Americans, the “affordability” complaint as detected by the Democrats seems to refer mainly to five things: the high costs of healthcare, education, and housing; the costs of raising a family; and retirement finance. Stylized from a Democrat perspective, the relevant insight is that a middle-class lifestyle is out of reach for a growing number of upwardly mobile people. However, a January 2026 survey by Data for Progress suggested that the concern about "living costs" really referred to price rises everywhere, across the board:

"... voters are still upset about inflation — in January 2025, 70% of voters said that “inflation or costs of goods” were getting worse for people like them. One year later, 74% of voters now say the same. (…) as much as voters are upset about their wallets being pinched, they still don’t trust that Democrats will bring down prices. Less than 4 in 10 voters think that Trump (37%), the Democratic Party (36%), and the Republican Party (34%) have a solution for the cost of living. For Democrats hoping to win the midterms on an affordability agenda, it’s a sign there’s still much more to do to win people over."

=== Unsustainable capitalism ===
One reason the concept of late capitalism is used today is the belief that contemporary capitalism could become unsustainable if debt grows persistently faster than value-added and job-creating investment, if inflation develops into stagflation, if investors withdraw from governments and large-scale capital flight occurs, or if creditors ultimately refuse to lend. In this view, inequality could become harmful to the broader economy. Excess debt, both public and private, could become a memento mori for capitalism.

For decades, Americans were encouraged to finance their lifestyles by buying on credit, while for the majority, their real buying power did not rise very much at all. Consumer price-levels and cost-structures rose faster than after-tax incomes adjusted for inflation, leading to increased imports of cheap foreign goods. Private debt levels kept increasing, and interest rates on US creditcard debt have become very high. During and after the COVID-19 pandemic a lot of extra money was pumped into the economy, which pushed up inflation rates and raised price levels by large amounts. The relationship between buying power and consumer prices went out of kilter, and is becoming unsustainable, meaning that poverty increases.

Pessimists argue that it must lead to another "credit crunch" adjustment in the future, sooner or later, possibly when the AI bubble pops. Billionaire investor Stan Druckenmiller predicted in September 2018 that the next financial crisis would likely be worse than the last one, because of skyrocketing debt loads. "We have this massive debt problem. We tripled down on what caused the [last] crisis. And we tripled down on it globally." A critical event somewhere could trigger a spiral of debt defaults that becomes uncontrollable, when investors stampede in a markets panic, and very rapidly withdraw huge amounts of money or freeze their funds.

Wolfgang Streeck judged in 2014 that:

...unlike the 1970s, we may now really be near the end of the postwar political-economic formation – an end which, albeit in a different way, was foretold and even wished for in the crisis theories of 'late capitalism'. What I feel sure about is that the clock is ticking for democracy as we have come to know it, as it is about to be sterilized as redistributive mass democracy and reduced to a combination of the rule of law and public entertainment.

== Intellectual history of the idea ==
=== Marxist precursors ===
Ever since the famous theoretical controversy between orthodox Marxists and revisionists in the 1890s, socialists have been discussing the decline, breakdown and collapse of bourgeois society. There were many attempts at theoretical and mathematical proofs of the decline and collapse of capitalism. There were also attempts to create a perspective on the nature of the epoch and the future of society, to guide political action.

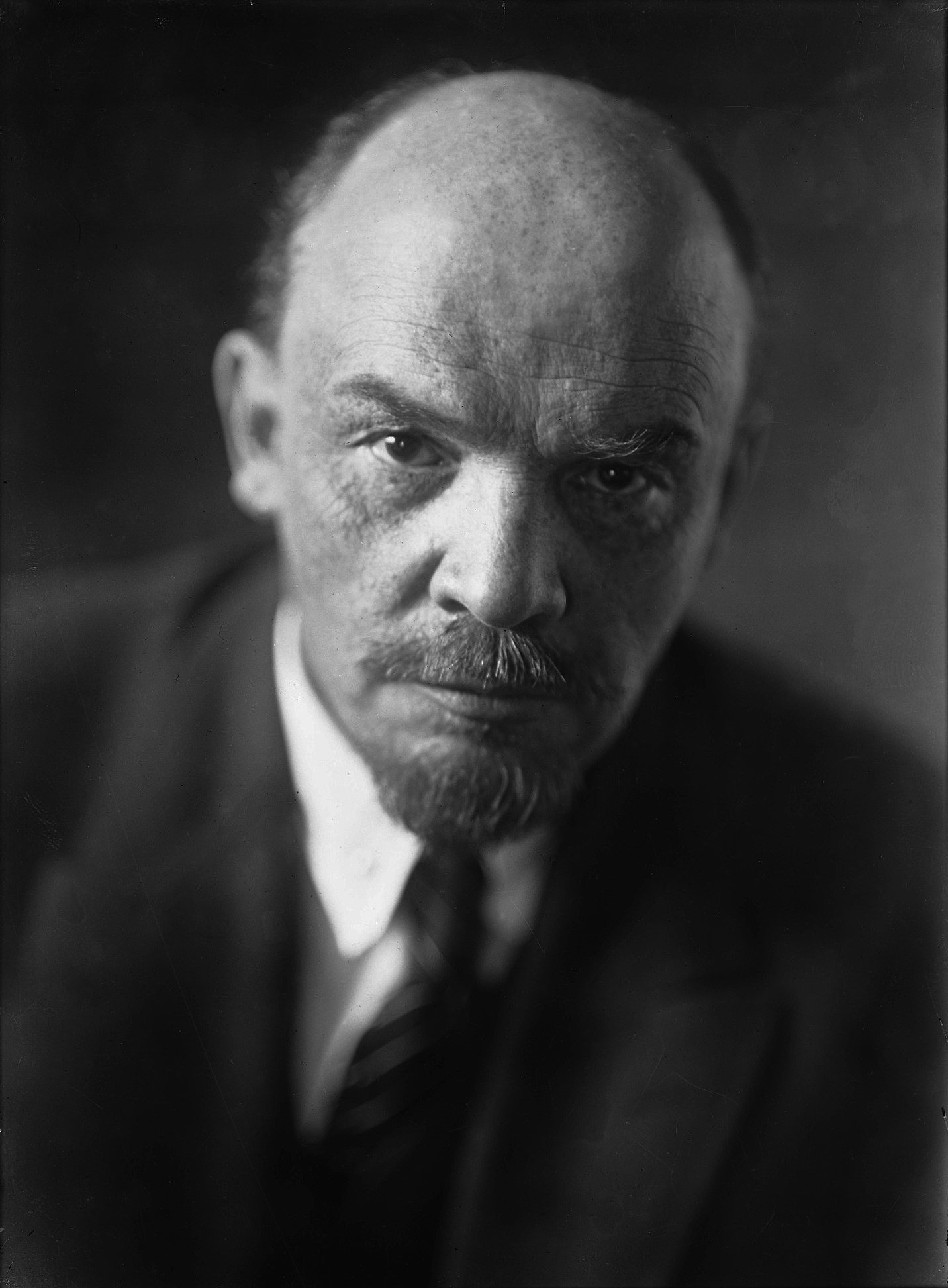
Vladimir Lenin claimed that no situation is absolutely hopeless for capitalism and that an anti-capitalist political revolution must actively overthrow it, lest it recovers.

The Russian revolutionary Vladimir Lenin famously declared in 1920 that there are no "absolutely hopeless situations" for capitalism; unless an anti-capitalist political revolution overthrows the rule of the bourgeoisie, the capitalist system can always recover sooner or later. Lenin considered that the fate of capitalism was essentially a political issue: it depended on the outcome of class struggles. The leaders of the Communist International (founded in 1919) believed that with the First World War, a new world epoch of wars and revolutions had begun — the epoch of capitalist decline. The communists were not wrong, because there was hardly a year in the 20th century without wars somewhere on the planet, and there were two world wars which drastically changed world society (see Lists of wars in the 20th century and List of revolutions and rebellions). The Comintern programme defined imperialism as the highest and final stage of capitalism. According to Lenin,

"More and more prominently there emerges, as one of the tendencies of imperialism, the creation of the "rentier state", the usurer state, in which the bourgeoisie to an ever-increasing degree lives on the proceeds of capital exports and by "clipping coupons". It would be a mistake to believe that this tendency to decay precludes the rapid growth of capitalism. It does not. In the epoch of imperialism, certain branches of industry, certain strata of the bourgeoisie and certain countries betray, to a greater or lesser degree, now one and now another of these tendencies. On the whole, capitalism is growing far more rapidly than before; but this growth is not only becoming more and more uneven in general, its unevenness also manifests itself, in particular, in the decay of the countries which are richest in capital (Britain)."

The term "late capitalism" was generally not used by Marxist-Leninists. They used the concept of state monopoly capitalism (originally formulated by Lenin) to denote the highest developmental stage of capitalism. Many non-Marxist historians and sociologists, however, have preferred more neutral terms, such as the "late modern era" or "post-modern era". Some Continental and Anglo-Saxon historians refer to late bourgeois society, in contrast to early bourgeois society in the 17th and 18th century and classical bourgeois society in the 19th and early 20th century.

=== Sombart's influence and legacy ===
The term "late capitalism" was first defined by the German social scientist Werner Sombart in a 1925 reference article about the characteristics and development of capitalism and in the third volume of Der Moderne Kapitalismus (completed in 1926, published in 1927). The term also occurs in a 1928 publication of Sombart's text for a lecture on transformations in capitalism. Only the first volume of Sombart's three-volume Modern capitalism — a very influential work in its time — has been translated into English so far. A comprehensive English introduction to Modern capitalism was published in 1933. Sombart divided the history of capitalism into four main stages of development:

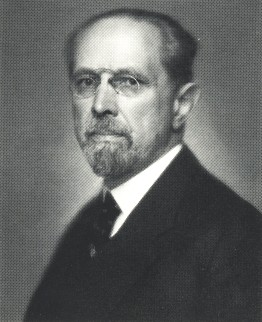
Werner Sombart first defined the term "late capitalism".

- Pre-capitalist economy (vorkapitalistische Wirtschaft) from the early Middle Ages up to 1500 AD, the subject of the first volume of Modern capitalism (in two parts, published in 1902/1903, with four more editions in 1913–1941).
- Early capitalism (Frühkapitalismus) from the 1500s to 1760, dealt with in the second volume (in two parts, published in 1906/1907, with another edition in 1913 and 1928).
- Advanced capitalism (Hochkapitalismus) from 1760 to the beginning of World War I in 1914, the subject of the third volume (in two parts, published in 1927, with another edition in 1932 and 1941).
- Late capitalism (Spätkapitalismus) since then, referred to sporadically in the third volume and discussed in a few lectures and articles.

In the introduction to the third volume of Modern capitalism, Sombart remarks that he considered it one of his (modest) achievements, that his concepts of "early capitalism, high capitalism, late capitalism" had become "common knowledge" in scientific circles, and were accepted in ordinary language. In the last parts of the third volume of Modern Capitalism, Sombart discussed recent new developments in different sectors of the capitalist economy (which Marx apparently had not foreseen), and he speculated about economic life in the future. But he remained cautious, and was reluctant to venture bold predictions (in later editions of the volumes of Modern capitalism, he introduced revisions and alterations). Broadly speaking, he viewed late capitalism as an epoch of relative economic stagnation, characterized by bureaucratic regulation, some nationalized industries, and indicative macroeconomic planning.

For Sombart, the visible signs of the end of high capitalism in the last years before 1914 included the end of the "purely naturalistic mode of existence of capitalism with normative ideas"; the dethronement of the pursuit of profit as the sole determining factor of economic behavior; the decline of economic dynamism and risktaking in economic development; the shift from free competition to industrial cartels; and the statutory corporatization of enterprises. In the last parts of the third volume of Modern Capitalism,

In his own approach, Sombart emphasized, it is always the "capitalist spirit" that shapes the historical epoch, including the economic era. A new epoch begins, when the capitalist spirit has undergone a transformation. In its heyday, Sombart explained, capitalism brought the merchant spirit to its "greatest bloom". The constant search for the best sales opportunities, the quick adaptation to daily changes in the markets, the titillating competition for customers — all these were essential traits of Hochkapitalismus. The system of economic organization in advanced capitalism was a "fluid" one. By contrast, late capitalism is a "bureaucratized capitalism", in which the spirit of commerce has vanished. The demise of the commercial spirit is not the cause of the bureaucratization of capitalism, but rather its expression; it could only eventuate when conditions had become so stable, that buying and selling occurred without much real marketing effort. At that stage, a "rigid system" already existed, and this was "typical" of late capitalism.

In Modern Capitalism, Sombart did not present anything like a full-fledged, systematic synthesis of the emerging new capitalist order. That work still remained to be done. Concluding his 1928 Zürich lecture on the transformations of capitalism, Sombart stated:

"Today we are in a new era. It is obvious that [the beginning of] the new epoch is defined by the [first] World War. What this period is called is to an extent arbitrary, although of course some names will be more appropriate than others in particular situations. I have suggested the term 'late capitalism', because I know of no other expression which characterizes this era better. I hope that this term will be favourably received; I am aware, of course, of how much aversion there is, particularly among [academic] colleagues, to accepting unfamiliar new terminology – as Max Weber once put it: 'as if it were a question of using someone else's toothbrush.' There is always a possibility that other expressions will prevail. But what is most important is not the name, but the phenomenon itself, the thesis that this is a new era of economic life, as well as the issue of the characteristics of this era. If agreement can be reached about that, I would consider my task fullfilled".

Other than a few articles and lectures, however, Sombart did not publish any comprehensive treatise on late capitalism. His thinking about the topic was disrupted in 1933 by the new Nazi government, when he was 70 years old (he died in 1941, when he was 78). Like many other leading German intellectuals, he wanted to survive as a scholar, and he hoped that Hitler's leadership would revive Germany from almost two decades of war, economic woes, social decay and human misery. There exists no evidence that he ever became a card-carrying member of the Nazi party, but he did begin to espouse a new sociological theory of "German socialism" (in opposition to e.g. Jewish socialism and Marxism). In his new typology of different socialisms, Nazism was the concrete expression of German socialism. Whatever his real motives were, Sombart rhetorically aligned himself with the Nazi movement, while saving the integrity and consistency of his own scholarly perspective and retaining his intellectual independence, as a respected emeritus.

Because of his apparent Nazi sympathies in his last years and his sociological portrayals of Jews and Judaism in some of his writings, Sombart was often stereotyped as a "Nazi intellectual" and as antisemitic. It meant that after World War II, his writings and ideas largely vanished from university curriculae. Only in the 1980s and 1990s did significant scholarly interest in Sombart's intellectual legacy begin to revive, with new appraisals of particular themes in his large oeuvre.

=== Interwar years and World War II ===
In the post–World War I reconstruction era, many of the wartime regulations in Europe continued, and the state played the leading role in repairing, rebuilding and reorganizing society. According to historian Edward H. Carr, "In Europe after 1919, the planned economy... became the practice, if not the theory, of almost every state." This had a strong influence on how the post-war order was interpreted by social scientists. Addressing the Kiel congress of the German Social-Democratic Party in 1927, Rudolf Hilferding claimed that:

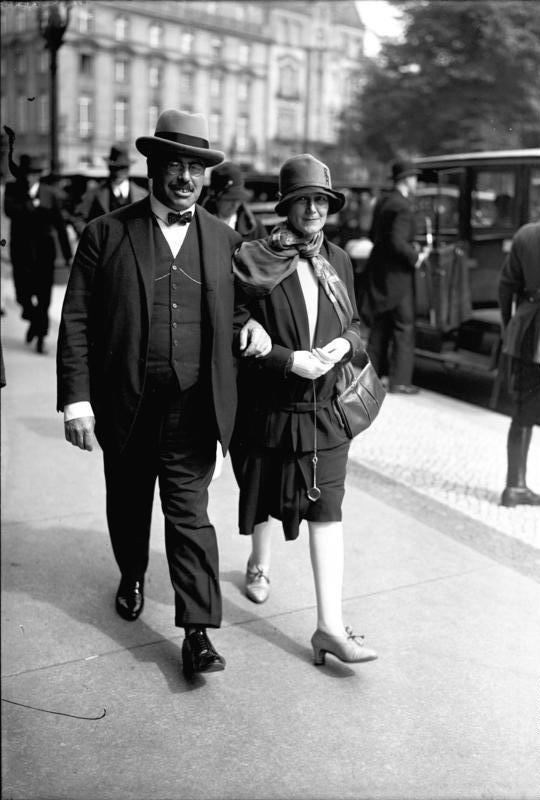
Rudolf Hilferding and his wife, walking to the Reichstag in Berlin in June 1928

"In reality, organized capitalism means that the capitalist principle of laissez-faire is replaced by the socialist principle of planned production. This planned, deliberately managed form of economy is much more susceptible to the conscious influence of society, which means to the influence of the... compulsory organization of the whole of society, the state."

The term "late capitalism" began to be used by socialists in continental Europe in the 1930s and 1940s, in the context of the Great Depression and World War 2. At that time, it was not an especially radical turn of phrase, because many people of different political persuasions really believed that the existing social order was doomed, or was at least ripe for renewal and transformation. The European economy became highly regulated, and that reached a peak during the years of war economy in 1939–45.

During World War II, even leading American economists believed that the economic problems might eventually become insurmountable. In their book Capitalism since World War II, Philip Armstrong, Andrew Glyn and John Harrison commented that:

"Paul Samuelson, who later wrote the bestselling economics textbook published in the postwar years, raised in 1943 the probability of a 'nightmarish combination of the worst features of inflation and deflation', fearing that 'there would be ushered in the greatest period of unemployment and industrial dislocation which any economy has ever faced' (Samuelson, 1943, p. 51). He was speaking, it should be remembered, about the United States, which was relatively unscathed by hostilities. [...] Joseph Schumpeter, an eminent economist, summed up the mood of alarm of the early forties: 'The all but general opinion seems to be that capitalist methods will be unequal to the task of reconstruction.' He regarded it as 'not open to doubt that the decay of capitalist society is very far advanced' (Schumpeter, 1943, p, 120)."

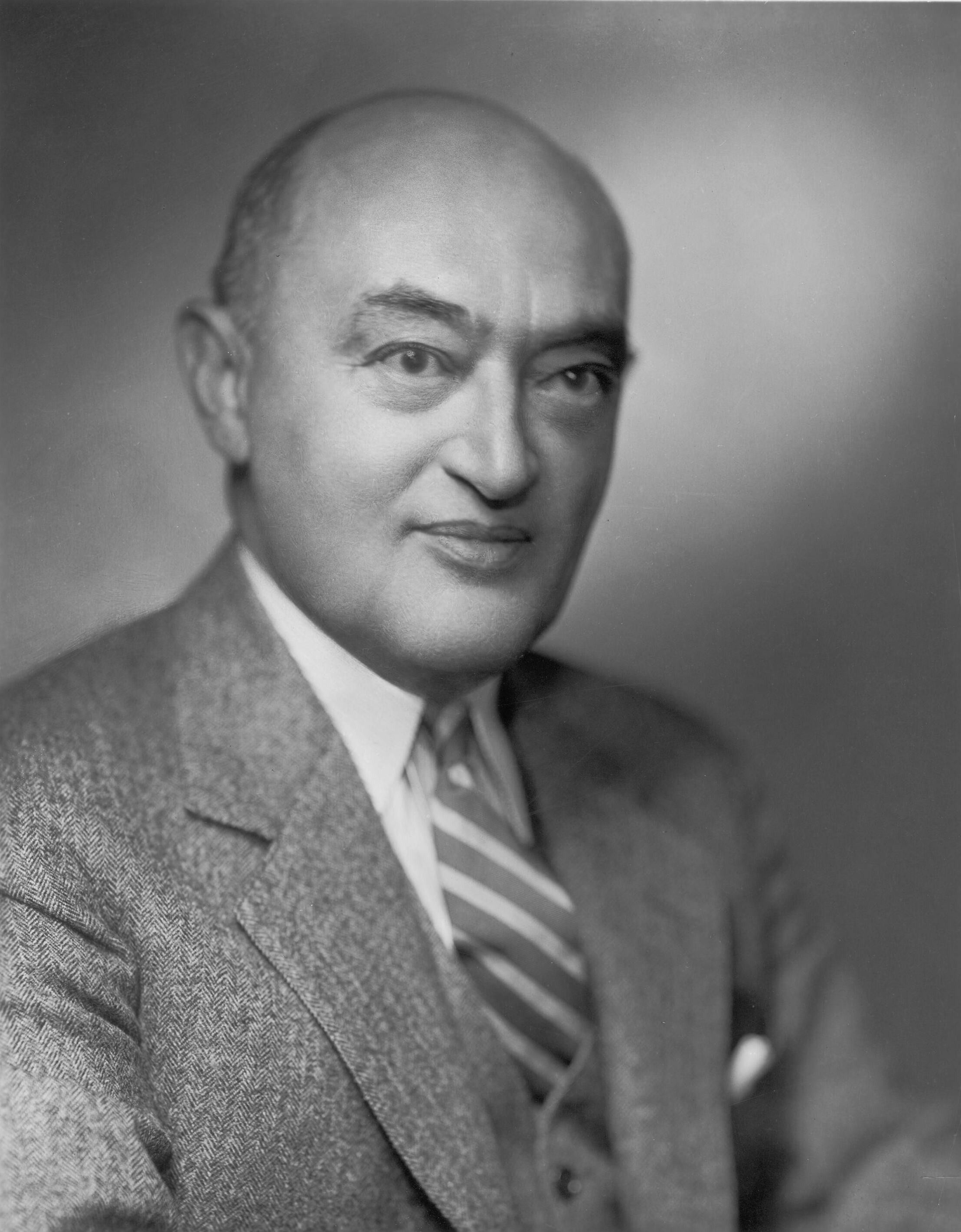
Joseph Schumpeter at Harvard University, 1945

In his book Capitalism, socialism and democracy (1943), Schumpeter also stated:

"Can capitalism survive? No. I do not think it can. But this opinion of mine, like that of every other economist who has pronounced upon the subject, is in itself completely uninteresting. What counts in any attempt at social prognosis is not the Yes or No that sums up the facts and arguments which lead up to it but those facts and arguments themselves. (...) The thesis I shall endeavor to establish is that... [the very success of capitalism] undermines the social institutions which protect it, and "inevitably" creates conditions in which it will not be able to live and which strongly point to socialism as the heir apparent."

=== Post–World War II era ===
In Russia, the Marxist-Leninist doctrine of the (deepening) "general crisis of capitalism" in the imperialist epoch, and the theory of state monopoly capitalism, defined the official government perspective for the postwar era. The historian Paolo Spriano describes how this caused the dismissal of one of Russia's top economists, after he dared to suggest that there would not be a deep capitalist crisis after the end of World War II:

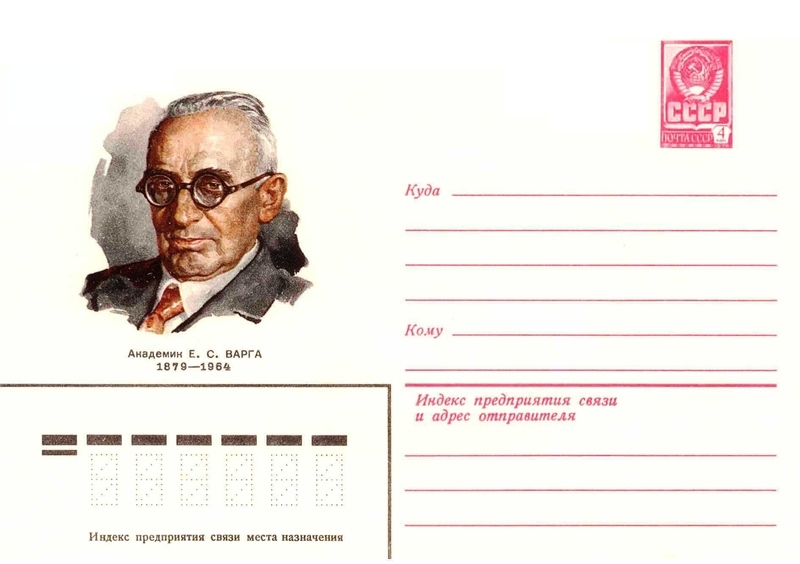
1979 Soviet postal cover featuring a portrait of Eugen Varga

"Eugen Varga... argued that capitalism would be able to ward off, or at least to postpone, a general crisis. By May 1947 he was being subject to harsh criticism for this. He was soon relieved of many of his duties, and the Institute of World Economy and Politics, of which he had been the director, was closed down. The official line was that the capitalist system was poised on the brink of a catastrophic crisis. Indeed, the virulence and imperialist aggressivity of capitalism were said to result precisely from desperate attempts to avert this crisis by provoking tension, conflict, and war. Propagandistic use of this thesis became common in subsequent years".

In the West, there had been similar expectations (across the whole political spectrum) that a severe systemic crisis would very likely occur after the war. When that did not happen, it was a surprise and a relief. However, what exactly could explain this turn of events is open to debate. Different theories about the success of the postwar reconstruction effort have been proposed.

One of the big geopolitical changes during and after World War 2 was the decolonization of many former colonies, often spearheaded by national liberation movements. To many observers, this trend signalled the end of the "classical" era of capitalist imperialism, and the start of a new global epoch, or at least a qualitative change in the global balance of power and the global states system. The socialist bloc of countries led by the Soviet Union and the People's Republic of China seemed to be gaining ground, suggesting that on a world scale, capitalism really was in decline.

The capitalism emerging from post-war reconstruction appeared to many analysts as a new type of capitalism, even although some of its traditional characteristics remained the same. This raised the question, "if capitalism had changed, how much did it change, and what was different or new about it? What are the political implications?". Particularly after the death of Joseph Stalin and the "thaw" of the official communist movement, this issue became a hot topic of debate at many leftwing conferences and in many books. The controversy continued in numerous journals, including Monthly Review and New Left Review. According to professors Michael Charles Howard and John Edward King,

"At the end of the Second World war many Marxian (and some non-Marxian) economists [had] anticipated that a severe economic downturn, possibly in the same league as the Great Depression, would follow hard on the heels of the peace. When, a dozen years later, the expected crisis had still not materialized and the accumulation of capital was still proceeding rapidly and smoothly in the advanced capitalist countries, the Marxists were under pressure to reappraise their entire political economy."

The concept of "late capitalism" was used in the 1960s, 1970s and 1980s in Europe by Western Marxists, socialists and other leftwing thinkers. Some examples can be mentioned to illustrate their concerns:

- In 1965, Fritz Vilmar published Rüstung und Abrüstung im Spätkapitalismus ["Armament and Disarmament in Late Capitalism"].
- Leo Michielsen and Andre Gorz popularized the term "neo-capitalism" in France and Belgium, with new analyses of postwar capitalism.
- In 1968, Rudi Dutschke, a leading spokesman of the German student revolt, published a pamphlet entitled "The contradictions of late capitalism, the anti-authoritarian students and their relationship to the third world."
- Theodor Adorno preferred "late capitalism" over "industrial society," which was the theme of the 16th Congress of German Sociologists in 1968.
- In 1971, Leo Kofler published a book called Technologische Rationalität im Spätkapitalismus ("Technological Rationality in Late Capitalism").
- Claus Offe published his essay "Spätkapitalismus – Versuch einer Begriffsbestimmung" ("Late Capitalism—an Attempt at a Conceptual Definition") in 1972.
- In 1972, Alfred Sohn-Rethel published Die ökonomische Doppelnatur des Spätkapitalismus.
- In 1973, Jürgen Habermas published his Legitimationsprobleme im Spätkapitalismus (Legitimacy problems in late capitalism).
- In 1975, Ernest Mandel published his 1972 PhD thesis Late Capitalism in English at New Left Books.
- In 1979, Volker Ronge published Bankpolitik im Spätkapitalismus: politische Selbstverwaltung des Kapitals?, a study of banking in late capitalism.
- In 1980, Herbert Marcuse also accepted the term in his reflections about the future of capitalism and socialism.
- In 1981, Winfried Wolf and Michel Capron extended Mandel's analysis of the long recession in Spätkapitalismus in den achtziger Jahren.
- Jacques Derrida preferred neo-capitalism to post- or late-capitalism.

From the mid-1970s to the 1980s, the use of the concept of late capitalism spread to English-speaking countries.

=== Ernest Mandel's perspective ===
When Ernest Mandel adopted the term "late capitalism", he had in mind the perspectives of Lenin, Trotsky and the Communist International about the 20th century. The theoretical framework was, that the world-historical epoch of capitalist decline began with World War 1 (or even earlier, with the uprising in St Petersburg in 1905). Mandel regarded "late capitalism" as a new historical stage within the epoch of capitalist imperialism; contrary to expectations in the interwar years, the labour movement suffered heavy defeats, and world capitalism had gained a new 'lease of life'. Mandel did not abandon Lenin's analysis of imperialism, but modified it, in the light of the experience of the post-World War 2 reconstruction era, decolonization and the global political impact of Stalinism and Marxism-Leninism. So the term "late" in "late capitalism" referred to the unexpected and belated revival and "third age" of capitalism after World War II, seemingly contradicting the orthodox Leninist theory of capitalist decline.

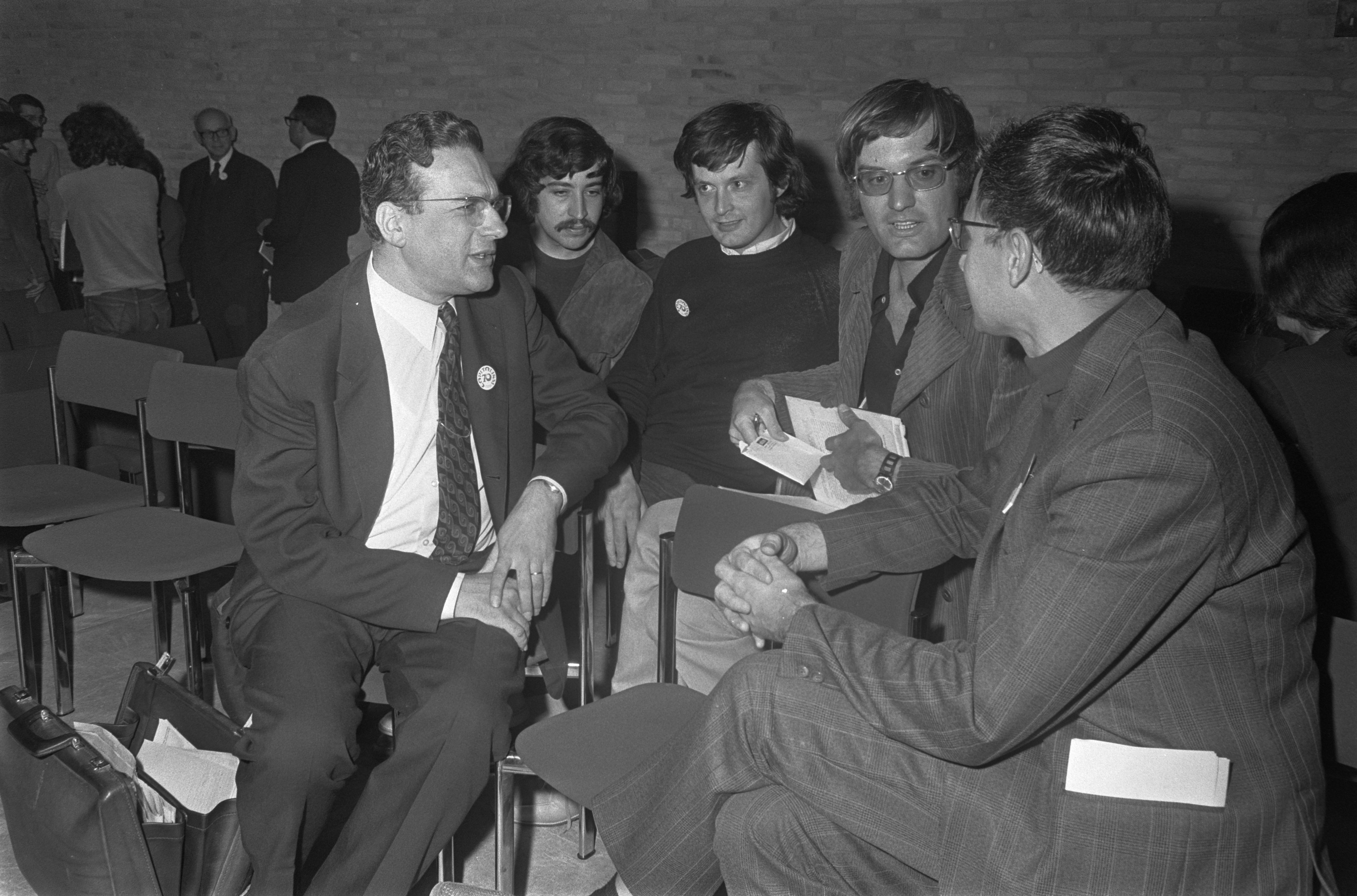
Ernest Mandel, talking with academics at the "Capitalism in the 1970s" conference (Tilburg Polytech, the Netherlands), 10 September 1970

Mandel aimed specifically to explain the long economic boom during 1947–73, which showed the fastest economic growth ever seen in human history. His analyses stimulated new interest in the theory of long waves in economic development. The chapters for his book Late capitalism were put together quite rapidly, using earlier draft texts and reading notes as well as lecture notes written when Mandel was visiting lecturer in Berlin in 1970/71. Obtaining a Phd degree was crucial for Mandel (in his late 40s) to secure a permanent academic position. In 1970, the professors Jan Craeybeckx (1923–2011) and Marcel Liebman (1929–1986) helped Mandel get a lectureship at the Free University of Brussels. Mandel obtained a professorship there in 1986, after publishing more than a dozen books and many articles, and he stayed there until retirement and as emeritus.

According to Ernest Mandel, late capitalism involves the commodification and industrialisation of more and more parts of the economy and society, where human services are turned into commercial products. Mandel believed that "[f]ar from representing a 'post-industrial society', late capitalism [...] constitutes generalized universal industrialization for the first time in history". At the same time, the role of the state in the economy and society kept growing. During and after World War II, the size of enterprises, ownership concentration and the scale of mass production increased, the activities of multinational corporations expanded, and there were more and more attempts at coordinated economic planning (or "economic programming") for huge capital investments.

Until the late 1960s, Mandel preferred to use the term "neo-capitalism", which was most often used by leftwing intellectuals in Belgium and France at that time. This idea drew attention to the fact that new characteristics of capitalism had emerged in its postwar recovery. At the time, however, ultraleftist Marxists objected to the term "neo-capitalism", because, according to them, it might suggest that capitalism was no longer capitalism, and this would lead to reformist deviations rather than to the total overthrow of capitalism. The proof of this seemed to be that Mandel argued—at the zenith of the capitalist postwar boom—for "anti-capitalist structural reforms".

Mandel distinguished three main historical stages in the development of the capitalist mode of production:

- Freely competitive capitalist production, roughly from 1700 to 1870, through the growth of industrial capital in national (domestic) markets, especially in Western Europe and North America.
- The phase of monopoly capitalism, roughly from 1870 to 1940 was characterized by the imperialist competition for international markets, export of capital and the exploitation of colonial territories. The world was carved up into spheres of influence, in which each great power had its own empire containing colonies, semi-colonies and dependent territories.
- The epoch of late capitalism emerging out of the Second World War, which has as its dominant features the multinational corporation, globalization, consumerism, decolonization and increasingly internationalized financial markets. Characteristic of this epoch are corporate self-financing, a great expansion of foreign direct investment, and the formation of global systems regulating credit, currencies, commodities and capital assets.

The French edition of Mandel's Late Capitalism was titled The third age of capitalism.

In part, Mandel's analysis was a critique of Henryk Grossmann's breakdown theory. According to Grossmann, capitalism would collapse after a series of business cycles, because of insufficient surplus value production. Mandel also criticized the methodological approach of Rudolf Hilferding, Rosa Luxemburg, Nikolai Bukharin, Otto Bauer, Michal Kalecki, and Charles Bettelheim. One of Mandel's aims was to revive interest in, and re-evaluate, the classical discussions in Marxian economics (savagely repressed in the Stalinist modernization era) in a new historical setting. He argued that important qualitative changes occurred in the functioning of the capitalist system during and after World War II. Intermediate between the periodization of business cycles across two centuries and the (postulated) ultimate collapse of capitalism, Mandel argued, there were epochs of faster and slower economic growth.

In the history of the capitalist mode of production since the 1820s, "long waves" of economic growth could be observed in time series data on economic activity. These waves typically lasted about 20 to 25 years, from peak to trough or from trough to the next peak. During the ascending phase, cyclical upturns were typically stronger and downturns were weaker, while during the receding phase, the downturns were typically deeper and the upturns were weaker. However, Mandel did not accept the hypothesis of Nikolai Kondratiev that there existed endogenously predetermined "long cycles" in the history of capitalism. Every capitalist boom ends with a fall of the average rate of profit, but there existed no enduring economic mechanism which "automatically" created an economic recovery after a severe economic depression; much depended on state policy decisions, and on the outcome of political battles between warring social classes and class fractions (the rise and fall of mass unemployment was not simply an automatic "mechanism" of the capitalist "engine", but influenced by political factors, labour disputes and specific business conditions). Rejecting the mechanistic economic determinism of the ultra-leftist fundamentalist Marxists, Mandel preferred to characterize the long waves in capitalist development not in terms of mechanical cycles, but as "specific historical epochs" which had to be explained in their totality, with a multi-causal framework.

The political significance of the economic long waves was that they shape the life-experiences of different generations, the lessons drawn from those experiences, and the patterns of workers' struggles — nationally and globally. Political thinking from the previous era, phase or conjuncture had to be readjusted to the current and future situations. When demand for labour was high, workers were generally in a strong position, but in times of mass unemployment, workers were generally in a weaker position. Ernest Mandel sometimes referred to a "class struggle cycle" alongside the ups and downs of economic activity. In a series of publications, Mandel analyzed the dynamics and results of the unexpected postwar boom, the long world recession of 1974 to 1982, the debt crisis of developing countries, the 1987 stock crash and the long-term systemic crisis of late capitalism, as basis for his projections about the long-term prospects of world capitalism in the future.

In the tradition of the orthodox Marxists, Mandel tried to characterize the nature of the modern epoch as a whole, with reference to the main long-run laws of motion of capitalism specified by Marx. These laws of motion were:

1. The capitalist compulsion to accumulate and invest for profit, under the pressure of business competition.
2. The tendency towards constant technological revolutions, which increase productivity.
3. The constant attempt to increase absolute and relative surplus value.
4. The tendency toward increasing concentration and centralization of capital.
5. The tendency for the organic composition of capital to increase.
6. The tendency of the average profit rate on capital invested in industries to decrease, in the long term.
7. The inevitability of class struggle (or class conflicts) under capitalism.
8. The tendency of the working class to grow in size and social polarization to increase.
9. The tendency towards growing objective socialization of labour.
10. The inevitability of recurrent economic crises in capitalist society.

Mandel thought that six basic variables were most important for the long-term global growth pattern of the capitalist mode of production and its average profitability: (i) the evolution of the general and sectoral organic compositions of capital; (ii) the proportions of circulating and fixed capital in constant capital; (iii) the evolution of the rate of surplus value; (iv) the development of the rate of accumulation, and more specifically the reinvestment of surplus value in production; (v) the development of the turnover of capital (speed, volume and type); and (vi) the interactions between the producer goods sector ("Department I") and the consumer goods sector ("Department II"). These six variables could to an extent fluctuate semi-independently of each other.

=== Fredric Jameson's interpretation ===
In his book Postmodernism, or, the Cultural Logic of Late Capitalism. Fredric Jameson was partly inspired by Mandel's theory of late capitalism. Jameson's theory of postmodernity portrays a new mode of cultural production (developments in literature, film, fine art, video, social theory, etc.) which differs markedly from the preceding era of Modernism.

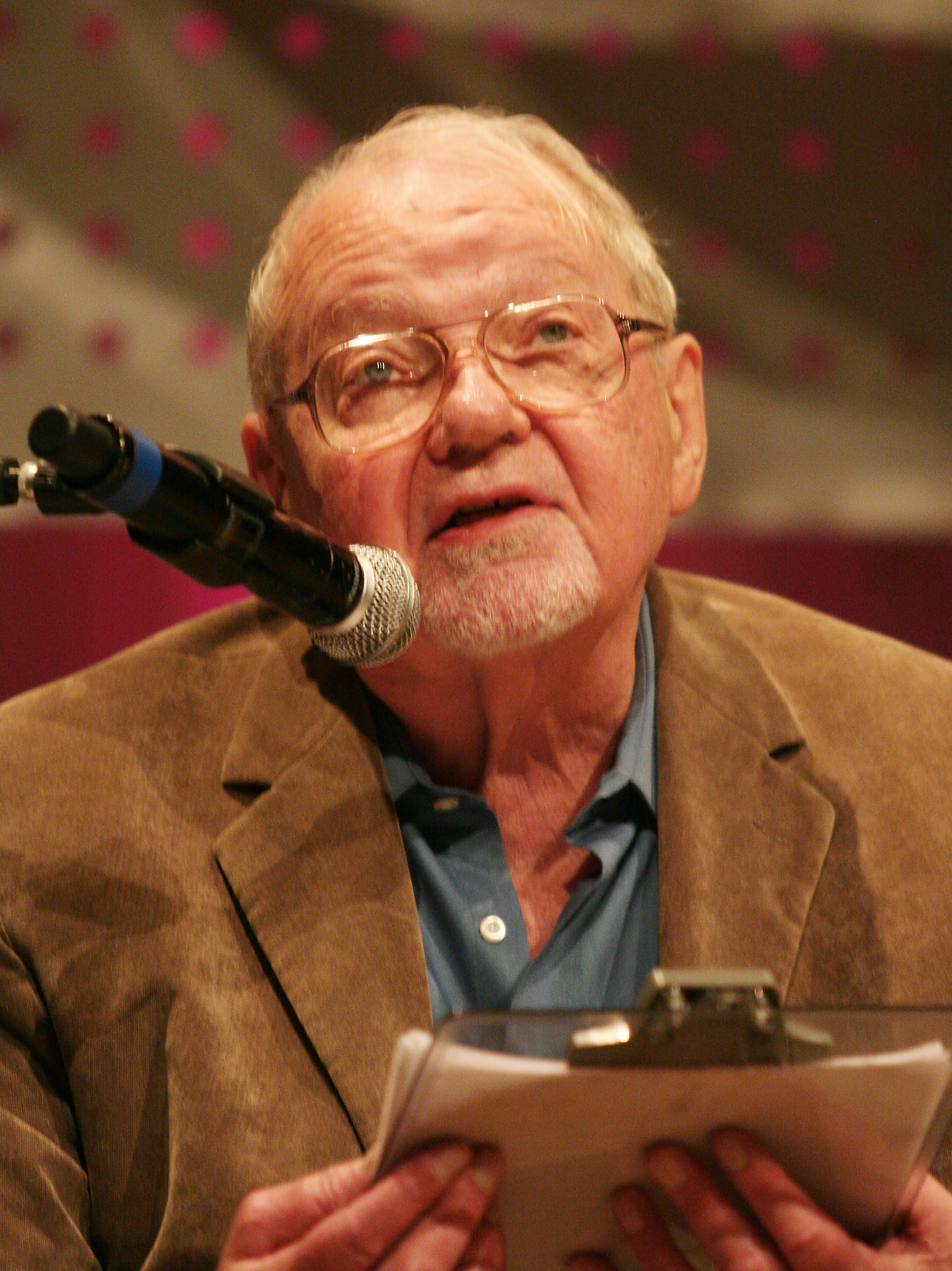
Fredric Jameson, giving a lecture at Porto Alegre in Brazil, 4 January 2004

In the modernist cultural era (c. 1900–1960s), the dominant ideology was that society could be re-engineered on the basis of objective scientific and technical knowledge, and on the basis of a broad consensus about the meaning of progress. In the second half of the 20th century, however, modernism was gradually eclipsed by postmodernist culture. Postmodernist attitudes are skeptical about social engineering and lack consensus about the meaning of human progress. In the course of rapid technological and social change, all the old certainties and traditional forms of association began to break down. This also began to destabilize every part of life, making almost everything (from relationships, foods and job positions to accommodation, fashion, household appliances and political leaderships) malleable, changeable, transient and impermanent.

Jameson argues that "every position on postmodernism today — whether apologia or stigmatization — is also...necessarily an implicitly or explicitly political stance on the nature of multinational capitalism today". A section of Jameson's analysis has been reproduced on the Marxists Internet Archive. Jameson regards the late capitalist stage as a new and previously unparalleled development with a global reach—whether defined as a multinational or informational capitalism. At the same time, late capitalism diverges from Marx's prognosis for the final stage of capitalism.

=== Corey Robin's argument ===
In a paywalled blog article published in June 2025 by New Left Review on its website, the New York political scientist Corey Robin directly commented on the issues dealt with in this Wikipedia article on late capitalism and by Francesco Boldizzoni.

He argues that late capitalism is "an ambiguous term", because it could imply "the demise of something" but also "its refinement and advance". However, he claims that "late capitalism is not an idea that lends itself to revolution or a vision of progress. It may express a wish to be rid of capitalism. But mostly it works as a theory of turning points that never turn – or worse." In Robin's view, almost all of the theorists of late capitalism got it wrong (except perhaps that some hedged their bets sufficiently to save their own argument). Robin concludes:

"More than a dictate of economics, profit is a question of power. Unlike a machine, the power of workers, concerted, cannot be determined in advance. How much power the workers can exercise – and how much profit the capitalist can extract – is an open question, answered only in the struggle itself. In the early days of late capitalism, capital learned that lesson. Whether we are in the last or merely the latest days of capitalism will be determined by whether and how labour learns it, too."

Analogous to Marcel van der Linden, Corey Robin feels that workers still have things to learn, to be able to assume their role in changing the course of history. In the Communist Manifesto, Marx and Engels commented in this sense that "The [written] history of all hitherto existing society is the history of class struggles... an uninterrupted, now hidden, now open fight, a fight that each time ended, either in a revolutionary re-constitution of society at large, or in the common ruin of the contending classes." However, Robin has nothing to say about the parasitism of late capitalism, and the role of the academic class in exploiting, discriminating and parasitizing the workers. Robin's approach to social power contrasts with Marx's interpretation of historical processes and with Mandel's parametric determinism (or "the dialectic of objective and subjective factors"). According to Marx, people do make their own history with their actions, but not in a void, not simply under self-selected social and material circumstances, but under given conditions inherited from the past. Marx reached the insight that "the educators have to be educated themselves", i.e. they have to become learners in order to understand properly what they are talking about.

== Other analyses of the epoch ==
Immanuel Wallerstein believed that capitalism was in the process of being replaced by another world system. The American literary critic and cultural theorist Frederic Jameson thought Rudolf Hilferding's term the latest stage of capitalism (jüngster Kapitalismus) perhaps more prudent and less prophetic-sounding but Jameson often used "late capitalism" in his writings. Hegel's theme of "the end of history" was rekindled by Kojève in his Introduction to the Reading of Hegel.

== See also ==
- Advanced capitalism
- Capitalist Realism
- Crisis theory
- Criticism of capitalism
- Late modernity
- Neoliberalism
- Neofeudalism
- Periodizations of capitalism
- Post-capitalism
- Postmodernity
- Post-industrial society

== Sources ==
- Hardt, Michael; Weeks, Kathi (2000). The Jameson Reader. Wiley. ISBN 978-0-631-20270-7.
