= Legitimation Crisis (book) =

1973 book by Jürgen Habermas

- Author: Jürgen Habermas
- Original title: Legitimationsprobleme im Spätkapitalismus
- Translator: Thomas McCarthy
- Language: German
- Subject: Legitimation crisis
- Publisher: Suhrkamp
- Publication date: 1973
- Publication place: West Germany
- Media type: Print
- Pages: 120
- ISBN: 0-435-82386-8

Legitimation Crisis (German: Legitimationsprobleme im Spätkapitalismus) is a 1973 book by the philosopher Jürgen Habermas. It was published in English in 1975 by Beacon Press, translated and with an introduction by Thomas McCarthy. It was originally published by Suhrkamp. The title refers to a decline in the confidence of administrative functions, institutions, or leadership: a legitimation crisis. The direct translation of its German title is Legitimation Problems in Late Capitalism. In this book, published five years after Knowledge and Human Interests, Habermas explored the fundamental crisis tendencies in the state-managed capitalism. Before the state-managed capitalism, states are primarily concerned with maintaining the market economy, while in the state-managed capitalism, states have additional roles such as providing a social healthcare, pensions, education, and so on. The expanded scopes of state administrations and influence helped managing crisis tendency of capitalism in economic field, but it created another crisis tendency in political as well as social-cultural field, which is legitimation crisis and motivation crisis, respectively.

== Habermas' Concept of Crisis ==
Habermas first clarifies what situations should be considered as a crisis of social systems. In his view, social systems possess specific organizational principles or core values that are critical to a society’s continued existence and identity. Crisis occurs when system change is so significant that it threatens these core goal values, along with the continued existence and social identity of members of society. This state is also characterized by the disruption of normative structures which leads to social disintegration.

To illustrate how such crisis happens, Habermas distinguishes three subsystems within social systems: economic systems, political-administrative systems, and socio-cultural systems. He also conceptualizes the environment surrounding around social systems: inner nature and outer nature. Outer nature is “the resources of the non-human environment,” whereas inner nature is “the organic substratum of the members of society.” Habermas views the difference between the social systems and natures is the existence of validity claims in the former. Against outer nature, instrumental actions are employed to remain social systems, and against inner nature communicative actions are utilized. The expansion of social systems toward outer (through production) and inner nature (through socialization) is also characterized by these validity claims. Through these, a social system extends its boundaries.

== Crisis Tendencies in Advanced Capitalism ==
By advanced capitalism, Habermas primarily refers to the stage of capitalism where the state intervenes in the market as functional gaps develop. This intervention marks the end of both competitive and liberal capitalism. Habermas argues that such “re-coupling the economic system to the political – which in a way repoliticizes the relations of production – creates an increased need for legitimation.” Specifically, he claims that the legitimation requirement comes down to two residual requirements. The first is civic privatism, meaning that politics does not intervene with the distribution of reward within the system. The second is the legitimation requirement to the structural depoliticization itself.

Habermas then discusses the problems occurred in advanced-capitalism with regard to the aforementioned relation between systems and natures. Namely, the system expands its boundary so far into its inner and outer nature. Vis-à-vis outer nature, the limit of environmental ability and resources to live up with economic growth and consumption. Vis-à-vis inner nature, Habermas finds a problem in the process of socialization, which “takes place within structures of linguistic intersubjectivity; it determines an organization of behavior tied to norms requiring justification and to interpretive systems that secure identity.” He assumes that motivation to conform to decision-making of public authority should require legitimation, but this process of legitimation can be occurred outside of the communicative structure of action. If this happens, “the form of socialization, and with it the identity of socio-cultural systems, would then have to change.”

Based on this observation of problems of advanced capitalism, he further argues that there are four possible crisis tendencies in advanced capitalism: economic crisis, rationality crisis, legitimation crisis, and motivation crisis. The economic system operates with the input of work and capital, and produces the output of consumable values. The economic crisis refers to the disturbances of output, meaning that the distribution of burdens and rewards is not realized within the expectation of legitimating value system. This economic crisis leads to two kinds of crisis in political system: a rationality crisis and a legitimacy crisis. A rationality crisis is the situation where the public authority cannot meet the demand from the economic system, or in his words, the situation where “the administrative system does not succeed in reconciling and fulfilling the imperatives received from the economic system.” A legitimation crisis happens when political authority fails to attract mass loyalty. These crises, in turn, creates a rationality deficit and a legitimation deficit, respectively. This means that state cannot deal with the steering imperatives of the economic system sufficiently (a rationality deficit), and that the state cannot maintain normative structures required for maintaining the identity of society (a legitimacy deficit). This also means the input disturbances for the socio-cultural system, since its input comes from the output of the economic and political systems such as such as consumable values and administrative decisions. And the output of the socio-cultural system is the foundation of the social integration since it provides the motivations to support political system in the form of legitimation. Habermas summarizes this point as follows;

“We have to reckon with cultural crisis tendencies when the normative structures change, according to their inherent logic, in such a way that the complementarity between the requirements of the state apparatus and the occupational system, on the one hand, and the interpreted needs and legitimate expectations of members of society, on the other, is disturbed. Legitimation crises result from a need for legitimation that arises from changes in the political system (even when normative structures remain unchanged) and that cannot be met by the existing supply of legitimation. Motivational crises, on the other hand, are a result of changes in the socio-cultural system itself.”

The motivation to obey the law, in Habermas’ view, comes from reason and rational justification. By arguing so, he denies the proposition that “values and norms in accordance with which motives are formed have an immanent relation to truth.” Put differently, in the course of tracing the causes and mechanism of the crisis of advanced capitalism, Habermas explored the sources of legitimacy in a more fundamental sense. To this end, he claims “the possibility of justifying normative-validity claims, that is, of providing rational grounds for their recognition.” Habermas continues to tackled this issue of validity claims and communicative action in the book The Theory of Communicative Action.

== Influence ==
Unlike the later works of Habermas, Legitimation Crisis is heavily influenced by Marx, as evident in the argument that the internal contradiction of capitalism leads to economic crisis. Yet at the same time, Habermas incorporated the system theory following Claus Offe, to respond to the weakness of Marxism as well. In the context of Critical Theory, this book has had a significant influence on later generations of critical theorists such as Andrew Arato, Seyla Benhabib, Nancy Fraser, Rahel Jaeggi, and Wendy Brown. Many contemporary critical theorists reject the strict distinction between the system and the life-world but nevertheless follows the basic tenets of Legitimation Crisis to this day.
