= State monopoly capitalism =

Marxist theory

The theory of state monopoly capitalism (also referred as stamocap) was initially a Marxist thesis popularised after World War II. Lenin had claimed in 1916 that World War I had transformed laissez-faire capitalism into monopoly capitalism, but he did not publish any extensive theory about the topic. The term refers to an environment where the state intervenes in the economy to protect larger monopolistic or oligopolistic businesses from threats. As conceived by Lenin in his pamphlet of the same name, the theory aims to describe the final historical stage of capitalism, of which he believed the Imperialism of that time to be the highest expression.

== The main thesis ==
The main Marxist–Leninist thesis is that big business, having achieved a monopoly or cartel position in most markets of importance, fuses with the government apparatus. State monopoly capitalism protected monopolistic economics from competition by smaller firms.

Lenin insists in The State and Revolution (1917) that state monopoly capitalism is not a development beyond capitalism but a manifestation of it, countering liberal and social-democratic politicians who characterised this economic development as state socialism, for example with regard to the so-named State Socialism initiatives in the German Empire.

== Versions of the theory ==
Different versions of this idea were elaborated by economists of the Communist Party of the Soviet Union (e.g., Eugen Varga), East Germany's Socialist Unity Party, the French Communist Party (e.g., Paul Boccara), the Communist Party of Great Britain (e.g., Ben Fine and Laurence Harris), and the American Communist Party of the USA (e.g., Victor Perlo).

== Political implication ==
Ever since monopoly capital took over the world, it has kept the greater part of humanity in poverty, dividing all the profits among the group of the most powerful countries. The standard of living in those countries is based on the extreme poverty of our countries.

— Che Guevara, 1965

The strategic political implication of the theory for Marxist-Leninists, towards the end of the Joseph Stalin era and afterwards, was that the labour movement should form a people's democratic alliance under the leadership of the Communist Party with the progressive middle classes and small business, against the state and big business (called "monopoly" for short). Sometimes this alliance was also called the "anti-monopoly alliance".

== Neo-Trotskyist theory ==
In neo-Trotskyist theory, however, such an alliance was rejected as being based either on a false strategy of popular fronts, or on political opportunism, said to be incompatible either with a permanent revolution or with the principle of independent working class political action.

The state in Soviet-type societies was redefined by the neo-Trotskyists as being also state-monopoly capitalist. There was no difference, in their view, between the West and the East in this regard. Consequently, some kind of anti-bureaucratic revolution was said to be required, but different Trotskyist groups quarreled about what form such a revolution would need to take, or could take.

Some Trotskyists believed the anti-bureaucratic revolution would happen spontaneously, inevitably and naturally, others believed it needed to be organised - the aim being to establish a society owned and operated by the working class. According to the neo-Trotskyists, the Communist Party could not play its leading role, because it did not represent the interests of the working class.

== Market anarchism ==
Market anarchists typically criticize neoliberal forces for inconsistent or hypocritical application of neoliberal theory regarding stamocap (State monopoly capitalism); that in those inconsistencies exist the basis of continued selective state-guaranteed privileges for the plutocratic neoliberal elite.

== Eurocommunism ==
The concept was to a large extent either modified or abandoned in the era of eurocommunism, because it came to be believed that the state apparatus could be reformed to reflect the interests of the working majority. In other words, the fusion between the state and big business postulated earlier was not so tight that it could not be undone by a mass movement from below, under the leadership of the Communist Party (or its central committee).

== Criticism ==
When Varga introduced the theory, orthodox Stalinist economists attacked it as incompatible with the doctrine that state planning was a feature only of socialism, and that "under capitalism anarchy of production reigns."

Critics of the theory (e.g., Ernest Mandel and Leo Kofler) claimed that:

- the theory wrongly implied that the state could somehow overrule inter-capitalist competition, the laws of motion of capitalism and market forces generally, supposedly cancelling out the operation of the law of value.
- the theory lacked any sophisticated account of the class basis of the state, and the real linkages between governments and elites. It postulated a monolithic structure of domination which in reality did not exist in that way.
- the theory failed to explain the rise of neo-liberal ideology in the business class, which claims precisely that an important social goal should be a reduction of the state's influence in the economy. However, neoliberalism does not oppose making states subservient to the aims of large corporations, in what is known as government-granted monopoly.
- the theory failed to show clearly what the difference was between a socialist state and a bourgeois state, except that in a socialist state, the Communist Party (or, rather, its central committee) played the leading political role. In that case, the class-content of the state itself was defined purely in terms of the policy of the ruling political party (or its central committee).

== See also ==
- Capitalism
- Capitalist mode of production
- Crony capitalism
- Government-granted monopoly
- Late capitalism
- Left-libertarianism
- Marxism
- Monopoly Capital
- Neoliberalism
- State capitalism
- Supercapitalism
- White monopoly capital
