= David R. Inglis =

David Inglis is a contemporary sociologist and academic.

== Education and career ==
Inglis earned a bachelor's degree in sociology from the University of Cambridge and then went on to complete his Master's and PhD in sociology at the University of York.

He has been a sociology professor at the University of Helsinki since 2017. He was previously a sociology professor at the University of Exeter and the University of Aberdeen.

He was a founding editor of the journal Cultural Sociology, and headed the Finnish Sociological Association, the Westermarck Society, from 2020 through 2022.

== Books ==
Inglis is the author or coauthor of books including:

- A Sociological History of Excretory Experience: Defecatory Manners and Toiletry Technologies (Edwin Mellen Press, 2001)
- Culture and Everyday Life (Routledge, 2005)
- The Uses of Sport: A Critical Study (with John Hughson and Marcus Free, Routledge, 2005)
- An Invitation to Social Theory (with Christopher Thorpe, Polity Press, 2012)

His edited volumes include:

- The Sociology of Art: Ways of Seeing (Palgrave Macmillan, 2005)
- The Globalization of Food (Berg, 2009),
- The SAGE Handbook of Cultural Sociology (SAGE, 2016)
- The Routledge International Handbook to Veils and Veiling Practices (Routledge, 2018).
- Drinks in Vogue: Exploring the Changing Worlds of Fashions and Beverages (Routledge, 2023)
