= Capitalist mode of production (disambiguation) =

Capitalist mode of production may refer to:

- Capitalist mode of production (Marxist theory), mode of production in capitalism according to Marxist theory
- Capitalism § As a mode of production

== See also ==
- Mode of production, theory of labor and other productive forces in Marxism
