= Organic crisis =

Scenario of complete instability of a system

Organic crisis, also known as structural crisis, regime crisis or hegemony crisis is a concept that defines the situation in which a social, political and economic system as a whole finds itself in a scenario of instability because its institutions have lost credibility and legitimacy before the citizenry.

It is a concept raised by Antonio Gramsci, who distinguished between simply an economic crisis and a complete crisis of the entire State:

It may be ruled out that immediate economic crises of themselves produce fundamental historic events; they can simply create a terrain more favourable to the dissemination of certain modes of thought, and certain ways of posing and resolving questions involving the entire subsequent development of national life.

— Antonio Gramsci, Prison Notebooks

In this way, he considers that an organic crisis occurs:

…either because the ruling class has failed in some major political undertaking for which it has requested, or forcibly extracted, the consent of the broad masses (war, for example), or because huge masses (especially of peasants and petit-bourgeois intellectuals) have passed suddenly from a state of political passivity to a certain activity, and put forward demands which taken together, albeit not organically formulated, add up to a revolution. A “crisis of authority” is spoken of: this is precisely the crisis of hegemony, or general crisis of the State.

— Antonio Gramsci, Prison Notebooks

An organic crisis is therefore an economic and political crisis that lasts over time and weakens the entire political regime because the ruling class and its institutions present a loss of authority and consensus among the population, even if coercive actions are taken to maintain the status quo.

== See also ==
- Base and superstructure
- Cultural hegemony
- Legitimation crisis
- Metapolitics
- Neo-feudalism
- Passive revolution
- Reserve army of labour
- Social contract
- Social order
