= Action (philosophy) =

Event done by an agent for a purpose

In philosophy, an action is something an agent does. Actions contrast with events that merely happen to someone and are typically performed for a purpose and guided by an intention. The first question in the philosophy of action is to determine how actions differ from other forms of behavior, like involuntary reflexes. According to Ludwig Wittgenstein, it involves discovering "What is left over if I subtract the fact that my arm goes up from the fact that I raise my arm". A common response to this question focuses on the agent's intentions. Thus, driving a car is an action since the agent intends to do so, but sneezing is a mere behavior since it happens independent of the agent's intention. The dominant theory of the relation between the intention and the behavior is causalism: driving the car is an action because it is caused by the agent's intention to do so. On this view, actions are distinguished from other events by their causal history. Causalist theories include Donald Davidson's account, which defines actions as bodily movements caused by intentions in the right way, and volitionalist theories, according to which volitions form a core aspect of actions. Non-causalist theories, on the other hand, often see intentions not as the action's cause but as a constituent of it.

An important distinction among actions is between non-basic actions, which are done by doing something else, and basic actions, for which this is not the case. Most philosophical discussions of actions focus on physical actions in the form of bodily movements. But many philosophers consider mental actions to be a distinct type of action that has characteristics quite different from physical actions. Deliberations and decisions are processes that often precede and lead to actions. Actions can be rational or irrational depending on the reason for which they are performed. The problem of responsibility is closely related to the philosophy of actions since people are usually held responsible by others for what they do.

== Conceptions ==
Conceptions of action try to determine what all actions have in common or what their essential features are. Causalist theories, like Donald Davidson's account or standard forms of volitionalism, hold that causal relations between the agent's mental states and the resulting behavior are essential to actions. According to Davidson, actions are bodily movements that are caused by intentions in the right way. Volitionalist theories include the notion of volitions in their account of actions. Volitions are understood as forms of summoning of means within one's power and are different from merely intending to do something later. Non-causalists, on the other hand, deny that intentions or similar states cause actions.

=== Davidson's account ===
One of the most influential accounts of intentional action is the causal theory of action, also known as the standard story of action, which was pioneered in its contemporary form by Donald Davidson (in his 1963 article "Actions, Reasons, and Causes"), who holds that actions are bodily movements that are caused by intentions. Davidson explains the intentions themselves in terms of beliefs and desires. For example, the action of flipping a light switch rests, on the one hand, on the agent's belief that this bodily movement would turn on the light and, on the other hand, on the desire to have light. Because of its reliance on psychological states and causal relations, this position is considered to be a Humean theory of action. According to Davidson, it is not just the bodily behavior that counts as the action but also the consequences that follow from it. So the movement of the finger flipping the switch is part of the action, as are the electrons moving through the wire and the light bulb turning on. Some consequences are included in the action even though the agent did not intend them to happen. It is sufficient that what the agent does "can be described under an aspect that makes it intentional". So, for example, if flipping the light switch alerts the burglar then alerting the burglar is part of the agent's actions.

Earlier, G. E. M. Anscombe, in her book Intention (1957), had developed an influential alternative account of intentional action, emphasising the agent's reasons for acting and their practical knowledge rather than treating intentional action as constituted by a causal relation between mental states and bodily movements. Although Anscombe did not deny that actions have causes, her approach differed from Davidson's causalism. She illustrated her account with the example of a person pumping water, whose action could also be described as poisoning the inhabitants of a house. The example demonstrates that a single action can fall under several descriptions, without necessarily being intentional under all of them. Independently of Davidson, David Pears developed a causal theory of action, arguing for the causal role of desires in producing actions. He presented his account in "Desires as Causes of Actions" (1968).

One difficulty with theories of action that try to characterize actions in terms of causal relations between mental states and bodily movements, so-called causalist theories, is what has been referred to as wayward causal chains. A causal chain is wayward if the intention caused its goal to realize but in a very unusual way that was not intended, e.g. because the skills of the agent are not exercised in the way planned. For example, a rock climber forms the intention to kill the climber below him by letting go of the rope. A wayward causal chain would be that, instead of opening the holding hand intentionally, the intention makes the first climber so nervous that the rope slips through his hand and thus leads to the other climber's death. Davidson addresses this issue by excluding cases of wayward causation from his account since they are not examples of intentional behavior in the strict sense. So bodily behavior only constitutes an action if it was caused by intentions in the right way.

One important objection to Davidson's theory of actions is that it does not account for the agent's role in the production of action. This role could include reflecting on what to do, choosing an alternative and then carrying it out. Another objection is that mere intentions seem to be insufficient to cause actions, that other additional elements, namely volitions or tryings, are necessary. For example, as John Searle has pointed out, there seems to be a causal gap between intending to do something and actually doing it, which needs an act of the will to be overcome.

=== Volitionalism ===
Volitionalists aim to overcome these shortcomings of Davidson's account by including the notion of volition or trying in their theory of actions. Volitions and tryings are forms of affirming something, like intentions. They can be distinguished from intentions because they are directed at executing a course of action in the here and now, in contrast to intentions, which involve future-directed plans to do something later. Some authors also distinguish volitions, as acts of the will, from tryings, as the summoning of means within one's power. But it has been argued that they can be treated as a unified notion since there is no important difference between the two for the theory of action because they play the same explanatory role. This role includes both the experiential level, involving the trying of something instead of merely intending to do so later, and the metaphysical level, in the form of mental causation bridging the gap between mental intention and bodily movement.

Volitionalism as a theory is characterized by three core theses: (1) that every bodily action is accompanied by a trying, (2) that tryings can occur without producing bodily movements and (3) that in the case of successful tryings, the trying is the cause of the bodily movement. The central idea of the notion of trying is found in the second thesis. It involves the claim that some of our tryings lead to successful actions while others arise without resulting in an action. But even in an unsuccessful case there is still something: it is different from not trying at all. For example, a paralyzed person, after having received a new treatment, may test if the treatment was successful by trying to move her legs. But trying and failing to move the legs is different from intending to do it later or merely wishing to do it: only in the former case does the patient learn that the treatment was unsuccessful. There is a sense in which tryings either take place or not, but cannot fail, unlike actions, whose success is uncertain. This line of thought has led some philosophers to suggest that the trying itself is an action: a special type of action called basic action. But this claim is problematic since it threatens to lead to a vicious regress: if something is an action because it was caused by a volition then an additional volition would have to be posited in virtue of which the first trying can be regarded as an action.

An influential criticism of the volitional explanations of actions is due to Gilbert Ryle, who argued that volitions are either active, in which case the aforementioned regress is inevitable, or they are not, in which case there would be no need to posit them as an explanatorily inert "ghost in the machine". But it has been suggested that this constitutes a false dilemma: that volitions can play an explanatory role without leading to a vicious regress. John Stuart Mill, for example, avoids this problem by holding that actions are composed of two parts: a volition and the bodily movement corresponding to it.

Volitions can also be used to explain how the agent knows about her own action. This knowledge about what one is doing or trying to do is available directly through introspection: the agent does not need to observe her behavior through sensory perception to arrive at this knowledge, unlike an external observer. The experience of agency involved in volitions can be distinguished from the experience of freedom, which involves the additional aspect of having various alternative routes of action to choose from. But volition is possible even if there are no additional alternatives.

Volitionalists usually hold that there is a causal relation between volitions and bodily movements. Critics have pointed out that this position threatens to alienate us from our bodies since it introduces a strict distinction between our agency and our body, which is not how things appear to us. One way to avoid this objection is to hold that volitions constitute bodily movements, i.e. are an aspect of them, instead of causing them. Another response able to soften this objection is to hold that volitions are not just the initial triggers of the bodily movements but that they are continuous activities guiding the bodily movements while they are occurring.

=== Non-causalism ===
Non-causalist or anti-causalist theories deny that intentions or similar states cause actions. They thereby oppose causalist theories like Davidson's account or standard forms of volitionalism. They usually agree that intentions are essential to actions. This brings with it the difficulty of accounting for the relation between intentions and actions in a non-causal way. Some suggestions have been made on this issue but this is still an open problem since none of them have gathered significant support. The teleological approach, for example, holds that this relation is to be understood not in terms of efficient causation but in terms of final "causation". One problem with this approach is that the two forms of causation do not have to be incompatible. Few theorists deny that actions are teleological in the sense of being goal-oriented. But the representation of a goal in the agent's mind may act as an efficient cause at the same time. Because of these problems, most of the arguments for non-causalism are negative: they constitute objections pointing out why causalist theories are unfeasible. Important among them are arguments from wayward causation: that behavior only constitutes an action if it was caused by an intention in the right way, not in any way. This critique focuses on difficulties causalists have faced in explicitly formulating how to distinguish between proper and wayward causation.

An important challenge to non-causalism is due to Davidson. As he points out, people usually have many different reasons for performing the same action. But when people perform it, they often perform it for one reason but not for another. For example, one reason for Abdul to go for cancer treatment is that he has prostate cancer, another is that they have his favorite newspaper in the waiting area. Abdul is aware of both of these reasons, but he performs this action only because of the former reason. Causalist theories can account for this fact through causal relation: the former but not the latter reason causes the action. The challenge to non-causalist theories is to provide a convincing non-causal explanation of this fact.

== Individuation ==
The problem of individuation concerns the question of whether two actions are identical or of how actions should be counted. For example, on April 14, 1865, John Wilkes Booth both pulled the trigger of his gun, fired a shot and killed Abraham Lincoln. On a fine-grained theory of individuation, the pulling, the firing and the killing are three distinct actions. In its most extreme form, there is one distinct action for every action type. So, for example, since "singing" and "singing loudly" are two different action types, someone who sings loudly performs at least these two distinct actions. This kind of view has the unintuitive consequence that even the most simple exercises of agency result in a vast number of actions. Theories of coarse-grained individuation of actions, on the other hand, hold that events that constitute each other or cause each other are to be counted as one action. On this view, the action of pulling the trigger is identical to the action of firing the gun and to the action of killing Lincoln. So in doing all of these things, Booth performed only one action. One intuition in favor of this view is that people often do one thing by doing another thing: a gun is shot by pulling the trigger or a light is turned on by flipping the switch. One argument against this view is that the different events may happen at different times. For example, Lincoln died of his injuries the following day, so a significant time after the shooting. This raises the question of how to explain that two events happening at different times are identical.

== Types ==
=== Basic and non-basic ===
An important distinction among actions is between basic and non-basic actions. This distinction is closely related to the problem of individuation since it also depends on the notion of doing one thing by or in virtue of doing another thing, like turning on a light by flipping a switch. In this example, the flipping of the switch is more basic than the turning-on of the light. But the turning-on of the light can itself constitute another action, like the action of alerting the burglar. It is usually held that the chain or hierarchy of actions composed this way has a fundamental level at which it stops. The action at this fundamental level is called a basic action: it is not done by doing something else. For this reason, basic actions are simple while non-basic actions are complex.

It is often assumed that bodily movements are basic actions, like the pressing of one's finger against the trigger, while the consequences of these movements, like the firing of the gun, are non-basic actions. But it seems that bodily movements are themselves constituted by other events (muscle contractions) which are themselves constituted by other events (chemical processes). However, it appears that these more basic events are not actions since they are not under our direct volitional control. One way to solve these complications is to hold that basic actions correspond to the most simple commands that can be followed. This position excludes most forms of muscle contractions and chemical processes from the list of basic actions since people usually cannot follow the corresponding commands directly. What counts as a basic action, according to this view, depends on the agent's skills. So contracting a given muscle is a basic action for an agent who has learned to do so. For something to be a basic action it is not just important what the agent can do but what the agent actually does. So raising one's right hand may only count as a basic action if it is done directly through the right hand. If the agent uses her left hand to lift the right hand then the raising of the right hand is not a basic action anymore.

A contrasting view identifies basic actions not with bodily movements but with mental volitions. One motivation for this position is that volitions are the most direct element in the chain of agency: they cannot fail, unlike bodily actions, whose success is initially uncertain. One argument against this position is that it may lead to a vicious regress if it is paired with the assumption that an earlier volition is needed in order for the first volition to constitute an action. This is why volitionists often hold that volitions cause actions or are parts of actions but are not full actions themselves.

=== Physical and mental ===
Philosophers have investigated the concept of actions mostly in regard to physical actions, which are usually understood in terms of bodily movements. It is not uncommon among philosophers to understand bodily movements as the only form of action. Some volitionists, on the other hand, claim that all actions are mental because they consist in volitions. But this position involves various problems, as explained in the corresponding section above. However, there is a middle path possible between these two extreme positions that allows for the existence of both physical and mental actions. Various mental events have been suggested as candidates for non-physical actions, like imagining, judging or remembering.

One influential account of mental action comes from Galen Strawson, who holds that mental actions consist in "triggering the delivery of content to one's field of consciousness". According to this view, the events of imagining, judging or remembering are not mental actions strictly speaking but they can be the products of mental actions. Mental actions, in the strict sense, are prefatory or catalytic: they consist in preparing the mind for these contents to arise. They foster hospitable conditions but cannot ensure that the intended contents will appear. Strawson uses the analogy of jumping off a wall, in which the jumping itself (corresponding to the triggering) is considered an action, but the falling (corresponding to the entertaining of a content) is not an action anymore since it is outside the agent's control. Candace L. Upton and Michael Brent object that this account of mental actions is not complete. Taking their lead from mental activities taking place during meditation, they argue that Strawson's account leaves out various forms of mental actions, like maintaining one's attention on an object or removing a content from consciousness.

One reason for doubting the existence of mental actions is that mental events often appear to be involuntary responses to internal or external stimuli and therefore not under our control. Another objection to the existence of mental actions is that the standard account of actions in terms of intentions seems to fail for mental actions. The problem here is that the intention to think about something already needs to include the content of the thought. So the thought is no longer needed since the intention already "thinks" the content. This leads to a vicious regress since another intention would be necessary to characterize the first intention as an action. An objection not just to mental actions but to the distinction between physical and mental actions arises from the difficulty of finding strict criteria to distinguish the two.

== Related concepts ==
=== Deliberation and decision ===
Deliberations and decisions are relevant for actions since they frequently precede the action. It is often the case that several courses of action are open to the agent. In such cases, deliberation performs the function of evaluating the different options by weighing the reasons for and against them. Deciding then is the process of picking one of these alternatives and forming an intention to perform it, thereby leading toward an action.

=== Explanation and rationality ===
Explanations can be characterized as answers to why-questions. Explanations of actions are concerned with why the agent performed the action. The most straightforward answer to this question cites the agent's desire. For example, John went to the fridge because he had a desire for ice cream. The agent's beliefs are another relevant feature for action explanation. So the desire to have ice cream does not explain that John went to the fridge unless it is paired with John's belief that there is ice cream in the fridge. The desire together with the belief is often referred to as the reason for the action. Causalist theories of action usually hold that this reason explains the action because it causes the action.

Behavior that does not have a reason is not an action since it is not intentional. Every action has a reason but not every action has a good reason. Only actions with good reasons are considered rational. For example, John's action of going to the fridge would be considered irrational if his reason for this is bad, e.g. because his belief that there is ice cream in the fridge is merely based on wishful thinking.

=== Responsibility ===
The problem of responsibility is closely related to the philosophy of actions since people usually hold others responsible for what they do. But in one sense the problem of responsibility is wider since people can be responsible not just for doing something but for failing to do something, so-called omissions. For example, a pedestrian witnessing a terrible car accident may be morally responsible for calling an ambulance and for providing help directly if possible. Additionally to what the agent did, it is also relevant what the agent could have done otherwise, i.e. what powers and capacities the agent had. The agent's intentions are also relevant for responsibility, but people can be responsible for things they did not intend. For example, a chain smoker may have a negative impact on the health of the people around him. This is a side-effect of his smoking that is not part of his intention. The smoker may still be responsible for this damage, either because he was aware of this side-effect and decided to ignore it or because he should have been aware of it, so-called negligence.

=== Perception ===
In the theory of enactivism, perception is understood to be sensorimotor in nature. That is, people carry out actions as an essential part of perceiving the world. Alva Noë states: 'We move our eyes, head and body in taking in what is around us... [we]: crane our necks, peer, squint, reach for our glasses or draw near to get a better look...'...'Perception is a mode of activity on the part of the whole animal...It cannot be represented in terms of merely passive, and internal, processes...'

=== Problem of mental causation ===
Some philosophers (e.g. Donald Davidson) have argued that the mental states the agent invokes as justifying his action are physical states that cause the action. Problems have been raised for this view because the mental states seem to be reduced to mere physical causes. Their mental properties don't seem to be doing any work. If the reasons an agent cites as justifying his action, however, are not the cause of the action, they must explain the action in some other way or be causally impotent. Those who hold the belief that mental properties are reducible to physical properties are known as token-identity reductionists. Some have disagreed with the conclusion that this reduction means the mental explanations are causally impotent while still maintaining that the reduction is possible. For example, Dretske has put forward the viewpoint of reasons as structuring causes. This viewpoint maintains that the relation, intentional properties that are created in the process of justifying one's actions are causally potent in that the process is an instance of action. When considering that actions are causally potent, Dretske claims that the process of justifying one's actions is necessarily part of the causal system. Others have objected to the belief that mental states can cause physical action without asserting that mental properties can be reduced to physical properties. Such individuals suggest that mental states are epiphenomenal, in that they have no impact on physical states, but are nonetheless distinct entities (see epiphenomenalism).

== See also ==
- Ability
- Action theory
- Direct action
- Enactivism
- Praxeology
- Social action
- Social relation
- Affectional action
- Instrumental action
- Traditional action
- Value-rational action
- Communicative action
- Dramaturgical action
- Symbolic interactionism
- Group action
- Philosophy of Spinoza
