= DPP v Santana-Bermudez =

DPP v Santa-Bermudez
- Court: High Court of Justice (Queen's Bench Division)
- Full case name: Director of Public Prosecutions v Santa-Bermudez
- Decided: 13 November 2003
- Citations: [2003] EWHC 2908 (Admin); [2003] All ER (D) 168 (Nov); [2004] Crim LR 471, DC; 168 JP 373

Case history
- Appealed from: Crown Court

Court membership
- Judges sitting: Mr Justice Maurice Kay; Mr Justice Mackay

Case opinions
- Decision by: Maurice Kay J
- Concurrence: Mackay J

Keywords
- omission

Director of Public Prosecutions v Santa-Bermudez [2003] EWHC 2908 (Admin), also known as DPP v Santana-Bermudez, is a 2003 decision of the Divisional Court of Queen's Bench Division of the High Court of Justice of England and Wales, considering an appeal by the Director of Public Prosecutions (DPP) in a criminal assault case.

The defendant, Santa-Bermudez, had lied about the presence of sharp objects in his pocket when being searched by a female police constable and the constable was injured. The defendant was charged with assault occasioning actual bodily harm but he argued that as he had not actively committed any action that led to the injury, he lacked the required actus reus for the crime to have been committed.

Although convicted at the magistrates' court, the defendant appealed to the Crown Court which found in his favour and dismissed the case. The DPP appealed to the High Court, which ruled that the defendant's willful omission, which put the constable in a dangerous situation, was sufficient actus reus for the crime to have been committed.

== Background ==
In June 2001, PC Hill was called to Stockwell tube station where she was investigating ticket touts. She found the defendant and searched him under section 1 of the Police and Criminal Evidence Act 1984. When asked if he had any sharp items on him, the defendant answered in the negative. Upon searching him, PC Hill was pricked by hypodermic needles hidden in his pockets. The defendant was arrested and was later discovered to have HIV and hepatitis C, though PC Hill was not infected.

== Crown Court ==
The defendant was charged with assault occasioning actual bodily harm (ABH) and was found guilty at Horseferry Road Magistrates' Court. He appealed this conviction to Middlesex Crown Court, which heard the appeal in December 2001. Following the prosecution's evidence being given, the defendant's counsel submitted that the defendant had committed no positive act that resulted in ABH, that omission did not amount to an assault, and on that basis, there was no case to answer. The panel agreed, allowing the appeal, and quashed the conviction.

The DPP appealed this decision to the High Court to determine whether an omission did constitute sufficient actus reus for the crime to be committed.

== High Court ==
The DPP's appeal was heard by Mr Justice Maurice Kay and Mr Justice Mackay, sitting as the Divisional Court of the Queen's Bench Division. The DPP was represented by Rachel Lawrence (daughter of former MP Sir Ivan Lawrence), instructed by the Crown Prosecution Service (CPS); she was the same prosecution barrister as had appeared in the Crown Court. The CPS indicated that they would not seek for the case to be remitted to the Crown Court for a retrial; having already been acquitted, the defendant did not appear and was not represented in the High Court.

The judges considered the DPP's submission that Fagan v Metropolitan Police Commissioner and R v Roberts showed that willful omission could be sufficient actus reus. The court also considered the case of R v Miller where it was held that recklessly failing to take action when the defendant created a dangerous situation was enough for actus reus.

Mr Justice Maurice Kay, giving the only reasoned judgment, commented that "A great deal of undesirable complexity has bedevilled our criminal law as a result of quasi theological distinctions between acts and omissions". He held that, as the defendant had recklessly given a false statement to PC Hill that put her in a dangerous situation with a foreseeable risk of harm through the omission, the Crown Court was incorrect to allow the motion to dismiss and allowed the appeal. Mr Justice Mackay agreed with the ratio decidendi.

The legal principle that an assault can be committed by an omission that was affirmed in this case, was later put into statute law through the passage of the Sexual Offences Act 2003.
