= Group action (sociology) =

Coordinated social action by a group of people

In sociology, a group action is a situation in which a number of agents take action simultaneously in order to achieve a common goal; their actions are usually coordinated.

Group action will often take place when social agents realize they are more likely to achieve their goal when acting together rather than individually. Group action differs from group behaviours, which are uncoordinated, and also from mass actions, which are more limited in place.

Group action is more likely to occur when the individuals within the group feel a sense of unity with the group, even in personally costly actions.

== See also ==
- Affectional action
- Collective action
- Collective effervescence
- Instrumental and value-rational action
- Interpersonal relationship
- Political movement
- Social movement
- Social relation
- Socionics
- Traditional action
