= History of ecstasy =

Pursuit of altered states of consciousness

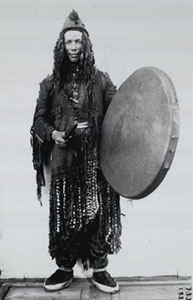
Shaman with drum

The history of ecstasy explores the global and historical pursuit of altered states of consciousness—states in which individuals seek to transcend ordinary perception and experience unity, transcendence, or transformation. Rooted in the Greek term ekstasis, meaning "to stand outside oneself", the quest for ecstasy has taken on religious, cultural, medicinal, and even political dimensions across millennia and continents.

== Origins and ancient practices ==
The search for ecstatic experience can be traced to prehistoric shamanic traditions. In Siberia, shamans engaged in drumming, chanting, and spirit journeys, often using rhythmic repetition and hallucinogenic plants to enter trance states. These practices were typically performed for communal benefit, such as healing or guidance.

Among Indigenous communities in Mesoamerica, Mazatec shamans employed psilocybin mushrooms in ceremonial rituals to communicate with spirits and obtain visions. The sacred mushroom, known locally as "niños santos," was used in healing rites and considered a vehicle for divine communication and insight. These traditions have continued into the present day, often surviving through secrecy and adaptation in the face of external pressures.

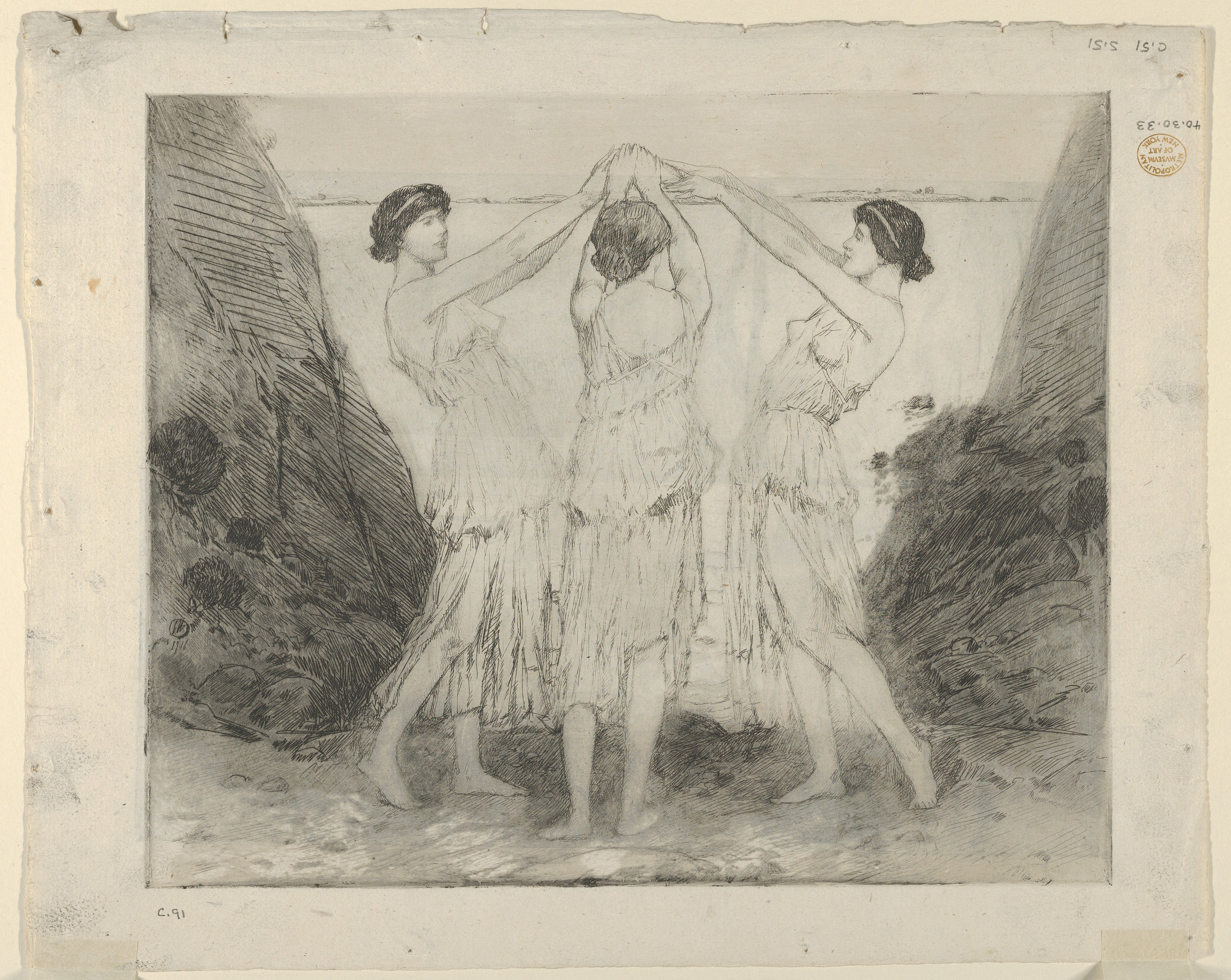
Greek dancers

In traditional Chinese shamanism, trance states were historically induced through chanting, drumming, or invocation of spirits, often within Daoist frameworks. Practitioners such as spirit mediums served as vessels for deities or ancestors, entering altered states for purposes of divination, healing, or guidance. These practices share structural parallels with other shamanic systems, including altered consciousness for communal benefit.

In Ancient Greece, mystery religions like the Eleusinian Mysteries employed ritual dance, fasting, and possibly entheogenic substances to foster collective experiences of transcendence. These rites were believed to offer spiritual rebirth and divine communion.

=== Chinese Buddhist practice ===
In the context of Chinese Buddhism, ecstatic experience is often expressed through inward absorption, particularly in the state of samadhi. One notable example is the monk Hsü-yün, who reportedly entered a prolonged meditative state in solitude. According to Road to Heaven: Encounters with Chinese Hermits by Bill Porter, after building a remote hut, Hsü-yün remained in meditation so long that fellow monks discovered he had not touched the food he prepared, which had become moldy. This suggests that in Chinese traditions, ecstatic states may be cultivated through ascetic discipline and extended withdrawal rather than communal rituals.

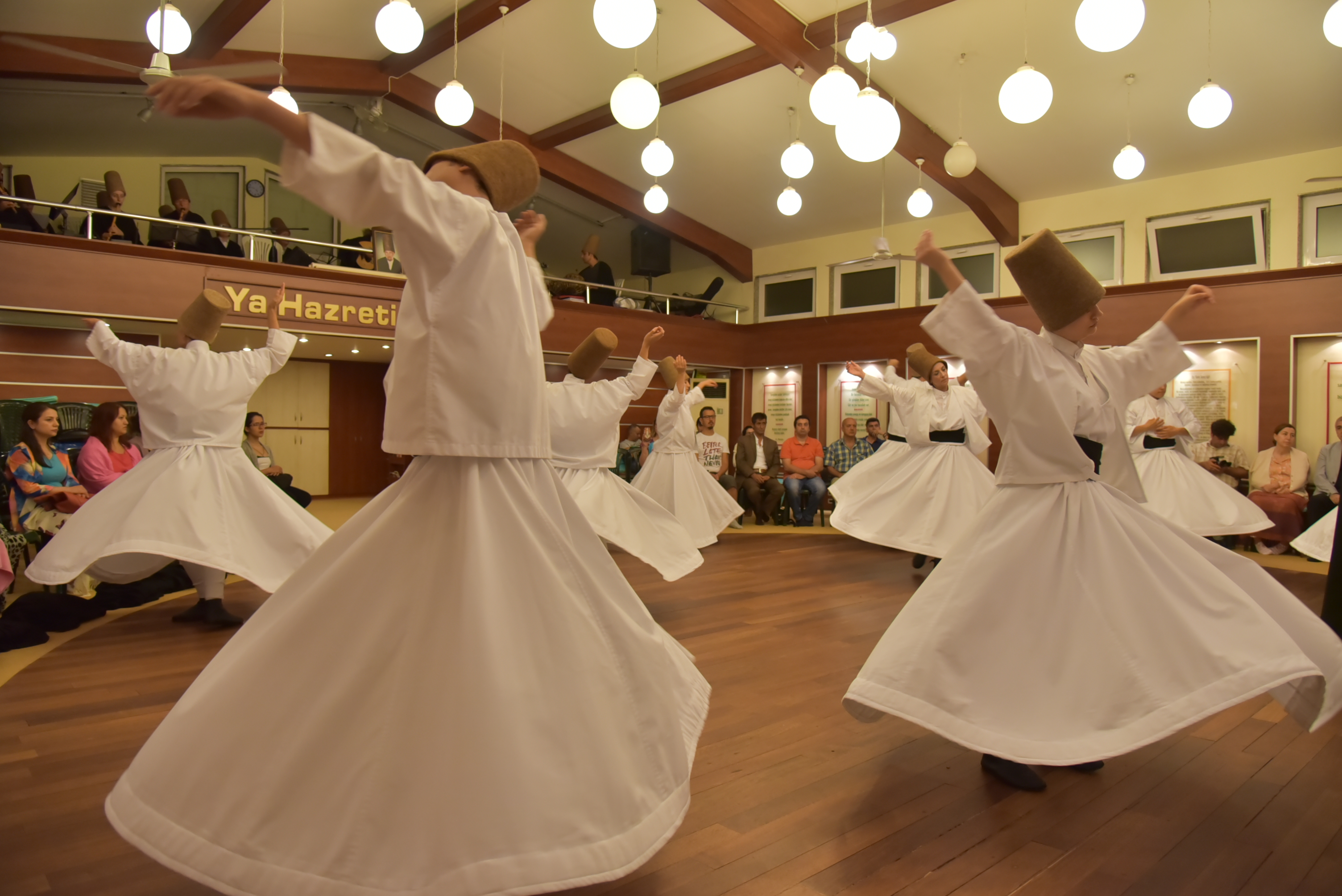
Whirling Dervish

=== Islamic mysticism ===
In the Islamic world, ecstatic experience has been central to Sufism, the mystical dimension of Islam. According to Annemarie Schimmel in Mystical Dimensions of Islam, Sufis have historically sought spiritual ecstasy (wajd) through practices such as dhikr—the repetitive invocation of God’s names—and sama, involving music and dance. These methods aim to foster divine love and union.

Such ecstatic experiences were understood as transformative, often described using metaphors of love, annihilation (fana'), and union (ittihad) with the divine. While sometimes criticized by orthodox authorities, these states were defended within Sufi communities as signs of deep spiritual realization.

Among the best-known Sufi practices is that of the Whirling Dervishes, practitioners of the Mevlevi Order who use spinning dances as a form of moving meditation. This ritual, known as the Sema ceremony, is intended to induce a trance-like state of divine presence, echoing the themes of surrender and ecstasy that characterize Sufi mysticism.

=== Collective ecstasy in antiquity ===
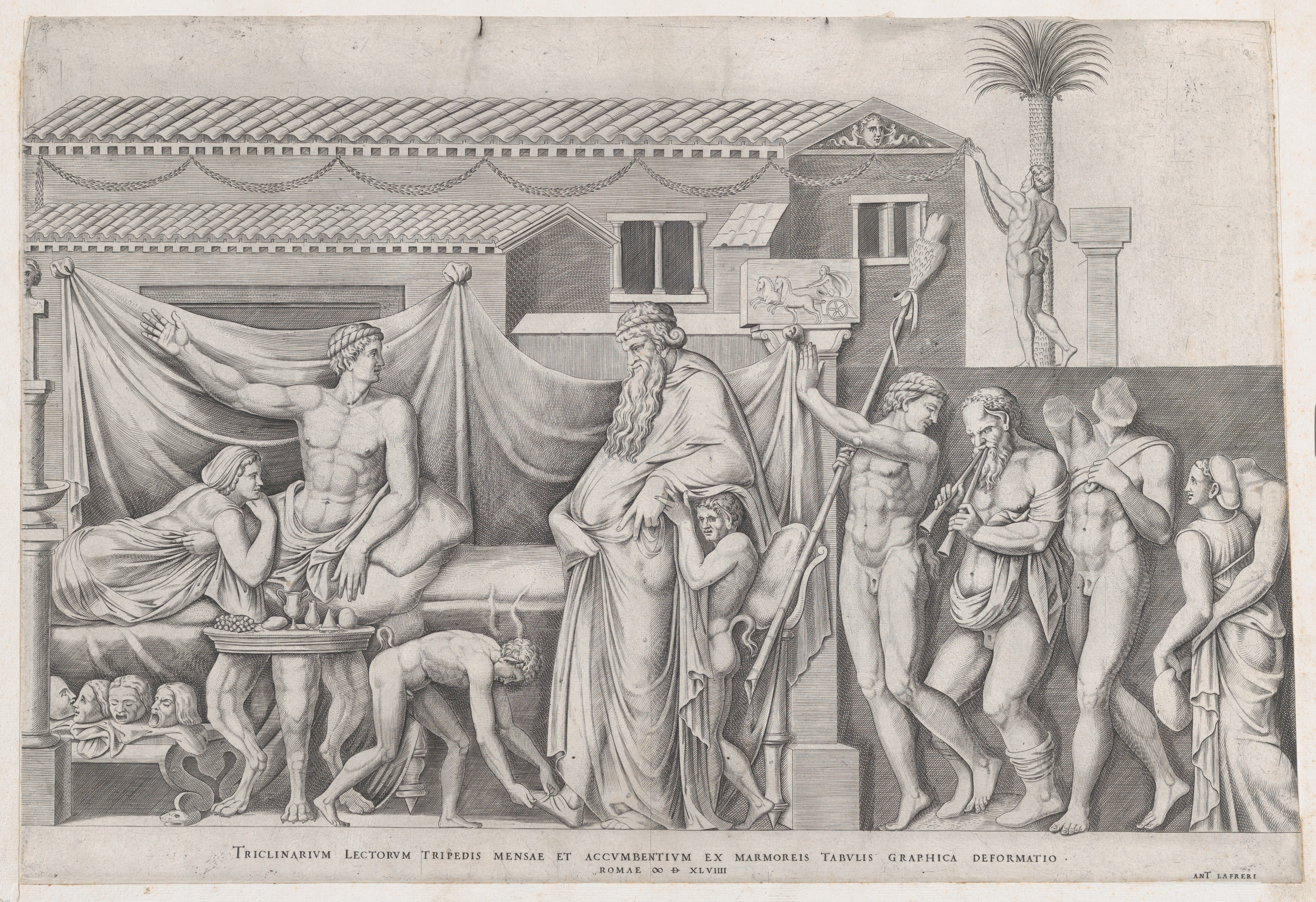
Festival of Dionysius

Barbara Ehrenreich, in Dancing in the Streets: A History of Collective Joy, explores communal ecstasy in early cultures through dance, music, and trance. Often led by women, these rituals allowed participants to transcend everyday roles and enter emotionally charged states of unity and release. Ecstatic dance was a central technique used to synchronize group energy and reinforce communal bonds

In Ancient Greece, such rites were often associated with the god Dionysus and linked to underground mystery cults. These gatherings challenged conventional hierarchies, sometimes leading to repression by state and religious authorities who viewed them as destabilizing forces.

== Ecstasy and rebellion in the twentieth century ==
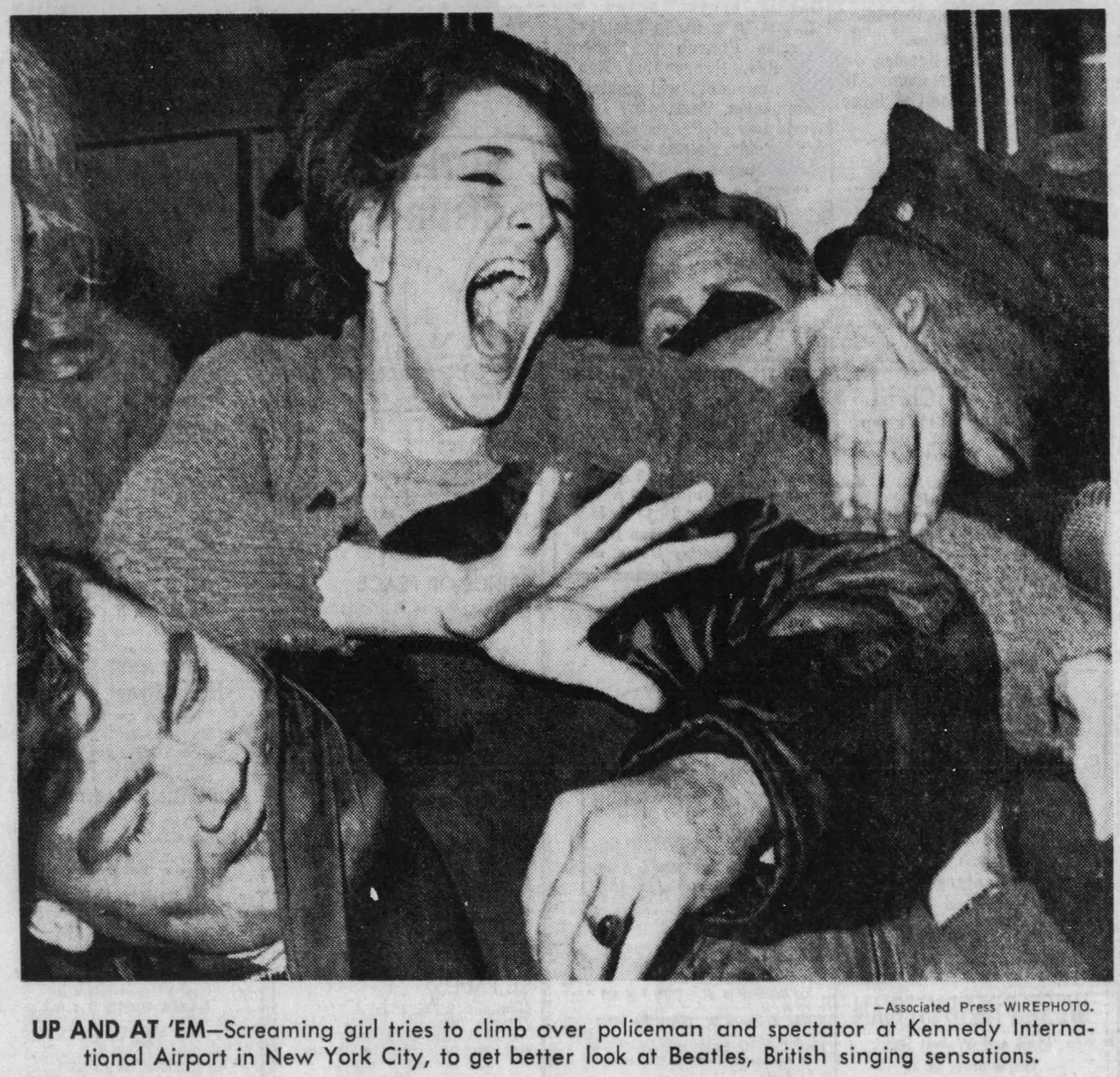
Beatlemania fan

In the twentieth century, ecstatic experiences reemerged in mass spectacles and youth culture. Barbara Ehrenreich highlighted their presence in fascist rallies and the rock music rebellion of the 1950s and 1960s. In fascist contexts such as Nazi Germany, mass rallies utilized rhythmic chanting, collective movement, and orchestrated emotion to generate a powerful sense of unity and emotional surrender to the state.

In contrast, rock and roll concerts of the mid-20th century provoked spontaneous ecstasy among youth audiences. Performances by artists like Elvis Presley and The Beatles were met with intense emotional outbursts, dancing, and screaming. Ehrenreich identified this as a resurgence of suppressed ecstatic tradition, particularly among young women, who challenged behavioral norms through participation in this collective joy.

== Psychedelics and modern ecstatic experience ==
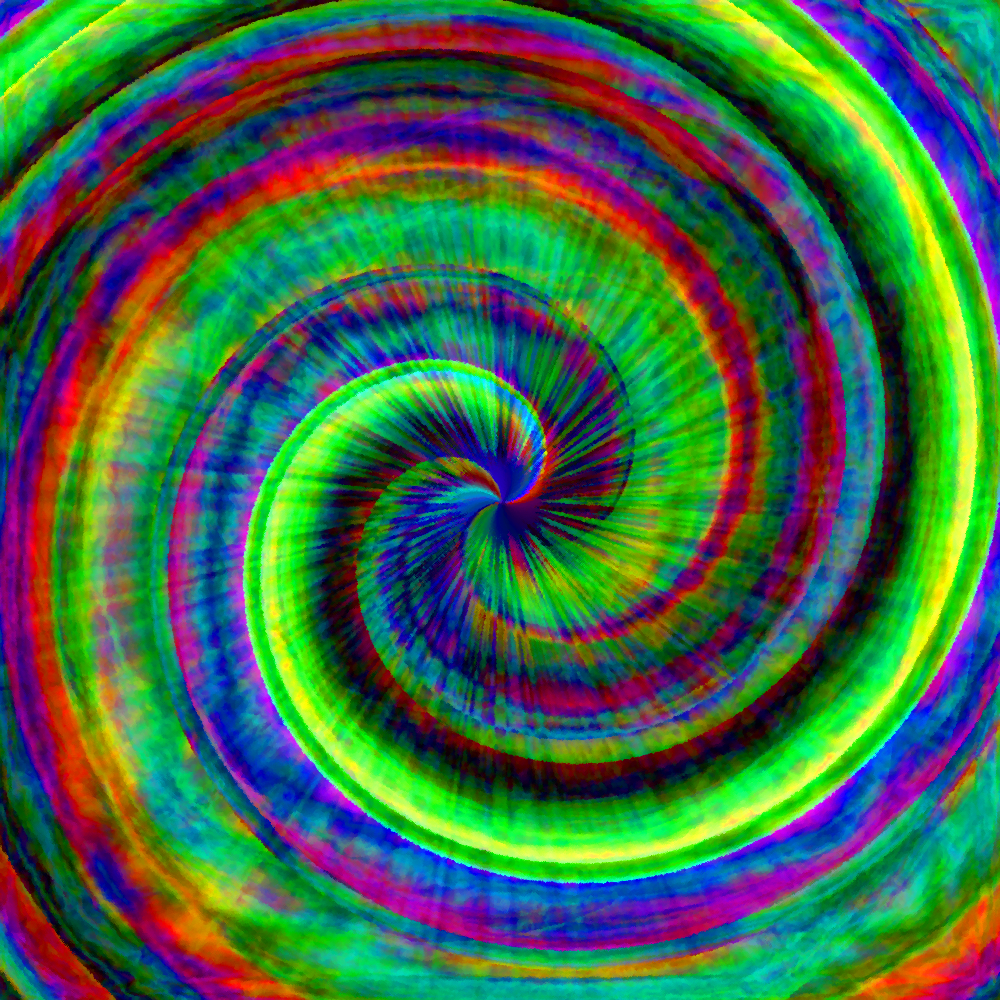

In the 20th and 21st centuries, the use of psychedelic substances such as LSD and psilocybin has been studied as a means of inducing ecstatic and mystical states. In How to Change Your Mind, Michael Pollan documents the therapeutic revival of psychedelics, highlighting their potential to trigger experiences described as "mystical," "ego-dissolving," and unitive.

Pollan notes that these states often lead to long-term psychological benefits when facilitated under guided conditions. Participants report shifts in personal meaning, reduced anxiety, and emotional clarity. Although chemically induced, these states resemble religious ecstasies and are deeply influenced by psychological factors such as intention and environment—a dynamic referred to as "set and setting" in psychedelic research.

== See also ==
- Mysticism
- Religious ecstasy
- Shamanism
- Psychedelic therapy
- Collective effervescence
- Sufism
- Transhumanism
