= Community spirit =

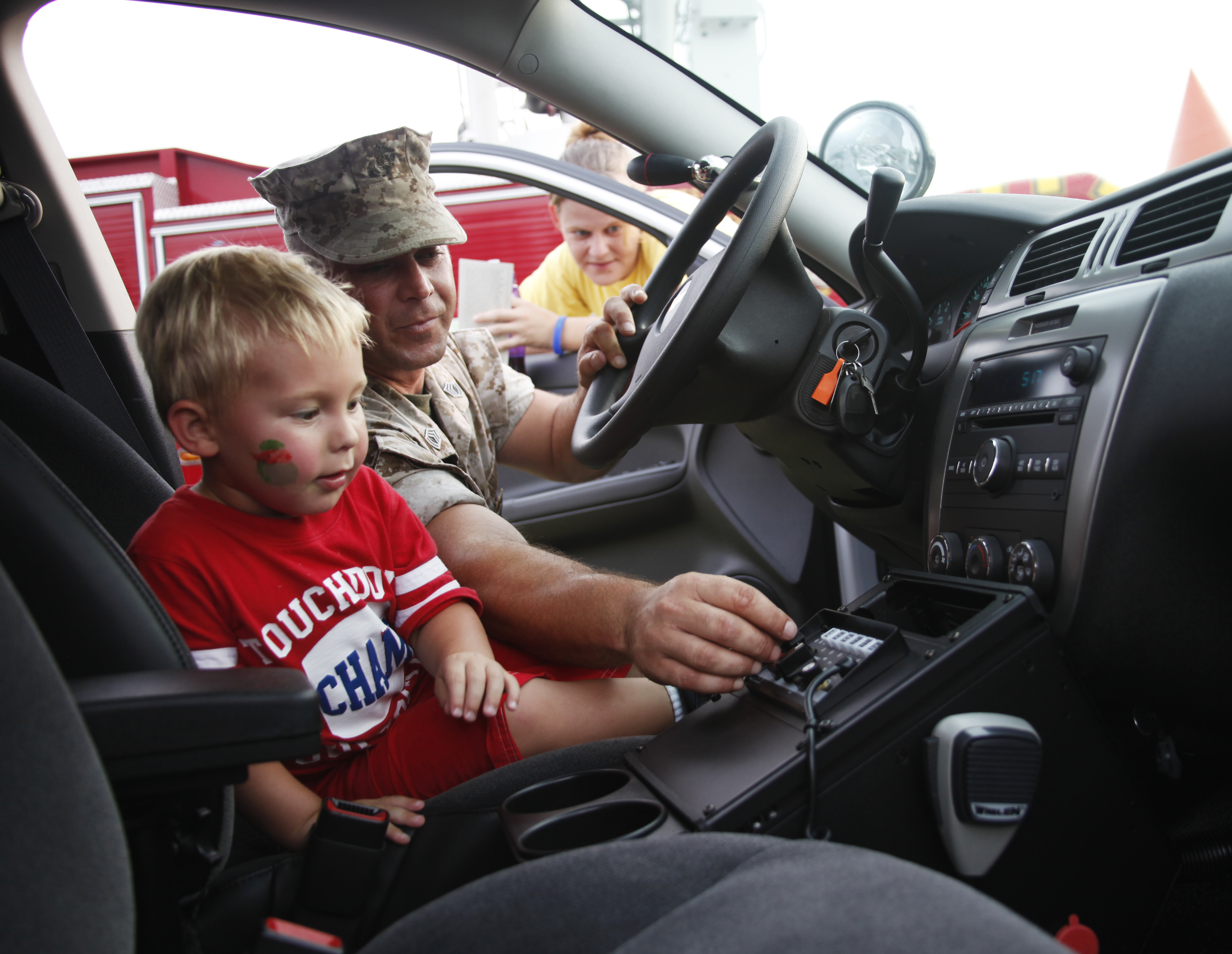
Marines and local police officers coming together to volunteer for an event which brings the community closer through civilian interactions.

Community spirit finds expression in individual or group activities in which members of a community choose to engage for the benefit of that community. These activities may be locally organised, or informal and spontaneous.

== Nature of community spirit ==
Community spirit is associated with voluntary work, favours and gestures of goodwill by residents and local businesses. A dictionary definition of "community spirit" is "willingness and desire to participate in activities that promote a community".

The measure of community spirit is subjective, but could be assessed from the achievements resulting from community activities, in addition to the level of contentment expressed by community members.

According to Durkheim, Collective effervescence indicates the intensity of group bonds through communal gatherings such as religious meetings. These bonds people create within a group ‘generate a kind of electricity that quickly transports them to an extraordinary degree of exaltation’. Meaning, when people come together in such near proximity and share the sense of group, it generates a high degree of happiness. Thus, creating a feeling of collectiveness which reinforces social bonds. This feeling is initiated when there is Group cohesiveness, for example, when individuals share the same life experience the sense of group occurs. The expression of community spirit entails a group or individual engaging in activities that benefit the community, whats bonds the group in community spirit is the goal. The group works towards the same common goal, which is to better the community by committing positive acts of voluntary work.

== Activities making for community spirit ==
Improvements to a community can be achieved by its members voluntarily working together on community projects or acting on gestures of goodwill. Examples of such contributions could include removing debris from the streets or public parks; organizing a community fair, a school fete or a charity event at a local venue; or rallying round when a community member is in need of support. Standing groups such as a neighbourhood watch or Women's Institute may also help create community spirit.

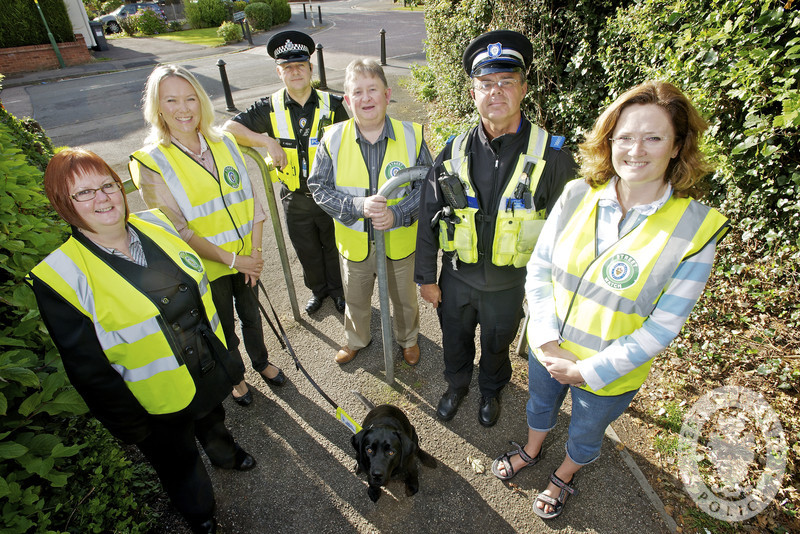
Street Watch volunteers working with police in Olton, Solihull, UK.

Community spirit is showcased through the efforts of community work. Community work is often carried out by members of a community involved in local groups, neighborhood groups or associations which engage in public service. Community work contributes to the community as a whole with acts of benefit to the public interest. According to Random House Dictionary, public interest is "1. the welfare or well-being of the general public; commonwealth. 2. appeal or relevance to the general populace: a news story of public interest."

Community spirit can also be defined as pride within a community. Community spirit can be displayed in forms of customized apparel. For example, the community logo can be placed on T-shirts, baseball caps, or bumper stickers. Communities can also display spirit by supporting local charities and schools. Community newspapers display spirit in articles relating to local volunteering, local charities, and announce a variety of community topics.

== Examples ==
=== Community Spirit Partnership ===
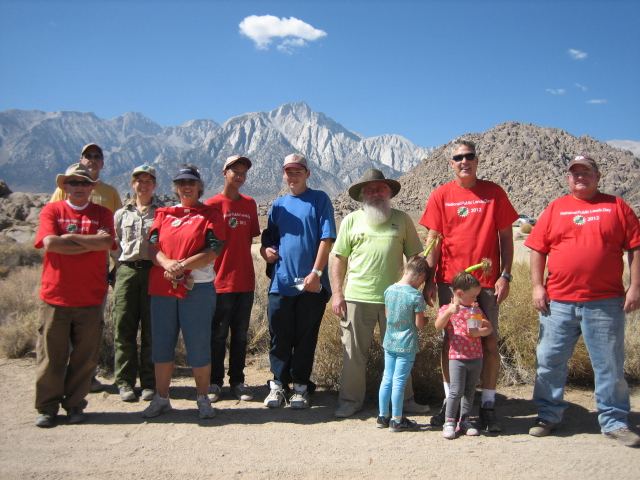
Residents wearing T-shirts to display the type of community volunteer work, thus showcasing community spirit.

In the United Kingdom, Community Spirit Partnership is a community interest company (CIC) working for community-based development. It assists parish councils, town councils and other local groups in formulating neighbourhood development plans and other community-led initiatives.

=== Miami Community Newspapers ===
Miami Community Newspapers is a local publication in Miami-Dade County, Florida. This publication distributes local newspapers in 14 communities in the region of South Florida. The community's biweekly newspaper publishes a variety of columns, including articles on education, fundraisers and multiculturalism. Community media promotes the local community's interest and showcases community news.

== See also ==
- Community
- Community service
- Institution
- Pride
  - Collective effervescence
  - Group cohesiveness
- Public interest
- School spirit
- Social movement
- Structural functionalism
