= Omission (law) =

Failure to act

In law, an omission is a failure to act, which generally attracts different legal consequences from positive conduct. In the criminal law, an omission will constitute an actus reus and give rise to liability only when the law imposes a duty to act and the defendant is in breach of that duty. In tort law, similarly, liability will be imposed for an omission only exceptionally, when it can be established that the defendant was under a duty to act or duty of care.

== Criminal law ==
In the criminal law, at common law, there was no general duty of care owed to fellow citizens. The traditional view was encapsulated in the example of watching a person drown in shallow water and making no rescue effort, where commentators borrowed the line, "Thou shalt not kill but needst not strive, officiously, to keep another alive." (Arthur Hugh Clough (1819–1861)) in support of the proposition that the failure to act does not attract criminal liability. Nevertheless, such failures might be morally indefensible and so both legislatures and the courts have imposed liability when the failure to act is sufficiently blameworthy to justify criminalisation. Some statutes therefore explicitly state that the actus reus consists of any relevant "act or omission", or use a word that may include both. Hence, the word "cause" may be both positive in the sense that the accused proactively injured the victim and negative in that the accused intentionally failed to act knowing that this failure would cause the relevant injury. In the courts, the trend has been to use objective tests to determine whether, in circumstances where there would have been no risk to the accused's health or well-being, the accused should have taken action to prevent a foreseeable injury being sustained by a particular victim or one from a class of potential victims.

So, returning to the drowning example, the accused would be liable if the victim was a child in a pool with a water depth of six inches, or there was a flotation device nearby that could easily be thrown to the victim, or the accused was carrying a mobile phone that could be used to summon help. However, the law will never penalise someone for not jumping into a raging torrent of water, i.e. the law does not require the potential saver to risk drowning even though the individual might be a lifeguard paid to patrol the given beach, river or pool. No matter what the terms of employment, an employee can never be required to do more than what is reasonable in all the circumstances. In R v Dytham (1979) QB 722 an on-duty police officer stood and watched a man beaten to death outside a nightclub. He then left without calling for assistance or summoning an ambulance. He was convicted of the common law offence of willful misconduct in public office. Widgery CJ said:

The allegation was not one of mere non-feasance, but of deliberate failure and willful neglect. This involves an element of culpability which is not restricted to corruption or dishonesty, but which must be of such a degree that the misconduct impugned is calculated to injure the public interest so as to call for condemnation and punishment.

In the Attorney General's Reference (No 3 of 2003) (2004) EWCA Crim 868 police officers arrested a man with head injuries for a breach of the peace because of his abusive and aggressive behaviour towards the hospital staff who were trying to treat him. He later stopped breathing in the police station and all attempts at resuscitation failed. Five police officers, who were involved in the care of the man at the time of his death, were charged with manslaughter by gross negligence and misconduct in a public office. It was held that the latter offence required that a public officer was acting as such, that he willfully neglected to perform his duty and/or willfully misconducted himself in a way which amounted to an abuse of the public's trust in the office holder, without reasonable excuse or justification; that whether the misconduct was of a sufficiently serious nature would depend upon the responsibilities of the office and the office holder, the importance of the public objects which they served, the nature and extent of the departure from those responsibilities and the seriousness of the consequences which might follow from the misconduct; that to establish the mens rea (Latin for "guilty mind") of the offence, it had to be proved that the office holder was aware of the duty to act or was subjectively reckless as to the existence of the duty; that the test of recklessness applied both to the question whether in particular circumstances a duty arose at all and to the conduct of the defendant if it did arise; and that the subjective test applied both to reckless indifference to the legality of the act or omission and in relation to the consequences of the act or omission.

=== Assumption of responsibility for care of dependants ===
The general rule is that parents, legal guardians, spouses (see R v Smith (1979) CLR 251 where the wife died after giving birth to a stillborn child, delivered by her husband at home) and anyone who voluntarily agrees to care for another who is dependent because of age, illness or other infirmity, may incur a duty, at least until care can be handed over to someone else. In three cases, the duty was implied:

- R v Instan (1893) 1 QB 450, Instan lived with her aunt, who was suddenly taken ill and could no longer feed herself or call for help. She was convicted of manslaughter because she neither fed her aunt, nor called for medical help, even though she continued to stay in the house and ate her aunt's food.
- R v Stone & Dobinson (1977) QB 354. Stone and his mistress agreed to care for his anorexic sister. As her condition deteriorated, she became bed-ridden but no help was summoned and she died. They were convicted of her manslaughter because they had accepted her into their home and so assumed a duty of care for her.
- R v Gibbins & Proctor (1918) 13 Cr App Rep 134. A father and his lover neglected his child by failing to feed her. The lover had taken on a duty to care for the child when moving into the house and was under an obligation to care for her.

=== Statutory omissions ===
Misprision of felony was abolished in 1967 but new statutory offences of failure to comply with a duty to disclose terrorist acts or funding under s19(2) Terrorism Act 2000, and failure to disclose knowledge or suspicion of money laundering maintain the tradition. Similarly, the appropriation element in s1 theft may be committed by an act or by keeping when there is a duty to return the property, a deception under s15(4) Theft Act 1968 may be committed by what is not said or done, and "dishonestly secures" under s2(1) Theft Act 1978 may also be committed by omission (see R v Firth (1990) CLR 326 in which the defendant failed to tell the NHS that patients using NHS facilities were in fact private patients thereby obtaining the use of the facilities without payment). One of the simpler examples is the offence of failing to report a road traffic accident (s. 170 Road Traffic Act 1988).

=== Duty to act when the defendant has created the danger ===
A person who creates a dangerous situation may be under a duty to take reasonable steps to avert that danger. In R v Miller (1983) 2 AC 161, the defendant was sleeping rough in a building. He fell asleep on his mattress while smoking a cigarette. When he woke, he found that the mattress was smouldering but, instead of calling for help, he simply moved into another room. This allowed the fire to spread. He was convicted under the Criminal Damage Act 1971 for recklessly causing damage by omission. Lord Diplock said:

...I see no rational ground for excluding from conduct capable of giving rise to criminal liability, conduct which consists of failing to take measures that lie within one's power to counteract a danger that one has oneself created, if at the time of such conduct one's state of mind is such as constitutes a necessary ingredient of the offence.

But although this may apply to the generality of offences, "constructive manslaughter" is different. R v Lowe (1973) QB 702, the defendant committed the offence of neglecting his child under s1 Children and Young Persons Act 1933, and this caused the child's death. It was held that there should be a difference between commission and omission. Mere neglect without some foresight of the possibility of harm resulting is not a ground of constructive manslaughter, even if that omission is deliberate. R v Khan & Khan (1998) CLR 830, confirmed that there is no separate category of manslaughter by omission unless the omission constitutes a breach of duty to act. The defendants supplied a 15-year-old prostitute with twice the amount of heroin likely to be taken by a regular user. The defendants left her unconscious in the flat, returning the next day to find that she had died of the overdose. Had medical assistance been called, the girl would probably not have died. The unlawful act was supplying the drug but the death was caused by the quantity injected by the victim. The trial judge invited jury to consider liability on the basis of the defendants' failure to summon medical assistance. On appeal, the conviction was quashed because the brothers had not accepted a duty to act before she took the heroin.

=== Failure to provide medical treatment ===
In general terms, doctors and hospitals have a duty to provide appropriate care for their patients, and an omission may breach that duty except where an adult patient of ordinary capacity terminates the duty by refusing consent. There is a conflict in public policy. The policy of patient autonomy enshrines a right of self-determination—patients have a right to live their lives how they wish, even if it will damage their health or lead to premature death. Society’s interest is in upholding the concept that all human life is sacred and should be preserved if at all possible. It is now well established that the right of the individual is paramount. In Re C (Adult: Refusal of Treatment) (1994) 1 WLR 290, a patient diagnosed as a chronic, paranoid schizophrenic refused to allow his gangrenous foot to be amputated. This was permitted because his general capacity showed him capable of understanding the nature, purpose and effect of the life-saving treatment. In Re B (Adult: Refusal of Medical Treatment) (2002) 2 AER 449 the presumption that an adult has full capacity can be rebutted if:

(a) the person is unable to understand the information relevant to the decision, especially as to the likely consequences of having or not having the treatment; or
(b) the patient is unable to use the information and weigh it in the balance as part of the process of arriving at a decision.

Ms B was a competent but paralysed, ventilator-dependent patient, and she won the right to have the ventilator turned off. Although the switching-off had to be performed by a doctor, and this is an act intentionally causing death, the law characterises this as an omission because it amounts simply to a cessation of the ongoing treatment. The doctors’ conduct qualifies as lawful "passive euthanasia". If the particular doctor invited to omit further treatment has conscientious objections, a doctor who will undertake the omission should be sought. But, in more general cases of necessity, urgent surgery may not be unlawful to preserve life pending any judicial decision. Similarly, when the patient is a minor, emergency treatment to preserve life will not be unlawful (note the power to refer issues of consent to the courts under their wardship jurisdiction).

In death with dignity situations where a patient is incapable of communicating his wishes, a doctor may be relieved of his duty, as the House of Lords recognised in Airedale National Health Service Trust v Bland (1993) AC 789. Here a patient who had survived for three years in a persistent vegetative state after suffering irreversible brain damage in the Hillsborough disaster continued to breathe normally, but was kept alive only by being fed through tubes. It was held that treatment could properly be withdrawn in such circumstances, because the best interests of the patient did not involve him being kept alive at all costs. Lord Goff nevertheless drew a fundamental distinction between acts and omissions in this context:

... the law draws a crucial distinction between cases in which a doctor decides not to provide, or to continue to provide, for his patient treatment or care which could or might prolong his life, and those in which he decides, for example by administering a lethal drug, actively to bring his patient's life to an end ... the former may be lawful, either because the doctor is giving effect to his patient's wishes ... or even in certain circumstances in which ... the patient is incapacitated from stating whether or not he gives his consent. But it is not lawful for a doctor to administer a drug to his patient to bring about his death, even though that course is prompted by a humanitarian desire to end his suffering, however great that suffering may be.

=== Duty to act when contracted to do so ===
In R v Pittwood (1902), the defendant was convicted of gross negligence manslaughter after he failed to close the gate on a level crossing as he was contracted to do. This caused a train to collide with a hay cart, and the court ruled that "a man might incur criminal liability from a duty arising out of contract".

=== Preventing and prosecuting war crimes ===
Following the Nuremberg Trials, international law developed the concept of command responsibility. It holds that military commanders are imposed with individual responsibility for war crimes, committed by forces under their effective command and control, they failed to prevent or adequately prosecute, if they:

either knew or, owing to the circumstances at the time, should have known that the forces were committing or about to commit such crimes.

== Tort law ==
In the law of negligence, if the defendant's conduct took the form of an omission, rather than a positive act, then it will be more difficult to establish that she owed a duty of care to the plaintiff. The rationale is that a positive duty is more onerous to fulfill than a negative duty, and therefore limits more severely the liberty of the duty-bearer.

== European Union law ==
In a case raised between the European Commission and France in 1995 following protests and violent action undertaken by French farmers interrupting the supply of Belgian tomatoes and Spanish strawberries into France, the European Court of Justice ruled that a state's failure to act can have just the same effect as state positive action:

The fact that a Member State abstains from taking action or, as the case may be, fails to adopt adequate measures to prevent obstacles to the free movement of goods that are created, in particular, by actions by private individuals on its territory aimed at products originating in other Member States is just as likely to obstruct intra-Community trade as is a positive act.

== See also ==
- Duty of care
- Duty to rescue
- Omission bias
- Sin of omission

== Literature ==
- Allen, Michael. Textbook on Criminal Law. Oxford University Press, Oxford. (2005) ISBN 0-19-927918-7.
- Ashworth, A. "The scope of criminal liability for omissions" (1989) 105 LQR 404
- Beynon, Causation, Omissions and Complicity, (1987) CLR 539.
- Finnis, Bland: Crossing the Rubicon, (1993) 109 LQR 329.
- Ormerod, David. Smith and Hogan Criminal Law, LexisNexis, London. (2005) ISBN 0-406-97730-5
- Murphy, Beneficence, Law, and Liberty: The Case of Required Rescue, (2001) Col. 89 Georgetown Law Journal, 605.
- Smith, Legal Liability and Criminal Omission, (2001) Vol 5 Buffalo Criminal Law Review, 69.
