= Social relation =

Any interpersonal relationship between two or more conspecifics between/within groups

A social relation is the fundamental unit of analysis within the social sciences, and describes any voluntary or involuntary interpersonal relationship between two or more conspecifics within and/or between groups. The group can be a language or kinship group, a social institution or organization, an economic class, a nation, or gender. Social relations are derived from human behavioral ecology, and, as an aggregate, form a coherent social structure whose constituent parts are best understood relative to each other and to the social ecosystem as a whole.

== History ==
Early inquiries into the nature of social relations featured in the work of sociologists such as Max Weber in his theory of social action, where social relationships composed of both positive (affiliative) and negative (agonistic) interactions represented opposing effects. Categorizing social interactions enables observational and other social research, such as Gemeinschaft and Gesellschaft (lit. 'community and society'), collective consciousness, etc.

Ancient works which include manuals of good practice in social relations include the text of Pseudo-Phocylides, 175–227, Josephus' polemical work Against Apion, 198–210, and the deutero-canonical Jewish Book of Sirach or Ecclesiasticus, 7:18–36.

More recent research on social behaviour has demonstrated that newborn infants tend to instinctually gravitate towards prosocial behaviour. As obligate social apes, humans are born highly altricial, and require an extended period of post-natal development for cultural transmission of social organization, language, and moral frameworks. In linguistic and anthropological frameworks, this is reflected in a culture's kinship terminology, with the default mother-child relation emerging as part of the embryological process.

== Forms of relation and interaction ==
According to Piotr Sztompka, forms of relation and interaction in sociology and anthropology may be described as follows: first and most basic are animal-like behaviors, i.e. various physical movements of the body. Then there are actions—movements with a meaning and purpose. Then there are social behaviors, or social actions, which address (directly or indirectly) other people, which solicit a response from another agent.

Next are social contacts, a pair of social actions, which form the beginning of social interactions which metadata is a big contribution.Symbols define social relationships. Without symbols, our social life would be no more sophisticated than that of animals. For example, without symbols, people would have no aunts or uncles, employers or teachers—or even brothers and sisters. In sum, symbolic interactionists analyze how social life depends on the ways people define themselves and others. They study face-to-face interaction, examining how people make sense of life and how they determine their relationships.

Sociological hierarchy
	Physical movement	Meaning	Directed towards others	Await response	Unique/rare interaction	Interactions	Accidental, not planned, but repeated interaction	Regular	Interactions described by law, custom, or tradition	A scheme of social interactions
Behavior	Yes									
Action	Yes	Maybe								
Social behavior	Yes	No	Yes							
Social action	Yes	Yes	Yes	No						
Social contact	Yes	Yes	Yes	Yes	Yes					
Social interaction	Yes	Yes	Yes	Yes	Yes	Yes				
Repeated interaction	Yes	Yes	Yes	Yes	Yes	Yes	Yes			
Regular interaction	Yes	Yes	Yes	Yes	Yes	Yes	Yes	Yes		
Regulated interaction	Yes	Yes	Yes	Yes	Yes	Yes	Yes	Yes	Yes	
Social relation	Yes	Yes	Yes	Yes	Yes	Yes	Yes	Yes	Yes	No

== See also ==
- Affectional action
- Communicative action
- Dramaturgical action
- Instrumental and value-rational action
- Interdependence
- Interpersonal relationship
- Relations of production
- Social isolation
- Social movement
- Social multiplier effect
- Social robot
- Symbolic interactionism
- Traditional action

=== Related disciplines ===
- Behavioral ecology
- Behavioral sciences
- Engaged theory
- Social ecology
- Social philosophy
- Social psychology
