= 2001 Special Honours =

British government recognitions

As part of the British honours system, Special Honours are issued at the Monarch's pleasure at any given time. The Special Honours refer to the awards made within royal prerogative, operational honours and other honours awarded outside the New Years Honours and Birthday Honours.

== Life Peer ==
=== Baronesses ===
- Professor Ilora Gillian Finlay, Vice Dean, School of Medicine, University of Wales College of Medicine.
- Professor Susan Adele Greenfield, CBE, Director, Royal Institution of Great Britain.
- Valerie Georgina Howarth, OBE, Chief Executive, Childline.
- Elspeth Rosamund Morton Howe, Lady Howe of Aberavon, CBE, lately Chairman, Broadcasting Standards Commission and Chairman, BOC Foundation for the Environment.

=== Barons ===
- Victor Olufemi Adebowale, CBE, Chief Executive, Centrepoint.
- Richard Stuart Best, OBE, Director, Joseph Rowntree Foundation.
- Amir Bhatia, OBE, Chairman and Managing Director, Casley Finance Ltd. and Forbes Campbell Ltd.
- Sir Edmund John Phillip Browne, Group Chief Executive, BP Amoco plc.
- Professor Michael Chew Koon Chan, MBE, Paediatrician and Chairman, Chinese in Britain Forum.
- Sir Paul Leslie Condon, lately Commissioner of the Metropolitan Police.
- General Sir Charles Ronald Llewelyn Guthrie, GCB, LVO, OBE, lately Chief of the Defence Staff.
- Sir David Hugh Alexander Hannay, former Diplomat.
- Professor Sir Robert McCredie May, President, Royal Society.
- Sir Claus Moser, KCB, CBE, FBA, lately Head, Government Statistical Service and Professor, Social Statistics, London School of Economics.
- Sir Herman George Ouseley, lately Executive Chairman and Chief Executive, Commission for Racial Equality.
- Sir Stewart Ross Sutherland, Vice-Chancellor, University of Edinburgh.

== Knights Bachelor ==
- The Honourable Mr. Justice (Terence Michael Elkan Barnet) Etherton.
- The Honourable Mr. Justice (Colin Crichton) Mackay.
- The Honourable Mr. Justice (Richard George Bramwell) McCombe.
- The Honourable Mr. Justice (Robert Michael) Owen.

== Most Distinguished Order of St Michael and St George ==
Order of St Michael and St George ribbon

=== Knight Grand Cross of the Order of St Michael and St George (GCMG) ===
- His Excellency Tomu Malaefone Sione, OBE, lately Governor-General of Tuvalu.

== Most Excellent Order of the British Empire ==
Ribbon bar of the Order of the British Empire (Civil)

=== Member of the Order of the British Empire (MBE) ===
Civil Division

- Peter Schmeichel – for services to football.
