= Mass action (sociology) =

Simultaneous similar behavior of many people, without coordination

Mass action in sociology refers to the situations where numerous people behave simultaneously in a similar way but individually and without coordination.

For example, at any given moment, many thousands of people are shopping - without any coordination between themselves, they are nonetheless performing the same mass action. Another, more complicated example would be one based on a work of 19th-century German sociologist Max Weber, The Protestant Ethic and the Spirit of Capitalism: Weber wrote that capitalism evolved when the Protestant ethic influenced large number of people to create their own enterprises and engage in trade and gathering of wealth. In other words, the Protestant ethic was a force behind an unplanned and uncoordinated mass action that led to the development of capitalism.

A bank run is mass action with sweeping implications. Upon hearing news of a bank's anticipated insolvency, many bank depositors may simultaneously rush down to a bank branch to withdraw their deposits.

More developed forms of mass actions are group behavior and group action.

== Epidemiology meaning ==
In epidemiological (disease) models, assuming the "law of mass action" means assuming that individuals are homogeneously mixed and every individual is about as likely to interact with every other individual. This is a common assumption in models such as the SIR model.

== Popular culture ==
This idea serves as the main plot theme in author Isaac Asimov's work, Foundation. In the early books of the series, the main character, Hari Seldon, uses the principle of mass action to foresee the imminent fall of the Galactic Empire, which encompasses the entire Milky Way, and a dark age lasting thirty thousand years before a second great empire arises. (In later books the principle is augmented with more recent developments in mathematical sociology.) With this, he hopes to reduce that dark age to only one thousand years, ostensibly by creating an Encyclopedia Galactica to retain all current knowledge.

== See also ==
- Social action
- Collective behavior
- Collective effervescence
