= Actus reus =

In criminal law, the "guilty act"

In criminal law, actus reus (/ˈæktəs ˈreɪəs/; pl.: actus rei), Latin for "guilty act", is one of the elements normally required to prove commission of a crime in common law jurisdictions, the other being Latin: mens rea ("guilty mind"). The actus reus refers to the physical action or omission required to establish liability, as opposed to the intent. In the United States, it is sometimes called the external element or the objective element of a crime.

== Etymology ==
The terms actus reus and mens rea developed in English Law are derived from a principle stated by Edward Coke, namely, actus non facit reum nisi mens sit rea, which means: "an act does not make a person guilty unless (their) mind is also guilty"; hence, the general test of guilt is one that requires proof of fault, culpability or blameworthiness both in thought and action.

== Act ==
In order for an actus reus to be committed there has to have been an act. Various common law jurisdictions define act differently but generally, an act is a "bodily movement whether voluntary or involuntary." In Robinson v. California, 370 U.S. 660 (1962), the U.S. Supreme Court ruled that a California law making it illegal to be a drug addict was unconstitutional because the mere status of being a drug addict was not an act and thus not criminal. Commentator Dennis Baker asserts:

Although lawyers find the expression actus reus convenient, it is misleading in one respect. It means not just the criminal act but all the external elements of an offence. Ordinarily, there is a criminal act, which is what makes the term actus reus generally acceptable. But there are crimes without an act, and therefore without an actus reus in the obvious meaning of that term. The expression 'conduct' is more satisfactory, because wider; it covers not only an act but an omission, and (by a stretch) a bodily position. The conduct must sometimes take place in legally relevant circumstances. The relevant circumstances might include consent in the case of rape. The act of human sexual intercourse becomes a wrongful act if it is committed in circumstances where one party does not consent and/or one or more parties concerned are below the age of consent. Other crimes require the act to produce a legally forbidden consequence. Such crimes are called result crimes. ... All that can truly be said, without exception, is that a crime requires some external state of affairs that can be categorized as criminal. What goes on inside a person's head is never enough in itself to constitute a crime, even though it might be proved by a confession that is fully believed to be genuine.

An act can consist of commission, omission or possession.

=== Omission ===
Omission involves a failure to engage in a necessary bodily movement resulting in injury. As with commission acts, omission acts can be reasoned casually using the but for approach. But for not having acted, the injury would not have occurred. The Model Penal Code specifically outlines specifications for criminal omissions:

1. the omission is expressly made sufficient by the law defining the offense, or
2. a duty to perform the omitted act is otherwise imposed by law (for example one must file a tax return).

Hence, if legislation specifically criminalizes an omission through statute, or a duty that would normally be expected was omitted and caused injury, an actus reus has occurred.

In English law, there is no Good Samaritan rule therefore one cannot be criminally liable for an omission unless a duty of care is owed. An omission can be criminal if there is a statute that requires one to act. A duty of care is imposed and one is required to act when one is: under a contract (R v Pittwood), has assumed care (R v Stone and Dobinson), has created a dangerous situation (R v Miller), or fails to perform one's official position (R v Dytham.).

=== Possession ===
Possession holds a special place in that it has been criminalized but under common law does not constitute an act. Some countries like the United States have avoided the common law conclusion in Regina v. Dugdale by legally defining possession as a voluntary act. As a voluntary act, it fulfills the requirements to establish actus reus.

== Voluntariness ==
For conduct to constitute an actus reus, it must be engaged in voluntarily. Few sources enumerate the entirety of what constitutes voluntary and involuntary conduct. Oliver Wendell Holmes, in his 1881 book The Common Law, disputed whether such a thing as an involuntary act exists: "[a] spasm is not an act. The contraction of the muscles must be willed." A few sources, such as the Model Penal Code, provide a more thorough treatment of involuntary conduct:

1. a reflex or convulsion;
2. a bodily movement during unconsciousness or sleep;
3. conduct during hypnosis or resulting from hypnotic suggestion;
4. a bodily movement that otherwise is not a product of the effort or the determination of the actor, either conscious or habitual.

=== Reflex or convulsion ===
Generally, if, during an uncontrollable flailing caused by a sudden paroxysmal episode, such as that produced by an epileptic seizure, a person strikes another, that person will not be criminally liable for the injuries sustained by the other person. However, if prior to the assault on another, the seized individual was engaging in conduct that he knew to be dangerous given a previous history of seizures, then he is culpable for any injuries resulting from the seizure. For example, in People v. Decina, 2 N.Y.2d 133 (1956), the defendant, Emil Decina, appealed a conviction under § 1053-a of the New York Penal Law. On March 14, 1955, Decina suffered a serious seizure while operating a motor vehicle. He swerved wildly through the streets and struck a group of school girls, killing four of them. On direct examination, Decina's physician testified that Decina informed him that prior to the accident "he noticed a jerking of his right hand" and recounted his extensive history of seizures, a consequence of brain damage from an automobile accident at age seven. Decina argued, among other things, that he had not engaged in criminal conduct because he did not voluntarily strike the school girls. The New York Court of Appeals disagreed and held that since the defendant knew he was susceptible to a seizure at any time without warning and decided to operate a motor vehicle on a public highway anyway, he was guilty of the offense. "To hold otherwise," wrote Froessel, J, "would be to say that a man may freely indulge himself in liquor in the same hope that it will not affect his driving, and if it later develops that ensuing intoxication causes dangerous and reckless driving resulting in death, his unconsciousness or involuntariness at that time would relieve him from prosecution[.]"

A recent study of People v. Decina concluded however, that one of the reasons for the general knowledge of this case and its continual citation was the intense national reporting that occurred regarding it and then Decina himself was discriminated against because of his epilepsy.

=== Unconsciousness or sleep ===
In Hill v Baxter, Kilmuir, LC, articulated the necessity of eliminating automatism, defined as "the existence in any person of behaviour of which he is unaware and over which he has no conscious control," in proving the voluntariness of the actus reus:

[N]ormally the presumption of mental capacity is sufficient to prove that he acted consciously and voluntarily and the prosecution need go no further. But, if after considering evidence properly left them by the judge, the jury are left in real doubt whether or not the accused acted in a state of automatism...they should acquit because the necessary mens rea—if indeed the actus reus—has not been proved beyond a reasonable doubt.

Thus, a person suffering from somnambulism, a fugue, a metabolic disorder, epilepsy, or other convulsive or reflexive disorder, who kills another, steals another's property, or engages in other facially criminal conduct, may not have committed an actus reus, for such conduct may have been elicited unconsciously, and "one who engages in what would otherwise be criminal conduct is not guilty of a crime if he does so in a state of unconsciousness[.]" Depending on jurisdiction, automatism may be a defense distinct from insanity or a species of it.

=== Hypnosis ===
While the general scientific consensus is that hypnosis cannot induce individuals to engage in conduct in which they would not otherwise engage, the Model Penal Code, as well as the criminal codes of Montana, New York, and Kentucky do provide hypnosis and hypnotic suggestion as negating volition, and consequently, actus reus.

Perhaps the earliest case of hypnotism as negating voluntary conduct is California v. Ebanks, 49 P 1049 (Cal. 1897). In Ebanks, the court categorically rejected Ebanks' argument that the trial court committed reversible err in denying him leave to present expert testimony concerning the effects of hypnotism on the will. The lower court bluntly remarked that "[t]he law of the United States does not recognize hypnotism. It would be an illegal defense, and I cannot admit it." Nearly sixty years later, however, the California Court of Appeals ruled that the trial court did not err in allowing expert testimony on hypnosis, though it did not rule on whether hypnotism negates volition. The Supreme Court of Canada ruled confessions made under hypnosis inadmissible because they are involuntarily given; Germany and Denmark provide a hypnotist defense.

=== Omission ===
Voluntariness includes omission, for implicit in omission is that the actor voluntarily chose to not perform a bodily movement and, consequently, caused an injury. The purposeful, reckless, or negligent absence of an action is considered a voluntary action and fulfills the voluntary requirement of actus reus.

== See also ==
- Common law
- Mens rea
- Rei vindicatio
