= Affectional action =

Type of social action as defined by Max Weber

An affectional action (also known as an affectual, emotional, or affective action) is one of four major types of social action, as defined by Max Weber. Unlike the other social actions, an affectional action is an action that occurs as a result of a person's state of feeling, sometimes regardless of the consequences that follow it. Because the action is a result of our state of feeling, an affectional action may sometimes be described as irrational and reactive. An example of an affectional action can be the act of a father striking their daughter because of an action that she carried out that the father saw as frustrating.

== Max Weber's writings ==
Max Weber describes the actions that we take as rarely occurring with the influence of only one of the four types of social actions. He describes the action as: "an uncontrolled reaction to some exceptional stimulus." The action taken by the individual is also described as a reaction that consists of a release as a result of emotional tension. An affectional action may not always be uncontrolled and strictly reactive, as a person may act strictly on their emotions, but the emotions of the person may take some form of rationalization, resulting in an action that is not purely affectional anymore.

== In The Managed Heart ==
The Managed Heart is a book that was written by Arlie Russell Hochschild. First published in 1979, the book speaks about the role of emotions and feelings in our society, "feeling rules", as well as the use of emotions and affectional action in the workplace. Hochschild presents the idea that actions that result from our emotions is rational, not irrational. She goes on to say that the relationship that we accept between irrationality and affectional action stems from our "cultural policy toward emotional life..."

== Emotions as described by sociologists ==
Hochschild speaks about emotions and our actions resulting from our feelings using the input from many other sociologists in The Managed Heart:

- Charles Darwin: Darwin believed that emotional gestures were biologically innate. He went on to say that the gestures that resulted from emotions and feelings were mainly universal and applied to all individuals, where some gestures like kissing and weeping were culturally specific.
- Sigmund Freud: Freud went through three major stages of his idea of emotions. First, he believed our emotions were a result of our blocked libido, presenting itself as tension and anxiety. Then, he believed emotions and emotional actions to accompany Id. And finally he came to see emotion and affectional action as "signals of impending danger (from inside or outside) and as an impetus to action."
- William James: James believed that different emotions would accompany different body states, meaning, the manipulation of our body and mind also alters our emotions and how we would react to certain situations in which we react based upon our emotional state.

== Across individuals ==
People will react differently in certain situations, so an affectional action will always depend on the person performing the action. With this in mind, an affectional action will have a variety of factors like the personality of the person, or the cultural normalities, or even the setting in which the person is in. There will never be a universal action occurring out of emotional and state of feeling. A few examples of the variables that go into how the subject reacts can be:

- Whether the person tends to be more emotional than usual
- The cultural teachings from which the person comes from
- The environment in which the person is in

An affectional action has to take into account the individual, but the affectional action must also take into account the social norms in which the situation is occurring. This can affect the action an individual will take to an extreme level, as most individuals would react differently when in extremely different situations. Take for example, a waiter in a restaurant. He may become frustrated with clients and want to shout, however, because of his job and the norms that accompany it, he is barred from his typical action. This is an example of emotional labor, an idea developed by Arlie Russell Hochschild. The idea speaks about emotional regulation carried out in order to fit the "emotional requirements of a job". Emotional labor is one of the major modifiers of the action and individual will take, regardless of their feeling state. This will often occur when an individual is dealing with clients or customers and needs to give off a professional or "good" image, often suppressing the initial affectional action they may want to take.

== See also ==
- Group action (sociology)
- Instrumental and value-rational action
- Interpersonal relationship
- Symbolic interactionism
- Traditional action
