= R v Miller =

1982 English criminal law case

- Court: House of Lords
- Full case name: Regina (Appellant) v Miller (Respondent)
- Decided: 17 March 1982
- Citations: [1982] UKHL 6; [1983] 2 AC 161; [1983] 1 All ER 978
- Transcript: transcript at BAILII
- Cases cited: R v Caldwell ([1982] A.C. 341)
- Legislation cited: Offences Against the Person Act 1861 s. 47, Criminal Appeal Act 1968 (c.19) s.33(2), Criminal Damage Act 1971 (c.48) s.1, Criminal Damage Act 1971 (c.48) s.1(1), Criminal Damage Act 1971 (c.48) s.1(2), Criminal Damage Act 1971 (c.48) s.4, Cruelty to Animals Act 1849 s.2, Indecency with Children Act 1960 (c.33), Sexual Offences (Amendment) Act 1976 (c.82) s.1, Theft Act 1978 (c.31), Theft Act 1968 (c.60) s.15, Theft Act 1968 (c.60) s.16,

Court membership
- Judges sitting: Lord Diplock; Lord Keith of Kinkel; Lord Bridge of Harwich; Lord Brandon of Oakbrook; Lord Brightman

Keywords
- Omissions; Arson; Failure to act

R v Miller (case citation: [1982] UKHL 6; [1983] 2 AC 161) is a leading English criminal law case demonstrating how actus reus can be interpreted to be not only an act, but a failure to act.

== Facts ==
James Miller, a vagrant, was squatting at 9 Grantham Road, Sparkbrook, an inner-city area in Birmingham, England, in August 1980 when he accidentally set fire to the mattress on which he was sleeping with a cigarette butt. Rather than taking action to put out the fire, he moved to a different room; the fire went on to cause extensive damage to the cost of £800. He was subsequently convicted of arson, under Sections 1 and 3 of the Criminal Damage Act 1971. Miller's defence was that there was no actus reus coinciding with mens rea. Although his reckless inattention to the fire could be said to constitute mens rea, it was not associated with the actus reus of setting the fire. Nevertheless, the defendant was convicted for recklessly causing damage by omission.

== Judgment ==
Upon appeal to the House of Lords, Lord Diplock stated:

I see no rational ground for excluding from conduct capable of giving rise to criminal liability, conduct which consists of failing to take measures that lie within one's power to counteract a danger that one has oneself created, if at the time of such conduct one's state of mind is such as constitutes a necessary ingredient of the offence.

The decision in effect established that the actus reus was in fact the set of events, starting with the time the fire was set, and ending with the reckless refusal to extinguish it, establishing the requisite mens rea and actus reus requirements.

Therefore, an omission to act may constitute actus reus. Actions can create a duty, and failure to act on such a duty can therefore be branded blameworthy. Secondly, an act and subsequent omission constitute a collective actus reus. This has been described as the principle of 'supervening fault'.

== Subsequent developments ==
The case of DPP v Santana-Bermudez examined a similar principle, in which the defendant was convicted of assault occasioning actual bodily harm under the Offences against the Person Act 1861 as a result of omitting to inform a police officer, when questioned, that he had in his pocket a sharp object (a needle).
