= R v Dytham =

English criminal law case

R v Dytham [1979] QB 722 is an English criminal law case dealing with liability for omissions. The court upheld the common law mantra that if there is a duty to act, then failure to do so is an offence.

A police officer from St. Helens, witnessed the death of a nightclubber outside Cindy's nightclub but took no action to help because, had he reported it then Dytham would have had to stay beyond the end of his shift. The defendant was convicted of the common law offence of misconduct in a public office. The court rejected the defendant's contention that this offence required malfeasance, or at least misfeasance, and did not extend to non-feasance.

The court held that as a police officer, he had a duty of care to all of society, unlike civilians, in which case, there is no duty to put oneself at harm.
