= Colin Mackay (judge) =

British judge and barrister (1943–2026)

Sir Colin Crichton Mackay (26 September 1943 – 26 March 2026) was British judge and barrister. He was a Justice of the High Court of England and Wales from 2001 until his retirement in 2013.

== Education ==
Mackay attended the boys-only boarding school Radley College, then Corpus Christi College, Oxford.

== Legal career ==
Mackay was called to the bar (Middle Temple) in 1967 and was made a bencher in 1995. Mackay became a Queen's Counsel in 1998, and was appointed a Recorder in 1992. On 24 January 2001, he was appointed a High Court judge, receiving the customary knighthood, and assigned to the Queen's Bench Division. Upon reaching the age of 70, Mackay retired from the judiciary.

In retirement, he was appointed a Surveillance Commissioner. He served in that role for a three-year term, between 1 September 2015 and 31 August 2018.

== Death ==
Mackay died from complications of dementia on 26 March 2026, at the age of 82.
