= Collective effervescence =

Sociological concept coined by Émile Durkheim

Collective effervescence is a sociological concept coined by Émile Durkheim. According to Durkheim, a community or society at times comes together and simultaneously communicates the same thought or participates in the same action. Such events cause collective effervescence, which excites individuals and serves to unify the group.

== In religion ==
Émile Durkheim's theory of religion, as presented in his 1912 volume Elementary Forms of Religious Life, is rooted in the concept of collective effervescence. Durkheim argues that the universal religious dichotomy of profane and sacred results from the lives of tribe members: most of their lives are spent performing menial tasks such as hunting and gathering, which are profane. But during the rare occasions when the entire tribe comes together, a sense of heightened energy and unity, "collective effervescence", emerges. This intense communal experience transforms certain physical objects or individuals into sacred symbols, as the energy of the gathering is projected onto them.

The force is thus associated with the totem—the symbol of the clan, mentioned by Durkheim in his study of "elementary forms" of religion in Aboriginal societies. Because it provides the tribe's name, the symbol is present during the clan's gatherings. Through its presence at these gatherings, the totem comes to represent both the scene and the strongly felt emotion, and becomes a collective representation of the group.

For Durkheim, religion is a fundamentally social phenomenon. The beliefs and practices of the sacred are a method of social organization. This explanation is detailed in Elementary Forms "Book 2/The Elementary Beliefs", chapter 7, "Origins of These Beliefs: Origin of the Idea of the Totemic Principle or Mana". According to Durkheim, "god and society are one of the same…the god of the clan…can be none other than the clan itself, but the clan transfigured and imagined in the physical form of a plant or animal that serves as a totem."

The group members experience a feeling of a loss of individuality and unity with the gods and, according to Durkheim, thus with the group.

== See also ==
- Bandwagon effect
- Crowd psychology
- Collective action
- Collective behavior
- Collective consciousness
- Collective hysteria
- Collective intelligence
- Echo chamber (media)
- Herd behavior
- Herd instinct
- Group behaviour
- Group cohesiveness
- Groupthink
- Mass action (sociology)
- Peer pressure
- Social comparison theory
