= Instrumental and value rationality =

Philosophical terms

The terms "instrumental rationality" and "value rationality" refer to two types of action identified by sociologist Max Weber.

Instrumental rationality is a type of social action where the means are rationally chosen to efficiently achieve a specific end. Value rationality is social action driven by a conscious, unconditional belief in the value of the action itself, independent of its success or consequences.

The terms were introduced by sociologist Max Weber, who observed people attaching subjective meanings to their actions. Acts people treated as conditional means he labeled "instrumentally rational." Acts people treated as unconditional ends he labeled "value-rational."

== Definitions and concepts ==
Weber defined instrumental and value rationality in Economy and Society.

Social action, like all action, may be...: (1) instrumentally rational (zweckrational), that is, determined by expectations as to the behavior of objects in the environment and of other human beings; these expectations are used as "conditions" or "means" for the attainment of the actor's own rationally pursued and calculated ends;

(2) value-rational (wertrational), that is, determined by a conscious belief in the value for its own sake of some ethical, aesthetic, religious, or other form of behavior, independently of its prospects of success; ...

... the more the value to which action is oriented is elevated to the status of an absolute value, the more "irrational" in this [instrumental] sense the corresponding action is. For the more unconditionally the actor devotes himself to this value for its own sake, ... the less he is influenced by considerations of the [conditional] consequences of his action

Weber sometimes called instrumental means "calculation of material interests" or "everyday purposive conduct." He also called value-rational ends "ideal motives enjoined by religion or magic. Weber's distinction survives as the core of modern explanations of rational social action: instrumental means are often considered value-free conditionally-efficient tools, and value-rational ends are often considered fact-free unconditionally-legitimate rules.

== Disenchantment ==
Weber observed that the distinction between instrumental and value rationality can blur. He noted a tendency for conditional means to be converted into unconditional ends. For example, a means (e.g., a ritual like a rain-dance) initially intended to be instrumentally efficient may become a value-rational end-in-itself, regardless of its effectiveness.

Weber described the rejection of supernatural rules of behavior in European societies since the Age of Enlightenment as "disenchantment." The process involves a shift from ultimate moral ends to practical conditional ends.

Wherever rational, empirical knowledge has consistently brought about the disenchantment of the world and its transformation into a causal mechanism, a definitive pressure arises against the claims of the ethical postulate that the world is a divinely ordered, ... somehow ethically meaningful cosmos.

Despite his observation of this trend, Weber argued that instrumental means are neither legitimate nor workable without value-rational ends. He suggested that even scientific inquiry depends on intrinsic value-rational beliefs.

== Culture and society ==
=== Talcott Parsons ===
Talcott Parsons used Weber's classic terms for society-wide patterns of rational action. In his 1938 work, The Structure of Social Action, he quoted Weber's definitions and integrated them into the theory he called "social harmonized action systems. He called his theoretical framework a "means-end schema" in which individuals coordinate their instrumental actions by an "efficiency-norm and their value-rational actions by a "legitimacy-norm". His prime example of instrumental action was the same as Weber's: widespread use of utilitarian means to satisfy individual ends. His prime example of value-rational action was institutionalised rituals found in all societies: culturally prescribed but eternally legitimate ends.

Rational humans pursue socially legitimate value-rational ends by using operationally efficient instrumental means.

The central fact—a fact beyond all question—is that in certain aspects and to certain degrees, ... human action is rational. That is, men adapt themselves to the conditions in which they are placed and adapt means to their ends in such a way as to approach the most efficient manner of achieving these ends.

The starting point ... is the conception of intrinsic rationality of action. This involves the fundamental elements of "ends" "means," and "conditions" of rational action and the norm of the intrinsic means-end relationship.

Parsons thus placed Weber' rational actions in a "patterned normative order" of "cultural value patterns". Rational social action seeks to maintain a culture-bound value-rational order, legitimate in itself. The system maintains itself by means of four instrumental functions: pattern maintenance, goal attainment, adaptation, and integration. Weber's instrumental and value-rational action survives in Parson's system of culturally correlated means and ends.

=== Jürgen Habermas ===
Despite coining new names, Jürgen Habermas followed Parsons in using Weber's classic kinds of rational action to explain human behavior. In his 1981 work, The Theory of Communicative Action, he sometimes called instrumental action "teleological" action or simply "work". Value-rational action appeared as "normatively regulated". In later works he distinguished the two kinds of action by motives. Instrumental action has "nonpublic and actor-relative reasons," and value-rational action "publicly defensible and actor-independent reasons".

=== John Dewey ===
John Dewey agreed with Weber's observation that people act as if they judge and act separately on instrumental means and value-rational ends. But he denied that the practice creates two separate kinds of rational behavior. When judged independently, means cannot work and ends are not legitimate.

== Political philosophy ==
=== John Rawls ===
Philosopher John Rawls utilized a distinction similar to Weber's two rationality in A Theory of Justice (1971) and Justice as Fairness (2002). Rawls did not use Weber's labels but instead referred to the rational aspects of social action as “institutions." He relabeled instrumental rationality as "the rational” to identify institutions that are effective means, and he relabeled value rationality as "the reasonable” to identify institutions considered unconditionally legitimate. Rawls' theory posits a hypothetical "original position," where individuals, stripped of personal interests and conditions, would choose intrinsically just institutions, which are worthy of voluntary obedience.

Let us assume that each person beyond a certain age and possessed of the requisite intellectual capacity develops a [value rational] sense of justice under normal circumstances. We acquire skill in judging things to be just and unjust, and in supporting these judgments by [instrumental] reasons.

=== Robert Nozick ===
Philosopher Robert Nozick engaged with Weber's distinction, most notably in his response to Rawls, Anarchy, State, and Utopia, (1974), and in his later work, "The Nature of Rationality" (1993).

In Anarchy, State, and Utopia, Nozick presented a value-rational principle of justice centered on individual rights and the entitlement to just deserts.

He argued that the utilitarian right to satisfy individual ends acts as a "moral side restraint,” prohibiting social rules that require individuals to serve the interests of others. It entitles every person to be treated as a value-rational end rather than another's means to an end.

In "The Nature of Rationality," Nozick further refined his discussion of instrumental and value rationality. Nozick was proposing to explain how principles—universal propositions connecting unconditional ends to conditional means—work instrumentally to identify conditionally-efficient-but-unconditionally-want-satisfying means. He relabeled Weber's criteria "[instrumental] rationality of decision" and "[value] rationality of belief".

He gave instrumental rationality prominence as "the means–ends connection" and "the efficient and effective achieving of goals". At the same time, he accepted the traditional proposition that instrumental rationality is incomplete because it only concerns the effective pursuit of the given goals, not the value of the goals themselves.

Something is instrumentally rational with respect to given goals, ends, desires, and utilities when it is causally effective in realizing or satisfying these. But the notion of instrumental rationality gives us no way to evaluate the rationality of these goals, ends, and desires themselves, except as instrumentally effective in achieving further goals taken as given. Even for cognitive goals such as believing the truth, we seem to have only an instrumental justification. At present we have no adequate theory of the substantive [instrumental] rationality of goals and desires,...

== Criticisms ==
=== Of capitalism ===
Philosopher Max Horkheimer argued that instrumental rationality plays a key role in the oppressive industrial culture of capitalism. His arguments are presented in "On the Critique of Instrumental Reason" and "Means and Ends."

=== Of value rationality ===
Philosopher James Gouinlock critiques Weber's two kinds of rationality in relation to John Dewey's description of human intelligence. Gouinlock and Dewey opposed the idea of rationality based on dualisms, particularly the notion that a value could be good "for its own sake."

Gouinlock criticized the modern practice of value rationality as represented by Rawls and Nozick in his introduction to volume two of Dewey's collected works, John Dewey The Later Works 1925–53 (1984). He further developed the criticism in his 1993 study, Rediscovering the Moral Life.

Gouinlock's 1984 introduction distinguished Dewey's explanation of rationality—itself sometimes labeled "instrumentalism" and identified with "pragmatism"—from two traditional schools of philosophy: rationalism and classical empiricism, which assumed divided rationality.

The rationalist supposes that knowledge is the direct intuition of essences [value rational ends]; the empiricist supposes that it is a summary of antecedently given sense data [instrumental means].

Gouinlock explained Dewey's reasons for rejecting both poles of this traditional division. He quoted from a Dewey article on pragmatism to show how Dewey replaced value rational objects, labeled by Rawls “institutions” and by Nozick “principles” with “general ideas”—an intellectual tool relating means to conditional ends serially and inter-independently.

Value [ends proposed] implies a movement from one condition to another [which] implies an ideational function. If the object [end] is to be deliberately sought, there has to be at least a rudimentary conception of [instrumental] means, some plan in accordance with which the movement towards the object will proceed.

Dewey wrote of "intelligence" rather than “rationality" because he considered reasoning to be a two-step way of thinking, not two distinct structural capacities. It involves endless linking of available means to proposed ends. Gouinlock wrote: "Realization of the good life [a contextual end for Dewey, not Nozick’s universal want satisfaction] depends … on the exercise of intelligence. Indeed, his instrumentalism ... is a theory concerning the nature of intelligent conduct."

Gouinlock criticized Rawls and Nozick for contaminating conditional instrumental reasoning by isolating value rational principles of truth and justice from experienced conditions.[9]:xxx, xxxv–vi

Dewey, of course, was the sworn foe of all forms of rationalistic and absolutistic philosophizing … just [as] these traits are reappearing in contemporary moral thought. The most conspicuous example is A Theory of Justice by Rawls. This text aspires to a rational deduction of eternally valid principles of justice. The book called forth another, Anarchy, State and Utopia by his colleague, Robert Nozick, who provided his own deduction.

Dewey's “general ideas” were not pre-known legitimate ends actors intended to achieve. They were hypothetical visions of ways of acting that might solve existing problems developmentally, restoring coordinated behavior in conditions that obstruct it. They visualize where a situation should go; what “from here to there” looks like.

In Rediscovering the Moral Life, Gouinlock again criticized Rawls and Nozick for imagining value rational principles in their heads, while ignoring facts of human nature and real-life moral conditions. He listed traditional forms of value-rationality, all of which he found incompetent to serve humans as moral compass.

Yet philosophers have typically thought of justification as an appeal to such things as a Platonic form, a rational principle, a divine command, a self-evident truth, the characterization of a rational agent, the delineation of an ultimate good [all identified by value rationality] ...

...

If the conflicts between moral positions were all reducible to cognitive claims [of what it right], then we could settle such matters by appeal to familiar [deductive] procedures. They are not reducible, so additional [inductive] considerations must be deployed.

Gouinlock's "additional considerations" ignored claims that legitimate ends work by maximizing utility. His virtues must solve problems developmentally. Instead of trying to identify eternally legitimate institutions, he searched for continuity in virtuous ways of behaving.

While there are neither axiomatic nor unexceptionable principles, there are virtues—enduring dispositions to behave in certain sorts of ways—that are appropriate to the moral condition and are defensible in just that capacity.

...

Virtues are not philosophic constructs. They are born of the [instrumental] demands and opportunities of associated life in varying environments. Courage, truthfulness, constancy, reliability, cooperativeness, adaptability, charity, sensitivity, rationality, and the like are distinguished because of their great [instrumental] efficacies in the life of a people.

We are tailoring these virtues to the moral condition, not to abstract [value-rational] reason or to moral sentiment. We look for behavior that will address our problems, not compound them. One of the keys to this aim is to think of [instrumental] dispositions suitable to beginning and sustaining moral discourse and action, not bringing indisputable finality to them. They should be effective in the processes of the moral life, not in determining an inflexible outcome to them."

By treating rationality as a criterion for judging means–ends working to produce developmental consequences, Gouinlock gave practical meaning to Dewey's instrumentally reasoning: "For the virtue of rationality I ask no more than a sincere attempt to seek the truth relevant to a given situation."

What is finally at stake ... is not the elaboration of a system of moral principles, but a way of life—a life with a certain [institutional] character and quality."

Economist Amartya Sen questioned the separation of instrumental and value rationality. In Rationality and Freedom (2002) and The Idea of Justice (2009), Sen argued that these two normative conceptions are conditional and interrelated.

... prejudices typically ride on the back of some kind of reasoning—weak and arbitrary though it might be. Indeed, even very dogmatic persons tend to have some kinds of reasons, possibly very crude ones, in support of their dogmas ... Unreason is mostly not the practice of doing without reasoning altogether, but of relying on very primitive and very defective reasoning.

In Rationality and Freedom, Sen defined rationality as a discipline "subjecting one's choices—of [instrumental] actions as well as of [value rational] objectives, values and priorities—to reasoned scrutiny".

Sen relabeled instrumental and value rationality by naming their traditional defects. Weber's value-rationality became "process-independent" reasoning, which judges intended consequences ("the goodness of outcomes") while ignoring instrumental means. Weber's instrumental rationality became "consequence-independent" theory, because its practitioners develop "right procedures” without evaluating ends. His message was that rationality requires using "both the [instrumental] 'dueness' of processes and the [value-rational] 'goodness of narrowly defined 'outcomes.'"

Sen illustrated the paradox of extreme instrumental rationality with the example of an "instrumental rationalist" who, upon seeing a man cutting off his toes with a blunt knife, advises him to use a sharper knife (the purely instrumental means) to better serve his objective (the value-rational end).

Regarding Rawls and Nozick, Sen criticized their value rational theories as being largely “consequence-independent”, correct regardless of actual consequences. He noted that "Justice as fairness" and "Entitlement theory" are "not only non-consequentialist but they also seem to leave little room for taking substantive note of consequences in modifying or qualifying the rights covered by these principles."

Sen labeled their institutional approach "transcendental institutionalism" and "arrangement-focused" analysis, prescribing fact-free patterns of coordinated behavior assumed to be instrumentally efficient without conditions.

... Rawls's (1971) "first principle" of "justice as fairness" and Nozick's (1974) "entitlement theory" ... are not only non-consequentialist, but they also seem to leave little room for taking substantive note of consequences in modifying or qualifying the rights covered by these principles.

For Rawls, there are eternally and universally just rules of fairness: "comprehensive goals,... deliberately chosen ... through an ethical examination of how one 'should' act [value-rationally]. For Nozick there are eternally and universally right rules that cover personal liberties as well as rights of holding, using, exchanging, and bequeathing legitimately owned property."

In Idea of Justice, Sen rejected the search for a theory of perfect justice in favor of a search for practical means to reduce injustice.

Arbitrary reduction of multiple and potentially conflicting [value rational] principles to one solitary survivor, guillotining all the other evaluative criteria, is not, in fact, a prerequisite for getting useful and robust conclusions on what should be done.

Sen's analysis was complex, but not his message. He concluded that both instrumental rationality and value-rationality are capable of error. Neither premises nor conclusions about means or ends are ever beyond criticism. Nothing can be taken as relevant or valid in itself. All valuations must be constantly reaffirmed in the continuity of rational inquiry. "We have to get on with the basic task of obtaining workable rules [means] that satisfy reasonable requirements [conditional ends]."

There is a strong case ... for replacing what I have been calling transcendental institutionalism—that underlies most of the mainstream approaches to justice in contemporary political philosophy, including John Rawls's theory of justice as fairness—by focusing questions of justice, first, on assessments of social realizations, that is, on what actually happens (rather than merely on the appraisal of institutions and arrangements); and second, on comparative issues of enhancement of justice (rather than trying to identify perfectly just arrangements). Gouinlock's and Sen's criticisms of Weber's dichotomy between instrumental rationality and value-rationality have had little impact on conventional inquiry. The value-rationality practiced by Rawls and Nozick continues to dominate philosophical and scientific inquiry. Confirmation came in 2018 as the British journal The Economist, founded in 1843 on the utilitarian and libertarian principle of value-rational human rights, celebrated its 175th birthday. It praised Rawls and Nozick for the very beliefs Gunlock and Sen identified as dogmatic: “those rights that are essential for humans to exercise their unique power of moral reasoning. ... Both Rawls and Nozick practised ‘ideal theory’—hypothesising about what a perfect society looks like ..."

The first [value rational principle of liberals] is freedom: that it is "not only just and wise but also profitable ... to let people do what they want." The second is the common interest: that "human society … can be an association for the welfare of all.”

== See also ==
- Categorical imperative
- Communicative rationality
- Fact–value distinction
- Instrumental and intrinsic value
- Instrumental convergence § Paperclip maximizer
- Instrumentalism
- Objectivity (philosophy)
- Rationalisation (social process)
