= Robert Petkoff =

American stage actor

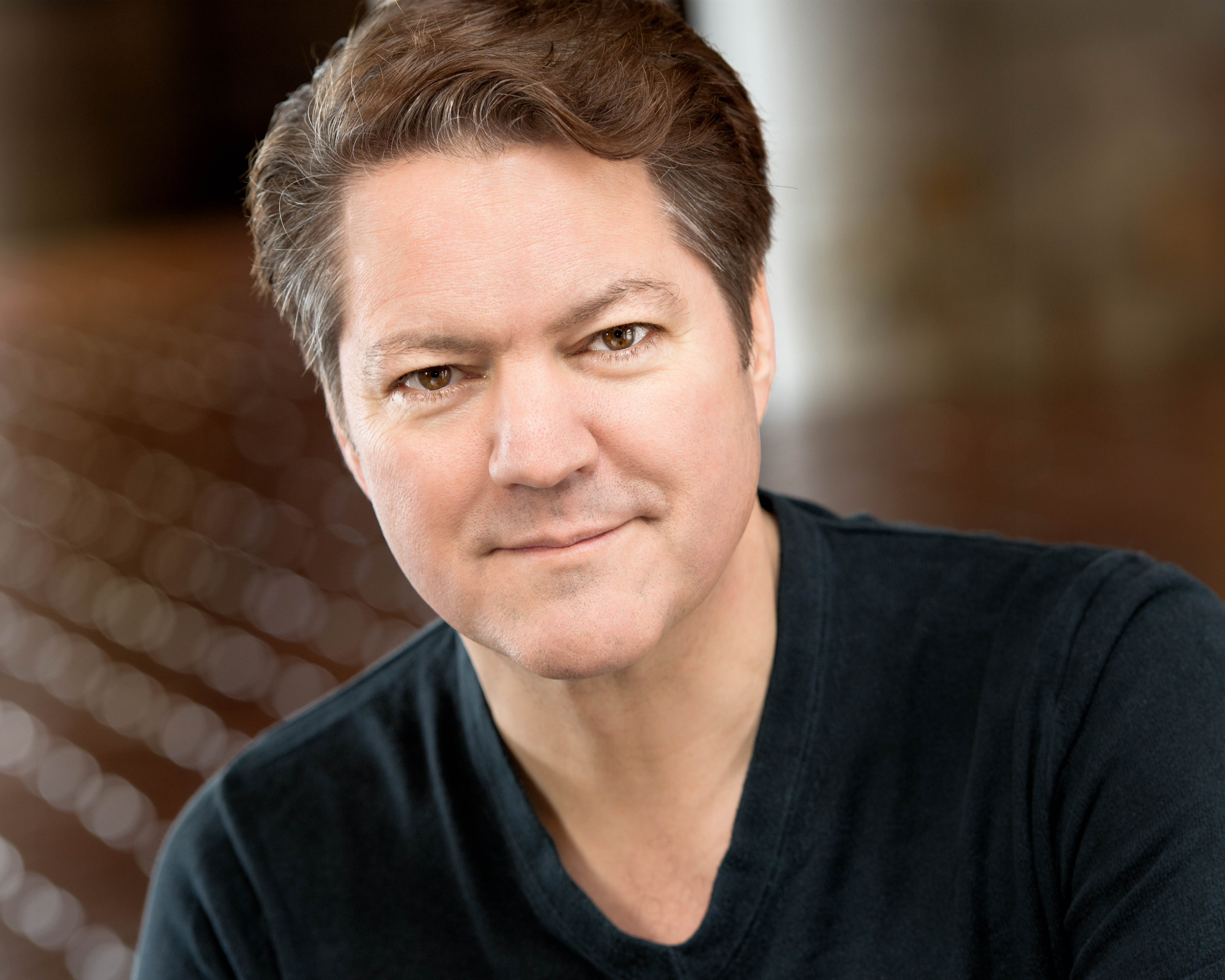
- Born: Sacramento, California, United States
- Occupations: Stage, TV and Film actor, and Audiobook Narrator
- Website: petkoff.com

Robert Petkoff is an American stage actor known for his work in Shakespearean productions and more recently on the New York City musical theater stage. Petkoff has performed on Broadway, the West End, regional theatre, and done work in film and television. Petkoff was featured as "Perchik" in the Tony award-nominated 2004 revival cast of Fiddler on the Roof but is perhaps best known for his role as "Tateh" in the 2009 revival of Ragtime on Broadway. Petkoff has also provided the voices for over two dozen audiobooks, winning awards for his reading of Michael Koryta's So Cold the River. Married to actress Susan Wands, Petkoff has lived in New York City for the last twenty years, and often performs in benefit concerts for theater-district-related charities.

== Early life and career ==
Robert Petkoff is the son of Carolyn and Peter Petkoff, the fifth of seven children, and was born in Sacramento, California. His father was an officer in the Air Force and Robert grew up living all over the United States. He graduated from Princeton High School (Illinois) and attended Illinois State University, studying theater. After finishing college, he began acting with the Illinois Shakespeare Festival, then continued his career in Chicago, working with the Oak Park Festival Theatre and Chicago Shakespeare Theater.

While in Chicago Robert was cast in the TV pilot "Mona", a spin-off from Who's The Boss?. He moved to Los Angeles and lived there for five years, where along with television work, he also worked in local theaters.

Petkoff performed in Los Angeles-area stage productions including Julius Caesar at the Mark Taper Forum directed by a young Oskar Eustis, and The School for Husbands at the Old Globe Theatre in San Diego, California. In 1993, Petkoff was cast by Michael Kahn as the Duke of Aumerle in Kahn's production of Richard II at the Shakespeare Theatre Company in Washington, D.C., performing twice more for the company in 1994.

After returning to Chicago to perform under Barbara Gaines at the Chicago Shakespeare Theater as Troilus in Troilus and Cressida and as Hamlet in Hamlet, Petkoff worked with director Mark Lamos, who cast him as Romeo in Romeo and Juliet at the Hartford Stage Company, with Calista Flockhart as Juliet.

== Stage career ==
Petkoff first appeared on Broadway in Epic Proportions starring Kristin Chenoweth, and shortly after he was cast in Sir Peter Hall's production of Tantalus, which was a co-production of The Denver Center for The Performing Arts and the Royal Shakespeare Company. The production opened in Denver and then toured in the UK, with a final performance at the Barbican Theatre in London. The production of Tantalus was the subject of a TV documentary, which examined the turbulent collaboration with John Barton and Sir Peter Hall.

Petkoff would go on to work with Sir Peter Hall in two other productions: as Perry Stewart in The Royal Family (play) with Judi Dench, Toby Stevens and Emily Blunt in London's Theatre Royal Haymarket, and as Algernon in The Importance of Being Earnest with Lynn Redgrave in a national tour.

Petkoff's first professional musical role was with the Chicago Shakespeare Theater, when he starred as George in Sunday in the Park with George, directed by Gary Griffin in 2002. Although not trained as a musical theater singer, he had been trained as a stage actor at Illinois State University, this was the first of his musical theater roles. Petkoff's first Broadway musical was as Perchik in the Broadway revival of Fiddler on the Roof starring Alfred Molina and Harvey Fierstein.

Petkoff was cast as Sir Robin in the National Tour of Spamalot in 2007 replacing David Turner in the role. After a year on tour, he was invited to join the Broadway company and in 2008 replaced Martin Moran in the role until Clay Aiken took over. Petkoff reclaimed the role again after Clay's first departure.

Petkoff returned to Broadway in Ragtime, as Tateh, in the 2009 revival directed by Marcia Milgrom Dodge, which opened at the Neil Simon Theater in November 2009 and closed January 10, 2010. The revival was nominated for seven 2010 Tony Awards, including Best Musical Revival; and was also nominated for nine 2010 Drama Desk Awards, including Outstanding Revival of a Musical.

Pekoff performed the role of Buddy in Follies, with the Chicago Shakespeare Festival, directed by Gary Griffin in October 2011.

In 2012, Petkoff starred in the Roundabout Theatre production of Anything Goes, as Lord Evelyn Oakleigh, love interest for Reno Sweeney, played by Stephanie J. Block, at the Stephen Sondheim Theatre.

In 2014, he starred on Broadway as Hubert Humphrey in All the Way opposite Bryan Cranston as LBJ.

In 2015, Robert appeared as Richard Hanny in 39 Steps at the Union Square Theater in New York City. He then went on to play the title role in Sweeney Todd at the Denver Center for the Performing Arts.

At the end of 2016 and throughout 2017, Robert played the role of Bruce Bechdel in the first national tour of the Tony award-winning musical Fun Home.

== Musical theater ==
Petkoff's first musical was with the Chicago Shakespeare Theater, when he starred as George in Sunday in the Park with George, directed by Gary Griffin in 2002.

Petkoff's first appearance on Broadway in a musical was as Perchik in the 2004 production of Fiddler on the Roof, starring Alfred Molina. Directed by David Leveaux, the revival was nominated for the 2004 Tony Award for Best Revival of a Musical and the Drama Desk Award for Outstanding Revival of a Musical.

In 2007, he joined the national tour of Spamalot as Sir Robin for a year, and then played the role on Broadway, replacing Martin Moran in the role before Clay Aiken took over and then returned when Clay departed.

In 2009, Petkoff appeared in Happiness at Lincoln Center Theater, directed by Susan Stroman, playing the part of Neil.

Petkoff has also worked with several musical theater workshops, including a reading of new musical version of Enchanted April in the role of Mr. Briggs in March 2010.

Petkoff also appeared as Guy Fawkes in the New York Stage & Film's Powerhouse Theater production of Bonfire Night, directed by Alex Timbers.

Petkoff appeared in the Like Water for Chocolate musical workshop with Tony Award winner Chita Rivera at the Sundance Institute's 2011 Theatre Lab in Alberta, Canada, in April 2011. In addition to Chita Rivera (Kiss of the Spider Woman, Chicago, The Rink), and Robert Petkoff (Ragtime, Spamalot, Fiddler on the Roof), the cast included Nicholas Rodriguez (Tarzan, One Life to Live).

== Selected works ==
=== Recordings ===
Date	Title	Author	Type	Publisher
2004-06-08	Fiddler on the Roof	Jerry Bock; Sheldon Harnick	Cast recording	PS Classics
2008-10-14	Lincoln: A Photobiography	Russell Freedman	Audiobook	Listening Library
2009-01-07	Beat the Reaper	Josh Bazell	Audiobook	Hachette Audio
2009-04-14	BoneMan's Daughters	Ted Dekker	Audiobook	Hachette Audio
2009-05-06	The Link: Uncovering Our Earliest Ancestor	Colin Tudge	Audiobook	Hachette Audio
2009-08-10	Michael Jackson: The Final Years	J. Randy Taraborrelli	Audiobook	Hachette Audio
2009-08-25	The Secret Life of Marilyn Monroe	J. Randy Taraborrelli	Audiobook	Hachette Audio
2009-09-01	This Book Is Not Good for You	Pseudonymous Bosch	Audiobook	Hachette Audio
2010-05-06	Westward the Tide	Louis L'Amour	Audiobook	Random House Audio
2010-05-26	So Cold the River	Michael Koryta	Audiobook	Hachette Audio
2010-06-01	The Broom of the System	David Foster Wallace	Audiobook	Hachette Audio
2010-06-01	Pleading Guilty	Scott Turow	Audiobook	Hachette Audio
2010-09-03	Room	Emma Donoghue	Audiobook	Pan Macmillan
2010-09-21	This Isn't What It Looks Like	Pseudonymous Bosch	Audiobook	Hachette Audio
2010-12-03	Girl with Curious Hair	David Foster Wallace	Audiobook	Hachette Audio
2011-01-24	The Cypress House	Michael Koryta	Audiobook	Hachette Audio
2011-02-02	The Evolution of Bruno Littlemore	Benjamin Hale	Audiobook	Hachette Audio
2011-02-15	A Heartbeat Away	Michael Palmer	Audiobook	Macmillan Audio
2009-07-15	Ravens	George Dawes Green	Audiobook	Hachette Audio (re-release)
2011-03-29	The School of Night	Louis Bayard	Audiobook	Macmillan Audio
2010-04-15	The Pale King	David Foster Wallace	Audiobook	Hachette Audio
2011-04-19	Go, Mutants!	Larry Doyle	Audiobook	Harper Audio
2011-06-08	The Ridge	Michael Koryta	Audiobook	Hachette Audio
2011-10-11	A Hunger Like No Other: Immortals After Dark, Book 2	Kresley Cole	Audiobook	Simon and Schuster Audio
2012-01-10	Lothaire: Immortals After Dark, Book 12	Kresley Cole	Audiobook	Simon and Schuster Audio
2012-03-20	No Rest For The Wicked: Immortals After, Dark Book 3	Kresley Cole	Audiobook	Simon and Schuster Audio
2012-06-05	Wicked Deeds On A Winter's Nigh: Immortal's After Dark, Book 4	Kresley Cole	Audiobook	Simon and Schuster Audio
2012-11-01	Dark Needs At Night's Edge: Immortals After Dark, Book 5	Kresley Cole	Audiobook	Simon and Schuster Audio
2012-11-27	Shadow's Claim: Immortals After Dark, Book 13: The Declans Book 13	Kresley Cole	Audiobook	Simon and Schuster Audio
2013-02-05	Dark Desires After Dusk: Immortals After Dark, Book 6	Kresley Cole	Audiobook	Simon and Schuster Audio
2013-05-07	Kiss Of The Demon King: Immortals After Dark, Book 7	Kresley Cole	Audiobook	Simon and Schuster Audio
2013-07-02	Macrieve: Immortals After Dark, Book 14	Kresley Cole	Audiobook	Simon and Schuster Audio
2013-09-13	Untouchable: Immortals After Dark, Book 8	Kresley Cole	Audiobook	Simon and Schuster Audio
2013-12-03	Pleasure Of A Dark Prince: Immortals After Dark, Book 9	Kresley Cole	Audiobook	Simon and Schuster Audio
2014-03-04	Demon From The Dark: Immortals After Dark, Book 10	Kresley Cole	Audiobook	Simon and Schuster Audio
2014-05-06	Dreams Of A Dark Warrior: Immortals After Dark, Book 11	Kresley Cole	Audiobook	Simon and Schuster Audio
2014-08-06	Dark Skye: Immortals After Dark, Book 15	Kresley Cole	Audiobook	Simon and Schuster Audio
2015-06-01	Those Who Wish Me Dead	Michael Koryta	Audiobook	Hachette Audio
2017-01-31	Headlong Flight - Star Trek: The Next Generation	Dayton Ward	Audiobook	Simon and Schuster Audio
2017-08-29	Bernie Sanders Guide to Political Revolution	Bernie Sanders	Audiobook	Macmillan Audio
2018-06-05	Star Trek: Discovery: Fear Itself	James Swallow	Audiobook	Simon and Schuster Audio
2018-09-11	Fear: Trump in the White House	Bob Woodward	Audiobook	Simon and Schuster Audio
2020-11-02	Star Trek: Picard: The Last Best Hope	Una McCormack	Audiobook	Simon and Schuster Audio
2020-06-23	The Room Where It Happened: A White House Memoir	John Bolton	Audiobook	Simon and Schuster Audio
2020-09-08	Disloyal: A Memoir	Michael Cohen	Audiobook	Skyhorse Publishing
2020-09-15	Rage (Woodward book)	Bob Woodward	Audiobook	Simon and Schuster Audio
2021-09-21	Peril (book)	Bob Woodward and Robert Costa (journalist)	Audiobook	Simon and Schuster Audio
2026-06-22	Regime Change: Inside the Imperial Presidency of Donald Trump	Maggie Haberman and Jonathan Swan	Audiobook	Simon and Schuster Audio

=== Theater ===
Year	Title	Role	Venue	Type	Notes
1990	Julius Caesar	Strato	Mark Taper Forum	Regional	Directed by Oskar Eustis
1992	The School for Husbands	Valere	Old Globe Theatre	Regional	Directed by Edward Payson Call
1993	Richard II	Aumerle	Shakespeare Theatre Company	Regional	Directed by Michael Kahn
1994	Julius Caesar	Flavius	Shakespeare Theatre Company	Regional	Directed by Joe Dowling
1994	Romeo & Juliet	Paris	Shakespeare Theatre Company	Regional	Directed by Barry Kyle
1994	The Illusion	Theogenes, Clindor, Calisto	The Shakespeare Theatre of New Jersey	Regional	Directed by Paul Mullins
1995	Troilus and Cressida	Troilus	Chicago Shakespeare Theater	Regional	Directed by Barbara Gaines
1996	Hamlet	Hamlet	Chicago Shakespeare Theater	Regional	Directed by Barbara Gaines
1995	Romeo and Juliet	Romeo	Hartford Stage Company	Regional	Directed by Mark Lamos with Calista Flockhart as Juliet
1996	The Rivals	Faukland	Hartford Stage Company	Regional	Directed by Mark Lamos
1997	More Stately Mansions	John Hartford	New York Theatre Workshop	Off-Broadway	Directed by Ivo van Hove
1998	Voices in the Dark	Owen	George Street Playhouse	Regional	Directed by Christopher Ashley
1999	Jolson Sings Again	Julian	George Street Playhouse	Regional	Directed by David Saint
1998	Avow	Tom	The Directors Company	Off-Broadway	Directed by Michael Parva
1999	Epic Proportions	Standby Benny/Phil	Helen Hayes Theatre	Broadway	Directed by Jerry Zaks
2000	Tantalus	Achilles, Neopotoleums, Aegisthus, Orestes	Denver Center for the Performing Arts; Barbican Centre	2000 U.S. tour, 2001 U.K.tour	Directed by Sir Peter Hall,
2001	The Royal Family	Perry Stewart	Haymarket Theatre	West End	Starring Judi Dench; Directed by Sir Peter Hall
2002	Sunday In The Park With George	George	Chicago Shakespeare Theater	Regional	Directed by Gary Griffin
2002	Compleat Female Stage Beauty	Edward Kynaston	Old Globe Theatre	Regional	Directed by Mark Lamos
2003	The Glass Menagerie	Tom	The Shakespeare Theatre of New Jersey	Regional	Directed by Robert Cuccioli
2004–2005	Fiddler on the Roof	Perchik	Minskoff Theatre	Broadway	Directed by David Leveaux; Tony Nomination for Best Revival of a Musical; Drama Desk Award for Outstanding Revival of a Musical
2005	Romeo & Juliet	Mercutio	Chicago Shakespeare Theater	Regional	Directed by Mark Lamos
2007	The Importance of Being Earnest	Algernon	various	U.S. tour	Starring Lynn Redgrave; Directed by Sir Peter Hall
2008	Spamalot	Sir Robin	Shubert Theater	Broadway, U.S. tour	Directed by Mike Nichols
2009	Happiness	Neil	Lincoln Center for the Performing Arts	Off-Broadway	Directed by Susan Stroman
2009–2010	Ragtime	Tateh	Neil Simon Theater	Broadway	Directed by Marcia Milgrom Dodge; Nominated: Tony Award for Best Revival of a Musical; Nominated: Drama Desk Award for Outstanding Revival of a Musical
2010	Absurd Person Singular	Sidney	Barrington Stage Company	Regional	Directed by Jesse Berger
2011	Follies	Buddy	Chicago Shakespeare Theater	Regional	Fall 2011; Directed by Gary Griffin
2011	Anything Goes	Lord Evelyn Oakleigh	Stephen Sondheim Theatre	Broadway	January 2012; Directed by Kathleen Marshall
2013	Camelot	King Arthur	Theatre Under The Stars	Regional	January 2013
2014	All The Way	Hubert Humphrey	Neil Simon Theatre	Broadway	January 2014; With Bryan Cranston
2014	Fiddler on the Roof	Tevye	Matlz Jupiter Theatre	Regional	January 2014; Directed by Marcia Milgrom Dodge
2015	39 Steps	Richard Hannay	Union Square Theatre	Broadway	April 2015; Directed by Maria Aitken
2016	Sweeney Todd: The Demon Barber of Fleet Street	Sweeney Todd	Denver Center for the Performing Arts	Regional	April - May 2016
2016	Ragtime	Tateh	Ellis Island	Concert	August 2016
2016 - 2017	Fun Home	Bruce Bechdel	various	U.S. tour	Directed by Sam Gold
2019	Ragtime	Tateh	Hobby Center	Theatre Under the Stars	
2023-2024	Moulin Rouge!	Harold Zidler	various	US Tour	September 2023 - November 2024
2024-2025	Moulin Rouge!	Harold Zidler	Al Hirschfeld Theatre	Broadway	November 2024 - January 2025
2025	Moulin Rouge!	Harold Zidler	various	US Tour	January - November 2025
2025-2026	Moulin Rouge!	Harold Zidler	Al Hirschfeld Theatre	Broadway	November 2025 - January 2026

== Filmography ==
=== Film and television ===
Year	Title	Role	Film/Television	Notes
1990	Quantum Leap	Scooter	TV series	Animal Frat - October 19, 1967
1996	Milk & Money	David	Comedy film	RKO Pictures, Blue Dolphin Productions
1997	The Secret of Anatasia	Prince Paul/Cheka as Robert Petcoff	Animation	Schwartz & Company
1999	Game Day	Flashy Agent Guy	Comedy film	Core Productions Inc.
1999	Law & Order	Dr. Matthew Carton	TV Series	DNR (#10.3) Wolf Films, Studios USA Television
2000	Tantalus: Behind the Mask	Achilles, Aegisthus, Neoptolemus, Orestes	TV Movie	Denver Center Media, Stage on Screen, WNET Channel 13 New York
2003	Hack	Bill Burke	TV Series	Sinners and Saints (#1.18)
2004	Chappelle's Show	"Racial Draft" Host "World Series of Dice" Host Reporter (Uncredited)	TV Series	Samuel Jackson Beer & Racial Draft (#2.1) World Series Of Dice & Mooney On Movies (#2.7) Lil Jon On Lil Jon & Black Bush (#2.13)
2006	Law & Order	Ken Lesavov	TV Series	Public Service Homicide (#17.5) Wolf Films, Studios USA Television
2010	Law & Order: Special Victims Unit	John Reilly	TV Series	Beef (#11.20) Wolf Films, Universal Media Studios (UMS)
2011	The Good Wife	Dr. Ben Truestall	TV Series	Killer Song (#2.18) Scott Free Productions, King Size Productions
2014	Forever	Cliff Wadlow	TV Series	The Ecstasy of Agony
2015	Elementary	Emil Kurtz	TV Series	You've Got Me, Who's Got You? #4.17 Ain't Nothing Like the Real Thing #4.21 Turn It Upside Down #4.22
