= Gore Verbinski =

American filmmaker (born 1964)

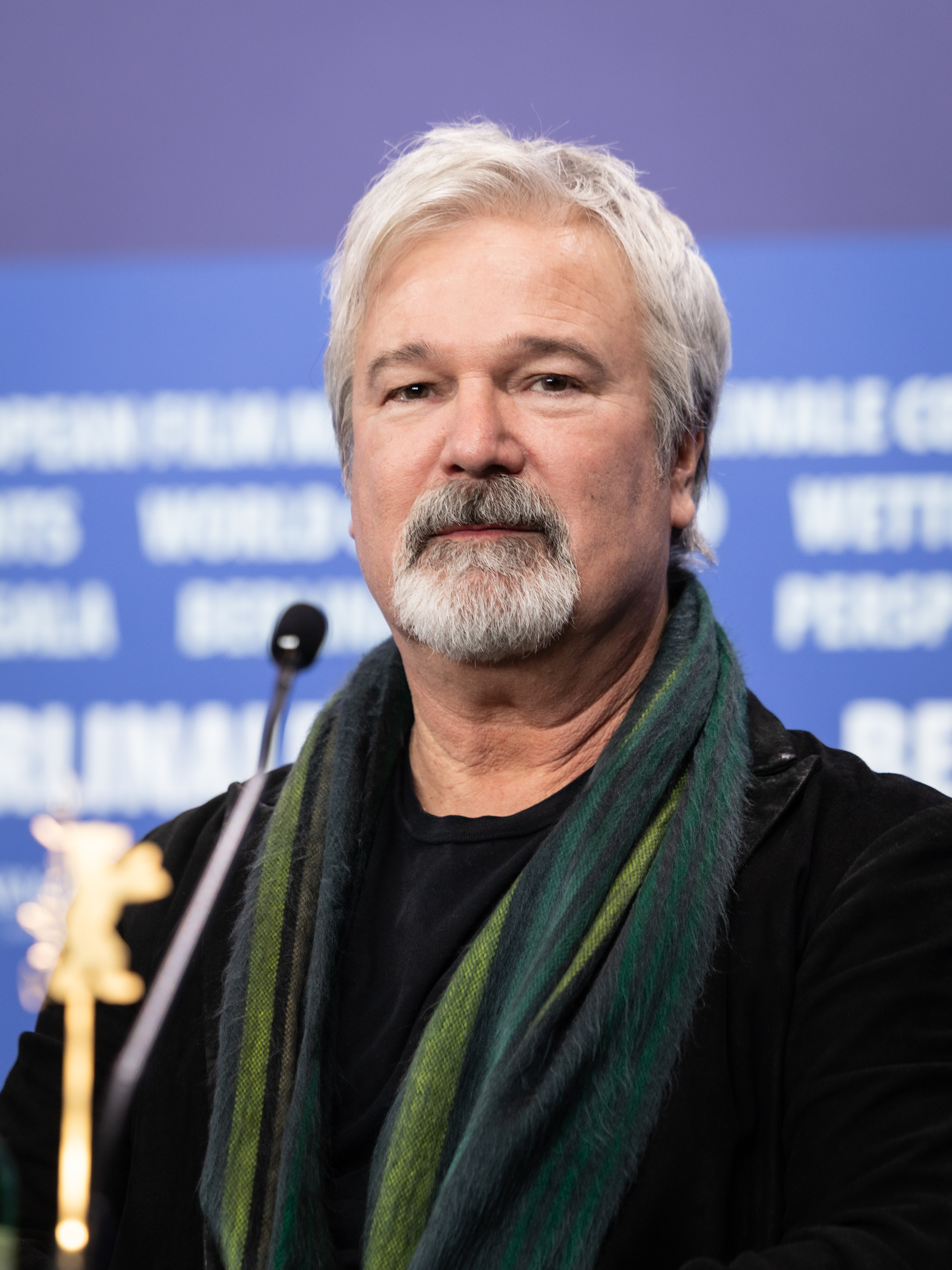
- Verbinski in 2026
- Born: Gregor Justin Verbinski; March 16, 1964 (age 62); Oak Ridge, Tennessee, U.S.
- Education: UCLA School of Theater, Film and Television
- Occupations: Film director; screenwriter; producer; musician
- Years active: 1989–present
- Notable work: Mouse Hunt; The Ring; Pirates of the Caribbean; Rango; The Lone Ranger
- Spouse: Clayton Verbinski
- Children: 2
- Awards: Academy Award for Best Animated Feature; Rango (2011); BAFTA Award for Best Animated Film; Rango (2011)
- Musical career
- Genre: Punk rock
- Instrument: Guitar
- Years active: 1980s-present
- Formerly of: Daredevils

Gregor Justin "Gore" Verbinski (born March 16, 1964) is an American film director, screenwriter, producer, and musician. He is best known for directing Mouse Hunt (1997), The Ring (2002), the first three Pirates of the Caribbean films, Rango (2011), and The Lone Ranger (2013). For Rango, Verbinski won both the Academy Award and the BAFTA Award for Best Animated Film.

== Early life ==
Verbinski was born in Oak Ridge, Tennessee, the fourth of five children of Laurette Ann (née McGovern) and Victor Vincent Verbinski, a nuclear physicist. His siblings are Janine, Claire, Diane, and Steven. His father was of Polish descent, and worked as a nuclear physicist at Oak Ridge National Laboratory. In 1967, the Verbinski family moved to Southern California, where a young Gregor grew up in the town of La Jolla. Gregor was an active Boy Scout and surfed regularly. He went to Torrey Pines Elementary, Muirlands Junior High, and La Jolla High School (Class of 1982), before attending UCLA Film School. Verbinski graduated with his BFA in Film in 1987. In his youth, Verbinski was passionate about music and played in several punk rock bands, which influenced his creative approach.

== Career ==
=== Music ===
Verbinski was active in several L.A. rock bands early in his career. He played guitar in the Daredevils, Bulldozer with John Thum, Mike Parma and Wiggy, the Drivers, and the all-star band the Cylon Boys Choir. He was also in a band called the Little Kings, which backed Stiv Bators on his version of "Have Love, Will Travel". The song was released by Bators in the fall of 1986 as a 12-inch single on Bomp! (catalogue No. 12136) and was later included in Bators' compilation album L.A. L.A. On the compilation album's liner notes, label owner Greg Shaw described the band as "an adequate but rootless Hollywood glam-damaged band with tattoos".

=== Film ===
His first films were a series of 8 mm films called The Driver Files c. 1979, when he was a young teen. After graduating from film school at UCLA, he got his first job as a script reader at the commercial production company Limelight in 1987. After director Julien Temple viewed some of his work, he signed to his production company Nitrate Films, and later Palomar Pictures, where he directed music videos for bands like Vicious Rumors, Bad Religion, NOFX, 24-7 Spyz and Monster Magnet. Verbinski moved from music videos to commercials, where he worked for many brand names including Nike, Coca-Cola, Canon, Skittles and United Airlines. One of his most famous commercials was for Budweiser, featuring frogs who croak the brand name. For his efforts in commercials, Verbinski won four Clio Awards and one Cannes Advertising Silver Lion.

After completing a short film, The Ritual (which he both wrote and directed), Verbinski made his feature film directing debut in 1997 with Mouse Hunt, which became a global hit. Following that film's success, Verbinski planned and developed several aborted projects; The Sky Is Falling, The Lighthouse, Mission to Mars, How Georgie Radbourn Saved Baseball, Where the Wild Things Are, The Big Ticket, The Light Princess, Catch Me If You Can, Project 3, and a remake of Ten Seconds to Hell.

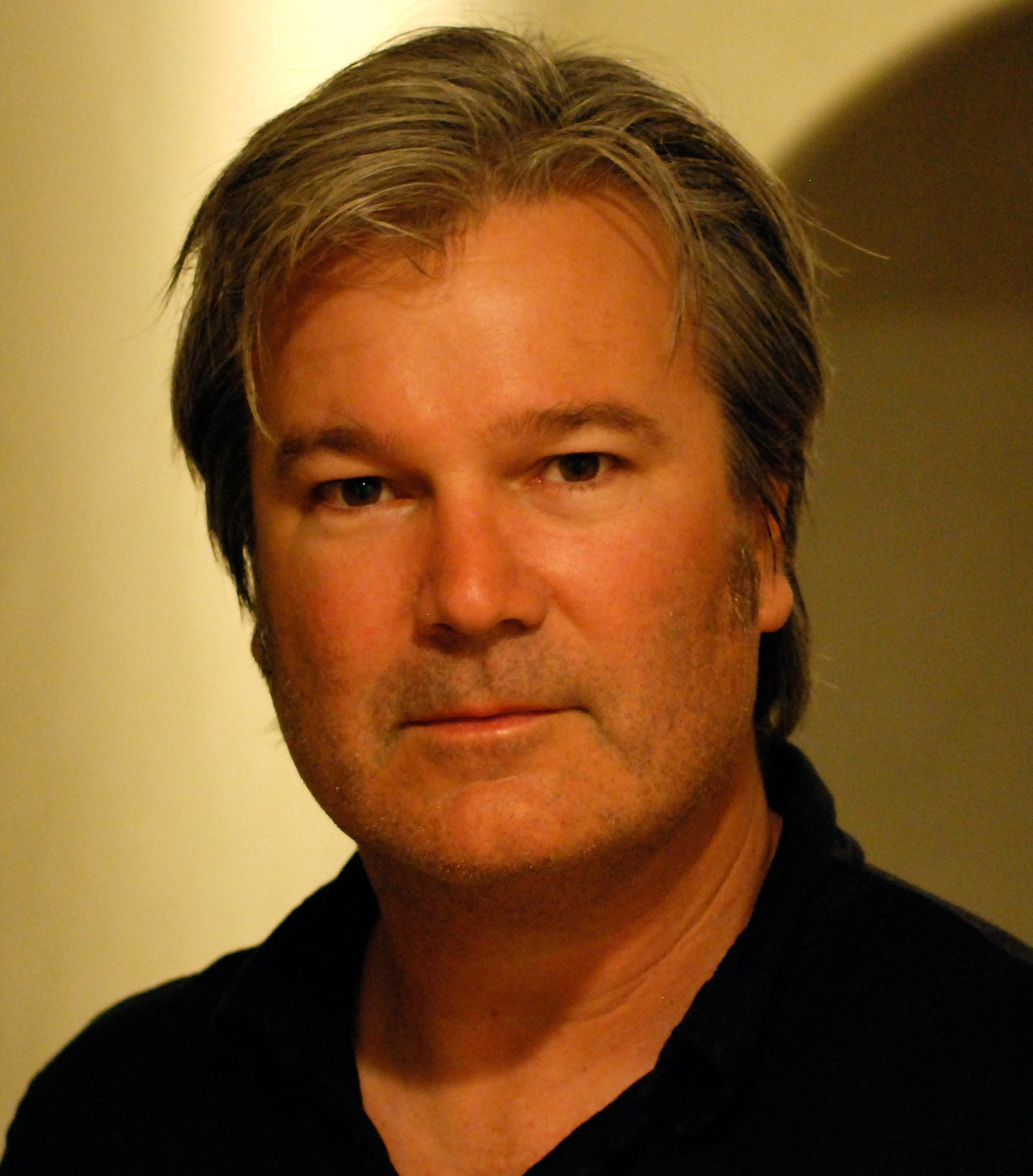
Verbinski in 2010

Verbinski returned in 2001 with the action/comedy The Mexican, starring Julia Roberts and Brad Pitt. The film received mixed reviews, and performed modestly at the box-office, earning $68 million domestically which was quite meager considering its star power (it was technically successful due to its moderately low $38 million budget). Verbinski followed it up with the horror film remake The Ring (2002), which struck gold globally, grossing well over $200 million worldwide. He was briefly in negotiations about returning to direct the sequel. Verbinski also had a directorial hand in The Time Machine that year, temporarily taking over for an exhausted Simon Wells. Verbinski directed some of the underground Morlock sequences and is given a "Thanks to" credit in the film.

He then directed the very successful Pirates of the Caribbean: The Curse of the Black Pearl which earned over $600 million at the international box office. This was his first collaboration with producer Jerry Bruckheimer, whom he has since collaborated with on several other movies. His next film was The Weather Man, which starred Nicolas Cage. The film received mixed to positive reviews but was a box office failure. In March 2005, he started filming the sequels Pirates of the Caribbean: Dead Man's Chest and Pirates of the Caribbean: At World's End. The former then became his biggest success so far, becoming the third film ever to gross over $1 billion at the international box office. In 2008, Verbinski's Blind Wink production company signed a deal with Universal. Verbinski was also set to direct a film for Universal based on the video game BioShock. However, budgetary and creative disputes stemming from Verbinski's wish to incorporate a functioning underwater rail transport system, driven by his noted fascination with trains, derailed development. Verbinski was then replaced by Juan Carlos Fresnadillo as director and the film was subsequently cancelled.

At the end of 2008, Verbinski and Universal Pictures acquired a 2007 Wall Street Journal article on the subjects of RPGs that would be used as the basis for a film which he would direct and co-produce. According to Variety, it "focuses on a married man who spends as many as 20 hours a day on a computer, existing through an avatar who is a thriving, musclebound entrepreneur. In reality, he is a diabetic, chain-smoking 53-year-old."

In 2010, Verbinski was involved to make his first foray into television with a drama project at Fox called Magical Law, written by Pirates of the Caribbean writer Terry Rossio, that was said to put a "supernatural twist on the cop/legal genre." In 2011 and 2013, he would delve into the Western genre, with decidedly different results: Rango was well received, critically and commercially, and earned the Academy Award for Best Animated Feature. However, his adaptation of the 1930s radio hero, The Lone Ranger for Disney, was not, the project having been stuck in development hell for several years, undergone rewrites and budget cuts, and gained controversy for the casting of Johnny Depp as the Native American Tonto. The film grossed $260 million against a $215–225 million budget, plus an estimated $150–160 million marketing campaign. That same year, he was also the executive producer of the Ben Stiller adaptation of The Secret Life of Walter Mitty, after having initially been attached in 2010 to direct the film himself.

In 2012, Verbinski announced three films in development at Blind Wink; the Western Bitterroot, the sci-fi film Spaceless, and a live action film based on the board game Clue. At various points, he was attached to direct all three films, before eventually opting to produce instead.

In 2014, New Regency dropped plans to adapt the graphic novel Pyongyang into a vehicle for Steve Carell, with Verbinski as director. Entitled Gregory the Nuisance, it was slated to start production in March 2015, but was cancelled due to the Sony cyberattack. The following year, Sony acquired a large scale action-adventure-comedy, for Verbinski to direct and Steve Conrad to write, about a "transcontinental car race with autonomous vehicles."

In 2016, Verbinski's horror film A Cure for Wellness starring Dane DeHaan and Mia Goth premiered at the Alamo Drafthouse before receiving a wide release in 2017. It received mediocre reviews from critics and was a financial bomb, grossing $26.6 million against a $40 million budget. Verbinski was set to next direct a film centering around the character Gambit, within the X-Men film universe, before dropping out of the project in January 2018. He afterwards signed on for Josh Bazell's Beat the Reaper, starring Sebastian Stan, which was not filmed.

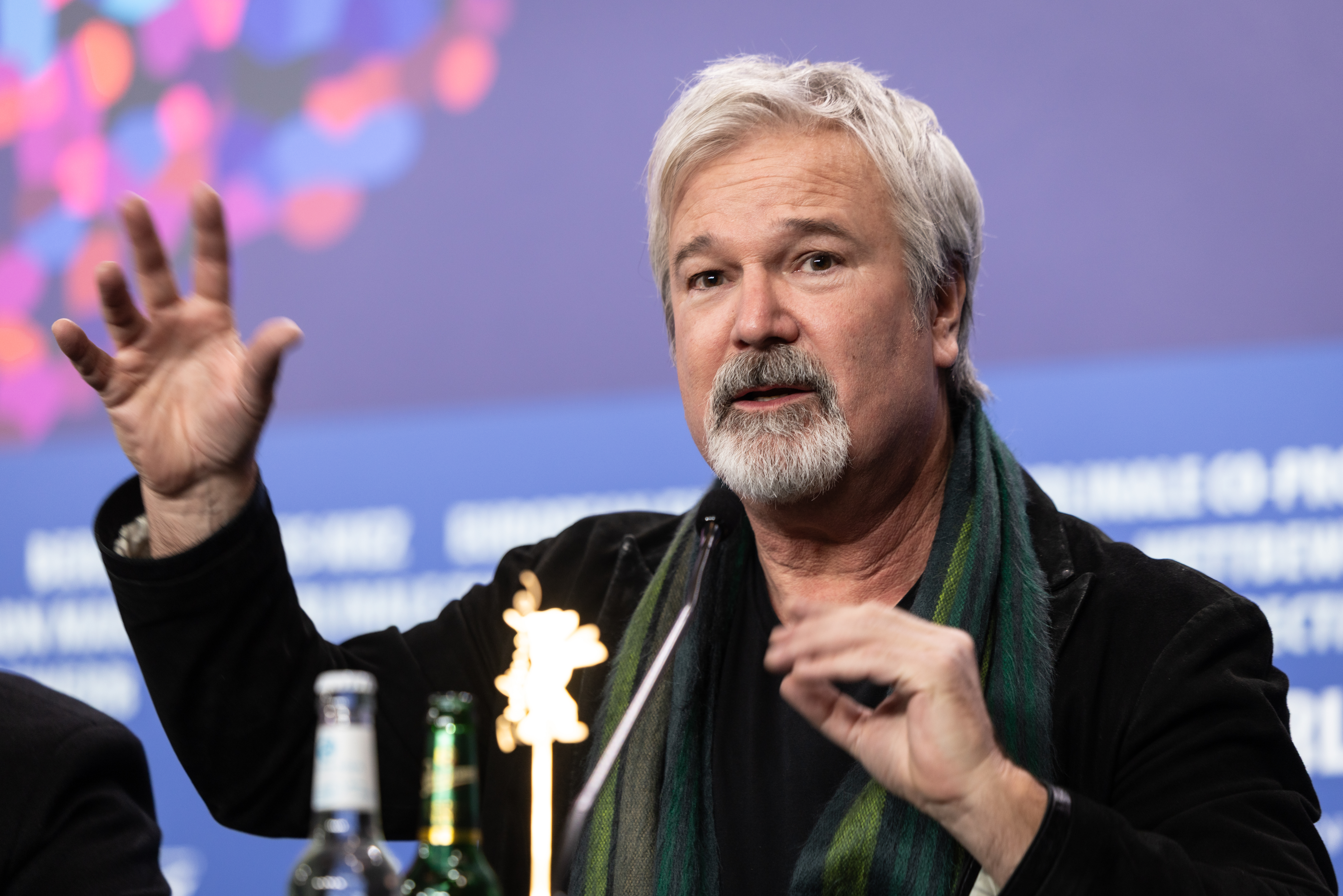
Verbinski at the press conference for the film Good Luck, Have Fun, Don't Die at the 2026 Berlin International Film Festival

In the 2020s, he was seeking financial backing for Cattywumpus, an animated feature about cats in outer space, after being in the works at Netflix. He was also working with writer Dennis Kelly on a feature version of the story "Sandkings" by George R. R. Martin. Both were set to be animated films, with Roger Deakins committed as cinematographer.

While promoting his comeback Good Luck, Have Fun, Don't Die, Verbinski divulged the voice cast of Cattywumpus: Anderson Paak, H.E.R., Glenn Close, Ice Cube, Andy Serkis, Michael Peña, Danny Glover and Michael Kenneth Williams. The backing band for the complete soundtrack was led by Ivan Neville and Dumpstaphunk.

Good Luck, Have Fun, Don't Die premiered at the 2025 Fantastic Fest, marking Verbinski's first film in nearly ten years, and was released in the United States on February 13, 2026 by Briarcliff Entertainment. It had its international premiere out of competition at the 76th Berlin International Film Festival. Verbinski teased that he had "two more" follow-ups to the film, which would only happen if the interest were there.

As of 2026, Verbinski is continuing to develop Sandkings and Cattywumpus, in addition to a "very strange" adaptation of Edward Gorey's The Gashlycrumb Tinies and "three or four original scripts". An eight-episode of version of The Stars, My Destination was also said to be in the planning stages.

=== Video game ===
Verbinski was involved with Matter, an original futuristic video game that was being developed for the Xbox 360 using Kinect. It would have used the Kinect peripheral. It was originally announced at E3 2012; the game was set in a universe similar to that of Tron, with futuristic, industrial graphics, and featured small, metallic balls as the main characters.

The game was announced to be cancelled about a year later. While reasons for the cancellation are unknown, a poster on the NeoGAF forums hinted at mismanagement and the studio's unfamiliarity with game development as the main problem.

== Filmography ==
=== Film ===
Year	Title	Director	Producer	Writer	Notes
1996	The Ritual	Yes	Yes	Yes	Short film
1997	Mouse Hunt	Yes	No	No	
2001	The Mexican	Yes	No	No	
2002	The Ring	Yes	No	No	
2003	Pirates of the Caribbean: The Curse of the Black Pearl	Yes	No	No	
2005	The Weather Man	Yes	No	No	
2006	Pirates of the Caribbean: Dead Man's Chest	Yes	No	No	
2007	Pirates of the Caribbean: At World's End	Yes	No	No	
2011	Rango	Yes	Yes	Story	Also voiced Sergeant Turley
2013	The Lone Ranger	Yes	Yes	No	
2016	A Cure for Wellness	Yes	Yes	Story	
2025	Good Luck, Have Fun, Don't Die	Yes	Yes	No	

Executive producer

- The Secret Life of Walter Mitty (2013)

=== Music videos ===
Year	Title	Artist
1989	"S&M Airlines"	NOFX
1990	"Don't Wait for Me"	Vicious Rumors
1990	"Fast and Frightening"	L7
1991	"Children"	Vicious Rumors
1992	"Stuntman"	24-7 Spyz
1992	"Atomic Garden"	Bad Religion
1993	"American Jesus"	Bad Religion
1994	"21st Century (Digital Boy)"	Bad Religion
1994	"Stranger than Fiction"	Bad Religion
1995	"Negasonic Teenage Warhead"	Monster Magnet
2004	"Born Too Slow"	The Crystal Method

== Awards and nominations ==
Award	Year	Category	Nominated work	Result	Ref.
Academy Awards	2012	Best Animated Feature	Rango	Won	
Amanda Awards	2004	Best Foreign Feature Film	Pirates of the Caribbean: The Curse of the Black Pearl	Nominated	
Annie Awards	2012	Outstanding Directing	Rango	Nominated	
Annie Awards	2012	Outstanding Writing	Rango	Won	
BAFTA Awards	2012	Best Animated Film	Rango	Won	
Cannes Lions International Festival of Creativity Awards	1995	Silver Lion	Budweiser: "Frogs"	Won	
Golden Globe Awards	2012	Best Animated Feature Film	Rango	Nominated	
Golden Raspberry Awards	2014	Worst Director	The Lone Ranger	Nominated	
Hollywood Film Awards	2003	Movie of the Year	Pirates of the Caribbean: The Curse of the Black Pearl	Won	
Hollywood Film Awards	2011	Animation of the Year	Rango	Won	
Hugo Awards	2004	Best Dramatic Presentation – Long Form	Pirates of the Caribbean: The Curse of the Black Pearl	Nominated	
Producers Guild of America Awards	2012	Outstanding Producer of Animated Theatrical Motion Pictures	Rango	Nominated	
Saturn Awards	2004	Best Director	Pirates of the Caribbean: The Curse of the Black Pearl	Nominated	

Year	Film	Academy Awards		BAFTA Awards		Golden Globe Awards	
Year	Film	Nominations	Wins	Nominations	Wins	Nominations	Wins
2003	Pirates of the Caribbean: The Curse of the Black Pearl	5		5	1	1	
2006	Pirates of the Caribbean: Dead Man's Chest	4	1	5	1	1	
2007	Pirates of the Caribbean: At World's End	2		1			
2011	Rango	1	1	1	1	1	
2013	The Lone Ranger	2					
Total		15	2	12	3	3	0
