= You Have to Stop This =

2011 children's novel by Pseudonymous Bosch

You Have To Stop This
- First edition (US)
- Author: Pseudonymous Bosch
- Illustrator: Gilbert Ford
- Language: English
- Series: Secret Series
- Genre: Mystery / Adventure / Fantasy
- Publisher: Little, Brown Books for Young Readers
- Publication date: 2011
- Publication place: United States
- English publication date: September 2011
- Media type: Hardcover
- Pages: 347
- ISBN: 978-0316076265 (first edition, hardcover)
- OCLC: 707964955
- LC Class: PZ7.B6484992 You 2011
- Preceded by: This Isn't What It Looks Like

You Have To Stop This is a book by the author Pseudonymous Bosch. It is the fifth book in The Secret Series, and it is a sequel to This Isn't What It Looks Like, This Book Is Not Good for You, If You're Reading This, It's Too Late, and The Name of this Book is Secret. This book is based on the sense of touch.

== Plot ==
The story begins with a picture of The Oath of Terces. There is a quick preface concerning an ibis bird that stands for a quick moment, but then crosses the River Nile. Then the story moves to an event happening at more or less the same moment. An innocent man is being executed moments after inscribing a fateful secret on a piece of papyrus in hieroglyphics. The story then moves forward in time with Cass and Max-Ernest heading to a garage sale Larry and Wayne are having. Cass confides to Max-Ernest that she hid the Jester's trunk in a pit behind the firehouse. They dig it out, open it, and discover that it contains a blue ring with a picture of an ibis and a scrap of linen. She discovers that they contain hieroglyphics meaning either "because what Ibis" or "because what Thoth". In the next chapter, Cass and Max-Ernest are on a bus with Yo-Yoji, discussing their field trip to the Egyptian section of the museum with classmates Glob and Danielle, who is only known for his dreadlocks but wishes to find a "thing" (something he is known for). They meet Danielle's father, Albert 3D (cause he has 3 degrees in different subjects) who shows them a handsome mummy who was executed for some strange reason. Cass reasons that it is the physician from hundreds of years ago, who was executed because of discovering The Secret. Cass, Yo-Yoji and Max decide to hang back and examine the mummy. She notices that the blue ring that she found in the Jester's trunk matches an imprint on the mummy's finger. Principal Johnson startles Cass when she scolds them for not staying with the group. Cass's jacket gets caught on the finger and she accidentally breaks it off. Later, as punishment, Albert 3D (who is actually pretty cool about what happened) makes them sort some museum sherds NOT shards as the scientific community calls them. While sorting, Cass convinces Yo Yoji and Max-Ernest to come with her to examine the mummy. When they do, they discover it is gone. Later, Albert 3D meets with their parents and tells them that if the kids are hiding the mummy, they should give it to him. When the kids and their parents return home late, the kids virtually chat. They watch the surveillance video and notice a shadowy figure exit the museum before they do. They also notice that the man's leg has a piece of cloth trailing behind him and realize the figure IS the mummy.

The story then moves to a luxurious hotel where Ms. Mauvais is talking to Amber, who has developed acne that horribly disfigures her face. She begs Ms. Mauvais to help her. The next day Cass and Max-Ernest meet Amber, who is a bit prettier than usual. That night, they have a TERCES meeting with Luciano as a special guest. He tells them that Lord Pharaoh wants Cass's ring and will get it from her, in addition to the mummy's missing finger. The trio decides to steal the finger from the museum. Cass wears a dress and her hair long. Max-Ernest and Yo-Yoji simply wear sunglasses and Yo wears a camera to pose as a tourist. The trio find the finger to already have been stolen and the monocle is found in its place. Suddenly, they hear voices and hide in a crate outside, that is eventually shipped to Las Vegas.

In Las Vegas, the trio discover that The invisible Pharaoh is posing as a magician and playing at a nearby theatre. Cass buys tickets to his show using some gold coins she saved from the Jester's trunk. She sells just one coin, and gets one tenth of its value, still a sizable amount in cash. They spend the next two hours having fun. First, they get sundaes. Then the boys go to adventure land and record their own rap video after 18 rides on a zip line. Cass reluctantly goes to a nail salon and is pampered. While she is there she sees a hieroglyphic, from the papyrus in the trunk she could not translate, on the window. The spa worker says it means "running water". Then, Yo-Yoji and Max-Ernest come meet her, and jokingly address her "Your Royal Hotness". They go to the theater, and Cass is tricked into handing over the ring onstage. While trapped in The Pharaoh's dressing room, Max-Ernest and Yo-Yoji discover some time travel chocolate, from the chocolate plantation, which is in the closet and invisible. They also discover a golden cape. They reason that the mummy didn't really walk by itself out of the museum, but was carried out by The Pharaoh who is invisible, so it looked like it was walking by itself. The duo runs onto the stage and throw the cape over The Pharaoh so he is visible. They force feed him the chocolate so he is transported to another era for good and becomes someone else's problem. The Skelton sisters, who were also present at the show, leave with Ms. Mauvais. Then, Cass impulsively puts the ring on the mummy's finger. It comes to life and Cass remembers the hieroglyphics from the papyrus and pieces together what they said, using knowledge form her Egypt class and what the spa worker said. She realizes the key to the secret is a question: Why did the ibis cross the river? And she asks the mummy this question. The mummy then speaks The Secret: "TO GET TO THE OTHER SIDE". The fact that The Secret that Terces society were protecting for years was a joke, is too much for Cass to handle, and for the first time in her life, she faints.

When she wakes up, Max-Ernest and Yo-Yoji are crouched over her. After finding out she is okay, Max-Ernest realizes that they need some means of escape. He charms the crowd, and runs out of the theater and meets a so-called cult that consists of people who claim to be the priests of Amun. They reveal themselves to be the members of the Terces Society. Cass and Yo-Yoji are already riding with them. When the trio return home, they are treated as heroes. Everyone they know, including Albert 3D and Daniel-not-Danielle. Albert and Cass's mother seem to be hitting it off and getting closer. Even Ms. Johnson welcomes them and gives them the Tuning Fork. Later, Cass confides in Pietro about the secret, who explains that the real secret is "The Other Side". He also explains that his brother died that morning. When Cass goes into his trailer again, he has disappeared. The story then moves to graduation, where Max-Ernest gives a speech, and makes everyone cry. Cass and Yo-Yoji are very proud of what their friend had said and the trio smiles to each other. Then, Cass and Yo-Yoji's hands brush against each other, and Cass is turned out to be both shocked and shy when she finds their pinkies interlocked, indicating some sort of romance between Cass and Yo-Yoji. The story ends, as the entire auditorium begins to clap and Amber quietly exits the edge of the bleachers. No one (especially her parents) notice her get into a limousine with Ms. Mauvais and drive slowly into the sunset, in search of a never setting sun.

The epilogue reveals Mr. Bosch to be Max-Ernest. He does not reveal what happens to Cass or Yo Yoji, or anyone else. He says that the Secret itself is a secret that opens up more secrets and warns the reader not to let anyone give away the ending.

== Characters ==
- Cassandra - She is a survivalist, she always comes prepared with all of her supplies in her backpack. She is also a member of the secret Terces Society. She has had her heart set on figuring out a secret that was known only by a certain pharaoh and his advisor, known to them as Dr. Amun.
- Max Ernest - Cass's best and first friend, and a member of the Terces Society as well. He is very smart, and loves jokes. Sometimes his friends get annoyed from his pointless rants. Does not understand sarcastic remarks very well. Sometimes insecure but ends up being one of the most useful characters in the story. He seems to be neurodivergent
- Yo Yoji - Yo Yoji is from Japan, he usually wears neon trainers and helps Cass and Max-Ernest on their missions. He also has a talent in playing guitar and helps find Mr.Cabbage Face on their mission sent from Pietro. In “You Have To Stop This”, Yo-Yoji and Cass interlocked their pinkies.
- Daniel-Not-Danielle - One of the friends of the protagonists. His name is usually mispronounced by people, which he keeps correcting.
- Glob - He is one of Cass's and Max-Ernest's friends who likes to write blogs.
- Owen - He is an important member of the Terces Society. He is an expert in disguises and helps Cass and Max-Ernest almost at all times.
- Pietro Bergamo - Head of the Terces Society. His sole goal is to stop the Midnight Sun's actions. Apart from being the leader he is also a magician. Pietro is Luciano's brother.
- Mrs. Johnson - Annoying principal of Cass and Max Ernest.
- Albert 3-D (Dr. Ndefdo)- A Nigerian scholar of archeology. Begins a romantic relationship with Melanie, Cass's adoptive mom. His son is Daniel-Not-Danielle.
- Luciano Bergamo - Head of the notorious Midnight Sun, a group of alchemists determined to find the Secret. Also Pietro Bergamo's twin brother. He kills himself by stopping drinking the elixirs provided by the Midnight Sun. He then turns old and visits Pietro before he died. He proved that he was on the Terces side by doing this
- Amber - popular girl that works for the Midnight Sun. Obsessed with Skelton sisters.
- Lord Pharaoh - founder of the Midnight Sun. His ultimate aim is to find the secret and gain immortal life.
- Pseudonymous Bosch - minor in one part (that is not part of book) he also is addicted to chocolate. we find out later that he is Max-Ernest. However, there are several clues previous to this suggesting that they were the same person.
- Ms. Mauvais - Part of the Midnight Sun, always wears white gloves to hide her aged hands. She is behind all the evil plans and wants to be forever young.
- Grandpas Larry and Wayne - These two men are Cass's adoptive grandparents. They are obsessed with collecting old, broken objects, and store everything in their home, which is an abandoned fire station. Larry was once Mel's old high school teacher. Mr. Wallace was once their accountant.
- Romi and Montana Skelton - twins that are the head of their own teen production company (twin hearts inc.) and part of the Midnight Sun.
- Lily - nemesis of Ms. Mauvais after being captured by the Midnight sun because of her synesthaesia.
- Dr. Amun - Egyptian doctor -said to have figured out the Secret, which is what killed him.
- Mr. Wallace - The Terces Society archivist, also the oldest living member of the Terces society.
- The Jester - Cass's great (and others) grandfather.

== Reception ==
Booklist reviewed the novel.
