= A Whole Nother Story =

2010 book by Cuthbert Soup

- First edition
- Author: Dr. Cuthbert Soup
- Illustrator: Jeffrey Stewart
- Cover artist: Jeffrey Stewart
- Language: English
- Series: Whole Nother Story Series
- Published: 9/28/2010
- Publisher: Bloomsbury Publishing
- Publication place: U.S
- Pages: 288
- ISBN: 9781599905181
- Followed by: Another Whole Nother Story

A Whole Nother Story is a children's book of spy fiction published in 2010 by Gerry Swallow, using the pen name Dr. Cuthbert Soup. It is his debut novel.

== Plot ==
The story begins by introducing the Cheeseman family: the scientist Mr. Ethan Cheeseman, his wife Olivia, three 'attractive, witty, and relatively odor-free' children and the family pets; a psychic dog named Pinky, and Steve, a talking sock puppet.

Ethan and his wife are about to complete a time machine, and two top-secret agents show up to steal it. Initially, the antagonists use diplomacy, claiming that they need the invention for "the greater good". Their motives are suspect, and Olivia, realizing this, refuses. Shortly thereafter, Olivia contacts a mysterious illness and dies.

The family initially grieves but not for long. They are being targeted and followed by many people. The agents are revealed as employees for a weapons developer. Ethan plans to travel back in time, reunite with his wife, and escape pursuit; but the time machine isn't working. He, his family, and the machine take to the road in a station wagon.

Pursued by the incompetent but determined agents, the Cheeseman family is forced to flee repeatedly. During their travels they encounter a number of other wanderers.

=== Recurring gags ===
The story has many recurring gags; for example, Dr. Soup's end-of-chapter 'unsolicited' advice. The Cheeseman kids also rename themselves with every move, with humorous results.

== Characters ==
- Ethan Cheeseman- A "Scientist of Tomorrow" who has built a time machine, named the Luminal Velocity Regulator (abbreviated the LVR).
- Olivia Cheeseman- Ethan's wife, who has died before the events of this novel.
- Jough Psymthe- Ethan's eldest son; he is fourteen. This is the name he goes by for the majority of the book.
- Magenta-Jean "Maggie" Jurgenson- Ethan's daughter; she is twelve. This is the name she goes by for the majority of the book. Maggie is very fond of her long auburn hair, which reminds her of her mother.
- Gerard LaFontaine- Ethan's youngest son; he is eight. This is the name he goes by for the majority of the book. Has a big imagination. Also has a sock puppet named Steve.
- Pinky- The Cheesemans' hairless dog who is psychic and can forewarn danger.
- Captain Jibby Lodbrok- Olivia's great-great-great-great-great-grandfather from the year 1668. He is a pirate. He and his crew have traveled from 1668 to the twenty-first century due to a lightning bolt. His crew also works as a circus.
- Three-Eyed Jake- One of Captain Jibby's crew. Is Captain Jibby's best friend. He is called Three-Eyed Jake because of his glasses and his eyepatch.
- Dizzy- One of Captain Jibby's crew. Suffers from vertigo.
- Aristotle- One of Captain Jibby's crew. Is a psychic with short-term memory loss.
- Sammy- One of Captain Jibby's crew. Has the strength of two and a half men, but has a back injury.
- Juanita- Captain Jibby's wife.
- Mr. 5- The main villain of the story; he works for an evil weapons company named Plexiwave.
- Mr. 29, Mr. 88, Mr. 207- Mr. 5's evil henchmen who also work for Plexiwave. They are not too bright.
- Aitch Dee- A top-secret government agent; he is shaped like a kite.
- El Kyoo- A top-secret government agent who works with Aitch Dee; he is shaped like a bowling pin.
- Pavel Dushenko- A foreign spy who wants the LVR.
- Leon- Pavel Dushenko's sidekick who is a monkey. Loves to look at the fish in his aquarium.
- Buck Weston- A cowboy the Cheesemans meet while moving towns. He wants to be a poet.
- Elliot Walsingham- Jough's friend he makes in the town the Cheesemans move into. He plays the bass drum and wants to be an attorney.
- Aurora Codgill- Maggie's friend she makes in the town the Cheesemans move into. She is an artist. She has two younger brothers, Danny and Tommy.
- Danny and Tommy Codgill- Gerard's friends he makes in the town the Cheesemans move into. They are brothers who have a secret spy fort. They have a sister, Aurora.

== Themes ==
The book's main themes are family solidarity and togetherness through difficulty: in times of need, a family is the best support. Ethan is shown to care very deeply about his children and is always protective. Broadly, the book explores the following:-

- Cleverness
- Courage, Bravery, Heroism
- Creativity and Imagination
- Honor

== Development history ==
In an interview with Cassandra Clare, Dr. Cuthbert Soup revealed: "My inspiration for A Whole Nother Story was the result of a trip to my friendly neighborhood bookstore. And when I say friendly, I mean a little too friendly. They hug you on the way in. Creepy, to say the least. Anyway, while perusing the bookstore aisles (and dodging the overly familiar sales staff) I spotted, high upon one of the shelves, a very conspicuous empty slot. Needless to say I was appalled and I decided right there and then that someone needed to write something immediately in order to fill that awful black hole of booklessness. That person, I decided, should be Nathaniel Hawthorne. Then I remembered that Nathaniel Hawthorne is dead. I realized then that it would be up to me to plug up that awful void between War and Peace and Wig Making for Dummies. The result is A Whole Nother Story. Perhaps I'll tell it to you sometime."

On the children changing names, Dr. Soup said, "I suppose it could be said that I have multiple names being that my full name is Cuthbert Hubert Egbert Soup and my real last name is Schoupenstein, which was shortened when my family immigrated to America from Vienna at the height of the Great Sausage Famine. I don't mind the fact that they chose to shorten my family name but to be honest it makes my cousin, Minestrone, absolutely livid."

Dr. Soup jokingly remarked that he, "holds a Ph.D in Unsolicited Advice."

== Reviews ==
Kirkus Reviews gave it a positive review, comparing Soup to Dave Barry. "Soup... positively channels Dave Barry for type of humor, comic timing and general style...Great fun." Amazon praised the book, writing, "Middle grade readers who dig the tongue-twisters, quirky villains, hilarious hijinx, and brave and brainy kids of the Secret Series by Pseudonymous Bosch will find lots to laugh-out-loud about in A Whole Nother Story" and further added "every page of this debut novel, narrated by the unusual Dr. Cuthbert Soup, is full of snappy dialogue, unexpected twists and turns, and unsolicited advice on subjects ranging from how to choose a dog to timely advice on time travel."

Publishers Weekly a positive review, citing humorous and tongue-in-cheek narrative: "The storytelling, which merges deadpan narration with an absurdist sense of humor, is the real star of this fast-paced adventure." Angela Sherill of Publishers Weekly compared the narrative style of Dr. Soup with Lemony Snicket and Jonathan Stroud. "Young readers will enjoy Dr. Soup's voice, likening him to Lemony Snicket or Jonathan Stroud's Bartimaeus."

The negative reviews mentioned unrealized characterization in the story, and the repetitious foolhardiness of some characters. It received a mixed review by the School Library Journal: "The inanity can be wearing and the characters (except for the youngest Cheeseman's sock puppet, Steve) don't quite gel into fully realized people. Still, those who enjoyed Lemony Snicket's A Series of Unfortunate Events will find some of the same surreal qualities in this first book in a series—and a bit more warmth besides."

== Awards ==
A Whole Nother Story was selected by Kirkus Reviews at the end of the year as one of the best children's books of 2010.

It has been selected by The Junior Library Guild.

== Sequel ==
Owing to the success of A Whole Nother Story, Dr. Soup wrote a sequel entitled Another Whole Nother Story, released on February 24, 2012.
