= The Arcana Chronicles =

- Author: Kresley Cole
- Country: United States
- Language: English
- Genre: Fantasy romance young adult
- Publisher: Simon & Schuster
- Published: 2012–present
- Media type: Print (hardcover and paperback), audiobook, e-book
- No. of books: 7

The Arcana Chronicles is a young adult fantasy romance series written by American author Kresley Cole and published by Valkyrie Press and Simon & Schuster. The main protagonist is Evie Greene.

== Books ==
1. Poison Princess. New York: Simon & Schuster Books For Young Readers. 2012. ISBN 978-1-4424-3664-0.
2. Endless Knight. New York: Simon & Schuster Books for Young Readers. 2013. ISBN 978-1-4424-3667-1.
3. Dead of Winter. New York: Simon & Schuster BFYR. 2015. ISBN 978-1-4814-2345-8.
4. Day Zero. Valkyrie Press. 2016. ISBN 978-0-9972151-3-7. (Note: Day Zero is a novella that takes place between Dead of Winter and Arcana Rising.)
5. Arcana Rising. Valkyrie Press. 2016. ISBN 978-0-9972151-5-1.
6. The Dark Calling. Valkyrie Press. 2018. ISBN 978-0-9981414-1-1.
7. From the Grave. Valkyrie Press. 2023. ISBN 978-0-998-14147-3.
