= Dead of Winter =

Dead of Winter may refer to:

- Dead of Winter (1987 film), a thriller film
- Dead of Winter (2025 film), an action-thriller film
- "Dead of Winter" (short story), a 2006 horror story
- The Dead of Winter, a 2006 novel by Rennie Airth
- Dead of Winter (Cole novel), a 2015 young adult fantasy novel written by Kresley Cole
- Dead of Winter (Goss novel), a 2011 Doctor Who novel by James Goss
- "The Dead of Winter", an episode of the TV series Lewis (TV series)
- Dead of Winter: A Cross Roads Game, a board game by Plaid Hat Games set in a zombie apocalypse
- The Dead of Winter, 1975 novel by Dominic Cooper

== See also ==
- Winter solstice
- Midwinter (disambiguation)
