= Bad Magic (Pseudonymous Bosch) =

2014 novel by Pseudonymous Bosch

- First edition
- Author: Pseudonymous Bosch
- Genre: fantasy, adventure
- Published: 2014
- Publisher: Little, Brown
- ISBN: 9780316320405

Bad Magic is the successor of The Secret Series by Pseudonymous Bosch. It takes place in a mysterious summer camp for delinquents. It was published in 2014. It centers on Paul-Clay (otherwise known just as Clay), Max Ernest's brother and is part of the series Bad Books. The books in the series are Bad Magic, Bad Luck, and Bad News.

== Reception ==
Commenting on "Bosch’s mix of slapstick silliness, sly authorial asides, and magical adventure", Krista Hutley, writing for Booklist, compared Bad Magic to Lemony Snicket and M. T. Anderson’s Pals in Peril series.

Hutley and Kirkus Reviews discussed out the allusions and parallels with Shakespeare's plays, which Hutley called "interesting but extraneous". Kirkus similarly concluded that they "aren’t particularly integral to the plot". Publishers Weekly also mentioned allusions to Lord of the Flies, Gilligan's Island, and Lost.

Discussing the plot, Hutley indicated that "the story takes a bit too long to develop". Kirkus stated that the plot twists "are more inscrutable than clever".

Publishers Weekly also mentioned Gilbert's illustration, saying they "bring in additional humor".
