= Barbara Gaines =

Barbara Gaines may refer to:

- Barbara Gaines (director), American theatre director and founder of the Chicago Shakespeare Theater
- Barbara Gaines (television producer) (born 1957), American television producer
