= Dead of Winter (Cole novel) =

2015 novel by Kresley Cole

- First edition (publ. Simon & Schuster)
- Author: Kresley Cole
- Language: English
- Publication date: 2015

Dead of Winter is a 2015 young adult fantasy novel written by Kresley Cole. It is the third part of The Arcana Chronicles series. The main theme of the novel is the love triangle between a group of teens possessing tarot-themed powers: Jack, Evie and Death.
