= Robert Bazell =

American journalist

- Education: University of California, Berkeley
- Occupation: Professor
- Title: Adjunct professor of Molecular Cellular and Developmental Biology at Yale University
- Spouse: Margot Weinshel
- Children: Rebecca, Josh and Stephanie
- Website: NBC News Biography

Robert Bazell is adjunct professor of Molecular Cellular and Developmental Biology at Yale University. He is the former chief science and health correspondent for NBC News.

== Biography ==
=== Education ===
Bazell graduated from the University of California, Berkeley, USA, in 1967 with a B.A. in biochemistry and Phi Beta Kappa honors. As an undergraduate, he wrote a science column called "Science for the People" for the Daily Californian. Afterwards, Bazell traveled to England, where he studied biology at the University of Sussex in 1969 as part of his graduate work, before returning to Berkeley to complete his doctoral degree in immunology.

=== Career ===
Bazell continued pursuing his dual interest in journalism and science by joining Science magazine in 1971 and writing for its News and Comment section. A year later, he left the publication to become a reporter for the New York Post. In 1976, he began his long career in broadcast journalism by joining WNBC in New York as a reporter before moving to NBC News.

At NBC, Bazell was one of the first network news correspondents to report on the emerging AIDS epidemic in the early 1980s. He continued to cover health and science issues for the network. Also in 1986, he was also a reporter and chief space correspondent during the Space Shuttle Challenger disaster when he reported about the explosion of the Space Shuttle on the January 28, 1986 episode of NBC Nightly News. In 1998, Bazell wrote and published HER-2: The Making of Herceptin, a Revolutionary Treatment for Breast Cancer, which chronicled the creation of Herceptin, a drug used to treat breast cancer; the book received a positive review from the New York Times. The 2008 Lifetime film Living Proof, about a doctor who devotes his life's work to finding a cure for breast cancer, is based on the book.

On March 22, 2013 it was announced that Bazell would be leaving NBC after 38 years. He has joined Yale University, where he is serving as an adjunct professor in the Department of Molecular, Cellular and Developmental Biology.

== Awards ==
His extensive coverage in the 1980s of the nascent AIDS epidemic, which included reports from the United States, Africa, Europe, the Caribbean and South America, earned him the Alfred I. duPont-Columbia Award and the Maggie Award from Planned Parenthood. He also garnered two Emmys for his reports on the human brain; he has won five Emmys in total. In 1993, Bazell was honored with the George Foster Peabody Award for which he was recognized for exemplifying "the best reporting on science and medicine. From transmission of the AIDS virus to innovations in cancer treatment, from the perceived dangers of cellular phones to alternative modes of health care, Mr. Bazell brings intelligence, understanding and reportorial excellence to the task. Robert Bazell is an outstanding television reporter who recognizes when to speak, when to listen and when to tell.". Mr. Bazell was presented the Hope Funds Award in Advocacy in 2008.

== Personal ==
Bazell and his wife, Margot Weinshel, reside in New York. Bazell has three children: Rebecca, Josh and Stephanie.

== Books ==
Bazell, Robert. HER-2: The Making of Herceptin, a Revolutionary Treatment for Breast Cancer. Random House, October 1998. ISBN 0-609-00099-3
