= The Name of this Book is Secret =

Novel by Pseudonymous Bosch

The Name of This Book is secret
- First edition (US)
- Author: Pseudonymous Bosch
- Illustrator: Gilbert Ford
- Language: English
- Series: The Secret Series
- Genre: Mystery and adventure
- Publisher: Little, Brown
- Publication date: 2007
- Publication place: United States
- Media type: Hardcover
- Pages: 360
- ISBN: 0-316-11366-2
- Followed by: If You're Reading This, It's Too Late

The Name of this Book is Secret is a 2007 fantasy novel for young readers by Pseudonymous Bosch. It chronicles the adventures of two children, Cass and Max-Ernest, as they investigate the mysterious death of local magician Pietro Bergamo. The book, like the others in the series, is known for its intrusive narration, in which Bosch briefly interrupts the story for various reasons.

A sequel was published in late 2008, under the name If You're Reading This, It's Too Late. A third book was released on September 1, 2009, with the title This Book Is Not Good for You. A fourth book, This Isn't What It Looks Like, was released on August 22, 2010. A fifth book was released on September 20, 2011 and is titled You Have to Stop This.

== Summary ==
"Cassandra", given a pseudonym by the narrator, is an eleven-year-old survivalist. One day, at her grandfather's antique store, the Fire Sale, a real estate agent named Gloria Fortune leaves a box labeled "The Symphony of Smells", which she brings to school the next day. That day, while she investigates a dead rat in her schoolyard, she meets "Max-Ernest", who talks too much, loves jokes, and has divorced parents. Max-Ernest tries out one of his jokes on Cass, who tells him that his joke doesn't make sense, thus fostering a conversation between the two. Cass shows Max-Ernest the Symphony of Smells, and they decode a message for help hidden inside it. Cass and Max-Ernest come to the decision to visit the dead magician's house to find out why he needs help. Now collaborators, Cass and Max-Ernest go to investigate the dead magician's house and find the magician's mysterious journal hidden in his secret study. However, Gloria comes in with a young couple, Ms. Mauvais and Dr. L., looking for a house. It becomes evident that they are looking for the magician's journal. When they are spotted leaving with it, they are forced to flee.

After reaching home, the kids find a riddle written on the first page of the journal, but the rest of it is empty. Cass solves the riddle on the way to school the next day, discovering that the magician's story is written underneath the double-layered pages of the journal. She and Max-Ernest read the story and discover that the magician, Pietro Bergamo, had a brother, Luciano, who was stolen by a blonde woman with a voice like ice when they were children. Pietro and Luciano were synesthetic circus performers and used their senses in their magic acts. Pietro believed that the Golden Lady, as he called the beautiful blonde woman, was kidnapping synesthetic children, for some reason, discovering that a young Chinese violinist with the condition was kidnapped years later by the same woman. Cass suspects that the Golden Lady is Ms. Mauvais, but Max-Ernest points out that this is impossible, as the story took place at a time before she could have been born.

Meanwhile, an emergency is taking place at the school: Benjamin Blake has disappeared. Cass believes it was Dr. L and Ms. Mauvais who took the boy, having seen them inquiring about Benjamin's art earlier at her school and seeing them leave in a limousine printed with the words, "Midnight Sun Sensorium and Spa". This leads to Cass and Max-Ernest having a fight and thus not investigating together further; however, Cass decides to look for Benjamin Blake on her own.

After looking through some spa brochures collected by her mother, Cass locates a spa called the Midnight Sun Spa & Sensorium and decides to pose as one of the Skelton Sisters, a pair of twin pop singers. After being driven to the spa, Cass meets Owen, her stuttering butler. After being subject to several spa treatments, Cass goes looking for Benjamin Blake, only to end up in Ms. Mauvais' office, where Ms. Mauvais tells her that there will be a surprise guest coming for dinner. The surprise guest is none other than Max-Ernest, who came to save Cass. Ms. Mauvais demands to be given the magician's journal, and in the commotion that takes place, her glove is ripped off, revealing an ancient-looking hand. Cass and Max-Ernest realize that all of the Midnight Sun members are extremely old, as they are alchemists on a search for the Secret, which they believe will give them immortality. They also deduce that Dr. L is really Luciano, Pietro's long-lost brother.

Cass and Max-Ernest are locked in their room following their discovery, but Owen reveals himself as a spy and unties the children. They go to the pyramid in the center of the spa grounds through a secret tunnel in Ms Mauvais' office and see that Dr. L and Ms. Mauvais are about to remove Benjamin's brain in front of a crowd of hundreds of Midnight Sun members. They distract Dr. L by using vials from the Symphony of Smells to spell out the word "HELP", convincing Dr. L that Pietro has come for him. However, as Dr. L begins to run up the pyramid, the kids, afraid that he will see them, throw a rope down the hole in the top of the pyramid to climb down. After the rope catches fire, they are forced to find a different path of escape before the spa burns down. Cass and Max-Ernest manage to save Benjamin and are driven home by Owen.

Some time later, Gloria delivers another box to the Fire Sale. The box contains gadgets for each of the kids–a backpack for Cass and a Decoder disguised as a gameboy for Max-Ernest.

== Characters ==
Cassandra, nicknamed Cass, is an 11-year-old girl and one of the two protagonists of the novel. She is a self-proclaimed survivalist and prides herself on her extensive knowledge of various disasters as well as her ubiquitous backpack, which she fills with survival gear. Although she initially prefers to work alone, she befriends Max-Ernest and allows him to accompany her. She is often seen with braided hair but is mostly known for her large, pointy ears. She lives with a single mother and does not know who her father is but is on good terms with her so-called substitute grandfathers. In book three, she finds out that she is adopted.

Max-Ernest is an 11-year-old boy and aspiring comedian. His parents went through their version of a "divorce" shortly after his birth because they couldn't decide whether to name him Max or Ernest. They combined both choices into one name before splitting their house down the middle so that Max-Ernest would still get to live with both parents. He is believed to have some sort of disorder, although what it is remains a mystery. During the course of the book, he makes his first friend: Cass. He ensures that every hair on his head is of equal length, for philosophical reasons: he wants each and every hair treated with equality. He is shown to enjoy riddles, magic, and jokes.

Ms. Mauvais and Dr. L, the antagonists of the novel, are members of the Midnight Sun, a society devoted to finding the Secret in the hopes of gaining eternal life. Once they find out Cass and Max-Ernest have his notebook, they are willing to go to any lengths to take it from them. It is revealed that Dr. L is Pietro Bergamo's twin brother. He is described as tall with silver hair, tanned skin, and white teeth. Ms. Mauvais's attributes resemble those of a Barbie doll: big eyes, a tiny waist, stylish blonde hair, and gold jewelry. Thus, Pietro refers to her as the Golden Lady; he also notes her icy voice. Ms. Mauvais and Dr. L are much older than they look; they wear long gloves to hide their wrinkled skin, which only appears on their hands.

Pietro Bergamo is the synesthetic magician who was given The Symphony of Smells by Ms. Mauvais many years ago. Cass and Max-Ernest find his journal whilst exploring his house. He joined the circus with his twin brother Luciano, also synesthetic, before Luciano was sold off to Ms. Mauvais. Although the narrator often refers to him as "dead," Cass and Max-Ernest receive a note from him in code which they decipher. Pietro's initials are used at the end of the note.

Benjamin Blake is a synesthetic boy who goes to Cass and Max-Ernest's school. He became well known for winning an art contest due to his condition's influence on his work. He is kidnapped by Dr. L. and Ms. Mauvais as they believe his brain would help them find information on the Secret. He mumbles to the point of near-unintelligibility.

Grandpa Larry and Grandpa Wayne are Cass's grandfathers. Because her biological grandparents are unknown, Larry and Wayne stepped in as her "substitute" grandparents. Grandpa Larry was Cass' mother's history teacher when she was in high school; while Wayne's relationship with Larry or Cass is not stated, Bosch has confirmed that he is in a relationship with Larry. They own a shop established in an old abandoned fire station known as The Fire Sale, where they live with their blind and nearly deaf dog, Sebastian, dubbed the Seeing-Nose Dog.

Owen is introduced as Cass's butler when she is taken to the Midnight Sun. When they first meet, he has a strong stutter and appears to be shy but friendly. However, he is revealed to be a spy for the Terces society who helps Cass and Max-Ernest escape the Midnight Sun with Benjamin Blake. Owen's most notable characteristic is his predilection for disguises, for which he can drastically alter his appearance and speaking voice.

Amber is Cass's classmate, often called the nicest girl in school and third prettiest; however, she is often shown to be snooty and gossipy. She is a fan of the Skelton Sisters and a consumer of their lip balm line, Smoochies. She receives a new flavor each week and gives the old one away, often to Cass.

Gloria Fortune is a probate specialist or a "real estate agent for the dead." She often finds herself at the Fire Sale delivering items after clearing out homes belonging to the deceased. She loves to gossip and runs into Cass at the Midnight Sun Spa and Sensorium; however, she later has no recollection of her visit to the spa.
