= Marcia Milgrom Dodge =

American director and choreographer (born 1955)

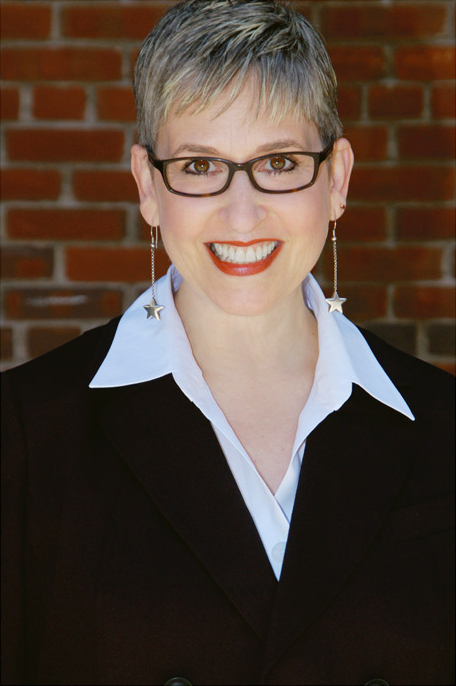
- Born: April 28, 1955 (age 71); Detroit, Michigan, U.S.
- Education: University of Michigan
- Occupation: Director-choreographer
- Years active: 45+
- Organization(s): Member of Stage Director's Guild and Lifetime Member of The Dramatist's Guild

Marcia Milgrom Dodge (born April 28, 1955) is an American theater director, choreographer, playwright and instructor. She is known for her work on the 2009 revival of the musical Ragtime, which she both directed and choreographed at the Kennedy Center in Washington DC, and then on Broadway in New York City. For this work, she won a Helen Hayes Award for Outstanding Director and was nominated for a Tony Award for Best Direction of a Musical.

== Career ==
Dodge got her BA in Speech Communications & Theatre from the University of Michigan in 1977, where she also pursued a minor in dance. She continued with postgraduate studies in jazz, tap and modern dance.

Dodge began her work Off-Broadway, where she choreographed Life is Not A Doris Day Movie (1982), Romance Language (1984), Romance in Hard Times (Public Theatre 1989), Closer Than Ever (1989), The Waves (1990), and The Loman Family Picnic (Manhattan Theatre Club 1993). She made her Broadway debut as associate choreographer for the Broadway musical High Society (1998).

In Washington, D.C., Dodge choreographed Sullivan and Gilbert at the Kennedy Center in 1983, directed Tell Me on a Sunday (2002) with Alice Ripley at the Kennedy Center, and choreographed On The Town (1989), Closer Than Ever, Merrily We Roll Along (1990), and Of Thee I Sing (1992) (Helen Hayes Award Nomination for Outstanding Choreography), all at the Arena Stage. She directed several productions of Ain't Misbehavin', first at Virginia Stage in 1991, followed by River Arts Repertory, Berkshire Theatre Festival, Cleveland Play House, Alabama Shakespeare Festival, Huntington Theatre, Pittsburgh Public Theatre, and the Philadelphia Drama Guild, receiving two Barrymore Award nominations for Outstanding Choreography and Best Musical.

Dodge has also directed and choreographed Radio Gals (John Houseman Theatre, 1996) and Seussical for TheatreWorksUSA (Lucille Lortel Theatre, 2007), receiving a Lucille Lortel Award nomination for Outstanding Choreography. She was also consulted for the physical theatre production Cookin' (Minetta Lane Theatre, 2004).

With the revival of Ragtime in 2009, she became the first woman to direct a major musical produced by the Kennedy Center. This production was nominated for six Helen Hayes Awards and won four, including an Outstanding Director award for Dodge. The Broadway transfer of this production went on to receive 7 Tony nominations in 2010, including one for Dodge for Best Direction.

At The Cape Playhouse, Dodge directed Deathtrap starring Robert Petkoff and Alison Fraser; Crimes of the Heart starring Sandy Duncan; Accomplice with Stephanie Zimbalist and Richard Kind; Angel Street starring David McCallum, Jean LeClerc, and Mia Dillon; and Murder on the Orient Express.

As resident director of the Phoenix Theatre Company at SUNY Purchase, Dodge directed and choreographed Ken Ludwig's Sullivan & Gilbert, starring George Grizzard, as well as High Spirits, The Crucifer of Blood, and There's One in Every Marriage.

Dodge has also directed and choreographed productions at the Music Circus in Sacramento, including The Unsinkable Molly Brown with Susan Egan, South Pacific (2006) with Kerry O'Malley, and Guys and Dolls (2009) with Gary Beach.

In 2011, Dodge directed a regional production of Chicago at Flat Rock Playhouse. She also directed and choreographed The Three Musketeers at the Fredericia Musicalteater in Denmark and How to Succeed in Business Without Really Trying at the Reprise Theatre Company in Los Angeles. Dodge has also directed and choreographed productions of Simeon's Gift (2007), The Who's Tommy (2006), Hair (2001), and Fit To Print (1999) at the Bay Street Theatre. At the Riverside Theatre in Vero Beach, Florida, she was the director for Dames at Sea, Anything Goes, Evita, and directed a performance of Blithe Spirit.

In 2012, Dodge directed and choreographed Hello, Dolly! at the Maltz Jupiter Theatre starring Vicki Lewis and Gary Beach. She directed Mark Brown's Around The World In 80 Days for the Pittsburgh Public Theatre, followed by a new production of The Music Man for the Glimmerglass Festival.

In 2021, Dodge directed a production of Disney's Beauty and the Beast at the Olney Theatre Center, which was met with a mostly positive reception from critics. Olney Theatre brought back the production in November 2022 after the 2021 run was canceled early due to the COVID-19 pandemic.

== Television ==
Dodge's television credits include appearing as a professional director in two episodes of the Disney+ show Encore!

== Writer ==
Dodge and her husband, Anthony Dodge, wrote their first play, the Edgar Award-nominated Sherlock Holmes & The West End Horror. Marcia Dodge directed three productions of the play from 2002 to 2005.

Dodge was the dramaturge for Quanah by Larry Gatlin and Anthony Dodge. Hats: The Musical, for which she wrote the book with Anthony Dodge, was presented by the Willows Theatre Company in Martinez, California from November 23, 2009 through January 10, 2010. Previous to this run, Hats also ran throughout 2006-2008 in several venues, including Harrah's in Las Vegas, the New Denver Civic Center, New Orleans, and Royal George Theatre in Chicago starring Melissa Manchester. Anthony Dodge wrote Free Burt Lancaster and Venus Flytrap, with Marcia directing readings of both plays at the Bay Street Theatre. She also directed a reading of Venus Flytrap at the LGBT+ Centre in NYC for Orange Hanky Productions in June 2008.

== Teaching ==
Dodge was on the faculty of Collaborative Arts Project 21 (CAP21) at NYU Tisch School of the Arts from 1996 to 2002. She has also been on the faculty of The American Musical and Dramatic Academy since 1996.
