= Sullivan and Gilbert =

- Music: Arthur Sullivan
- Lyrics: W. S. Gilbert
- Book: Ken Ludwig
- Premiere: 1983: Milford, New Hampshire
- Productions: 1983 Milford; 1988 Ottawa; 1988 Washington, D.C.

Sullivan and Gilbert is a jukebox musical by Ken Ludwig with music and lyrics by Gilbert and Sullivan. Sullivan and Gilbert features over 15 Gilbert and Sullivan songs. It examines a fictional day in 1890 when the Victorian era composer and dramatist, while embroiled in their 1890 "carpet quarrel", are requested by Queen Victoria to present a revue of songs from their operas on short notice.

The musical premiered in 1983 in Milford, New Hampshire, United States, and it has been revived several times in various places in North America.

== Production history ==
Sullivan and Gilbert premiered in 1983 in Milford, New Hampshire. It then had several more regional productions in the 1980s. In 1988 it was mounted at National Arts Centre of Canada, where it won the Ottawa Critics' Circle award for Best Play of the Year. It then was produced at the Kennedy Center opening in September 1988. The cast starred Fritz Weaver and Noel Harrison. It was directed by Leon Major and choreographed by Marcia Milgrom Dodge.

The play was produced by the Phoenix Theater Company at the Performing Arts Center of the State University of New York at Purchase in September 1993. The cast starred George Grizzard, Tim Jerome and Donna English. Subsequent productions followed.

This is not the only show about the Gilbert and Sullivan partnership. A show that premiered in 1938 on Broadway, Knights of Song, tells the story of the partnership, as do the play Dr Sullivan and Mr Gilbert (1993) and the musicals The Savoyards by Donald Madgwick (1971) and Tarantara Tarantara by Ian Taylor (1975). Films treating the duo are The Story of Gilbert and Sullivan (1951) and Topsy-Turvy (1999). In the short 1950 film, The Return of Gilbert and Sullivan, Gilbert and Sullivan contemporarily appear to protest the jazz treatment of their operas.

== Synopsis ==
In December 1890, near the end of their collaboration, and still estranged by their famous carpet quarrel, W. S. Gilbert and Sir Arthur Sullivan have neither seen nor spoken with each other in months. Now they must supervise a rehearsal for a revue of songs from their comic operas, a command performance for Queen Victoria at the Savoy Theatre. The underprepared show is set to open in about eight hours. Sullivan has been ill and has missed most of the rehearsals; he is in love with pretty Violet Russell, a young soprano of whom Gilbert disapproves. To make matters worse, Sullivan has invited Alfred, the Duke of Edinburgh (a son of the Queen), to join the cast. The eager duke can't sing, dance or remember his cues. When Gilbert finds out, he's furious. With a company of temperamental actors to manage, and their producer, Richard D'Oyly Carte, micromanaging everything, the two men have much to argue about. But their admiration for each other as collaborators and friends triumphs.

== Roles and 1988 cast ==
- W. S. Gilbert – Fritz Weaver
- Sir Arthur Sullivan – Noel Harrison
- Lucy Turner "Kitty" Gilbert – Kate Trotter
- Durward Lely – Daniel Marcus
- Courtice Pounds – Greg Bond
- Rutland Barrington – Philip Booth
- Sybil Grey – Lisa Vroman
- Jessie Bond – Leslie Toy
- Rosina Brandram – Christina James
- Richard D'Oyly Carte – Graham Harley
- Francois Cellier – Glenn Morle
- Violet Russell – Donna English
- Alfred, Duke of Edinburgh – Edward Duke
- George Grossmith – Walter Hudson
- Master Carpenter – Timothy Cruickshank
- Mistresses of Wardrobe – Susan Cuthbert and Alicia Jeffery
- Master of Properties – David Playfair
