= This Isn't What It Looks Like =

2010 children's novel by Pseudonymous Bosch

- The U.S. cover
- Author: Pseudonymous Bosch
- Illustrator: Gilbert Ford
- Cover artist: Gilbert Ford
- Language: English
- Series: Secret Series
- Genre: Mystery / Adventure / Fantasy
- Publisher: Little, Brown Books for Young Readers
- Publication date: 2010
- Publication place: United States, England, Ireland
- English publication date: September 2010
- Media type: 410
- Preceded by: This Book Is Not Good for You
- Followed by: You Have to Stop This

This Isn't What It Looks Like is a book by anonymous author Pseudonymous Bosch. It is the fourth book in the pentalogy "The Secret Series", and is the sequel to This Book Is Not Good for You, If You're Reading This, It's Too Late, and The Name of this Book is Secret. The book is based on the sense of sight as the other books are based on scent, sound, and taste. It acts as the continued part of This Book Is Not Good For You, starting just after Cass eats the magic "Time-Travel" chocolate and falls into a coma, searching for her ancestor, the Jester, to find out what the Secret of immortality is, as she recently became the new Secret-Keeper of the Terces Society. Meanwhile, Max-Ernest tries to save Cass with a special monocle, as the book centers around the sense of sight.

One of the most major secrets revealed in the story is that Pseudonymous Bosch may possibly be Max-Ernest, as the later described in the story that he saw his future self writing about him and Cass. As it is unlikely Bosch actually went on the adventures Max-Ernest went on with Cass, it is possible he simply based Max-Ernest on himself as a child. He also tells the story of when he nearly drowned in a jar of mayonnaise, describing how when he was a baby an old pea had gotten stuck in the folds of his thigh, causing him to scream and cry all the time. One day, however, at a restaurant, a waitress takes him to quiet him, discovers the pea, and washes him out in a very large jar of mayonnaise to get it out. However, he sinks to the bottom, and she is unable to get him out. However, the head chef rescues him, and squeezed the pea out of his thigh. Ever since then, Pseudonymous Bosch has had a morbid fear of mayonnaise, and a warm affinity for sous chefs.

== Plot ==
The story starts off with Cass awakening somewhere unknown to her, in an unknown time (she later finds she is in fact 500 years in the past), not knowing who she is, where she came from, or what she is doing. She sees a young boy stuck in a tree, and tries to rescue him, only to hear him repeatedly shouting the word "Goat!", evidently frightened. He runs down the road to his father, but neither of them even look at the girl. Confused, the girl walks up to a puddle, only to see that she has no reflection, realizing that she must be invisible, and that the boy was shouting "Ghost," not "Goat."

Meanwhile, Max-Ernest visits Cass in the PICU section of the hospital, where Cass lies in bed comatose. Max-Ernest, though evidently depressed over his friend comatose, (and the fact that the Tuning Fork won't help him create the antidote for Cass) with his only other friend Yo-Yoji away in Japan has overcome his "fear/allergy" of chocolate and eats several bars in a matter of seconds.

Back to Cass, she realizes she has somehow traveled in time and arrived in the Renaissance/Middle Ages. She also realizes she's invisible, not dead. At the streets, she meets a Seer, who can see her because she has something called the "Second Sight", obtained by an object called the Double Monocle (as this book centers around the sense of sight). She also does some fortune telling with a deck of tarot cards with Cass, showing her that the Ace of Wands card is upside down, meaning that an old wrong must be righted. The Seer gives a suggestion that maybe something has been stolen or she has stolen something. She then shows Cass the Fool card, with a picture of a fool, coincidentally the one that she saw while in the streets. When the Seer introduce her name as Clara or Cassandra, Cass's memories came back, making her remember about the Magician, the Jester, the Secret etc. She realizes she's on a mission to find the Secret, since she is the new Terces Society Secret Keeper. The Seer disappears but leaves Cass the Double Monocle.

Meanwhile, Max-Ernest goes to visit Pietro, who is playing Tarocchino with the circus crew. Pietro introduces the idea of tarot cards that has involvement in Cass's coma, which confuses Max-Ernest. Pietro explains that the Ace of Wands card is upside down, which refers to the fact that the Tuning Fork should be returned to their principal, Mrs. Johnson. He explains the Fork wants to be returned to its owner, so that is why it won't work. Lastly, Pietro tells Max-Ernest that he "must bring her home from her head" with mind reading.

Back to Cass, she experiments with the Double Monocle, which she finds out that she could see through walls. When a parade comes to the streets announcing that the Duke is to give gifts of riches to the King, Cass, taking advantage of her invisibility climbs onto the parade, believing that it'll lead her to the palace, where she could find the Jester. The parade is raided by Anastasia and her bandits, who returns the jewels and riches to the poor. She also discovers a lodestone that attracts a lot of metal which she keeps. Back at school, when Max-Ernest is about to return the Tuning Fork to Mrs. Johnson, he meets the new secretary Opal, who pranks him into not knocking on Mrs. Johnson's door, resulting in her scolding him. The principal is dressed like a queen, because of the upcoming Ren-Faire, a Renaissance themed fair. Max-Ernest sees that Mrs. Johnson is wearing the lodestone as a necklace, who she explains that her great great aunt Clara was wearing it. At the palace, Cass sees a man telling a creature to sleep in the dog kennels. The creature is Mr. Cabbage Face. When she calls out his name, the homunculus looks at her, meaning that he could see Cass. Cass realizes if Mr. Cabbage Face is here, then Lord Pharaoh, the founder of the Midnight Sun (evil alchemists who go murderous lengths to seek immortality) is too. Cass also realizes that in the Tale of Mr. Cabbage Face, the author got the place where the homunculus stayed in the palace wrong. It wasn't a pigsty, but a dog kennel.

Meanwhile, Benjamin Blake arrives from his old school, the New Promethean, completely changed. He is now wearing a tuxedo and owns the Double Monocle. He eats lunch with Max-Ernest, Daniel-not-Danielle and Glob in the Nuts Table. Benjamin reveals a note stuck on Max-Ernest's back, saying a strange message. At the kennels, Cass talks with the homunculus after giving him some leftover chicken as he was starving. When Cass gets the homunculus to speak a bit, the Jester arrives and carries own the conversation as notated in The Tale of Cabbage Face: A Gothic Tale. The Jester frees the homunculus before he is caught and sent to the dungeon, which is the place where the chamber pots are emptied. At Max-Ernest's house, Max-Ernest's parents announce that they are expecting a baby boy, overwhelming Max-Ernest.

At the dungeon, Lord Pharaoh suddenly arrives and bumps into an invisible Cass, causing the Double Monocle to fall off. Lord Pharaoh uses it and realizes the presence of Cass. Lord Pharaoh confiscates all of Cass's belongings (just a triangle of Senor Hugo's chocolate which he took to investigate) and throws Cass into a cell with the Jester. Cass reveals to the Jester that she is invisible and is his great great granddaughter. He first disregards it as madness but slowly believes her. At school, Max-Ernest decodes the message and reveals a troubling "LORD PHARAOH LIVES" (probably because Lord Pharaoh ate Cass's chocolate). At school, Amber invited Max-Ernest for a fortune telling session and when telling him that he is in love with Cass, Benjamin reads her mind and reveals to everyone that she lied, breaking her reputation. Benjamin reveals to Max-Ernest that he can mind read and agrees to read Cass's mind, like Pietro said. Max-Ernest would have to act an injury while Benjamin sneaks in.

Meanwhile, Anastasia frees everyone in the dungeon and flees to her campsite. At the hospital, the janitor notices Cass whispering "The Secret....what is the Secret..." but decides not to report it immediately. Then, Max-Ernest charges into the Emergency Room screaming because he has an "epileptic fit with the combined result of his allergy to vinyl and a cardiac arrest with the effects of white coat syndrome". But Max-Ernest's cover is blown, resulting in him to go back to Cass's room, just as Benjamin was about to see something. At home, Max-Ernest receives an Email from Yo-Yoji telling him that the school Benjamin went to is run by the Midnight Sun, Dr. L being principal. Max-Ernest sees why Benjamin was so eager to find out what was in Cass's mind. At the campsite, the bandits are ambushed by the soldiers. At school, Max-Ernest eavesdrop Benjamin and Amber talking. Amber was begging Benjamin to let her try the monocle. Eventually she lunges and grabs Benjamin's monocle, and sees through walls and almost catches Max-Ernest. Max-Ernest discovers that Benjamin has no mind reading powers, it's just his monocle. Benjamin tries to get the monocle back but Max-Ernest runs with it. He trips and Opal catches the monocle and reports Benjamin and Amber to the principal and sends Max-Ernest to the nurse's office. Opal leaves her purse there, giving Max-Ernest the chance to get the monocle. At the campsite, the other soldiers and their dogs search for Cass. The homunculus saves her by letting the dogs chase him. He also leaves Cass the treasure chest. In the treasure chest, Cass finds the lodestone and the Jester and Cass save them by throwing the a sword onto the lodestone the Jester uses it to play a trick where Cass throws a sword, instantly attracted to the magnet and making the soldiers beg for forgiveness, as they thought something supernatural had occurred. At the hospital, Max-Ernest could not find Cass as she has left the hospital because there is nothing the doctors could do. Max-Ernest uses the monocle to see himself in the mirror, revealing his future self eating massive amounts of chocolate and writing a book. It seems as if Pseudonymous Bosch is Max-Ernest because of his love of chocolate and being a writer.

At the campsite, Anastasia discovers the truth - that the Jester has befriended an invisible girl. Cass draws herself on a scroll with some clay. Anastasia leaves and the Jester promises Cass that he will find the Secret from Lord Pharaoh and make clues for her to find. At Cass's house, everything is mess and disorganized as Melanie is depressed. Melanie, Larry and Wayne go out, leaving Max-Ernest to look over Cass, still comatose. Max-Ernest makes a very very long talk to Cass, and plays Yo-Yoji's guitar tunes from his pc. But it turns out Yo-Yoji was actually in Cass's bedroom and was playing the chords live. Suddenly, the power goes out, revealing to be Benjamin who cut the power lines. Benjamin breaks into Cass's house and demands the monocle. Just as a fight was about to start, someone throws Yo-Yoji's guitar on Benjamin, knocking him out. It is revealed to be Cass who threw the guitar. Cass had awoken because of Max-Ernest's speech, Yo-Yoji's heavy metal and the sudden jolt of electric when Benjamin cut the power. Max-Ernest ties him up just in time when Melanie, Larry and Wayne return. Meanwhile, Max-Ernest's brother is born, and is named Paul-Clay. At the Ren-Faire, Glob live-blogs his famous food blog, typing down all kinds of events. But at 11:35 AM, Glob writes in his blog that when he went down to the river bank where there is smoke because he thought there was a barbecue there, he witnesses the Midnight Sun chanting the word "SECRET" over and over again near a fire with a very bright ball. He then sees Ms. Mauvais drink from a goblet and giving it to an invisible Lord Pharaoh to drink. The Midnight Sun catches Glob spying and he flees, before hiding in a cave under a hamburger-shaped rock. Back in the fair, the trio and a cured and normal dull Benjamin are at a camera obscura, viewing the fair. When they leave, Cass goes into a tent and the Seer has a conversation with her. When she comes out and goes back in again, there is no Seer inside, but a robot who tells fortunes. The robot gives her cards with things that the Seer said, but the words turn into normal things after Cass reads it. At the joust, an armored man called Sir Unknown (Lord Pharaoh) battles Yo-Yoji. the armored man tells the Master of Arms that he represents Mary Queen of Scots (Ms. Mauvais). Just then, Opal tells everyone the joust will stop because a student had participated in the joust and Yo-Yoji had to leave. As Mrs. Johnson bestows Unknown as winner, he snatches the lodestone from her neck, since he knows the Secret is on it. The rest of the Midnight Sun (disguised as guards) flee as Mrs. Johnson demands that the lodestone is returned to her or else the trio will be expelled. At the camera obscure, Opal reveals himself to be Owen, the accent changing spy of the Terces Society which explains why he told off Amber and Benjamin, not Max-Ernest and why he left the purse for Max-Ernest to rummage into. Then, at the Camera Obscura, Cass uses the monocle and sees that the Jester is there, since if she doesn't wear the monocle she couldn't see him. Suddenly, Daniel-not-Danielle calls Max-Ernest and tells him about Glob's emergency blog post. The trio rush to the riverbank mentioned in the blog post and while Max-Ernest and Yo-Yoji rescue Glob, whom eats a lot of Cass's special trail mix, Cass rushes to the mentioned fireplace, where she meets Sir Unknown, whom reveals himself to be Lord Pharaoh, invisible. Lord Pharaoh demands Cass to tell him how the lodestone works, but Cass distracts him by throwing the monocle and running away with the lodestone. Max-Ernest then hears Cass's calls of help and Yo-Yoji comes out, uses a branch from a tree to trip Lord Pharaoh over and hang him upside down. At Medieval Days Restaurant that night, Cass, Max-Ernest, Yo-Yoji, Paul-Clay and Benjamin have dinner. The trio try to solve the message said to be written on it by the Jester but fails. Later, at the fire station, Max-Ernest comes with Paul-Clay's toy which has magnetic powder on it. The lodestone attracts all of the powder and is covered by powder except a lining of silver that spells "AS ABOVE SO BELOW". Cass is disappointed with the result until the postman comes and gives a trunk to Cass. He explains that the trunk has been to all 7 continents in the world and the recipient is her. When the postman leaves, Cass finds out that the password combination to unlock the trunk is "AS SO" and unlocks it, revealing treasure from the chest Anastasia stole earlier. When she goes home, Melanie finds a scroll with a drawing of Cass on it, which was the one she drew 500 years ago, and she tells her there is a scrap of papyrus stuck on it. Cass snatches the papyrus, knowing the Secret is on it an rushes into her room to read it, but the papyrus is rapidly turning into dust. The story ends here to be continued in the next book.

== Characters ==
- Cass or Cassandra: The survivalist and main character, Cass is ready for any situation. She is well known for her big, pointed ears that turn red often, especially when she's embarrassed or mad.
- Max-Ernest: Cass's best friend and partner, Max-Ernest is shown to be a devoted friend; shown when he comes to see Cass every day when she's in the hospital. It is hinted that he is the younger version of the author of the series because of his new love of chocolate (he used to think he was allergic to it), and Max-Ernest seeing, with the monocle that he took when Benjamin Blake and Amber were fighting over it, what he thinks is a future version of himself writing the first book of the series.
- Yo-Yoji: Cass and Max-Ernest's Japanese classmate who spent one year in Japan. He took part in the Terces Society (a secret group) before Cass and Max-Ernest. He occasionally plays the guitar and knows musical notes, which is the only reason they found out the name for Mr. Cabbage Face from the Sound Prism in the previous book.
- The Jester (Hermes): The founder of the Terces Society, Hermes was at first The Jester of the King, but is an eventually jailed, with a bunch of mutts, for helping Cabbage Face free. After breaking out of jail with Cass he goes on to help Anastasia be freed from being captured. Sometime after Cass leaves the past, Hermes marries Anastasia, and learns the secret. Hermes is an Ancestor of Cass, A resemblance being the unusual ears they have.
- Anastasia: Leader of a band of bandits. Rescues the Jester and Cass from the dungeon. Marries the Jester later on.
- Lord Pharaoh: The founder of the Midnight Sun, Cass meets him when she's in the past.
- Cabbage Face: The invention of Lord Pharaoh, when Cass goes to the past she gives food to him and encourages to talk. Cass discovers that the author of the story got facts mixed up in "The Tale of Cabbage Face: A Gothic Tale"
- Glob: One of the members of the Nuts Table. He has a blog all about food, therefore he receives offers from various food related companies.
- Amber: The nicest girl in school and the third prettiest. She got her reputation ruined as the nicest girl when she lied to Max-Ernest when, with her "fortune telling" cards, she says Max-Ernest is in love with Cass but Benjamin reads her mind. She and her friend Veronica idolize the Skelton Sisters, who are secretly members of the Midnight Sun
- Benjamin: Part of the Midnight Sun. Trained with Dr. L in the institution called New Promethean. Comes back to use the monocle on Cass to find out the secret. At the end, he is finally back to his mumbling self.
- Daniel-not-Danielle: Another member of the Nuts Table
- Melanie: Cassandra's adoptive mother. She also goes by Mel.
- Grandpa Larry: Cass's grandfather, Larry is not her real grandfather. He is an adopted grandfather.
- Grandpa Wayne: Cass's grandfather, Wayne is not her real grandfather. He is an adopted grandfather.
- The bandits: a group of people, found in Cass's vision/coma and helps Anastasia steal goods and valuables from the more rich to give to the poor.
- The Seer (Clara or Cassandra): A fortune teller/ hand reader/ card reader/ reads Cass's cards.
- Mrs. Johnson: The principal at Max-Ernest, Yo-Yoji, and Cass's school. Mrs. Johnson is also a descendant of the Seer.
- The regal beagles: the dogs that belong to Lord Pharaoh
- The guards
- Veronica: Amber's best friend, but not the nicest
- Dr. L: Pietro's twin brother and also one of the antagonists along with Ms. Mauvais
- Ms. Mauvais: The first leader of the Midnight Sun

== Reception ==
School Library Journal's Caitlyn Walsh called This Isn't What It Looks Like "a witty mystery adventure [...] that is sure to keep listeners smiling".

AudioFile awarded the audiobook an Earphone Award, noting that "the ensemble cast expertly brings this story to life, and Joshua Swanson is superb as the first-person narrator. His delivery quickly pulls listeners into the story as if compatriots on a journey."
