= Chicago Shakespeare Theater =

Non-profit professional theater company in Chicago

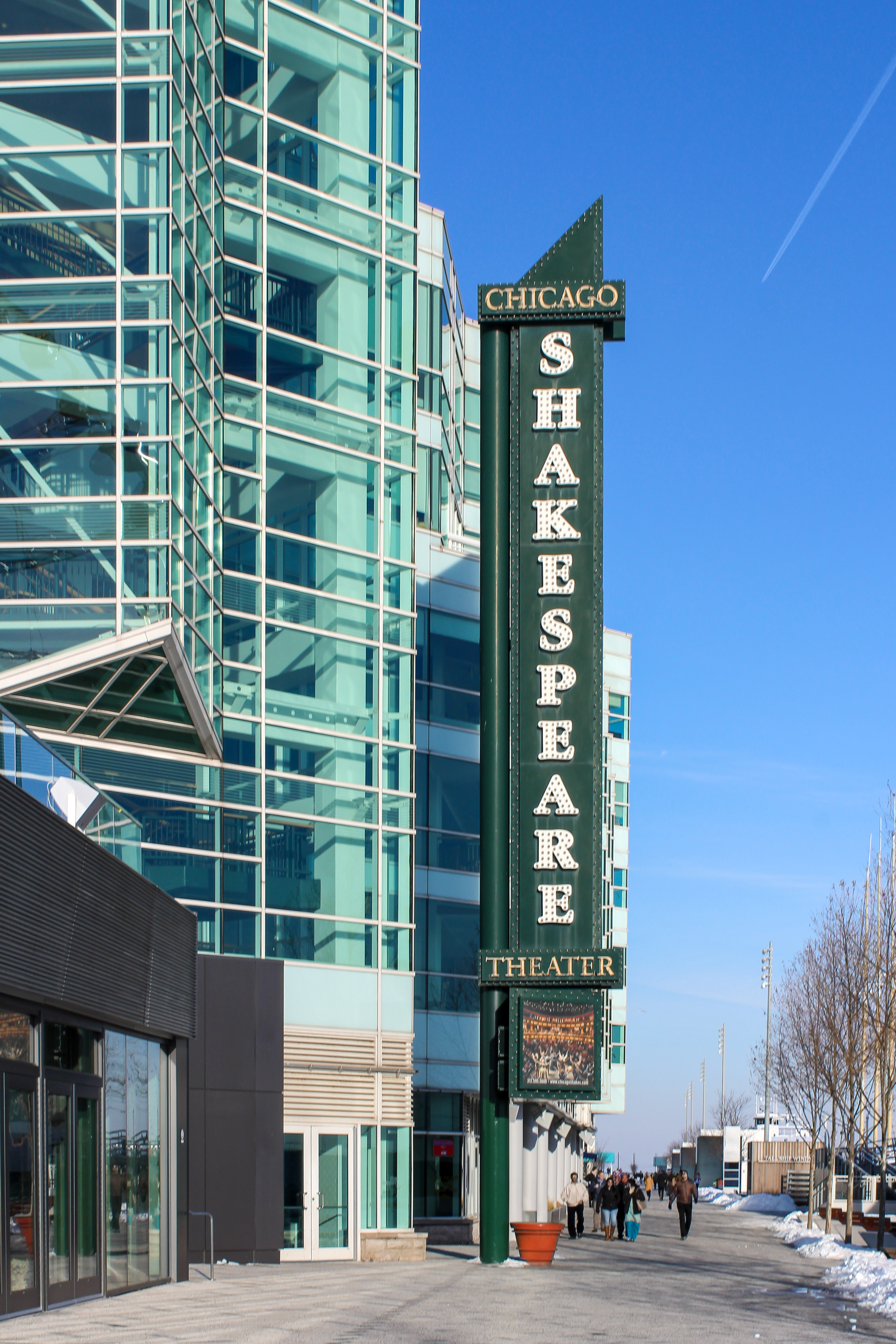
- The exterior of the theater building.
- Formation: 1986; 40 years ago
- Type: Theatre group
- Location: 800 East Grand Avenue, Chicago, IL 60611
- Coordinates: 41.8913°N 87.6058°W
- Website: www.chicagoshakes.com

Chicago Shakespeare Theater (CST) is a non-profit, professional theater company located at Navy Pier in Chicago, Illinois. Its more than six hundred annual performances performed 48 weeks of the year include its critically acclaimed Shakespeare series, its World's Stage touring productions, and youth education and family oriented programming. The theater had garnered 77 Joseph Jefferson awards and three Laurence Olivier Awards. In 2008, it was the winner of the Regional Theatre Tony Award.

Founded in 1986 in a pub, in 1999 the CST moved to a purpose-built seven-story theater complex on Navy Pier, where it has a main 500 seat space called the Courtyard, and the 200 seat Theater Upstairs. In 2017, it expanded on the pier into a connected three-theater-campus with the addition of The Yard, a flexible space that allows for versatile arrangements from 150 seats to 850 seats and from proscenium to in-the-round.

== Background ==
The company's founding artistic director Barbara Gaines formed the theater in 1986, when it began performances on the roof of the Red Lion Pub in the city's Lincoln Park neighborhood. In 1999, the company received permission to build its permanent home: a two-venue facility at Navy Pier.

Productions at the theater include works from the Shakespearean canon as well as other plays and musicals. In addition to its own original productions, the Chicago Shakespeare Theater also hosts touring productions from other theater companies.

Chicago Shakespeare Theater is part of Theatre Communications Group (TCG), the Shakespeare Theatre Association of America (STAA) and National Alliance for Musical Theatre (NAMT) and the National Council of Teachers of English (NCTE).

== History ==
Chicago Shakespeare Theater was founded as the Chicago Shakespeare Workshop by former Artistic Director Barbara Gaines in 1986, a name which was changed a year later to the Chicago Shakespeare Repertory and finally in 1999 to Chicago Shakespeare Theater. It performed its first twelve seasons in residency at the Ruth Page Theater, where it performed titles ranging from better-known Shakespeare plays such as Hamlet and King Lear as well as lesser-known titles such as Troilus and Cressida and Timon of Athens. Although the theater was critically lauded for its innovative approach to classic works, it was limited by the age and spatial restrictions of the Ruth Page Theater and began looking for a new performance space in the late 1990s.

In 1997, CST announced its plans to move from the Ruth Page to a new facility located at Navy Pier, a place better known for its family attractions and in fact the most popular tourist attraction in the Midwest. The move was accompanied by a public relations blitz, which even involved Mayor Richard M. Daley naming April 23, 1997, as Shakespeare Repertory Day. The company began a large-scale capital campaign to finance the move, and opened its 1999–2000 season in its new, state-of-the-art facility. Since then, CST has grown from the third-largest theater company in Chicago to the third-largest in the entire Midwest, at a rate 400% faster than the industry growth trend.

== Facilities ==
Chicago Shakespeare Theater has, since October 1999, been in residence in a purpose built, seven-story, 75,000-square-metre (810,000 sq ft) facility at Chicago's Navy Pier, which houses its box office, administrative offices, and performance venues. The first performance at this facility was Eric Idle reading from his novel The Road to Mars.

The 510-seat Courtyard Theater, which is the primary production venue for CST, has a thrust stage and deep proscenium. A second theater, the 200-seat black box "Upstairs" space, is devoted to smaller but still-popular productions such as The Second City's Romeo and Juliet Musical: The People Vs. Friar Laurence, The Man Who Killed Romeo and Juliet.

== Awards ==
- 2016 production of The Tempest received the 2016 Joseph Jefferson Award

== World Premieres ==
Chicago Shakespeare Theater has produced and premiered numerous original works across a range of theatrical forms—from book musicals to devised dance-theater. The following is a list of notable world premieres at CST:

- The Notebook (2022) – music and lyrics by Ingrid Michaelson, book by Bekah Brunstetter, directed by Michael Greif and Schele Williams.
- Illinoise (2024) – conceived by Justin Peck and Jackie Sibblies Drury, directed and choreographed by Peck, featuring the music of Sufjan Stevens.
- Judgment Day (2024) – written by Rob Ulin, directed by Moritz von Stuelpnagel, starring Jason Alexander.
- Billie Jean (2025) – written by Lauren Gunderson, based on the life of tennis legend Billie Jean King.
- Rome Sweet Rome (2025) – a hip-hop adaptation of Shakespeare's Julius Caesar by the Q Brothers Collective.
- Fault (2026) - directed by Jason Alexander and written by Scooter Pietsch, starring Enrico Colantoni, Rebecca Spence, and Nick Marini. Teri Hatcher was originally slated for the show, but withdrew from the production for an unknown reason.

In addition, Chicago Shakespeare Theater has produced several notable North American premieres:

- Six (2018) - a musical about the six wives of King Henry VIII, which later went to Broadway
- 42 Balloons (2025) - a musical adaptation of Lawnchair Larry
- Paranormal Activity (2025) - a stage play adaptation of the horror film of the same name
- Brokeback Mountain (2026) - a play inspired by the film of the same name, first premiering in London
