= The Secret Series =

Book series by Pseudonymous Bosch

- Boxed set
- The Name of this Book is Secret (2007); If You're Reading This, It's Too Late (2008); This Book Is Not Good for You (2009); This Isn't What It Looks Like (2010); You Have to Stop This (2011)
- Author: Pseudonymous Bosch
- Country: United States
- Language: English
- Genre: Fantasy, Adventure
- Publisher: Little, Brown Books
- Published: 2007–2011
- Media type: Print (hardback & paperback); E-book; Audio CD
- No. of books: 5
- Website: http://www.thesecretseries.com/

The Secret Series is a series of 'secret'-themed fantasy adventure novels written by Pseudonymous Bosch (Raphael Simon). The series centers on three middle school children: Cass, Max-Ernest, and Yo-Yoji; and their adventures as members of the Terces Society, a group that seeks to prevent a mysterious "Secret" from being discovered by the villainous organization of alchemists, the Midnight Sun.

The Secret Series is inspired by Lemony Snicket's A Series of Unfortunate Events and targeted at middle-school-aged readers.

As of 2021, a film adaptation is in development.

== Association with the five senses ==
Each book targets one of the five senses. Additionally, the plot of each book contains an item or object that relates to the sense the book surrounds.

Each book with its associated sense and sense-related object
Book	Sense	Item/object
Book 1: The Name of this Book is Secret	Smell	Symphony of Smells
Book 2: If You're Reading This, It's Too Late	Hearing	Sound Prism
Book 3: This Book Is Not Good for You	Taste	Tuning Fork
Book 4: This Isn't What It Looks Like	Sight	'Double monocle'
Book 5: You Have To Stop This	Touch	'Ring of Thoth'
