= Barbara Gaines (director) =

American theatre director, impresario, and actress

Barbara Gaines is an American theatre director, impresario, and actress. She is the founder and former artistic director of the Chicago Shakespeare Theater.

== Life and career ==
Gaines grew up in the suburbs of New York City and is the daughter of a film director. After graduating from Northwestern University in 1968, she worked as an actress in New York City and Chicago. She also taught Shakespeare classes for actors in Chicago before founding the Chicago Shakespeare Theater (CST) in 1986. With the company she has directed more than 30 plays by William Shakespeare; productions which have garnered more than 35 Joseph Jefferson Awards (3 times for Gaines personally as Best Director) and 3 Laurence Olivier Awards. In 2008, the company was awarded the prestigious Regional Theatre Tony Award.

She directed the Lyric Opera of Chicago's 2010 production of Giuseppe Verdi's Macbeth.

In 2016, Gaines adapted and directed Tug of War, a 2-part series based on Shakespeare's history plays.

Outside of her work with the Chicago Shakespeare Theater, Gaines is currently a member of the Shakespearean Council for the Globe Theatre in London. She has also served on panels for the National Endowment for the Arts, is a member of Chicago's Cultural Affairs Advisory Board, and is a Life Trustee of Northwestern University.

== Other awards ==
In 2005, she was named an honorary Officer of the Order of the British Empire.

Her other honours include honorary doctorates from Dominican University and Lake Forest College, the Spirit of Loyola Award from Loyola University Chicago, and the Public Humanities Award from the Illinois Humanities Council.
