= If You're Reading This, It's Too Late (novel) =

Book by Pseudonymous Bosch

- First edition (US)
- Author: Pseudonymous Bosch
- Language: English
- Series: The Secret Series
- Genre: Mystery / Adventure
- Publisher: Little, Brown Books for Young Readers
- Publication date: 2008
- Publication place: United States
- Media type: Hardcover
- Pages: 385
- ISBN: 0-7460-9740-9
- Preceded by: The Name of This Book is Secret
- Followed by: This Book Is Not Good for You

If You're Reading This, It's Too Late is the sequel to The Name of this Book is Secret in The Secret Series by Raphael Simon, writing as Pseudonymous Bosch. It was released in October 2008 and features the same characters as the first book.

== Plot ==
For 500 years, the secret society of the Midnight Sun has been waiting for the homunculus, the man-made man, to rise, and now Dr. L and Ms. Mauvais are going to throw Cass and Max-Ernest to the sharks unless they tell them where he resides. After going on an excursion with their science teacher, the two are tricked by Dr. L after receiving a note from Pietro saying he will meet them on a ship, from which they barely escaped. After finding out their teacher was actually Owen, the accent changing member of the Terces Society, they are introduced to the great magician himself, Pietro, who gives them a mission. The mission is to find the homunculus before the Midnight Sun does. Max-Ernest also finds out that 'Terces' is "secret" backwards, and Cass gets grounded when she returns home, because she was missing for too long. While on the Midnight Sun ship, Cass and Max-Ernest discover a strange ball (also called the sound prism), which enables her to hear all types of sounds by putting it to her ear and makes wonderful music when thrown in the air carefully. Cass also discovers a birth certificate. The name is unrecognizable, but has the same name written on it as her, thus making Cass wonder if she was the wrong girl that the Terces Society wanted. She ignores it, even though it pains her, and continues her mission. Later, Cass finds out she is really adopted and was delivered in a box on her grandfathers' doorstep, and that she was the girl written on the birth certificate.

This time teaming up with a new classmate named Yoji (who prefers to be called Yo-Yoji), the three need to escape the grasp of their parents, and find the alchemist's grave. Cass convinces her grandparents to take her, Max-Ernest, and Yo-Yoji camping to find the homunculus. When they find the homunculus, they take it back to Terces, but it runs away when he finds out they don't have good food. Meanwhile, Amber gets to meet the oddly creepy Skelton Sisters, who are in cahoots with Midnight Sun, and they ask her to do something for them. Later that night, Amber is hidden in Cass' bushes, and Cass hears noises. She goes outside and plays the Sound Prism, thinking it's Mr. Cabbage Face. Amber records the song from the sound prism, which attracts the homunculus, and gives it to the Skelton Sisters. They play it at a concert, and end up trapping the homunculus and Cass. They end up back near Whisper Lake, where they went camping. The Midnight Sun took there because Lord Pharaoh's, the nasty man who created Mr. Cabbage Face, the homunculus, grave is there, and with it, all of his alchemist things, which is what Ms. Mauvais and Dr. L want in order to help their mission in receiving immortality. The Midnight Sun and Terces Society members engage in combat because the Midnight Sun had captured Cass and Mr. Cabbage Face, in the while Max-Ernest and Yo-Yoji are up on a mountain, with the Sound Prism and a whip. Their plan is to create a sonic boom with it, and make the mountain avalanche onto the Midnight Sun and seal the coffin in the ground. When a huge boulder falls off the mountain from the sonic boom, Cass and Mr. Cabbage Face, now freed, are trying their own efforts to put the coffin back in the grave, but Mr. Cabbage Face screams to Cass to get out of the way because the boulder was heading towards her. He pushes her out of the way, and Mr. Cabbage Face gets crushed into the ground with the coffin. The homunculus dies, due to being crushed, and is sealed with his maker in that grave forever. Midnight Sun members disperse, not before Dr. L can have a nice chat (surprisingly) with his brother/old friend. At the end, Max-Ernest, Cass and Yo-Yoji take the Oath of Terces, created by the Jester, the homunculus' only friend 500 years ago, and Cass' real great, great, great, great... great grandfather.
