= Josh Bazell =

American writer and doctor

- Born: Joshua Arneas Bazell; 1970 (age 55–56)
- Education: Brown University (BA); Columbia University (MD); University of California, San Francisco
- Occupations: Writer; doctor
- Parent(s): Robert Bazell; Ilene Tanz Gordon

Joshua Arneas Bazell (born 1970) is an American writer and medical doctor.

Bazell graduated from Brown University with a B.A. in English Literature. He has an M.D. from Columbia University and did his medical residency at the University of California, San Francisco.

== Private life ==
Bazell's father is Robert Bazell, chief science and health correspondent for NBC News. His mother is Ilene Tanz Gordon. His sister Rebecca Bazell is an illustrator and writer.

In August 1982, Josh Bazell, then 12 years of age, and his family were left adrift at sea in a 14-foot (4.3-metre) aluminum boat when it ran out of fuel 2 miles (3.2 kilometres) from Grand Cayman island. Josh's father swam to shore to summon help but on returning, the boat with Margot (the step-mother), Rebecca and Josh aboard, had drifted away and could not be found. The search involved many private vessels, four military aircraft and a Coast Guard cutter. In the afternoon of the fourth day the Japanese tanker Arabia Addas happened upon the boat, which had drifted to a position 40 miles (64 km) from Grand Cayman. The family were re-united that night aboard the tanker. The family were afterwards described as "in absolutely perfect condition - a bit skinny and suntanned".

== Bibliography ==
- Beat the Reaper (2009)
- Wild Thing (2012)
