= Pseudonymous Bosch =

American author

Raphael Simon
- Born: October 25, 1967 (age 59)
- Partner: Phillip de Leon
- Children: 2
- Parent: Roger L. Simon
- Writing career
- Pen name: Pseudonymous Bosch
- Website: www.pseudonymousbosch.com

Pseudonymous Bosch (/ˈsuːdənɪməs bɒʃ, bɔːʃ, bɔːs/) is the pen name of Raphael Simon (born October 25, 1967), the author of The Secret Series and The Bad Books series of fiction books, as well as The Unbelievable Oliver chapter book mysteries and two stand-alone titles. He has written 12 books, each widely read.

== Personal life ==
Simon was born on October 25, 1967, to writers Dyanne Asimow and Roger L. Simon. (Note: Simon's date of birth comes from the author stating how his first professional essay was published one day after his 17th birthday. According to Simon's official essay bibliography, the piece in question, “Hollywood Parents in Transit,” first appeared in the Los Angeles Reader on October 26, 1984. Based on this, Simon's date of birth is 17 years and 1 day before October 26, 1984, which makes his date of birth October 25, 1967.) He was born in Los Angeles County, California. His brother, Jesse, is a visual artist. He also has a significantly younger half-sister, Madeleine, from his father's third marriage.

Simon attended Yale, where he came out as gay when he was 20 years old. Later he earned an MA in Comparative Literature from UC Irvine. He went on to teach courses about detective fiction, composition, and fiction for young readers at various colleges and universities in California. He currently lives in Pasadena, California, with his husband, Phillip de Leon. They have twin children, who were born in 2007.

== Professional career ==
Bosch had long been suspected to be the author Raphael Simon, although Bosch disputed this until he revealed himself as Simon in a May 8, 2016, editorial in The New York Times.

The pseudonym is a play on that of the artist Hieronymus Bosch. It also may play off the fictional Los Angeles detective, Hieronymous "Harry" Bosch, also named after the artist, created by the author Michael Connelly, and who has appeared in several of his novels starting in 1992.

Prior to becoming a novelist, Simon worked as a screenwriter, including as a staff writer on the Nickelodeon series Rocket Power. He started writing his first novel, The Name of this Book Is Secret, as a series of letters to a fourth-grader. It was published in 2007, and was nominated for an Edgar Allan Poe award for best juvenile mystery. A sequel followed in 2008: If You're Reading This It's Too Late. Eventually there would be five titles in the Secret Series. The New York Times bestselling series has sold millions of copies and has been translated into many languages.

In 2013, Bosch published Write This Book!, a do it yourself book; he calls it "a book that readers will write for me". Bosch elaborated in an interview with Wired stating that "it is a kind of half-written, guided mystery. Parts of it are going to be multiple choice, choose-your-own adventure, parts of it will be more like Mad Libs, and some silly stuff".

The following year, Bosch returned readers to the world of the Secret Series in Bad Magic, the first novel in what became the Bad Books trilogy.

On May 14, 2019, Bosch published The Unbelievable Oliver and the Four Jokers, with illustrations by Shane Pangburn. The book is about an eight year-old boy who longs to be a professional magician. A followup, The Unbelievable Oliver and the Sawed-in-Half Dads, was released on May 12, 2020. In 2021, Bosch published The Anti-Book, his first book under his real name Raphael Simon.

== Bibliography ==
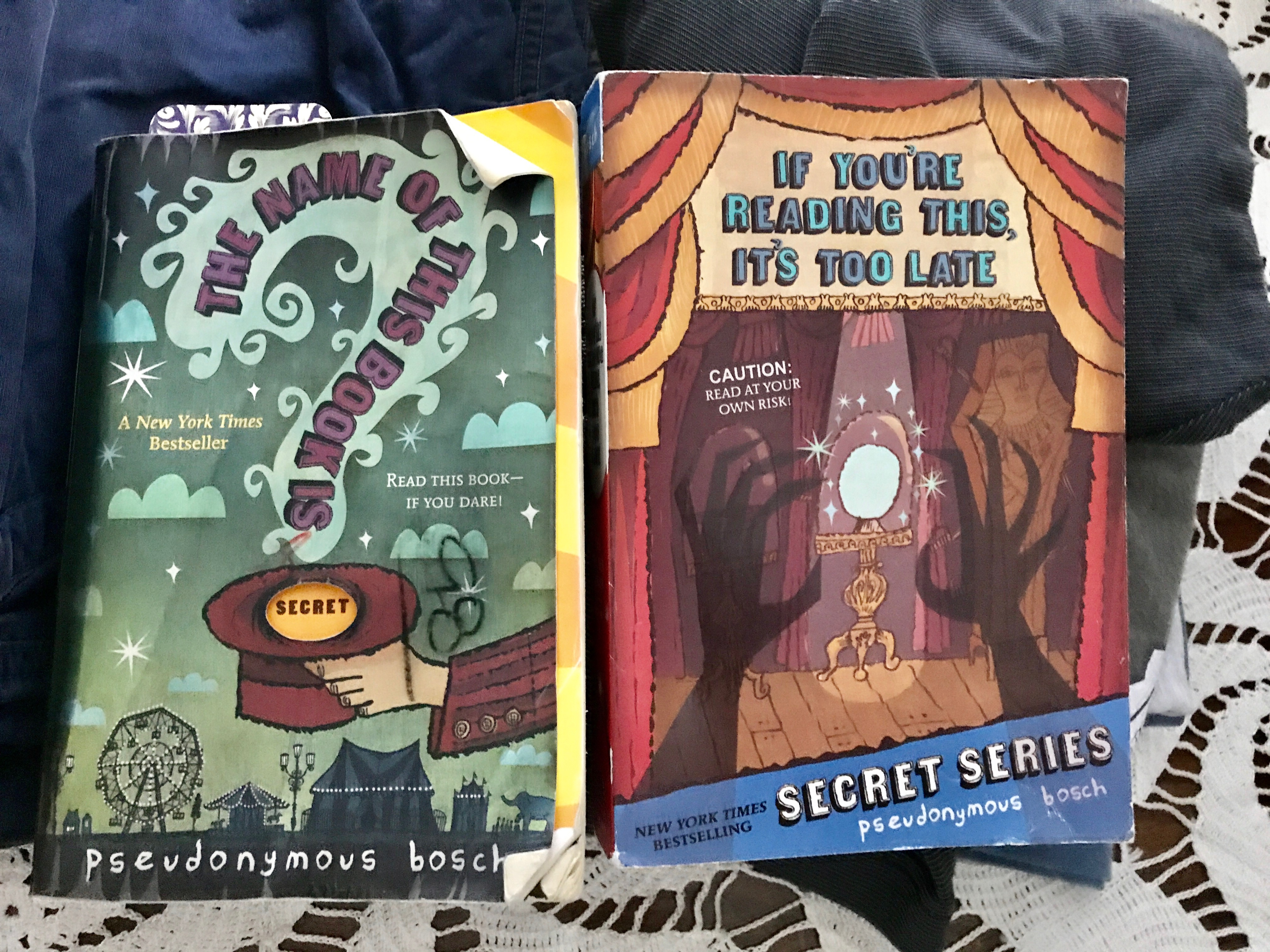
The first two novels of the "Secret Series" are pictured: "The Name of This Book is Secret" and "If You're Reading This, It's Too Late."

=== As Pseudonymous Bosch ===
==== The Secret Series ====
- The Name of This Book is Secret (October 1, 2007)
- If You're Reading This it's Too Late (October 1, 2008)
- This Book Is Not Good for You (September 1, 2009)
- This Isn't What It Looks Like (September 21, 2010)
- You Have to Stop This (September 20, 2011)

==== The Bad Books ====
- Bad Magic (2014) centers around a character who was first introduced as Max-Ernest's little brother, Paul-Clay, in the Secret Series.
- Bad Luck (2016)
- Bad News (January 2017)

==== The Unbelievable Oliver ====
- The Unbelievable Oliver and the Four Jokers (2019, illustrated by Shane Pangburn)
- The Unbelievable Oliver and the Sawed in Half Dads (2020, illustrated by Shane Pangburn)

==== Standalone ====
- Write This Book (2013) is a do-it-yourself mystery.

=== As Raphael Simon ===
- The Anti-Book (2021)
