= Beat the Reaper (novel) =

2009 crime novel by Josh Bazell

- Author: Josh Bazell
- Genre: Crime fiction
- Publisher: Little, Brown and Company
- Publication date: January 7, 2009
- ISBN: 978-0-316-03222-3

Beat the Reaper is a 2009 crime novel, the debut novel of author/physician Josh Bazell.

== Plot ==
The plot, written in first-person and alternating between present-day scenes and flashbacks, concerns Peter Brown, a medical resident in the Federal Witness Protection Program.

In the flashback chapters Brown narrates how, under his real name of Pietro Brnwa, he fell in with a Mafia family and became a hitman after avenging the deaths of his grandparents who had survived the Nazi death camp Auschwitz. In the present, Brown must help save the life of a mobster who knew him as Brnwa, lest the patient reveal Brnwa/Brown's location to the local crime boss.

== Reception ==
Beat the Reaper received reviews from Bloomberg News, Booklist, The Guardian,Kirkus Reviews, Publishers Weekly, and The Washington Post.

In 2010, Beat the Reaper was shortlisted for the Barry Award for Best First Novel.

== Television series adaptation ==
In December 2025, Apple TV ordered a series adaptation with Sam Catlin serving as showrunner and executive producer. Will Poulter is set to star as Dr. Peter Brown and executive produce the series.
