= This Book Is Not Good for You =

2009 children's novel by Pseudonymous Bosch

- US cover
- Author: Pseudonymous Bosch
- Illustrator: Gilbert Ford
- Cover artist: Gilbert Ford
- Language: English
- Series: Secret Series
- Genre: Mystery, Adventure, Fantasy
- Publisher: Little, Brown Books for Young Readers
- Publication date: 2009
- Publication place: United States, England, Ireland
- English publication date: September 2009
- Media type: Hardcover
- Pages: 394
- Preceded by: If You're Reading This, It's Too Late
- Followed by: This Isn't What It Looks Like

This Book Is Not Good for You is a book by anonymous author Pseudonymous Bosch. It is part of the "Secret Series", a pentalogy of books written by Bosch, and is the sequel to The Name of This Book is Secret and If You're Reading This, It's Too Late. In the story, a famous chef named Señor Hugo captures Cass's mother in order to get Cass to bring him the legendary Tuning Fork for the Midnight Sun (the society whose goal is to find the Secret and be able to live forever), in hope that it will help the members achieve immortality.

== Plot ==
The novel starts out with an African girl named Simone, who tastes a piece of chocolate for the Midnight Sun (as the book centers around the sense of taste, like the first novel, which centers around scent, and the second, which centers around the sense of sound). It is noted that she is a Supertaster, and is able to distinguish between almost any food, no matter how similar they are. Immediately after tasting the chocolate, she blacks out.

Meanwhile, Max-Ernest, Yo-Yoji and Cass, three members of the Terces Society and the three protagonists of the series, are searching for the box in which the letter was found when she was a baby, as she earlier found out she was adopted and wants to find out more about who she is. While they search, they find a box filled with magazines that was dropped off at the front door of Cass's grandfathers' old, abandoned fire station, where the grandfathers live. Max-Ernest points out a magazine with a picture of the Skelton Sisters on the cover, the teen pop stars who were known by the two collaborators as being members of the Midnight Sun. Knowing this, the kids become suspicious of what they are doing, and discover that they are with Ms. Mauvais, the French woman who is one of the most evil leaders of the Midnight Sun, and that they have established headquarters in the country Côte d'Ivoire in Africa, where they take care of orphans and work on a chocolate plantation. Cass and Max-Ernest head to the old circus, where the Terces Society (which consists of Pietro Bergamo, the retired magician whose brother, Luciano, otherwise known as Dr. L, was captured by Ms. Mauvais and is now one of the leaders of the Midnight Sun; Mr. Wallace, an accountant who works as the society's archivist; Lily Wei, a Chinese violinist who escaped the Midnight Sun and is now the head of physical defense and martial arts, and Owen, an actor who appears as many different people in the series and acts as somewhat like a spy for the society) to tell Pietro and the others where the Midnight Sun is hiding. Mr. Wallace tells them that he thinks the legendary Tuning Fork is involved in the spa's plan with chocolate.

Later, Cass and her mother, Melanie, or "Mel" for short, sign up for a cooking class run by the famous blind chef, Señor Hugo. After bringing up the subject of the Tuning Fork, Cass is invited to Hugo's famous restaurant with her mother, Max-Ernest, and other friend, Yoji, or "Yo-Yoji." At the restaurant, the kids and Mel discover that it is extremely dark to the point where no one can see anything, since Hugo wants the diners' other senses, especially taste, to be heightened during their meal. After trying many different foods, Cass sees that her mother is gone. Outside, she reads the note given to her by the waiter from Señor Hugo, which demands the Tuning Fork in return for her mother.

Later at the fire station, Cass and her friends search for the Tuning Fork, as they were told earlier by Mr. Wallace that by now the Fork, which was originally possessed by the Aztec boy "Caca Boy", would probably have ended up in a junk shop, and assumed that the junk shop he was talking about could only be Cass's grandfather's home. While searching, Cass finds the box in which she was dropped off by Mr. Wallace, and then sees on a television that the kids' principal, Mrs. Johnson, is in possession of the Tuning Fork. The trio heads to her house to her house to find out that she is completely opposite of what she says in school, and is gambling, smoking and not recycling. They blackmail her into giving them the Fork. Cass then gives Señor Hugo the Fork at her house, finding out that he is in fact part of the Midnight Sun, and will not give her back her mother as she told her friends what he had done, when she had been told not to.

Meanwhile, the girl, Simone, awakes from her faint and finds a woman named Melanie in her cell. Mel gives her comfort and tells her that she has a daughter like her, and gives Simone comfort, telling her that her parents must have loved her and thought it best to send her to the plantation. Mel is then called to the Tasting Room, and Simone warns her not to eat any chocolate.

At Yo-Yoji's house, Cass, Max-Ernest, and Yo-Yoji investigate the pictures of the Midnight Sun at the plantation in the magazine, looking for clues. They discover that they are at a zoo, since there was a "don't feed" sign and an American bird and are in fact not in Africa, but are located inside an artificial rainforest park somewhere in the United States (as the series is meant to be secret, the author states that he cannot identify the exact place in the country in which the park is located). After taking a train to the park, the kids camp out there (with the trio nearly eaten by a lion) and later journey through the rainforest, locating the plantation with the help of a Capuchin monkey.

Hiding in the cacao trees on the plantation, the kids witness Ms. Mauvais herself talking to an elderly man, Itamar, who made a brief appearance in the first book, and dies a few days later. They also discover that Ms. Mauvais' first name is "Antoinette." The trio then find a building called the "Pavilion," where the Tasting Room is located (the very place in which Simone tasted chocolate for the Midnight Sun). The kids find three pieces of chocolate on a table, which is in fact a trap placed by the Midnight Sun. Cass and Yo-Yoji eat a piece each, though Max-Ernest refrains from eating due to his assumption of being allergic to chocolate.

As Max-Ernest watches them fall into trances, Cass "dreams" about her and the Jester—a man from whom Cass is descended, and is the founder of the Terces Society—and their conversation about the Secret. When Cass wakes up, the three Midnight Sun members, Ms. Mauvais, Dr. L, and Señor Hugo demand her to tell them the Secret, as they believe the chocolate took her back in time to the Jester and was told the Secret. Cass truthfully admits that she does not remember the Secret, and they take her away to Simone's cell, which is right next to her mother's. Yo-Yoji, meanwhile, has disappeared, and Max-Ernest is the only one who can rescue the two kids.

Max-Ernest eventually catches up with Yo-Yoji. Since Yo-Yoji fell into a trance that has him believing he is an ancient Samurai warrior, Max-Ernest was able to control him and command him to rescue Cass, her mother, and Simone. The kids go to get back the Tuning Fork from Hugo, rescue the orphans (who were really made slaves by the Midnight Sun), and finally escape the Midnight Sun. Later at Cass's house, Cass and Max-Ernest use the Tuning Fork to revive Yo-Yoji back to his normal self.

The story ends with Cass being told by Pietro that she is the new Secret-Keeper, Max-Ernest tells Cass his parents are back together again and begins to like chocolate. Then eating the piece of chocolate Hugo had made for her, Cass falling into yet another trance. The story continues in the sequel, This Isn't What It Looks Like, with Cass in a coma as the piece of chocolate was exceptionally strong, and Max-Ernest trying to rescue her.

== Characters ==
- Cass: Cassandra, or "Cass" for short, is the main protagonist of all the books. A smart, sarcastic, 12-year-old adopted girl (as discovered in the second book, If You're Reading This, It's Too Late), Cass embarks on adventures with Max-Ernest and Yo-Yoji to stop the Midnight Sun and its sinister plans to achieve immortality. She is descended from the Jester, who was one of the first to obtain the knowledge of the Secret, and was the founder of the Terces Society (the secret society that protects the Secret from being discovered by anyone, especially the Midnight Sun). She is a survivalist, and is always prepared for natural disasters, such as hurricanes, earthquakes, and tornadoes.
- Max-Ernest: Max-Ernest is a boy with several disorders, especially with the problem of talking too much. He wants to be a stand-up comedian and magician when he grows up. Max-Ernest is a very logical person, and is a bit obsessive compulsive. His parents are divorced due to not agreeing on a name; they ended up giving him both the names they each wanted when he was born. He is friends with Cass and Yo-Yoji, and is part of the Terces Society.
- Yo-Yoji: Yoji, or "Yo-Yoji," is a boy who had lived in Japan for about a year. It is noted that his ancestors may have been Japanese, as the chocolate he ate showed him acting as one of his ancestors, a samurai. His teacher is Lily Wei, who helps him practice the violin, though he is more interested in his rock band that he was in back in Japan. He is also part of the Terces Society.
- Melanie: Melanie, or "Mel," for short, is Cass's adoptive mother. She was once a lonely, single woman, wanting a baby, resulting in her adopting Cass when the later appeared on Larry and Wayne's doorstep. She was kidnapped by Señor Hugo in the book so that Cass would give him the Tuning Fork in return for her mother.
- Larry and Wayne: These two men are Cass's adoptive grandparents. They are obsessed with collecting old, broken objects, and store everything in their home, which is an abandoned fire station. Larry was once Mel's old high school teacher. Mr. Wallace was once their accountant.
- Mr. Wallace: William Wilton Wallace III is the Terces Society's archivist. An elderly, irritable man, Mr. Wallace was the person who left Cass with her grandparents.
- Pietro Bergamo: Pietro Bergamo is the current leader of the Terces Society. His background is revealed in the first book, The Name of this Book is Secret, when he was a major character, being supposedly murdered by the Midnight Sun in an attempt to obtain his journal, which may contain the Secret. He and Luciano, or "Dr. L," are Italian twin brothers who were separated from their parents years ago and joined a circus. There they became amazing magicians, with the help of the fact that they both had synesthesia, or a confusion of the senses, which was also a major theme of the first book. Dr. L was kidnapped by Ms. Mauvais when the two were young, and is now her partner in leading the Midnight Sun. Pietro and Luciano's hatred for each other is now as strong as their love for each other once was. Now retired, Pietro gives Cass, Max-Ernest, and Yo-Yoji advice on their missions.
- Lily Wei: Lily Wei, or Master Wei, is a Chinese woman in the Terces Society who was once kidnapped by Ms. Mauvais, like Dr. L. It is noted in the first book, when she was first mentioned, that she had synthesia, the main reason people were being kidnapped by Ms. Mauvais and the Midnight Sun. She teaches Yo-Yoji the violin, as she used to play in front of audiences when she was young, and is also the head of physical defense in the Terces Society—in fact, she even keeps a sword inside her violin bow.
- Señor Hugo: Hugo is a famous chef who is secretly part of the Midnight Sun. He kidnapped Melanie, Cass's adoptive mother, for ransom in order for Cass to give him the Tuning Fork. He makes the chocolate that brings Cass and Yo-Yoji back in time.
- Ms. Mauvais and Dr. L: The two leaders of the Midnight Sun, Ms. Antoinette Mauvais and Luciano Bergamo, or "Dr. L," are alchemists who are searching for the Secret to immortality. Dr. L is Pietro's twin brother, and Ms. Mauvais is a French woman who is secretly over 200 years old, and wears gloves and a wig to cover up her true appearance. The couple play a superior role in the series, though have a bigger role in the first book.
- Simone: Fourteen-year-old Simone is the African chocolate taster of the Midnight Sun. Being a super taster, one who has twice as many tastebuds as a normal human and therefore can detect flavors easily, she is used to test the magical chocolate that Señor Hugo makes. She was taken from her parents when she was eleven, and was kept prisoner at the plantation until the trio rescued her and Mel.
- Romi and Montana Skelton: The twin Skelton Sisters are teen pop sensations who are secretly part of the Midnight Sun, and are presumably very old, as they must wear gloves like the other Midnight Sun members.
- Amber and her friend Veronica: Two popular girls at the trio's school, who idolize them. The Skelton Sisters stayed on the plantation with the Midnight Sun throughout the story.
