= Kresley Cole =

American writer

- Occupation: Novelist
- Writing career
- Period: 2003–present
- Genres: Romance, paranormal, young adult fiction, children's literature, fantasy, historical fiction
- Notable works: A Hunger Like No Other, Kiss of a Demon King, Shadow's Claim
- Notable awards: RITA award – Paranormal Romance; 2007 A Hunger Like No Other RITA award – Paranormal Romance; 2010 Kiss of a Demon King RITA award – Paranormal Romance; 2013 Shadow's Claim
- Website: www.kresleycole.com

Kresley Cole is an American author of paranormal romance and young adult novels. She has received three Romance Writers of America (RWA) RITA Awards and was inducted into the RWA Hall of Fame in 2009.

== Biography ==
Kresley Cole is the author of the Immortals After Dark paranormal series, the young adult Arcana Chronicles series, the Gamemakers series, and five historical romances.

A master’s graduate and former athlete, she has traveled extensively across the globe, drawing on these experiences in her writing.

Her books have been translated into 23 languages, garnered 3 RITA awards, a Hall of Fame induction, and consistently appear on the bestseller lists, in the U.S. and abroad.

Cole lives in Florida with her family.

== Bibliography ==
=== The Immortals After Dark series (Paranormal Romance) ===
1. The Warlord Wants Forever. Pocket. February 2006 [2006]. ISBN 978-1-4165-1087-1.
2. A Hunger Like No Other. Pocket Star. April 2006 [2006]. ISBN 978-1-4165-0987-5.
3. No Rest for the Wicked. Pocket Star. October 2006 [2006]. ISBN 978-1-4165-0988-2.
4. Wicked Deeds on a Winter's Night. Pocket Star. October 2007 [2007]. ISBN 978-1-4165-4703-7.
5. Dark Needs at Night's Edge. Pocket. May 2008 [2008]. ISBN 978-1-4165-4707-5.
6. Dark Desires After Dusk. Pocket. June 2008 [2008]. ISBN 978-1-4165-7675-4.
7. Kiss of a Demon King. Pocket. January 2009 [2009]. ISBN 978-1-4165-8094-2.
8. Deep Kiss of Winter. Pocket. October 2009 [2009]. ISBN 978-1-4391-5966-8. (Duology with Gena Showalter)
9. Pleasure of a Dark Prince. Pocket. February 2010 [2010]. ISBN 978-1-4165-8095-9.
10. Demon from the Dark. Pocket. August 2010 [2010]. ISBN 978-1-4391-2312-6.
11. Dreams of a Dark Warrior. Pocket. February 2011 [2011]. ISBN 978-1-4391-3680-5.
12. Lothaire. Gallery. January 2012 [2012]. ISBN 978-1-4391-3682-9.
13. Shadow's Claim. Pocket. November 2012 [2012]. ISBN 978-1-4516-5005-1.
14. MacRieve. Gallery. July 2013 [2013]. ISBN 978-1-4516-4991-8.
15. Dark Skye. Gallery. August 2014 [2014]. ISBN 978-1-4516-4994-9.
16. Sweet Ruin. Gallery. December 2015 [2015]. ISBN 978-1-4516-4997-0.
17. Shadow's Seduction. Valkyrie Press. February 2017 [2017]. ISBN 978-0-9972-1518-2.
18. Wicked Abyss. Gallery. April 2017 [2017]. ISBN 978-1-5011-2025-1.
19. Munro. Valkyrie Press. January 2022 [2022]. ISBN 978-0-9981414-4-2.
20. The Witch Queen of Halloween. Valkyrie Press. March 2024 [2024]. ISBN 979-8-9893762-0-9.
21. Shadow's Heart. Valkyrie Press. March 2025 [2025]. ISBN 979-8-9893762-4-7.

=== Short stories ===
- "The Warlord Wants Forever" in the anthology Playing Easy to Get (Pocket, 2006) ISBN 978-1-4165-1087-1 - introduces the Immortals After Dark series.

=== The Arcana Chronicles series (Young Adult Fiction) ===
1. Poison Princess. Simon & Schuster. October 2012 [2012]. ISBN 978-1-4424-3664-0.
2. Endless Knight. Simon & Schuster. October 2013 [2013]. ISBN 978-1-4424-3667-1.
3. Dead of Winter. Simon & Schuster. January 2015 [2015]. ISBN 978-1-4814-2345-8.
4. Day Zero. Valkyrie Press. August 2016 [2016]. ISBN 978-0-9972151-3-7. short stories
5. Arcana Rising. Valkyrie Press. August 2016 [2016]. ISBN 978-0-9972151-5-1.
6. The Dark Calling. Valkyrie Press. February 2018 [2018]. ISBN 978-0-9981-4141-1.
7. From The Grave. Valkyrie Press. April 2023 [2023]. ISBN 978-0-9981-4146-6.

=== The Game Maker series (Contemporary Romance) ===
1. The Professional. Gallery. May 2014. ISBN 978-1-4767-6231-9.
2. The Master. Gallery. February 2015. ISBN 978-1-4711-1389-5.
3. The Player. Valkyrie Press. April 2016. ISBN 978-0-9972151-0-6.

=== The MacCarrick Brothers trilogy (Historical Romance) ===
1. If You Dare. Pocket. May 2005. ISBN 978-1-4165-4094-6.
2. If You Desire. Pocket. May 2007. ISBN 978-1-4165-0360-6.
3. If You Deceive. Pocket. June 2007. ISBN 978-1-4165-0361-3.

=== The Sutherland Brothers series (Historical Romance) ===
1. The Captain. Pocket. July 2003. ISBN 978-0-7434-6649-3.
2. The Price. Pocket. July 2004. ISBN 978-0-7434-6650-9.

== Awards and reception ==
Awards for Kresley Cole
Year	Nominated work	Category	Award	Result	Notes	Ref.
2007	A Hunger Like No Other	Paranormal Romance	Romance Writers of America RITA Award	Won		
2010	Kiss of a Demon King	Paranormal Romance	Romance Writers of America RITA Award	Won		
2010	Untouchable in Deep Kiss of Winter	Paranormal Romance	Romance Writers of America RITA Award	Finalist		
2013	Lothaire	Paranormal Romance	Romance Writers of America RITA Award	Finalist		
2013	Shadow's Claim	Paranormal Romance	Romance Writers of America RITA Award	Won		
2013			Romance Writers of America Hall of Fame	Inducted	Cole was the 14th member of the Hall of Fame	
2013	Endless Knight		Amazon Best Books of 2013			
2015	Pleasure of a Dark Prince		Audie Award Nominee			
2015	Dead of Winter		RT Book Reviews Top Pick Gold Rating			

- Kresley placed #1 on the New York Times Bestseller List the week of February 8, 2009 with Kiss of a Demon King and again on March 6, 2011 with Dreams of a Dark Warrior.
- Kresley placed in the Top 7 on the New York Times Bestseller List in three different genres in a six-month span.
