= David Foster Wallace bibliography =

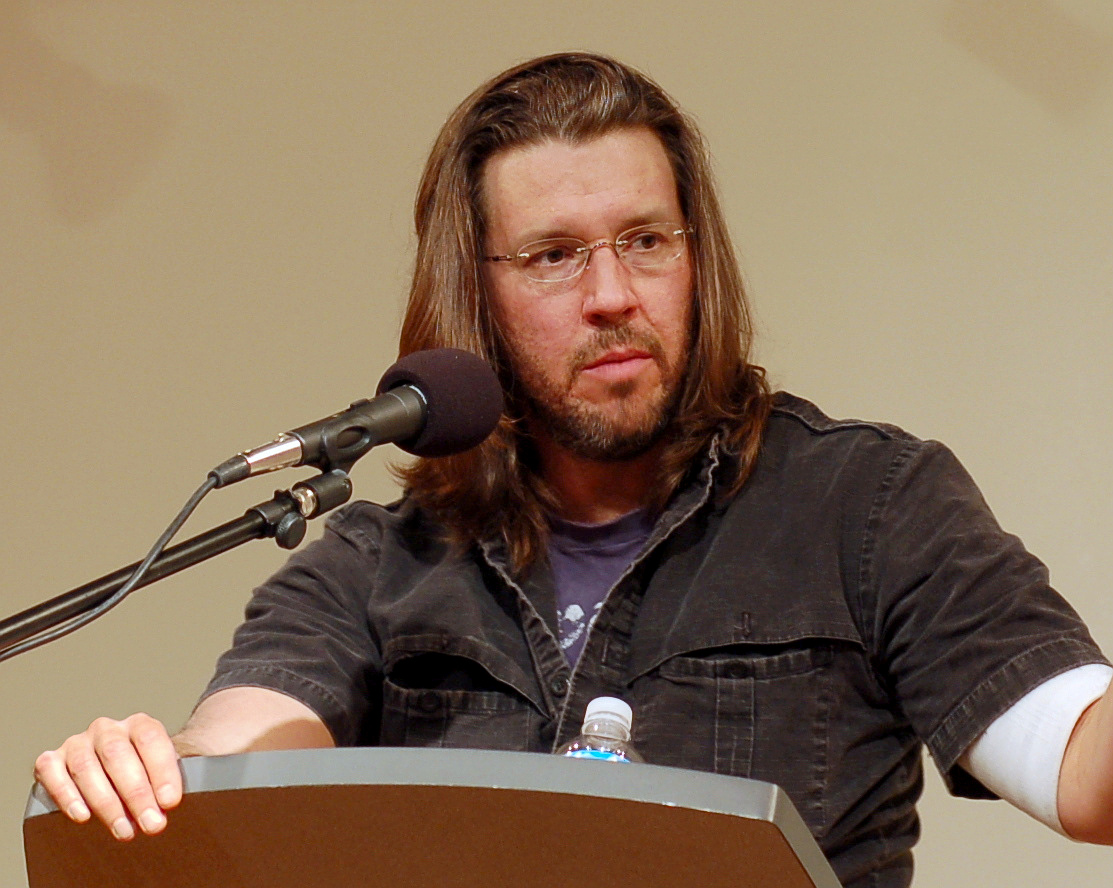
David Foster Wallace giving a reading in San Francisco in 2006

David Foster Wallace (1962–2008) was an American author of novels, essays, and short stories. In addition to writing, Wallace was employed as a professor at Illinois State University in Normal, Illinois, and Pomona College in Claremont, California.

== Fiction ==
=== Novels ===
- The Broom of the System (1987). ISBN 9781101153536
- Infinite Jest (1996). ISBN 9780316920049
- The Pale King (2011, posthumous). ISBN 9780316175296

=== Short story collections ===
- Girl with Curious Hair (1989). ISBN 9780393313963
- Brief Interviews with Hideous Men (1999). ISBN 9780316086899
- Oblivion: Stories (2004). ISBN 9780759511569

=== Short fiction ===
- 1984: "The Planet Trillaphon As It Stands In Relation to The Bad Thing", Amherst Review
  - 2009: republished in Tin House
- 1984: "The Piano and the Pantechnicon", The Allegheny Review
- 1985: "Mr. Costigan in May", Clarion
  - 1987: included in BOTS
- 1987: "Lyndon", Arrival
  - 1989: included in Girl with Curious Hair
- 1987: "Here and There", Fiction
  - 1989: included in Girl with Curious Hair
- 1987: "Other Math", Western Humanities Review
- 1987: "Say Never", Florida Review
  - 1989: included in Girl with Curious Hair
- 1987: "Solomon Silverfish", Sonora Review
- 1988: "John Billy", Conjunctions
  - 1989: included in Girl with Curious Hair
- 1988: "Late Night", Playboy
  - 1989: included in Girl with Curious Hair as "My Appearance"
- 1988: "Everything is Green", Puerto del Sol
  - 1989: reprinted in Harper's
  - 1989: included in Girl with Curious Hair
- 1988: "Little Expressionless Animals ", Paris Review
  - 1989: included in Girl with Curious Hair
- 1989: "Crash of 69", Between C&D
- 1991: "Church Not Made With Hands", Rampike
  - 1999: included in BIHM
- 1991: "Forever Overhead", Fiction International
  - 1999: reprinted in BIHM
- 1991: "Order and Flux in Northampton", Conjunctions
- 1992: "Rabbit Resurrected", Harper's
- 1992: "Three Protrusions", Grand Street no. 42 [Excerpt from Infinite Jest]
- 1993: "The Awakening of My Interest in Annular Systems", Harper's
  - Excerpt from Infinite Jest
- 1994 "Several Birds", The New Yorker
  - Excerpt from Infinite Jest
- 1995 "An Interval", The New Yorker
  - Excerpt from Infinite Jest
- 1996 "Chivalry", Grand Street no. 55 [Excerpt from Infinite Jest]
- 1997: "Death Is Not The End", Grand Street no. 60
  - 1999: reprinted (extended) in Brief Interviews with Hideous Men
- 1998: "A Radically Condensed History of Postindustrial Life", Ploughshares, Spring 1998
  - 1999: reprinted (slightly extended) in Brief Interviews with Hideous Men
- 1998: "Brief Interviews with Hideous Men", Harper's
  - 1999: reprinted (extended, but with interview 16 omitted) in Brief Interviews with Hideous Men
- 1998: "The Depressed Person", Harper's
  - Reprinted in Brief Interviews with Hideous Men
- 1999: "Asset", The New Yorker
  - Reprinted in Brief Interviews with Hideous Men
- 1999: "Another Example of the Porousness of Various Borders (VI): Projected but not Improbable Transcript of Author's Parents' Marriage's End, 1971.", McSweeney's, Issue No.3, Late Summer, Early Fall, 1999
  - Printed in its entirety on the spine of the issue
  - Reprinted in Brief Interviews with Hideous Men
- 2002: "Peoria (4)"; "Peoria (9)", TriQuarterly #112
  - Excerpts from The Pale King
- 2007: "Good People", The New Yorker
  - Excerpt from The Pale King
- 2008: "The Compliance Branch", Harper's
  - Excerpt from The Pale King
- 2009 "Wiggle Room", The New Yorker
  - Excerpt from The Pale King
- 2009 "All That", The New Yorker
- 2010 "A New Examiner," Harper's
  - Excerpt from The Pale King
- 2011 "Backbone", The New Yorker
  - Excerpt from The Pale King
- 2013 "The Awakening of My Interest in Advanced Tax", Madra Press
  - Excerpt from The Pale King
- 2022 "Something To Do With Paying Attention", Simon and Schuster
  - Excerpt from The Pale King

== Nonfiction ==
=== Collections ===
- A Supposedly Fun Thing I'll Never Do Again (1997). ISBN 9780316090520
- Consider the Lobster (2005). ISBN 9780349119519
- Both Flesh and Not (2012). ISBN 9780316214698 [posthumous]
- String Theory: David Foster Wallace on Tennis (2016). ISBN 1598534807 [posthumous, Library of America Special Edition]

=== Other books ===
- 1990: Signifying Rappers: Rap and Race in the Urban Present. Second edition with a new preface by Costello published in 2013.
- 2003: Everything and More: A Compact History of Infinity.
- 2010: Fate, Time, and Language: An Essay on Free Will. Columbia University Press, 2010 [reprint]. ISBN 978-0231151573. This text is an anthology presenting, in full, Wallace's undergraduate honors thesis in Philosophy at Amherst, "Richard Taylor's 'Fatalism' and the Semantics of Physical Modality." Additional material in the volume includes James Ryerson's introductory essay: "A Head That Throbbed Heartlike: The Philosophical Mind of David Foster Wallace"; philosopher Jay Garfield's epilogue; and philosophical essays regarding Taylor's fatalist argument.
- (2014): The David Foster Wallace Reader. ISBN 9780316182393. [posthumous] A collection of excerpts.
- (2014): String Theory: David Foster Wallace on Tennis ISBN 9781598534801

=== Essays ===
- 1985: "Richard Taylor's 'Fatalism' and the Semantics of Physical Modality" (thesis)
  - 2010: Reprinted in Fate, Time, and Language: An Essay on Free Will (see above).
- 1987: "Matters of Sense and Opacity", The New York Times letter
- 1988: "Fictional Futures and the Conspicuously Young", The Review of Contemporary Fiction
  - 2012: Reprinted in Both Flesh and Not
- 1990: "Signifying Rappers" (with Mark Costello), The Missouri Review
  - 1990: Expanded to book-length and published as Signifying Rappers: Rap and Race in the Urban Present
- 1990: "The Horror of Pretentiousness: 'The Great and Secret Show' by Clive Barker ", The Washington Post
- 1990: "Michael Martone's Fort Wayne is Seventh on Hitler's List", Harvard Book Review
- 1990: "The Empty Plenum: David Markson's Wittgenstein's Mistress" The Review of Contemporary Fiction
  - 2012: Reprinted in Both Flesh and Not
- 1991: "Exploring Inner Space: War Fever by J.G. Ballard", The Washington Post
- 1991: "The Million-Dollar Tattoo: Laura's Skin by F.J. Fiederspiel", New York Times Book Review
- 1991: "Tragic Cuban Emigre and a Tale of 'The Door to Happiness':The Doorman by Reinaldo Arenas", The Philadelphia Inquirer Book Review
- 1991: "Presley as Paradigm: Dead Elvis: A Chronicle of Cultural Obsession by Greil Marcus", Los Angeles Times
- 1991: "Tennis, Trigonometry, Tornado", Harper's Magazine
  - 1997: reprinted in A Supposedly Fun Thing I'll Never Do Again as "Derivative Sport in Tornado Alley"
  - 2014: reprinted in String Theory: David Foster Wallace on Tennis under its new title
- 1991: "Morte d'Author: An Autopsy" Harvard Book Review
  - 1992: reprinted as "Greatly Exaggerated" in A Supposedly Fun Thing I'll Never Do Again
- 1992: "Kathy Acker's Portrait of an Eye: Three Novels", Harvard Review
- 1992: "Iris' Story: An Inversion of Philosophic Skepticism: The Blindfold by Siri Hustvedt", in The Philadelphia Inquirer
  - 1992: reprinted in Contemporary Literary Criticism (vol. 76)
- 1992: "Tracy Austin's 'Beyond Center Court: My Story'", The Philadelphia Inquirer
  - 2005: reprinted in Consider the Lobster as "How Tracy Austin Broke My Heart"
  - 2014: reprinted under its new title in String Theory: David Foster Wallace on Tennis
- 1993: "E Unibus Pluram: Television and U.S. Fiction" Review of Contemporary Fiction
  - 1997: reprinted in A Supposedly Fun Thing I'll Never Do Again lightly edited and with footnotes
- 1994: "Ticket to the Fair" Harper's Magazine in Harper's
  - 1997: reprinted in A Supposedly Fun Thing I'll Never Do Again as "Getting Away from Already Being Pretty Much Away from It All"
- 1994: "Mr. Cogito" Spin
  - 2012: Reprinted in Both Flesh and Not
- 1996: "The String Theory" Esquire
  - 1997: reprinted as "Tennis Player Michael Joyce's Professional Artistry as a Paradigm of Certain Stuff about Choice, Freedom, Discipline, Joy, Grotesquerie, and Human Completeness" in A Supposedly Fun Thing I'll Never Do Again
  - 2014: reprinted under its new title in String Theory: David Foster Wallace on Tennis
- 1996: "Shipping Out: On the (nearly lethal) comforts of a luxury cruise" Harper's
  - 1997: reprinted as "A Supposedly Fun Thing I'll Never Do Again" in A Supposedly Fun Thing I'll Never Do Again
- 1996: "God Bless You, Mr. Franzen", Harper's letter (September 1996)
- 1996: "Democracy and Commerce at the US Open", Tennis (included with the New York Times Magazine)
  - 2012: reprinted in Both Flesh and Not
  - 2014: reprinted in String Theory: David Foster Wallace on Tennis
- 1996: "Impediments to Passion" in Might Magazine
  - 1998: reprinted as "Hail The Returning Dragon, Clothed In New Fire" in Shiny Adidas Tracksuits and the Death of Camp and Other Essays from Might Magazine
  - 2012: reprinted as "Back in New Fire" in Both Flesh and Not
- 1996: "Quo Vadis – Introduction", Review of Contemporary Fiction
- 1996: "David Lynch Keeps His Head" in Premiere
  - 1997: published and enlarged in A Supposedly Fun Thing I'll Never Do Again
- 1996: "Feodor's Guide", Voice Literary Supplement (book review)
  - 2005: reprinted as "Joseph Frank's Dostoevsky" in Consider the Lobster
- 1997: "Twilight of the Great Literary Beasts: John Updike, Champion Literary Phallocrat, Drops One; Is This Finally the End for the Magnificent Narcissist?", The New York Observer book review
  - 1998: reprinted and edited in Consider the Lobster as "Certainly the End of Something or Other, One Would Sort of Have to Think: (Re John Updike's Toward the End of Time)"
- 1998: "Neither Adult Nor Entertainment", Premiere
  - published in an abbreviated and bowdlerized version under the names Willem R. deGroot and Matt Rundlet
  - reprinted and expanded as "Big Red Son" in Consider the Lobster
- 1998: "The Nature of the Fun", Fiction Writer
  - 1998: reprinted in Why I Write: Thoughts on the Craft of Fiction (Will Blythe, ed.)
  - 2012: reprinted in Both Flesh and Not
- 1998: "F/X Porn", Waterstone's Magazine
  - 2012: reprinted in Both Flesh and Not as "The (As It Were) Seminal Importance of Terminator 2"
- 1998: "Laughing with Kafka", speech given at the Pen American Center to celebrate a new publication of The Castle by Schocken Books.
  - 1998: first printed in Harper's
  - 2005: reprinted (with different footnotes) as "Some Remarks on Kafka's Funniness from Which Probably Not Enough Has Been Removed" in Consider the Lobster
- "Overlooked: Five Direly Underappreciated U.S. Novels >1960". Salon. April 12, 1999. Archived from the original on October 25, 2008.
  - 2012: reprinted in Both Flesh and Not
- 1999: "100-word statement", Rolling Stone
- 2000: "Rhetoric and the Math Melodrama" (heavily edited), Science
  - 2000: response to a letter to the editor responding to the original article
  - 2012: reprinted in Both Flesh and Not
- 2000: "The Weasel, Twelve Monkeys, and the Shrub", Rolling Stone
  - 2000: reprinted (greatly expanded and with a preface) as Up, Simba!: 7 Days on the Trail of an Anticandidate as an e-book
  - 2005: reprinted (from the e-book) in Consider the Lobster
  - 2008: reprinted (from the e-book with a foreword by Jacob Weisberg) as McCain's Promise: Aboard the Straight Talk Express with John McCain and a Whole Bunch of Actual Reporters, Thinking About Hope
- 2001: "Tense Present: Democracy, English and the wars over usage", Harper's
  - 2005: reprinted and enlarged as "Authority and American Usage (or, 'Politics and the English Language' is Redundant)" in Consider the Lobster
- 2001: "The Best of the Prose Poem", Rain Taxi
  - 2012: Reprinted in Both Flesh and Not
- 2001: "9/11: The View From the Midwest", Rolling Stone, October 25, 2001
  - 2001: published online by Rolling Stone as "The View from Mrs. Thompson's"
  - 2005: reprinted as "The View from Mrs. Thompson's" in Consider the Lobster
- 2004: "Twenty-Four Word Notes" printed as "Word Note" (various), Oxford American Writer's Thesauraus
  - 2012: reprinted in Both Flesh and Not
- 2004: "Borges on the Couch", New York Times Book Review
  - See also: author's reply
  - 2012: Reprinted in Both Flesh and Not
- 2004: "Consider the Lobster", Gourmet , published
  - 2005: reprinted in Consider the Lobster
- 2005: "Kenyon Commencement Address"
  - 2006: reprinted (revised and edited) in The Best American Nonrequired Reading 2006
  - 2008: reprinted (severely abridged) in The Wall Street Journal as "David Foster Wallace on Life and Work"
  - 2009: reprinted as This Is Water
- 2005: "Host", published The Atlantic
  - 2005: reprinted and expanded in Consider the Lobster
- 2006: "Federer as Religious Experience", New York Times Magazine: PLAY
  - 2012: reprinted as "Federer Both Flesh and Not" in Both Flesh and Not
  - 2014: reprinted under its new title in String Theory: David Foster Wallace on Tennis
- 2007: "Deciderization 2007 — a Special Report" published as introduction to The Best American Essays 2007
  - 2012: Reprinted in Both Flesh and Not
- 2007: "Just Asking", The Atlantic
  - 2012: Reprinted in Both Flesh and Not
- 2008: "It All Gets Quite Tricky", Harper's

== Contributions ==
- Fiction International 19:2 (Aids Art, Photomontages from Germany and England) (1991), contributing author
- Grand Street 42 (1992), contributor
- Grand Street 46 (1993), contributor
- Grand Street 55 (1996), contributor
- Grand Street 60 (1997), contributor
- The Review of Contemporary Fiction: The Future of Fiction, A Forum Edited by David Foster Wallace (1996), editor
- Open City Number Five: Change or Die (1997), contributing author
- Poetry in Review; 23, 1/2 (1998), contributing author
- The Best American Essays 2007 (2007), guest editor
- The New Kings of Nonfiction (2007), contributing author
- The Mechanics' Institute Review, Issue 4 (September 2007)

== Interviews ==
- Becky Bradway, "Interview with David Foster Wallace." Creating Nonfiction. Ed. Becky Bradway and Doug Hesse. Boston: Bedford/St. Martin's, 2009, 770-73.
- Larry McCaffery, "An Interview with David Foster Wallace." Review of Contemporary Fiction 13.2 (Summer 1993), 127–150. (text at Dalkey Archive Press website)
- Laura Miller, "The Salon Interview: David Foster Wallace." Salon 9 (1996).
- "The Usage Wars." Radio interview with David Foster Wallace and Bryan A. Garner. The Connection (March 30, 2001). (full audio interview)
- Caleb Crain, "Approaching Infinity: David Foster Wallace talks about writing novels, riding the Green Line, and his new book on higher math." The Boston Globe. October 26, 2003.
- Michael Goldfarb, "David Foster Wallace." radio interview for The Connection (June 25, 2004). (full audio interview)
- David Foster Wallace on Bookworm
- Charlie Rose: An interview with David Foster Wallace March 27, 1997
- Zachary Chouteau, "Infinite Zest: Words with the Singular David Foster Wallace." Bookselling This Week
- Dave Eggers, "David Foster Wallace." The Believer. November 2003.
- "Brief Interview with a Five Draft Man." Interview with Stacey Schmeidel for Amherst Magazine. Spring 1999.
- A radio interview with David Foster Wallace Aired on the Lewis Burke Frumkes Radio Show in the spring of 1999.
- 2010: Lipsky, David. Although of Course You End Up Becoming Yourself: A Road Trip with David Foster Wallace. New York: Broadway, 2010.
- Wallace, David Foster. David Foster Wallace: The Last Interview: and Other Conversations. Melville House, 2012. ISBN 978-1612192062
- Bryan A. Garner and David Foster Wallace. Quack This Way: David Foster Wallace & Bryan A. Garner talk language and writing. RosePen Books, 2013. ISBN 978-0-991-11810-6.

== Works about David Foster Wallace ==
=== Books ===
- Bolger, Robert K. and Korb, Scott (eds). Gesturing Toward Reality: David Foster Wallace and Philosophy. Bloomsbury Academic, 2014. ISBN 978-1441162656
- Boswell, Marshall. Understanding David Foster Wallace. Columbia: University of South Carolina Press, 2003. ISBN 1-57003-517-2
- Boswell, Marshall and Burn, Stephen, eds. A Companion to David Foster Wallace Studies. Palgrave Macmillan, 2013 (American Literature Readings in the Twenty-First Century). ISBN 9781137078346
- Burn, Stephen. David Foster Wallace's Infinite Jest: A Reader's Guide. New York, London: Continuum, 2003. ISBN 0-8264-1477-X
- Carlisle, Greg. Elegant Complexity: A Study of David Foster Wallace's Infinite Jest. Austin, TX: Sideshow Media Group Press, 2007. ISBN 978-0-9761465-3-7
- Carlisle, Greg. "Nature's Nightmare: Analyzing David Foster Wallace's Oblivion". Sideshow Media Group Press, 2013.
- Cohen, Samuel, and Konstantinou, Lee (eds.). The Legacy of David Foster Wallace. University of Iowa Press, 2012. ISBN 9781609381042
- Dowling, William, and Bell, Robert. A Reader's Companion to Infinite Jest. Xlibris, 2004. ISBN 1-4134-8446-8
- Hayes-Brady, Clare. The Unspeakable Failures of David Foster Wallace: Language, Identity and Resistance. New York: Bloomsbury, 2016.
- Hering, David, ed. Consider David Foster Wallace: Critical Essays. Austin, TX: Sideshow Media Group Press, 2010.
- Hering, David. David Foster Wallace: Fiction and Form. New York: Bloomsbury, 2016.
- Jackson, Edward, Xavier Marcó del Pont, and Tony Venezia (eds.), David Foster Wallace Special Issue of Orbit: A Journal of American Literature, 22 March 2017.
- Kelly, Adam. "David Foster Wallace and the New Sincerity in American Fiction. " Consider David Foster Wallace: Critical Essay. Ed. David Hering. Austin, TX: Sideshow Media Group Press, 2010. 131–46.
- Lipsky, David. Although of Course You End Up Becoming Yourself: A Road Trip with David Foster Wallace. New York: Broadway, 2010. ISBN 978-0307592439
- Max, D. T. Every Love Story is a Ghost Story: A Life of David Foster Wallace. New York: Viking, 2012.
- McGowan, Michael and Brick, Martin, David Foster Wallace and Religion: Essays on Faith and Fiction. New York: Bloomsbury, 2019.
- Miller, Adam S. The Gospel According to David Foster Wallace: Boredom and Addiction in an Age of Distraction (New Directions in Religion and Literature). New York: Bloomsbury, 2016.
- Severs, Jeffrey. David Foster Wallace's Balancing Books: Fictions of Value. New York: Columbia University Press, 2017.
- Thompson, Lucas Global Wallace (DFW Studies). New York: Bloomsbury, 2017.
- Wallace, David Foster. David Foster Wallace: The Last Interview: and Other Conversations. Melville House, 2012. ISBN 978-1612192062

=== Academic articles and book chapters ===
- Benzon, Kiki. "Darkness Legible, Unquiet Lines: Mood Disorders in the Fiction of David Foster Wallace." Creativity, Madness and Civilization. Ed. Richard Pine. Cambridge: Cambridge Scholars Press, 2007: 187–198.
- Bresnan, Mark. "The Work of Play in David Foster Wallace's Infinite Jest." Critique: Studies in Contemporary Fiction 50:1 (2008), 51–68.
- Burn, Stephen. "Generational Succession and a Source for the Title of David Foster Wallace's The Broom of the System." Notes on Contemporary Literature 33.2 (2003), 9–11.
- Cioffi, Frank Louis. "An Anguish Becomes Thing: Narrative as Performance in David Foster Wallace's Infinite Jest." Narrative 8.2 (2000), 161–181.
- Delfino, Andrew Steven. "Becoming the New Man in Post-Postmodernist Fiction: Portrayals of Masculinities in David Foster Wallace's Infinite Jest and Chuck Palahniuk's Fight Club. MA Thesis, Georgia State University.
- Ewijk, Petrus van. "'I' and the 'Other': The relevance of Wittgenstein, Buber and Levinas for an understanding of AA's Recovery Program in David Foster Wallace's Infinite Jest." English Text Construction 2.1 (2009), 132–45.
- Giles, Paul. "Sentimental Posthumanism: David Foster Wallace." Twentieth Century Literature 53.3 (Fall 2007): 327-44.
- Goerlandt, Iannis and Luc Herman. "David Foster Wallace." Post-war Literatures in English: A Lexicon of Contemporary Authors 56 (2004), 1–16; A1-2, B1-2.
- Goerlandt, Iannis. "Fußnoten und Performativität bei David Foster Wallace. Fallstudien." Am Rande bemerkt. Anmerkungspraktiken in literarischen Texten. Ed. Bernhard Metz & Sabine Zubarik. Berlin: Kulturverlag Kadmos, 2008: 387–408.
- Goerlandt, Iannis. "'Put the book down and slowly walk away': Irony and David Foster Wallace's Infinite Jest." Critique: Studies in Contemporary Fiction 47.3 (2006), 309–28.
- Goerlandt, Iannis. "'Still steaming as its many arms extended': Pain in David Foster Wallace's Incarnations of Burned Children." Sprachkunst 37.2 (2006), 297–308.
- Harris, Jan Ll. Addiction and the Societies of Control: David Foster Wallace's Infinite Jest, paper delivered at Figuring Addictions/Rethinking Consumption conference, Institute for Cultural Research, Lancaster University, April 4–5, 2002.
- Hering, David. "Theorising David Foster Wallace's Toxic Postmodern Spaces." US Studies Online 18 (2011)
- Holland, Mary K. "'The Art's Heart's Purpose': Braving the Narcissistic Loop of David Foster Wallace's Infinite Jest." Critique: Studies in Contemporary Fiction 47.3 (2006), 218–42.
- Jacobs, Timothy. "The Brothers Incandenza: Translating Ideology in Fyodor Dostoevsky's The Brothers Karamazov and David Foster Wallace's Infinite Jest." Contemporary Literary Criticism Vol. 271. Ed. Jeffrey Hunter. New York: Gale, 2009. Also published in Texas Studies in Literature and Language 49.3 (2007), 265–92.
- Jacobs, Timothy. "American Touchstone: The Idea of Order in Gerard Manley Hopkins and David Foster Wallace." Comparative Literature Studies 38.3 (2001), 215–31.
- Kelly, Adam. "David Foster Wallace: the Death of the Author and the Birth of a Discipline." Irish Journal of American Studies Online 2 (2010).
- Kelly, Adam. "Development Through Dialogue: David Foster Wallace and the Novel of Ideas. " Studies in the Novel 44.3 (2012): 265–81.
- Kelly, Adam. "Dialectic of Sincerity: Lionel Trilling and David Foster Wallace. " Post45 Peer Reviewed (17 October 2014).
- LeClair, Tom. "The Prodigious Fiction of Richard Powers, William T. Vollmann, and David Foster Wallace." Critique: Studies in Contemporary Fiction 38.1 (1996), 12–37.
- Morris, David. "Lived Time and Absolute Knowing: Habit and Addiction from Infinite Jest to the Phenomenology of Spirit." Clio: A Journal of Literature, History and the Philosophy of History 30 (2001), 375–415.
- Nichols, Catherine. "Dialogizing Postmodern Carnival: David Foster Wallace's Infinite Jest". Critique: Studies in Contemporary Fiction 43.1 (2001), 3–16.
- Rother, James. "Reading and Riding the Post-Scientific Wave. The Shorter Fiction of David Foster Wallace". Review of Contemporary Fiction 13.2 (1993), 216–234. ISBN 1-56478-123-2
- Tysdal, Dan. "Inarticulation and the Figure of Enjoyment: Raymond Carver's Minimalism Meets David Foster Wallace's 'A Radically Condensed History of Postindustrial Life'". Wascana Review of Contemporary Poetry and Short Fiction 38.1 (2003), 66–83.

=== Book reviews and online essays ===
- Benzon, Kiki. "Mister Squishy, c'est moi: David Foster Wallace's Oblivion" electronic book review (2004).
- Esposito, Scott, et al. "Who Was David Foster Wallace? A Symposium on the Writing of David Foster Wallace". The Quarterly Conversation.
- Harris, Michael. "A Sometimes Funny Book Supposedly about Infinity: A Review of Everything and More". Notices of the AMS 51.6 (2004), 632–638.
- Jacobs, Tim. "The Fight: Considering David Foster Wallace Considering You". Rain Taxi Review of Books. Online Edition, Part Two. Winter 2009.
- Jacobs, Timothy. "David Foster Wallace's Infinite Jest." The Explicator 58.3 (2000), 172–75.
- Jacobs, Timothy. "David Foster Wallace's The Broom of the System." Ed. Alan Hedblad. Beacham's Encyclopedia of Popular Fiction. Detroit: Gale Research Press, 2001, 41–50.
- Kelly, Adam. "The Map and the Territory: Infinite Boston." The Millions (13 Aug 2013).
- Mason, Wyatt. "Don't like it? You don't have to play [review of Oblivion: Stories]". London Review of Books 26.22 (2004).
