= Oblivion: Stories =

2004 short fiction collection by David Foster Wallace

- First edition hardcover
- Author: David Foster Wallace
- Cover artist: Mario J. Pulice
- Language: English
- Genre: Literary fiction, postmodern literature
- Publisher: Little, Brown and Company
- Publication date: June 8, 2004 (U.S.)
- Publication place: United States
- Media type: Print (hardback & paperback)
- Pages: 329

Oblivion: Stories (2004) is a collection of short fiction by the American writer David Foster Wallace. Oblivion is Wallace's third and last short story collection and was listed as a 2004 New York Times Notable Book of the Year. In the stories, Wallace explores the nature of reality, dreams, trauma, and the "dynamics of consciousness". The story "Good Old Neon" was included in The O. Henry Prize Stories 2002.

== Composition and publication ==
The collection's writing overlapped with Wallace's last novel, The Pale King; many of the stories came from notebooks Wallace used to write the book and may have begun as sections of it.

Wallace first suggested a new collection of stories to his editor Michael Pietsch in October 2001. Much of the editing appears to have been completed by October 2003. Published in June 2004, the book sold 18,000 hardcover copies in its first year.

== List of stories ==
- "Mister Squishy" was originally published as "Mr. Squishy" in McSweeney's #5 (2000), under the pseudonym Elizabeth Klemm. The story takes place in November 1995 and follows a focus group in a marketer's conference room and the group's facilitator, Terry Schmidt. The group is taste-testing a new chocolate snack named "Felonies!" while a person free climbs up the building's north face.
- "The Soul Is Not a Smithy" was originally published in AGNI #57 (2003). In his review of the collection, Scott M. Morris wrote that the story "may well be a masterpiece". The title apparently refers to James Joyce's novel A Portrait of the Artist as a Young Man, in which Stephen Dedalus writes: "Welcome, O life! I go to encounter for the millionth time the reality of experience and to forge in the smithy of my soul the uncreated conscience of my race." An unnamed narrator recounts his experience in his fourth-grade civics class in Columbus, Ohio. The substitute teacher, Mr. Johnson, has a psychotic breakdown, which results in a hostage crisis, but the narrator spends his time daydreaming and looking out of the classroom window.
- "Incarnations of Burned Children" was originally published in Esquire (November 2000). A baby is burned by boiling water.
- "Another Pioneer" was originally published in Colorado Review (Summer 2001). It is a fable about a Stone Age village in which a wise child can answer any question posed to him.
- "Good Old Neon" was originally published in Conjunctions #37 (November 2001). In his review of the collection, Chad Harbach called the story an "indisputable masterpiece". Marshall Boswell wrote that it is the collection's "best and most celebrated stand-alone story". It was included in O. Henry Prize Stories 2002. The story consists of the monologue of a lonely advertising executive, Neal, who commits suicide by crashing his car. Neal tells his psychiatrist about his fraudulence, deceptions, failures, and manipulations.
- "Philosophy and the Mirror of Nature" was originally published, in slightly edited form, as "Yet Another Example of the Porousness of Certain Borders (VIII)" in McSweeney's #1 (1998). According to Paul Giles, the title "directly echoes" Richard Rorty's book Philosophy and the Mirror of Nature. In the story, an unnamed narrator recounts the story of his mother's botched facial plastic surgery, which left her with a look of constant terror on her face, and the litigation surrounding that surgery. The narrator is also entangled in litigation related to his black-widow spider farm.
- "Oblivion" was originally published in Black Clock No. 1 (Spring 2004/Summer 2004). The narrator, Randall Napier, recounts his exhausting fight with his wife Hope over his alleged snoring, which she says keeps her awake at night. Randall protests, maintaining that he was awake and consequently unable to snore, while Hope was actually asleep. Eventually they travel to a sleep clinic to monitor their behaviors and determine who is right.
- "The Suffering Channel" is a novella set in July 2001. Its protagonist, Skip Atwater, is a journalist who works for the fictional Style Magazine at the World Trade Center. Atwater is attempting to write an article about a midwestern artist, Brint Moltke, whose excrement reportedly resembles famous cultural objects, for the September 10, 2001, issue of Style.

== Critical reception ==
The book was met with a "familiar duality" in its reviews, receiving a mixture of both extremely positive and negative reviews.

In Time, Joel Stein wrote that the "breathtakingly smart" stories are "epic modernism", with "big plots, absurd Beckettian humor and science-fiction-height ideas portrayed vis-a-vis slow, realistic stream of consciousness." In The San Diego Union-Tribune, Jan Wildt wrote that Oblivion argues convincingly "that the short story is [Wallace's] true fictional metier" and that Oblivion "puts his stylistic idiosyncrasy to better use than any of its predecessors". In Salon, Laura Miller wrote that Wallace had "perfected a particularly subtle form of horror story" and that his "long arcs of prose and the narrative sidetracks are exposed not as tortuous strivings toward some hard-won truth but as an insulation that people spin between themselves and the sharp edges of their condition." In the Los Angeles Times, Scott M. Morris wrote that Wallace had "earned a place as one of America's most daring and talented young writers". Morris said that though some of the stories left the reader "more impressed with [Wallace's] intelligence than with the stories", with "'The Suffering Channel,' 'Mister Squishy' and 'The Soul Is Not a Smithy,' Wallace transcends mere dazzling displays and explores human emotions with sensitivity". Morris also wrote that in this collection "the high stakes of life have supplanted postmodern playfulness" and that "Wallace has laid down a marker that will be coveted by readers".

In n+1, Chad Harbach wrote that "apart from 'The Suffering Channel' and 'Good Old Neon', Oblivion has a casual feel", adding, "compared to the premeditated formal performances of Brief Interviews with Hideous Men, his previous collection, much of Oblivion has a loose, tossed-off feel." In the London Review of Books, Wyatt Mason wrote that although the stories are "a bright array of sad and moving and funny and fascinating human objects of undeniable, unusual value", they still may have a "fundamental rhetorical failure" due to their difficulty. Nonetheless, Mason called Oblivion "the most interesting and serious and accomplished shorter fiction published in the past decade". In The New York Times, Michiko Kakutani wrote that Oblivion is dominated by "tiresome, whiny passages", and that though Wallace is a "prose magician", in Oblivion he "gives us only the tiniest tasting of his smorgasbord of talents. Instead, he all too often settles for the sort of self-indulgent prattling that bogged down his 1999 collection, Brief Interviews with Hideous Men, and the cheap brand of irony and ridicule that he once denounced in an essay as 'agents of a great despair and stasis in U.S. culture'". James Wood also panned the collection in The New Republic, writing that "Mister Squishy" is "fundamentally unreadable" because Wallace too often "bloats his sentences with mimesis". "Above all", Wood wrote, "his immersionist's willingness to saturate his fictions in the germs that he is documenting makes them sick themselves". Wood called the collection as a whole "talented, frustrating, and finally intolerable", writing that the stories fail to "move the reader" because they "strangely reproduce the extreme coldness that they abhor."

In 2018, when Vulture.com gathered together a panel of prominent critics to choose the 100 most important books of the 21st century so far, Oblivion was among the books selected.

== Analysis ==
Criticism of Oblivion has involved attempts to discuss the collection as a whole, in relation to other work by Wallace, and as individual stories. Marshall Boswell called Oblivion Wallace's "bleakest" work of fiction, writing that Wallace "uncharacteristically" provides "no way out" of solipsism and loneliness and "repeatedly undermines many of the techniques for alleviation" of loneliness, such as communication, that he presented in Infinite Jest. "Oblivion", Boswell wrote, "remains unique in Wallace's oeuvre in its unrelenting pessimism." D.T. Max wrote that the stories in Oblivion "seem afraid of compression, as if the title were a threat that could only be defended against by the relentlessly engaged consciousness."

Many critics have linked Oblivion to other works by Wallace, both fiction and nonfiction. Max said that many of the stories are "successors" to Brief Interviews with Hideous Men in that they are concerned "mostly with middle-aged, middle-class white men in middle America." Others have called Oblivion and The Pale King companion texts. Max wrote that while Oblivion is descriptive of a lonely American society, The Pale King is prescriptive, suggesting a "way out of the bind". Boswell also called The Pale King the "compositional companion" to Oblivion because both have themes of the management of "entropy" and "shit, art, death". But The Pale King can ultimately be seen as a "corrective, or at least dialectical partner, to Oblivion's haunted insularity", Boswell wrote, also linking Oblivion to This Is Water, in that it depicts adults "hypnotized by the constant monologues" inside their heads, and to "Deciderization 2007", an essay that appears in Both Flesh and Not, in its concern with entropy and sorting data and a "surfeit of information". Tom Tracey wrote that "The Soul Is Not a Smithy" resembles The Pale King and recalls the philosophy of This Is Water in its discussion of attention and boredom.

Other critics examined individual stories more closely. Tracey wrote that in many of the stories Wallace seeks to "place the crucial events of each tale beyond the frame of the main exposition": "the important actions of the narrative are seen to occur only on the extreme periphery of the narrator's awareness." Tracey suggested that the meaning and goal of this is to "call for greater attentiveness to our peripheral surroundings" and to show that "the most important events of our lives often take place on the margins of our quotidian experience." He also wrote that in "The Soul Is Not a Smithy", the narrator's inattentiveness depicts how "imagination can provide a psychological outlet, or refuge, from suffering."

In the same essay, Tracey develops his thoughts on the title story, "Oblivion", which raises questions about what reality is and what is real. The story, Tracey writes, gives an ambiguous answer, suggesting that what is real and true comes from our own decisions about what to believe. He calls the story an "imaginative response" to René Descartes's Meditations on First Philosophy.

In The New York Times, Walter Kirn wrote that "Good Old Neon" focuses on "a philosophical conundrum: the question of whether human beings can be said to possess authentic selves or whether, like 'David Wallace,' the story's narrator, we are really just a bunch of shabby fakes cut off from our own and others' essential beings by the inadequacy of language."

In the Los Angeles Review of Books, Hannah Smart called the structure of "Mister Squishy" a prescient image of a world in which access to information vastly exceeds the average person's ability to find meaning.

== Translation ==
Oblivion has been translated into French, Italian, Spanish, Polish, Lithuanian, Persian, Serbian, Greek, Chinese, Korean, Czech, German, Russian, and Estonian.

Oblivion was published in German as two separate books, both of which were translated in part by Marcus Igendaay and Ulrich Blumenbach. The first book, In Alter Vertrautheit, was published in 2006 and contains the stories "Mister Squishy", "Die Seele ist kein Hammerwerk" ("The Soul Is Not a Smithy"), "Inkarnationen gebrannter Kinder" ("Incarnations of Burned Children"), "Noch ein Pionier" ("Another Pioneer"), and "Neon in alter Vertrauheit" ("Good Old Neon"). The second book, Vergessenheit, was published in 2008 and contains "Der Spiegel der Natur – Eine Kritik der Philosophie" ("Philosophy and the Mirror of Nature"), "Vergessenheit" ("Oblivion)", and "TV der Leiden" ("The Suffering Channel").
