= Mark Costello (author) =

American writer

Mark Costello (October 25, 1936 – July 3, 2023), a native of Decatur, Illinois, is the author of the story collections The Murphy Stories (University of Illinois Press, 1973), which won the St. Lawrence Award for Short Fiction, and Middle Murphy (University of Illinois Press, 1991). The Murphy Stories has received critical praise, and one of its stories, Murphy's Xmas, was anthologized in several collections.

Costello taught for many years at the University of Illinois at Urbana as a creative writing instructor and was a visiting writer at many universities and colleges. He held the Endowed Chair in Creative Writing at the University of Alabama at Tuscaloosa and was writer-in-residence at the University of Iowa Writers Workshop for one year.

His story Room 601 has received praise. Costello is known for his brevity and the introspective nature of his characters. The stories are set in central Illinois and feature a hard-drinking, hard-living character, Michael Murphy.

Costello's work has appeared in literary magazines and anthologies, including The Norton Anthology of Short Fiction, The Norton Anthology of Contemporary Fiction, and Best American Short Stories.

He is not related to the Mark Costello who wrote Signifying Rappers: Rap and Race in the Urban Present (1990), with David Foster Wallace.

He died in Lakewood, Colorado, on Monday, July 3, 2023.
