= Glenn Kenny =

American film critic and journalist

- Born: August 8, 1959 (age 67); United States
- Education: William Paterson University
- Occupations: Film critic; editor; blogger; actor

Glenn Kenny (born August 8, 1959) is an American film critic and journalist. He writes for The New York Times and RogerEbert.com.

== Biography ==
Kenny attended William Paterson University, where he majored in English literature.

He joined the staff of the film magazine Premiere in June 1996, after having worked as a freelance film and music critic for several publications, including The Village Voice. One of his first assignments for Premiere was to edit David Foster Wallace's "David Lynch Keeps His Head," later included in Wallace's essay collection A Supposedly Fun Thing I'll Never Do Again.

Kenny served as a critic and editor at Premiere until it ceased publication in 2007. He later became the chief critic for MSN before joining The New York Times. He has also written for The Los Angeles Times, Rolling Stone, and Entertainment Weekly.

Kenny has edited an anthology on Star Wars and written a monograph on actor Robert de Niro for the French film magazine Cahiers du cinéma. He also had acting roles in Steven Soderbergh's The Girlfriend Experience (2009) and Preston Miller's God's Land (2010).

Kenny participated in the 2012 Sight & Sound critics' poll, where he listed his ten favorite films as Anatomy of a Murder, Belle de Jour, Boudu Saved from Drowning, Céline and Julie Go Boating, Citizen Kane, Dr. Mabuse the Gambler, Psycho, The Searchers, Singin' in the Rain, and Stalker.
