= The Broom of the System =

1987 novel by David Foster Wallace

- Author: David Foster Wallace
- Language: English
- Genre: Literary fiction
- Publisher: Viking Press
- Publication date: January 6, 1987
- Publication place: United States
- Media type: Hardcover, paperback
- Pages: 467
- ISBN: 0-14-200242-9
- OCLC: 55873635
- Dewey Decimal: 813/.54 22
- LC Class: PS3573.A425635 B7 2004

The Broom of the System is the first novel by the American writer David Foster Wallace, published in 1987.

== Background ==
Wallace submitted the novel as one of two undergraduate honors theses at Amherst College, the other being a paper on Richard Taylor's fatalism. He had begun study in philosophy at Amherst, interested in math and logic, and developed an interest in Ludwig Wittgenstein before beginning the novel. A professor commented that Wallace's philosophy writing tended to have the quality of an unfolding story, leading Wallace to explore literature. Having submitted Broom of the System to the Department of English, he decided to focus his career on fiction. Broom was published in 1987 as Wallace completed a Master of Fine Arts in creative writing at the University of Arizona. He had also sold his first short-story collection Girl with Curious Hair.

Wallace stated that the initial idea for the novel sprang from a remark made by an old girlfriend. DT Max reported that, according to Wallace, she said "she would rather be a character in a piece of fiction than a real person. I got to wondering just what the difference was."

Wallace revealed in an interview that the novel was somewhat autobiographical: "the sensitive tale of a sensitive young WASP who's just had this midlife crisis that's moved him from coldly cerebral analytic math to a coldly cerebral take on fiction... which also shifted his existential dread from a fear that he was just a 98.6°F calculating machine to a fear that he was nothing but a linguistic construct."

== Plot summary ==
The book centers on the comparatively normal Lenore Beadsman, a 24-year-old telephone switchboard operator who gets caught in the middle of a Cleveland-based character drama. Lenore deals with three separate crises: her great-grandmother's escape from a nursing home, a neurotic boyfriend, and a suddenly vocal pet cockatiel. The controlling idea surrounding all of these crises is the use of words and symbols to define a person. To illustrate this idea, Wallace uses different formats to build the story, including transcripts from television recordings and therapy sessions, as well as an accompanying fictional account written by one of the main characters, Rick Vigorous.

The manager of the nursing home, David Bloemker, repeatedly expresses himself in an overly elaborate style, only to have to reduce his own locutions to a much simpler form. For example, he tells Lenore that if they find her great-grandmother (also named Lenore), they will likely also find the other missing residents of the facility. Why? Because, she "enjoyed a status here — with the facility administration, the staff, and, through the force of her personality and her evident gifts, especially with the other residents [such that] it would not be improper to posit the location and retrieval of Lenore as near assurance of retrieving the other misplaced parties." The younger Lenore says that she doesn't understand all of that. Bloemker tries again: "Your great-grandmother was more or less the ringleader around here." This contrast of baroque with simple speech is employed to comic effect, as well as to advance the more serious contemplation of language at the heart of the plot.

=== Major characters ===
Many secondary characters are not included here.

- Lenore Beadsman: The story's protagonist.
- Rick Vigorous: Lenore's boyfriend, co-owner of the publishing house Frequent & Vigorous inside the Bombardini Building.
- Patrice LaVache Beadsman: Married to Stonecipher Beadsman III, with whom she has four children: John, Clarice, Lenore, and Stonecipher.
- Norman Bombardini: Owner of the Bombardini Building and the Bombardini Company. He believes that he can encompass the entire universe by eating obscene quantities of food, and then everything else. He becomes infatuated with Lenore.
- Stonecipher Beadsman III: Married to Patrice Beadsman, with whom he has four children: John, Clarice, Lenore, and Stonecipher. He is in charge of the company Stonecipheco.
- Vlad the Impaler, later Ugolino the Significant: Vlad is a cockatiel, and was a gift to Lenore Beadsman from Rick Vigorous. Vlad began frequently repeating phrases he heard others say, possibly after being given either an experimental baby food or LSD.
- David Bloemker: The director of the Shaker Heights nursing home when residents and staff go missing.
- Melinda Susan Metalman Lang, or Mindy Metalman, or Melinda-Sue: Childhood neighbour of Rick Vigorous. She was roommates with Clarice Beadsman at Mount Holyoke College where she met her husband, Andrew Lang.
- Andrew Sealander Lang, Wang-Dang Lang, W.D.L., or Andy: Married to Mindy Metalman. Speaks in an overblown Texan dialect. Once worked on the Great Ohio Desert (G.O.D.), Andy is hired by Rick Vigorous as a translator of "idiomatic Greek".
- Stonecipher LaVache Beadsman IV, LaVache, the Antichrist, or Stoney: Brother of Lenore and a current student of Amherst College, where he is nicknamed "the Antichrist" for his devilish appearance. LaVache has had an artificial leg since birth.

== Themes ==
A recurring concept in The Broom of the System is psychology as relating to words; many of the theories discussed involve Ludwig Wittgenstein's ideas and principles. Wallace himself stated that the book can be viewed as a dialogue between Wittgenstein and Derrida.

== Reception ==
The publication earned Wallace the Whiting Award in 1987.

Caryn James of the New York Times criticized elements of the book, writing in her review:

The philosophical underpinnings of his novel are [...] weak. [...] There is too much flat-footed satire of Self and Other, too much reliance on Philosophy 101. [...] And the novel falls off drastically at the end, when a tortured running joke turns into a contrived explanation and characters we expect to appear never show up.

Despite these perceived short-comings, she ultimately found strength in the writing:

But the author's narrative command carries him over the low spots. This is not, after all, a minimalist tightrope-walk where a few wrong choices can produce empty posturing instead of precisely understated fiction. A saving grace of excessive novels is that a few missteps hardly matter; The Broom of the System succeeds as a manic, human, flawed extravaganza.

In the same newspaper, Michiko Kakutani wrote a somewhat unfavorable review, calling it "an unwieldy, uneven work - by turns, hilarious and stultifying, daring and derivative". Praising the author's ambition and imagination, she wrote that "the reader intermittently feels that the author wants to use Lenore's story as a Nabokovian armature on which to drape serious philosophical and literary discussions. The problem is that [...] 'The Broom of the System' is pock-marked with superfluous verbal riffs [...] repetitious digressions, and nonsensical babbling that reads like out-takes from a stoned, late-night dormitory exchange." Kakutani claimed Wallace has a "story-telling gift" but recommended more "narrative discipline and the exchange of other writers's [sic] voices for a more original vision."

Robert Asahina of Los Angeles Times wrote a review that parodies the style of the book itself, and wrote that "writers have abdicated responsibility for meaning to readers [...] the book essentially seems to be about itself, 'a game consisting of involved attempts to find out the game's own rules,' and not about Lenore". Asahina suggested that coincidence is "an all-too-convenient plot device" in the book, and that those who were not fans of metafiction would likely find it "consistently, off-puttingly pretentious".

A reviewer for Kirkus Reviews argued that Wallace "is something of a puerile Pynchon, a discount Don DeLillo [...] Wallace dabbles in big ideas, with too many pseudo-Wittgensteinian pauses [...] and much callow satire on consumer/evangelical America. Despite flashes of real genius, it's a heady Animal House vision."

In 2011, Tori Schacht of The Rumpus praised the irony of the ending and wrote, "This is Wallace in the nascent stage of his literary powers, attempting to reconcile his interest in Wittgenstein and language with his desire to speak of something urgent and true about us and our beautiful messes."
