= Inverse cost and quality law =

Observation about Hollywood filmmaking

The inverse cost and quality law attempts to formalize any Hollywood cinema production characterized by a large budget and, by negative correlation, poorly perceived critical attributes. American writer David Foster Wallace coined the term and established the genre's attributes, symptoms or diagnostic features in a 1998 article titled, "F/X Porn" by which Wallace primarily critiques the weaknesses of Terminator 2: Judgment Day (1991), a blockbuster film directed by James Cameron.

== Overview ==
David Foster Wallace, in a 1998 essay first appearing in Waterstone's Magazine and later anthologized in the essay collection Both Flesh and Not, argued:

"T2" is thus also the first and best instance of a paradoxical law that appears to hold true for the entire F/X Porn genre. It is called the Inverse Cost and Quality Law, and it states very simply that the larger a movie's budget is, the shittier that movie is going to be. The case of "T2" shows that much of the ICQL's force derives from simple financial logic. A film that would cost hundreds of millions of dollars to make is going to get financial backing if and only if its investors can be maximally – maximally – sure that at the very least they will get their hundreds of millions of dollars back – i.e. a megabudget movie must not fail (and "failure" here means anything less than a runaway box-office hit) and must thus adhere to certain reliable formulae that have been shown by precedent to maximally ensure a runaway hit.

Despite the dislike by Wallace, Terminator 2: Judgment Day is critically acclaimed. It won four Academy Awards, and review aggregator Rotten Tomatoes reports 92% positive reviews.
