= Commencement speech =

Speech given to graduating students

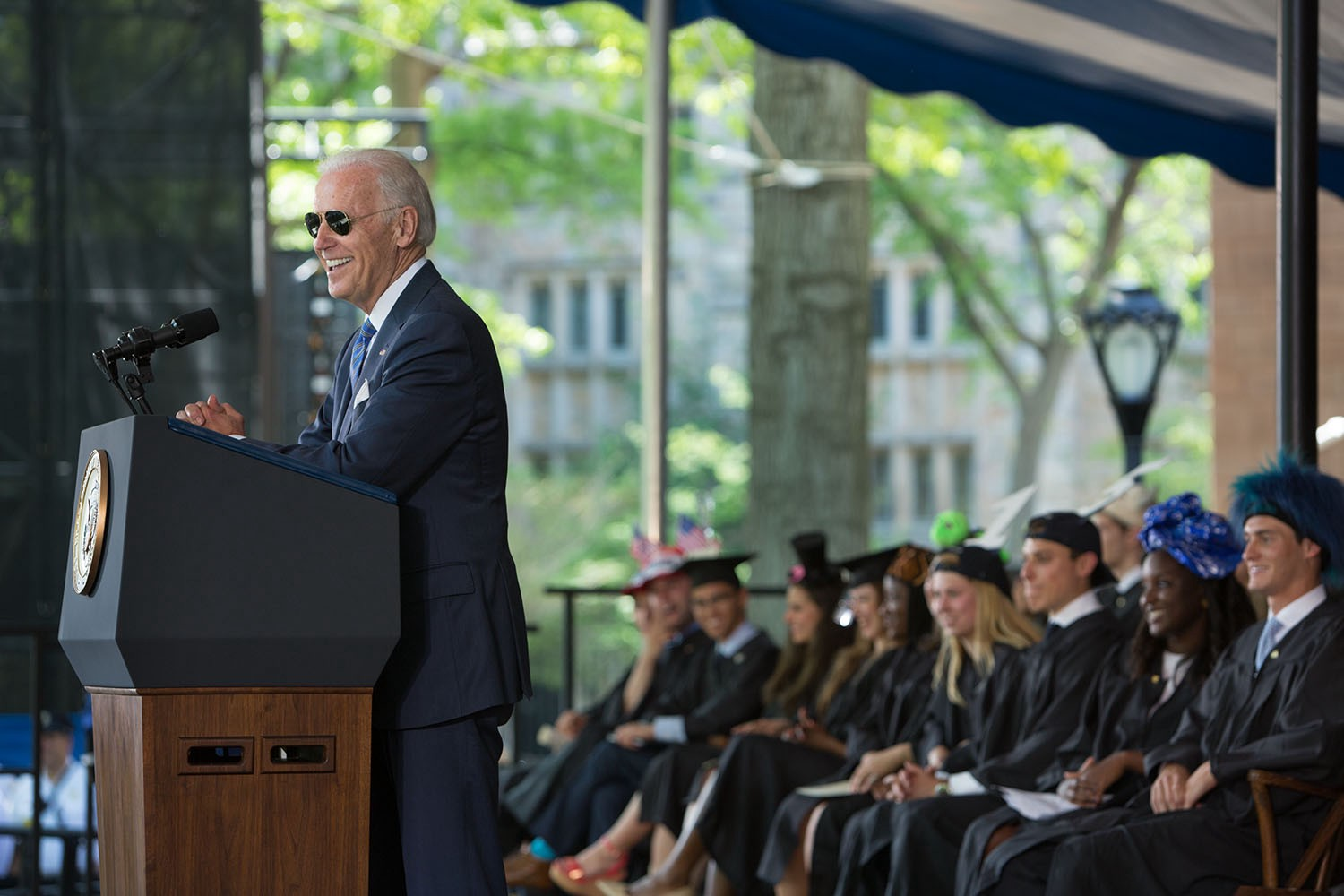
Then-Vice President Joe Biden delivering a commencement speech to the graduating class of 2015 at Yale University

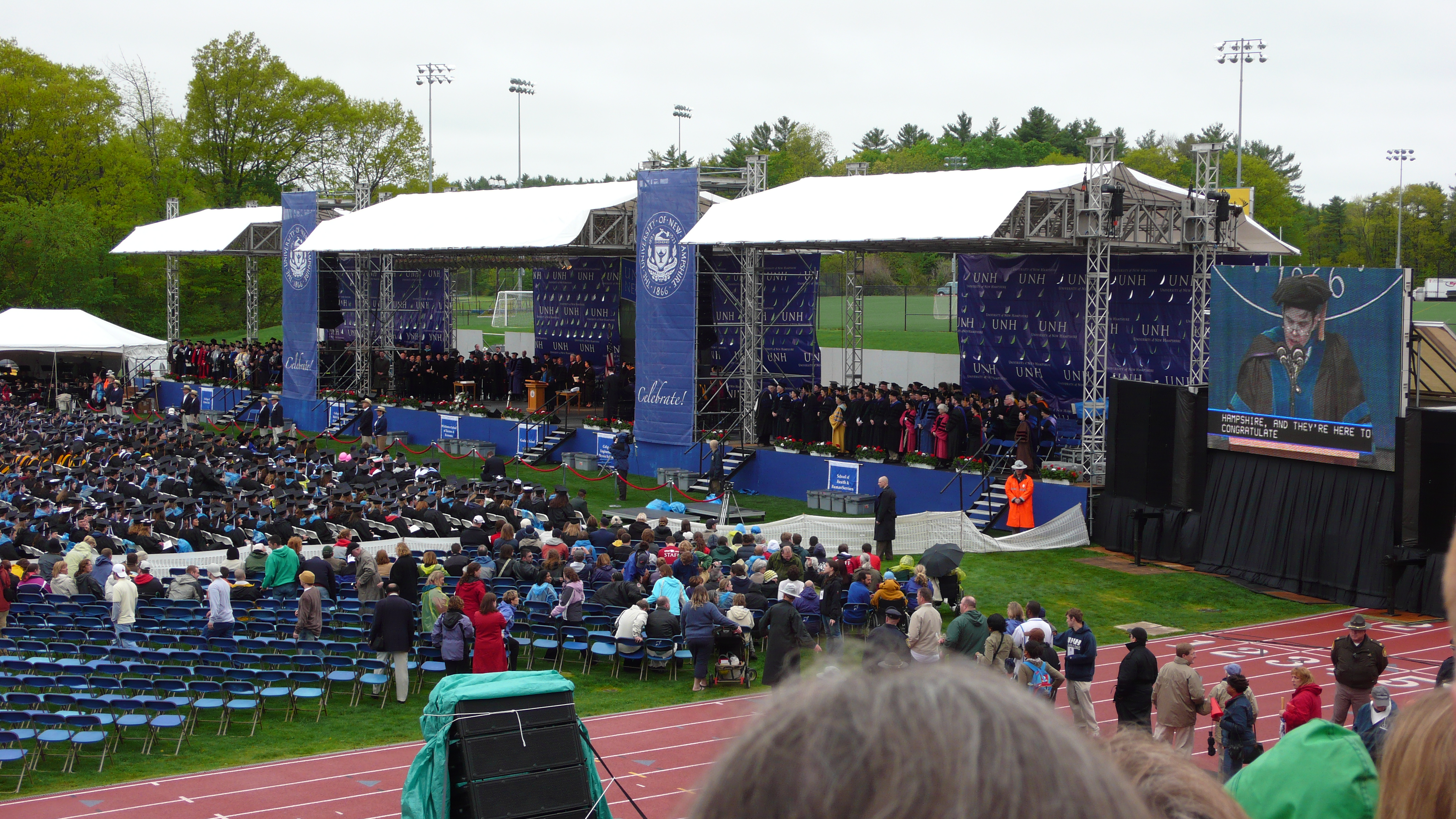
The University of New Hampshire commencement in 2007, at which George H. W. Bush and Bill Clinton spoke

In the United States, a commencement speech or commencement address is a speech given to graduating students, generally at a college or university, although the term is also used for secondary education institutions and in similar institutions around the world.

The commencement is a ceremony in which degrees or diplomas are conferred upon graduating students. A commencement speech is typically given by a notable figure in the community or a graduating student. The person giving such a speech is known as a commencement speaker. Very commonly, colleges or universities will invite politicians, important citizens, or other noted speakers to come and address the graduating class.

A student speaker may deliver remarks either in lieu or in conjunction with a notable outside figure. Student commencement speakers are often valedictorians or may otherwise be elected by their peers to represent the student body.

Despite meaning "beginning", commencement may be mistaken to mean "ending" due to its association with the end of one's studies. Its usage originated with students finishing their studies and being awarded a degree, thus commencing as bachelors or masters in a subject and enjoying new privileges within academia.

== Notable commencement speeches ==
- Winston Churchill at Harrow School in 1941
- George C. Marshall at Harvard University in 1947: the Marshall Plan
- John F. Kennedy's American University speech in 1963
- Richard Feynman at the California Institute of Technology in 1974: "Cargo cult science"
- Joseph Brodsky at the University of Michigan in 1988: "Speech at the Stadium"
- Steve Jobs at Stanford University in 2005
- David Foster Wallace at Kenyon College in 2005: "This Is Water"

== See also ==
- Graduation
- Speech
