= Something to Do with Paying Attention =

Posthumous novella by David Foster Wallace

- 2022 book cover
- Author: David Foster Wallace
- Language: English
- Subject: United States. Internal Revenue Service--Fiction. Accountants--Fiction. Civil service--Fiction. Nineteen seventies--Fiction. Illinois--Fiction. Confessional fiction. Bildungsromans. Novellas.
- Genre: Literary fiction, Satire
- Set in: 1970s Illinois
- Publisher: McNally Editions and Simon & Schuster
- Publication date: April 5, 2022
- Publication place: United States
- Media type: Print paperback
- Pages: 152
- ISBN: 9781946022271 1946022276
- OCLC: 1302877293
- Preceded by: The Pale King
- Website: Official website

Something to Do with Paying Attention is a novella excerpted from The Pale King and touted as David Foster Wallace's final work of fiction by The New Yorker. It was published by McNally Editions and distributed by Simon & Schuster on April 5, 2022.

== About the novella ==
The preface is by Sarah McNally, the book's editor and seller. Wallace's unfinished novel The Pale King contains a character named Chris Fogle. Fogle's wide-ranging monologue (The Pale King's most extensive segment, according to McNally) was extracted to become this novella. McNally also says this novella is "not just a complete story, but the best concrete example we have of Wallace’s late style, where calm and poise replace the pyrotechnics of Infinite Jest and other early works."

Wallace himself considered publishing this part of The Pale King as a completed work, because he was acutely aware of his difficulty completing The Pale King to his satisfaction, and because he worried a long stretch of time had passed since his last published novel in 1996.

According to Jonathan Russel Clark, who reviewed this book for the Los Angeles Times, McNally explains that she published this book for readers unfamiliar with Wallace's work and its complexity, calling it "a perfect place to start".

=== Background ===
The Pale King was assembled from an extensive collection of papers and some floppy disks Wallace left behind that had accumulated for about ten years, since about 1996. According to Jon Baskin, the New Yorker's reviewer of this novella, Wallace "left a pile of papers, spiral notebooks, three-ring binders, and floppy disks on a table in his garage. The collection of notes, outlines, prose fragments, character sketches, and partial chapters reportedly ran to hundreds of thousands of words".

=== Reception ===
In a 2022 review published by the Los Angeles Times, Jonathan Russel Clark writes that the novella "has the rhythm of waves on a beach as high tide approaches: forward movement before pulling back, all the while inching farther up the sand", and "For all his virtuosity, Wallace specialized in erudite neurotics from Middle America who suffer from various degrees of mental illness. These are the characters he wrote best because they came from his own experience."

In a 2023 article for the London Review of Books, Patricia Lockwood called the novella "enthralling" and wrote: "It is the first time his nostalgia sounded adult to me, looking back at childhood not just as the site of personal formation but as the primal experience of bureaucracy: queues, signs, your own name on the line, textures of waiting-room chairs. Waiting to become what, a person."
