= Both Flesh and Not =

2012 collection of essays by David Foster Wallace

Both Flesh and Not: Essays
- First edition hardcover
- Author: David Foster Wallace
- Cover artist: Marie Mundaca
- Language: English
- Genre: Non-fiction; essay
- Publisher: Little, Brown and Company
- Publication date: November 6, 2012 (U.S.)
- Publication place: United States
- Media type: Print (hardback)
- Pages: 336
- ISBN: 978-0-316-18237-9
- Preceded by: The Pale King

Both Flesh and Not: Essays is a collection of fifteen essays by American author David Foster Wallace published posthumously in 2012. It is Wallace's third essay collection.

== List of essays ==
Printed between each essay are lists of obscure words and their definitions that Wallace kept.

- "Federer Both Flesh and Not" (written in 2006) describes professional tennis at its pinnacle through an examination of the talent of Roger Federer. The essay was first published in The New York Times as "Roger Federer as Religious Experience" in 2006.
- "Fictional Futures and the Conspicuously Young" (1988), first appeared in Review of Contemporary Fiction (1988). As the book's publisher notes in the back matter, "Some of the ideas and language in this essay appear in 'E Unibus Pluram,' [from] A Supposedly Fun Thing I'll Never Do Again."
- "The Empty Plenum: David Markson’s Wittgenstein's Mistress" (1990) appeared in Review of Contemporary Fiction, 1990. Wallace very positively reviews David Markson's experimental novel Wittgenstein's Mistress (1988).
- "Mr. Cogito" is a positive review of a book of poetry by Zbigniew Herbert. It is a short piece that appeared in Spin in 1994.
- "Democracy and Commerce at the U.S. Open" (1996) is a first-person journalistic essay on the 1995 U.S. Open. It was written for Tennis magazine.
- "Back in New Fire" (1996), on sex in the age of AIDS. It was first published as "Impediments to Passion" in Might magazine, 1996.
- "The (As It Were) Seminal Importance of Terminator 2" (1998) bemoans the effect of large visual effects budgets on the movie industry. First published as "F/X Porn" in Waterstone’s Magazine, 1998.
- "The Nature of the Fun" (1998), a reflection on writing fiction, was published in Fiction Writer, 1998.
- "Overlooked: Five Direly Underappreciated U.S. novels >1960" appeared on Salon.com in 1999. Wallace mentions Omensetter’s Luck by William H. Gass (1966); Steps by Jerzy Kosiński (1968); Angels by Denis Johnson (1983); Blood Meridian: Or the Evening Redness in the West by Cormac McCarthy (1985); and Wittgenstein's Mistress by David Markson (1988).
- "Rhetoric and the Math Melodrama" (2000) is a review of Philibert Schogt's The Wild Numbers and Apostolos Doxiadis's Uncle Petros & Goldbach’s Conjecture. It was published in Science.
- "The Best of the Prose Poem" is a review of The Best of The Prose Poem: An International Journal published in Rain Taxi (2001).
- "Twenty-Four Word Notes" (2004) is reprinted from the Oxford American Writer’s Thesaurus.
- "Borges on the Couch" (2004) is a mostly negative review of Edwin Williamson's Borges: A Life for the New York Times Book Review, arguing that Williamson incorrectly emphasizes the effect of Jorge Luis Borges' personal life and character on his stories.
- "Deciderization 2007—A Special Report" was published as the introduction to The Best American Essays 2007.
- "Just Asking" is a short political piece that appeared in The Atlantic in 2007.
