= Gerry Howard =

American book editor

Gerry Howard is an editor under Random House. He helped discover David Foster Wallace and helped edit his first two books. He also helped edit Hanya Yanagihara.
