= Good Old Neon =

2001 short story by David Foster Wallace

"Good Old Neon" is a short story by American writer David Foster Wallace. Originally published in the 37th issue of the literary journal Conjunctions in November 2001, it later appeared in Oblivion: Stories, a 2004 collection of Wallace's short stories. The story centers on an overachiever who considers himself "fraudulent," and the life events that culminate in his decision to commit suicide. The story contains themes about authenticity, neurobiology and the mind, language and logic, time, mysticism, and death.

The story was included in The O. Henry Prize Stories 2002, and Marshall Boswell wrote that it is Oblivion's "best and most celebrated stand-alone story".

== Plot summary ==
The majority of the story is told from the first-person perspective of a man in his late twenties named Neal (although his name is only mentioned once), who lives in Illinois and has a career as an advertising executive. The narrator declares that he has been a fraud his whole life, and that he only tries to create an impression of himself to be admired by others. He reveals that he has killed himself, and starts to recount some of the details of his life that led up to his suicide.

Before his death, the narrator had been going to weekly psychoanalysis sessions with an analyst named Dr. Gustafson. In one session, the narrator describes himself as self-centered and fraudulent to Dr. Gustafson, giving examples of times he has manipulated people to give a certain impression of himself. Dr. Gustafson replies that if he was truly a fraud, he would not be able to recognize this about himself, and therefore cannot be totally fraudulent or irredeemable. However, the narrator predicted that Dr. Gustafson would reply with this, and is disappointed, now believing he can also manipulate Dr. Gustafson to give a false impression that the therapy is working. In between this conversation, the narrator has a flashback to when he was four years old and had broken an antique bowl of his stepparents, and realized that if he confessed in an unconvincing and implausible way, it would appear that he was trying to take the blame, and they would punish his stepsister Fern instead. The narrator uses this brief flashback as an example of a split-second thought or "flash" in someone's mind that is too complicated to fully describe with words.

In future sessions with Dr. Gustafson, the narrator lists other times he was self-centered and manipulative, such as going from genuinely loving playing baseball as a child, to just being anxious and concerned about his game performance in high school. As an adult, he joined a charismatic church and became enthusiastic about the church's activities, but realized he was trying to appear to be the most devout person of the church. Another example is when he joined a meditation class, and was always able to remain still longer than any of the other students, but wasn't able to meditate at all in his house when no one was watching.

Here, the narrator gives a description of what dying is like, claiming that time no longer functions as usual, using the "flashes" of the mind and formal logic as metaphors.

As he keeps going to analysis sessions with Dr Gustafson, who is now terminally ill with colon cancer, he starts to feel some optimism about his situation. This changes when one evening, the narrator sees an episode of Cheers where a character jokes about a "yuppie [...] whining to me about how he can't love." (Note: The quote is originally from "Pudd'n Head Boyd", Season 6, Episode 9 of Cheers. The quote appears in the show as "Lord, if I hear one more yuppie snivel about his inability to love, I'll smack him", which was altered in Wallace's story.) Hearing this, the narrator loses hope, and he decides to end his life by driving his car into a bridge abutment. He composes a suicide note to his stepsister Fern, apologizing for any hurt he caused her. The narrator ruminates on how most of his actions now will be the last time he does something. As he starts driving into the bridge, the story transitions into second-person perspective, now describing "David Wallace" looking through his high school yearbook and seeing a photo of Neal. Wallace remembers hearing news of a car crash involving Neal and ponders what would've led him to take his life.

== Analysis ==
...one of [Dr. Gustafson's] basic operating premises was the claim that there were really only two basic, fundamental orientations a person could have toward the world, (1) love and (2) fear, and that they couldn't coexist (or, in logical terms, that their domains were exhaustive and mutually exclusive, or that their two sets had no intersection but their union comprised all possible elements, or that:

'(∀x) ((Fx → ~ (Lx)) & (Lx → ~ (Fx))) & ~ ((∃x) (~ (Fx) & ~ (Lx))' )

— David Foster Wallace, "Good Old Neon", a passage using the syntax of first-order logic

"Good Old Neon" contains many references to mathematical logic. In one section, the narrator describes the Berry paradox as an example of a logical paradox, and also uses paradoxes as a metaphor to describe his continued state of "fraudulence" despite his efforts to change. Mathematician Roberto Natalini likened the concept of language not being able to accurately capture thoughts to the difference in size between countable and uncountable sets.

Cory M. Hudson characterized "Good Old Neon" as "an exhaustive attempt to demonstrate the impermeability of the bounds of consciousness." Matt Prout described the story as centered on the problem of other minds.

The watch of the narrator's stepmother, inscribed with "Respice Finem" (translation: "consider the end"), is a reference to The Death of Ivan Ilyich by Leo Tolstoy. The original version of the story published in Conjuctions contained an epigraph with text from "Avatars of the Tortoise" by Jorge Luis Borges, although this was removed in the Oblivion version. Stephen J. Burn noted that the initials of "Good Old Neon" spells the word "gone".

== Reception ==
"Good Old Neon" was acclaimed on its publication and with the release of the Oblivion collection. Walter Kirn in his review of Oblivion for The New York Times described "Good Old Neon" as "the most personal and approachable of the stories in the new book" and that it poses the idea that "we are really just a bunch of shabby fakes cut off from our own and others' essential beings by the inadequacy of language". Michiko Kakutani (also writing for the New York Times) did not give opinions on "Good Old Neon" specifically but gave a mixed review of Oblivion as a whole, criticizing what she thought were "reams and reams of stream-of-consciousness musings [...] that feel more like the sort of free-associative ramblings served up in an analyst's office".

Chad Harbach called the story an "indisputable masterpiece", and David Lipsky wrote that it was "an astonishingly good story" in the footnotes of Although of Course You End Up Becoming Yourself, his memoir on Wallace.

== Adaptations ==
"Good Old Neon" was adapted into a stage play and performed by Ian Forester at the 2011 Hollywood Fringe Festival, produced by the Los Angeles independent theater company Needtheater.
