= Andy Holden (artist) =

British artist

Andy Holden (born 1982) is an artist whose work includes sculpture, large installations, painting, music, performance, animation and multi-screen videos. His work is often defined by very personal starting points used to arrive at more abstract, or universal philosophical questions.

== Early life ==
Holden was born in Blunham, Bedfordshire, England.

== Work ==
He came to national attention with his exhibition Art Now: Andy Holden (2010) at Tate Britain, for which he exhibited Pyramid Piece, an enormous knitted rock based on a piece of pyramid which he stole from the great pyramid of Giza as a boy, and then later returned.

Subsequent solo exhibitions of his work include Chewy Cosmos Thingly Time (2011) at Kettle's Yard, Cambridge, which featured "The Dan Cox Library for the Unfinished Concept of Thingly Time", a library of books and a display of sculptures dedicated to his friend and collaborator Dan Cox who died in an accident just before the exhibition was due to open. This was followed by Cookham Erratics at the Benaki Museum in Athens (2012), which was a series of knitted rocks containing hidden speakers that told a fragmented narrative. Holden's work Eyes in Space was included in Mark Leckey's 2013 touring show Universal Addressability of Dumb Things.

Holden was a founding member of a small, Bedford-based art-movement MI!MS (Maximum Irony! Maximum Sincerity), which was the subject of a solo exhibition at the Zabludowicz Collection and Spike Island in 2013 and 2014. This group's manifesto, written in 2003, which called for a coupling of irony and sincerity, has been noted as a precursor to metamodernism. Holden's later output has similarly often been described as balancing an ironic sensibility with a deep sincerity, underwritten by an often personal narrative. Holden often appears in the work in as a version of himself, promoting psychoanalyst Darian Leader to write in an essay in Frieze magazine that the artist "is inside and outside of the picture at the same time".

From 2011 until 2017 Holden worked on Laws of Motion in a Cartoon Landscape, described by The Art Newspaper as an "epic and widely acclaimed masterpiece". The work is an hour-long animated film, narrated by the artist as a cartoon character, in which the world is declared to have become a cartoon, and cartoon physics is used as a way of understanding the world. A later exhibition Structure of Feeling continued these ideas and could only be accessed by viewers riding motorised carts, taking the form of a theme park ride.

Cartoons features heavily in Holden's work, and in 2018 he was included in the exhibition Good Grief, Charlie Brown, at Somerset House which examined the legacy of Peanuts. In 2021 Holden was invited to curate the exhibition Beano: Art of Breaking the Rules, also at Somerset House. The exhibition explored the history of Beano and its influence on art and culture. It featured a special Beano comic strip commenting on the exhibition as well as contemporary artworks and archive materials.

In 2017 Holden collaborated with his father the ornithologist Peter Holden on the exhibition Natural Selection, commissioned by Artangel. The exhibition explored the sculptural properties of birds nests and the history of oology in Britain, as well as themes of parental influence, ideas of nature and nurture. The exhibition was given a five-star review by The Observer and toured to Leeds Art Gallery, Bristol Museum & Art Gallery, Towner Gallery in Eastbourne and four venues in Scotland and subsequently the films were acquired by the Tate Collection, Bristol Museum and Leeds Art Gallery. The book accompanying the exhibition includes an essay by nature writer Helen MacDonald.

For his contribution to British Art Show 9 (2022), and in his exhibition Full of Days, at The Gallery of Everything (2023), Holden presented a display of paintings by a previously unknown 'outsider' artist who signed her work 'Hermione'. A film that accompanied the paintings featured an animated version of Hermione telling her story and an interpretation of her paintings in relation to her battle with illness. The film also explored the idea of 'the time of the sick', continuing Holden's preoccupation with different experiences of time.

His work The Auguries: Last Call was installed outside Wakefield council buildings in 2023. It consisted of five stone plinths, each with a bronze sculpture on top, shaped as the wave-form of birdsongs. In November 2024 the bronze components of the sculpture were stolen.

Holden occasionally works in other genres and explores the overlaps of art into other areas. He has released a number of records with his band, The Grubby Mitts, which were played on BBC 6Music. In 2012, Holden adapted David Foster Wallace's Brief Interviews with Hideous Men for stage, performed at the Institute of Contemporary Arts, in London. In 2020 Holden curated the first retrospective of the artwork of alternative comedian Simon Munnery. Holden previously curated the first edition (2010) of Wysing Arts Centre's annual music festival, focusing on artist's music projects. In 2021 Slimvolume published a book of interviews with Holden under the title, Collected Free Labour.
