= James D. Wallace =

American philosopher and professor (1937–2019)

James Donald Wallace (May 21, 1937 – July 7, 2019) was an American philosopher. He was a professor of philosophy at the University of Illinois Urbana-Champaign for 49 years.

== Biography ==
Wallace was born in Troy, New York, on May 21, 1937.

He wrote several books on morality and ethics that draw on the American philosophical tradition of pragmatism, in particular the ethical theory of John Dewey. His works include Norms and Practices (2008), Ethical Norms, Particular Cases (1996), Moral Relevance and Moral Conflict (1988), Virtues and Vices (1978), and numerous articles.

Wallace taught a variety of subjects, including value theory, practical reasoning, social and political philosophy, bioethics, ancient Greek philosophy, and philosophy of art.

Wallace was the father of the novelist David Foster Wallace. He was an atheist.

Wallace died on July 7, 2019, in Tempe, Arizona, where he had lived since 2012.

== Education ==
Wallace graduated with a BA from Amherst College in 1959 and a PhD from Cornell University in 1963.

== See also ==
- List of American philosophers
- Pragmatic ethics
