= The Wild Numbers =

1998 short novel by Philibert Schogt

- Softcover edition
- Author: Philibert Schogt
- Original title: De wilde getallen
- Translator: Philibert Schogt
- Language: Dutch
- Subject: Novel
- Genre: Mathematical fiction
- Publication date: 1998
- Publication place: The Netherlands
- English publication date: 2000

The Wild Numbers is a mathematical fiction in the form of a short novel by Philibert Schogt, a Dutch philosopher and mathematician. It was first published in Dutch (as "De wilde getallen") in 1998; the English translation, prepared by Schogt himself, was published in 2000.

Through this work the author is trying to provide insights to the workings of a mathematics-obsessed mind. It is the story of a professor of mathematics who believes he has solved one of the great problems of mathematics: "Beauregard's Wild Number Problem" (a fictitious problem invented by Schogt for the novel).

== Plot ==
The narrator is Isaac Swift, a mathematics professor in a small college in an unnamed city in an unnamed country. Swift is in his mid-thirties and desperately trying to establish himself as a mathematician. A respected senior faculty of the mathematics department of the college has just given his seal of approval to Swift's paper describing a solution to "Beauregard's problem" of whether there are infinitely many "wild" numbers.

Beauregard had defined a number of deceptively simple operations, which, when applied to a whole number, at first resulted in fractions. But if the same steps were repeated often enough, the eventual outcome was once again a whole number. Or, as Beauregard cheerfully observed: “In all numbers lurks a wild number, guaranteed to emerge when you provoke them long enough”. — Philibert Schonk, 'The Wild Numbers'

Isaac is then accused of plagiarising the work of an older student, Leonard Vale. Vale's accusation was generally ignored because of his cranky behaviour in the department and his tendency to make tall claims on unsolved problems.

== Reception ==
Complete Review felt The Wild Numbers to be "fairly ambitious" and "a harmless, decent little entertainment", but also "a bit simplistic", with "anodyne descriptions and simply drawn characters", noting that although the novel "centers around mathematics" and "makes some amusing and vaguely realistic points about [the] warped world [of academia]", it "could equally well be about any other obsession, intellectual or otherwise," and concluding that it should have been longer.

Publishers Weekly praised Schogt as a "skillful and energetic storyteller", while stating that Swift's "struggle" with the Beauregard problem was "somewhat caricatured", and that despite his interactions with Vale being "memorabl[e]", there were "occasional moments when the narrative strains cartoonishly for a cheap laugh or incongruous physical humor."

Writing for the Mathematical Association of America, Fernando Q. Gouvêa praised the "many moments when [Schogt] gets it just right" and "the largely (...) satisfying way" that the book answers the questions it asks about Swift's life. Gouvêa did, however, fault "the subplot involving [Vale's] accusation" as "creaky and contrived", and "mostly a concession to the reader for whom the mathematical and personal stories are insufficiently interesting;" as well, he was bothered by the ambiguity as to where the novel takes place, by Swift's mention of quaternions and octonions while teaching an introductory-level algebra class, and by Schogt's neglect of the concept of peer review (in order for Swift's paper to appear in an issue of a "highly prestigious" academic journal, one of Swift's colleagues calls the journal's editor and arranges it).

In Science, David Foster Wallace was much harsher, bluntly calling it "downright bad", and adding that "the precise ways in which [the book is bad] will vary directly with how much an individual reader already knows [about mathematics]". Wallace stated that although he did not object to all the math in the book being "made up", he found that it was both "extremely important (and) extremely vague, comprising mostly repeated and contextless verbiage", such that it was evocative of "the absurd pseudo-jargon of bad, old low-budget sci fi movies". This, he posited, indicated that the book was aimed at "readers with little or no high-math background", who would either not know, or care, that the terminology was meaningless. He emphasized that although this is not in itself a flaw, a novel's "lack [of] technical depth or resonance" must be compensated for by "more traditionally literary qualities like plot, character, style", and that The Wild Numbers' "characters [are] mere 2D types" and its "plot [is] howlingly implausible". Wallace further criticized the quality of Schogt's translation of the novel from Dutch to English (including Schogt's decision to change the book's setting from Amsterdam to "some nameless U.S. college town") as "rudimentary at best" , "stiff and clunky", and "riddled with ESL-ish solecisms" (while conceding that "Schogt's original Dutch prose" might be of significantly higher quality).

== Origins ==
Schogt had initially planned to write about a mediocre mathematician who solves Fermat's Last Theorem; however, when he discussed this with a mathematician friend in 1992, the friend told him that this would be a bad idea because Fermat's Last Theorem was too complex for a mediocre mathematician to approach, and that therefore real mathematicians would be unable to take the novel seriously. When considering his friend's statement, Schogt realized that such a novel would also require substantial research on his part, both mathematical and historical. He therefore invented the Wild Number problem, which he deliberately did not define ("(t)he trick (...) was that I didn't specify what Beauregard's 'deceptively simple operations' were").

== Legacy ==
Although Schogt did not provide a precise enough definition of "wild number" for the Beauregard problem to be solvable, various mathematicians (including Jeffrey Lagarias and Floor van Lamoen) have attempted to replicate either the five-number sequence from the novel, or its described behavior.
