= Michael Pietsch =

American business executive

Michael Pietsch is an editor who was chief executive of Hachette Book Group from 2013 to 2024. He was previously an editor and publisher at Little, Brown and Company.

He was known for working with both literary and mass-market commercial authors. Among the authors he worked with are Malcolm Gladwell, Stephenie Meyer, James Patterson, David Sedaris, Donna Tartt, Stacy Schiff, David Baldacci, and Michael Connelly. He was known for being the editor of David Foster Wallace's Infinite Jest.

== Career ==
Early in his career, Pietsch worked at Harmony Books and Charles Scribner's Sons.

He joined Little, Brown in 1991. As a young editor he acquired a postmodern novel by a then little-known writer named David Foster Wallace for $80,000. He spent years urging Wallace to cut hundreds of pages from the manuscript and impose at more structure on the disparate plot strands. When the book, Infinite Jest, was finally published in 1996, it became a literary sensation.

He was chief executive of Hachette from 2013 to January 2024.
