= Consider the Lobster =

Collection of essays by David Foster Wallace

Consider the Lobster and Other Essays
- First edition hardcover
- Author: David Foster Wallace
- Cover artist: Yoori Kim
- Language: English
- Publisher: Little, Brown and Co.
- Publication date: December 13, 2005
- Publication place: United States
- Media type: Print (hardback, paperback)
- Pages: 343
- ISBN: 0-316-15611-6
- OCLC: 59360271

Consider the Lobster and Other Essays (2005) is a collection of essays by novelist David Foster Wallace. It is also the title of one of the essays, which was published in Gourmet magazine in 2004. The title alludes to Consider the Oyster by M. F. K. Fisher.

== Content ==
The list of essays is as follows:

"Big Red Son"
Wallace's account of his visit to the 15th edition of the AVN Awards, an event that has been dubbed the Academy Awards of pornographic film, and its associated AVN Expo. Originally published in the September 1998 issue of Premiere magazine as "Neither Adult Nor Entertainment" under the pseudonyms Willem R. deGroot and Matt Rundlet.
"Certainly the End of Something or Other, One Would Sort of Have to Think"
A review of John Updike's novel Toward the End of Time. Originally published as "John Updike, Champion Literary Phallocrat, Drops One; Is This Finally the End for Magnificent Narcissists?" in the October 12, 1997 issue of The New York Observer.
"Some Remarks on Kafka's Funniness from Which Probably Not Enough Has Been Removed"
Text of speech given by David Foster Wallace in March 1998 at a symposium sponsored by the PEN American Center in New York City to celebrate the publication of a new translation of Franz Kafka's 1920s novel The Castle by Schocken Books. Originally published as "Laughing with Kafka" in the July 1998 issue of Harper's Magazine.
"Authority and American Usage"
A 62-page review of Bryan A. Garner's A Dictionary of Modern American Usage. Wallace applies George Orwell's "Politics and the English Language" to grammar and the conditions of class and power in millennial American communication. While discussing the difference between descriptive and prescriptive grammar, Wallace digresses to discuss the legitimacy of Ebonics as opposed to "White male" standard English. Originally published as "Tense Present: Democracy, English and the Wars over Usage" in the April 2001 issue of Harper's Magazine.
"The View from Mrs. Thompson's"
Wallace's account of September 11 attacks as he experienced it in his hometown of Bloomington, Illinois, where he taught English at Illinois State University. To the surprise of many of his readers, Wallace refers to some of his neighbors as fellow church members; biographer D.T. Max would later reveal, however, that these were in fact members of Wallace's recovery group, and that Wallace referred to them as "friends from church" to protect their anonymity. Originally published in the October 25, 2001 issue of Rolling Stone.
"How Tracy Austin Broke My Heart"
A scathing review of tennis star Tracy Austin's autobiography, extending into a general critique of the mass-produced ghostwritten sports autobiographies then flooding the market. Originally published in the August 30, 1992 issue of The Philadelphia Inquirer.
"Up, Simba"
Wallace writes about John McCain's 2000 presidential campaign, riding the bus called "The Straight Talk Express". The title is what a television news cameraman covering the campaign says before hoisting his camera onto his shoulder. Originally published in the April 2000 issue of Rolling Stone as "The Weasel, Twelve Monkeys And The Shrub", and as an e-book through Random House's iPublish imprint; later republished in the context of the 2008 presidential race as "McCain's Promise". The essay won the 2001 National Magazine Award for Feature Writing.
"Consider the Lobster"
Originally published in the August 2004 issue of Gourmet magazine, this review of the 2003 Maine Lobster Festival generated some controversy among the readers of the culinary magazine. The essay is concerned with the ethics of boiling a creature alive in order to enhance the consumer's pleasure, including a discussion of a lobster's sensory neurons.
"Joseph Frank's Dostoevsky"
Review of Fyodor Dostoevsky's biography written by Stanford University professor Joseph Frank. Originally titled "Feodor's Guide" and published in the April 9, 1996 issue of The Village Voice.
"Host"
A profile of John Ziegler, a Los Angeles-based conservative talk radio show host who is obsessed with the O. J. Simpson murder case. Wallace examines the impact of Clear Channel-type media monopolies and the proliferation of talk radio on the way Americans talk, think, and vote. The profile was originally published in the April 2005 issue of The Atlantic, where it can be read online. The 2015 online version republishes the article in a form that recreates the original print version's annotations through interactive web design. Instead of accompanying the text with his trademark footnotes, the version of "Host" in Consider the Lobster featured arrows connecting tangential ideas on the page, mimicking the reading experience that online readers of the article might have had. The article was a finalist of the 2006 National Magazine Award for Profile Writing.

== Audiobook ==
An audiobook, read by Wallace himself, was published in 2005 by Time Warner Audiobooks. The three-CD set contains complete readings of the following essays: "Consider the Lobster", "The View from Mrs. Thompson's", "Big Red Son" and "How Tracy Austin Broke My Heart". An expanded edition containing all of the stories was published by Hachette Audio in 2017 with narration by both Wallace and Robert Petkoff.
