= Critique: Studies in Contemporary Fiction =

- Discipline: Contemporary fiction, literary theory, comparative literature
- Language: English
- Edited by: Geoffrey Green, Donald J. Greiner, Larry McCaffery

Publication details
- Former names: Studies in Modern Fiction; Studies in Contemporary Fiction
- History: 1956–present
- Publisher: Routledge
- Frequency: 5/year
- Open access: Hybrid

Standard abbreviations
- ISO 4: Crit.: Stud. Contemp. Fict.

Indexing
- ISSN: 0011-1619 (print); 1939-9138 (web)
- LCCN: sn2006001087
- OCLC no.: 1010677478

Links
- Journal homepage; Online access; Online archive

Critique: Studies in Contemporary Fiction is a peer-reviewed academic journal published five times per year by Routledge. It focuses on critiques of contemporary fiction from any country, with coverage since the 1950s. It also focuses on new authors with emerging reputations in the contemporary fiction field within the same temporal coverage. The editors-in-chief are Geoffrey Green (San Francisco State University), Donald J. Greiner (University of South Carolina), and Larry McCaffery (San Diego State University).

== Abstracting and indexing ==
This journal is abstracted and indexed by the following databases:

- Academic Search Premier
- Arts & Humanities Citation Index
- Current Contents/Arts and Humanities
- International Bibliography of Periodical Literature
- Modern Language Association Database
- Scopus
