= Philibert Schogt =

Dutch writer

Philibert Schogt (born 1960) is a Dutch writer. He was born in Amsterdam, but grew up in the United States and Canada. He studied philosophy and mathematics at the University of Amsterdam. He is best known for his novels De wilde getallen and Daalder. His work has been translated into English, German, Greek, Italian, Turkish and Korean.
