= Everything and More (book) =

2003 book by David Foster Wallace

Everything and More: A Compact History of Infinity
- First Edition hardcover
- Author: David Foster Wallace
- Language: English
- Genre: Mathematics
- Published: October 2003 W. W. Norton & Company
- Publication place: United States
- Media type: Print (hardback, paperback)
- Pages: 336 pp
- ISBN: 0393003388

Everything and More: A Compact History of Infinity is a book by American novelist and essayist David Foster Wallace that examines the history of infinity, focusing primarily on the work of Georg Cantor, the 19th-century German mathematician who created set theory. The book is part of the W. W. Norton "Great Discoveries" series.

Neal Stephenson provided an "Introduction" to a reissued paperback edition (2010), which Stephenson reprinted in his collection Some Remarks: Essays and Other Writing.

Reviewers, including Rudy Rucker, A.W. Moore and Michael Harris, have criticized its style and mathematical content.
