= Caryn James =

American film critic and novelist

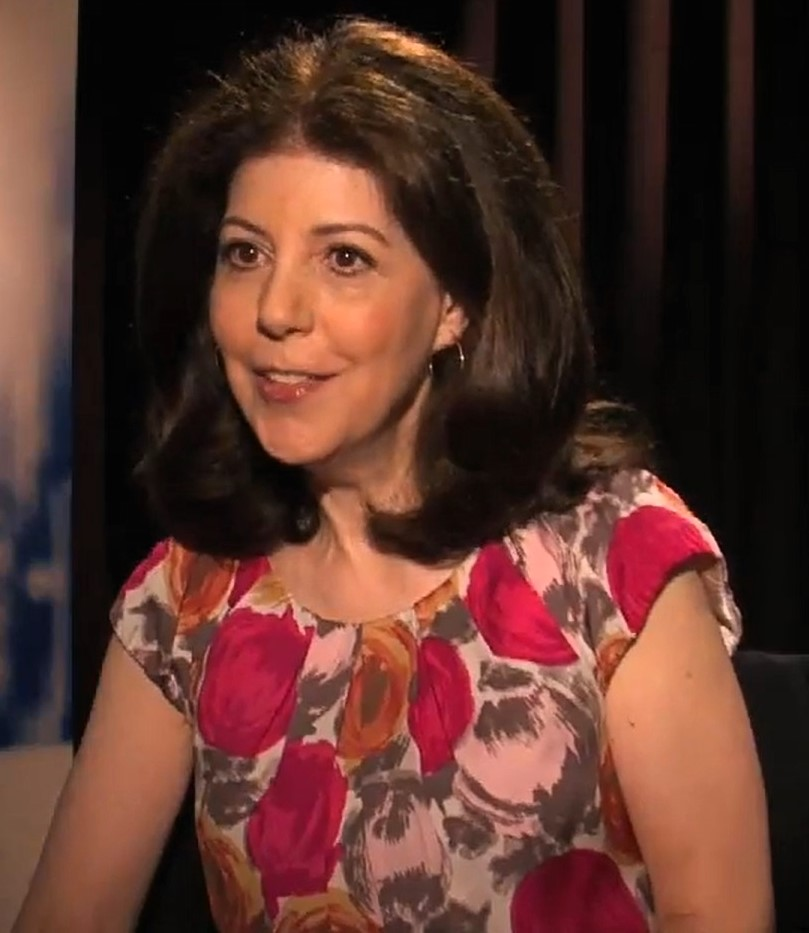
- James in 2011
- Born: United States
- Education: Brown University
- Occupations: Film critic; journalist; writer

Caryn James is an American film critic, journalist, university lecturer, and writer.

== Biography ==
She grew up in Providence, Rhode Island, and obtained her doctorate in English literature at Brown University. She began working as a freelance journalist at The New York Times; Newsday; TV Guide; and Vogue. She finally landed a three-week temporary position at The New York Times Book Review and later became a permanent staff member.

She moved to the daily newspaper, as a cultural reporter. In 1995, she began working as a television critic and in 1997, James was named by the Times as its first chief television critic. A year later, she published her first novel, Glorie, to good reviews.

In 2006, she published her second novel, What Caroline Knew: A Novel, and by 2010, had left the Times, returning to film critiques. She then began working at Marie Claire magazine while also doing freelance work. The following year, James began working with IndieWire in a division created for her James on Screens. She writes for The Wall Street Journal and The Hollywood Reporter, and in 2025 served as an adjunct professor in film studies at Columbia University.

== Selected works ==
- James, Caryn (1998). Glorie: A Novel. Zoland Books. ISBN 978-0-944072-87-5.
- James, Caryn (March 7, 2006). What Caroline Knew: A Novel. St. Martin's Press. ISBN 978-0-312-34312-5.
