= The Pale King =

2011 novel by David Foster Wallace

- Cover of first edition (US)
- Author: David Foster Wallace
- Audio read by: Robert Petkoff
- Cover artist: Karen Green
- Language: English
- Genre: Literary fiction
- Set in: Peoria, Illinois in 1985
- Publisher: Little, Brown & Co
- Publication date: April 15, 2011 (US)
- Publication place: United States
- Media type: Print (hardback)
- Pages: 548
- ISBN: 978-0-316-07423-0
- OCLC: 668192483
- Dewey Decimal: 813/.54
- LC Class: PS3573.A425635 P35 2011
- Preceded by: Fate, Time, and Language

The Pale King is an unfinished novel by David Foster Wallace, published posthumously on April 15, 2011. It was planned as Wallace's third novel, and the first since Infinite Jest in 1996, but it was not completed at the time of his death. Before his suicide in 2008, Wallace organized the manuscript and associated computer files in a place where they would be found by his widow, Karen Green, and his agent, Bonnie Nadell. That material was compiled by his friend and editor Michael Pietsch into the form that was eventually published. Wallace had been working on the novel for over a decade. Even incomplete, The Pale King is a long work, with 50 chapters of varying length totaling over 500 pages.

The novel was one of the three finalists for the 2012 Pulitzer Prize for Fiction, but no award was given that year.

== Overview ==
Like much of Wallace's work, the novel defies straightforward summary. Each chapter stands almost alone, with text ranging from straight dialogues between coworkers about civics or cartography to snippets of the 1985 Illinois tax code to poignant sensory or character sketches. Many of the chapters relate the experiences of a handful of employees of the Internal Revenue Service in Peoria, Illinois, in 1985. One of the characters, one of two who narrate their chapters, is named David Wallace, but he is a largely fictional counterpart of the author and not the focal point of the novel. Pietsch called the organization of the manuscript "a challenge like none I've ever encountered".

The fictional "Author's Foreword" is chapter 9 and is the place in the novel where Wallace's trademark footnotes run most rampant. In this chapter, he introduces the "irksome paradox" that the only bona fide fiction in the book is the copyright page's disclaimer that states "The characters and events in this book are fictitious," while at the same time acknowledging that this foreword itself is defined by that disclaimer as fictional. He further states, in the context of the same self-referential paradox, that "The Pale King is a kind of vocational memoir" and that "the very last thing this book is is some kind of clever metafictional titty-pincher." Other primary characters include Lane Dean Jr., Claude Sylvanshine, David Cusk, and Leonard Stecyk, men drawn for vastly different reasons to a career in the IRS.

== Writing, editing, and publication ==
Wallace began research for The Pale King in 1997, after the publication of Infinite Jest. He started writing the book around 2000. The novel (or "long thing", Wallace's usual term for it) had numerous working titles throughout this period, including Glitterer, SJF (Sir John Feelgood), Net of Gems, and What Is Peoria For?

In 2007, Wallace estimated that the novel was about one-third finished. One of his notebooks found by his widow, Karen Green (who designed the American edition's cover art), suggested a possible direction for the novel's plot: "...an evil group within the IRS is trying to steal the secrets of an agent who is particularly gifted at maintaining a heightened state of concentration." Wallace's ultimate intention for the plot is unknown.

In his final hours, Wallace "tidied up [his] manuscript so that his wife could find it. Below it, around it, inside his two computers, on old floppy disks in his drawers were hundreds of other pages—drafts, character sketches, notes to himself, fragments that had evaded his attempt to integrate them into the novel." On her blog, Kathleen Fitzpatrick wrote that the Pale King manuscript Michael Pietsch edited began with "more than 1000 pages... in 150 unique chapters". The published version is 540 pages and 50 chapters. (The paperback edition includes four additional scenes totaling 23 pages.)

On September 14, 2010, Pietsch announced the novel's publication date and provided further information about its plot, saying the book "takes agonizing daily events like standing in lines, traffic jams, and horrific bus rides—things we all hate—and turns them into moments of laughter and understanding", a theme Wallace addressed in his 2005 Kenyon College commencement speech. Pietsch added, "although David did not finish the novel, it is a surprisingly whole and satisfying reading experience that showcases his extraordinary imaginative talents and his mixing of comedy and deep sadness in scenes from daily life."

Although Little, Brown and Company set The Pale King's publication date for April 15, 2011 (Tax Day), Amazon.com and Barnes & Noble were allowed to sell copies on their websites as early as March 22, 2011. That elicited protest from many bookstore owners, who felt it put them at an unfair disadvantage. Little, Brown defended the split dates as common practice.

== Themes ==
Richard Rayner wrote in the Los Angeles Times that The Pale King's subjects are "loneliness, depression and the ennui that is human life's agonized bedrock, 'the deeper type of pain that is always there, if only in an ambient low-level way, and which most of us spend nearly all of our time and energy trying to distract ourselves from' [quoting Wallace]... The Pale King dares to plunge readers deep into this Dantean hell of 'crushing boredom,' suggesting that something good may lie beyond."

The story's central theme reflects that of Wallace's 2005 Kenyon College commencement speech, in which he encouraged his audience to be "conscious and aware enough to choose what you pay attention to and to choose how you construct meaning from experience".

== Reception ==
Jonathan Segura wrote in Publishers Weekly that The Pale King "isn't the era-defining monumental work we've all been waiting for since Infinite Jest altered the landscape of American fiction", but that it is "one hell of a document and a valiant tribute to the late Wallace".

In Esquire, Benjamin Alsup wrote that The Pale King is an "incomplete and weirdly fractured pseudo memoir" that is "frustratingly difficult in places" and "potholed throughout by narrative false starts and dead ends". But, he wrote, "you should read The Pale King". While conceding that the novel is not conventionally gripping in terms of narrative, Alsup wrote, "If it keeps you up at night, it won't be because you've got to know what happens next. If you're up, you'll be up because DFW writes sentences and sometimes whole pages that make you feel like you can't breathe."

In Time, Lev Grossman wrote: "if The Pale King isn't a finished work, it is, at the very least, a remarkable document, by no means a stunt or an attempt to cash in on Wallace's posthumous fame. Despite its shattered state and its unpromising subject matter, or possibly because of them, The Pale King represents Wallace's finest work as a novelist."

In The New York Times, Michiko Kakutani wrote that The Pale King "feels less like an incomplete manuscript than a rough-edged digest of the themes, preoccupations and narrative techniques that have distinguished [Wallace's] work from the beginning". She called the novel "breathtakingly brilliant and stupefying dull—funny, maddening and elegiac", and predicted that it "will be minutely examined by longtime fans for the reflexive light it sheds on Wallace's oeuvre and his life" and "snag the attention of newcomers, giving them a window—albeit a flawed window—into this immensely gifted writer's vision of the human condition as lived out in the middle of the middle of America". Kakutani called the novel Wallace's "most emotionally immediate work".

John Jeremiah Sullivan wrote a long, admiring appreciation of the novel in GQ Magazine.

David Hering's book David Foster Wallace: Fiction and Form features a lengthy section on the novel's evolution from its genesis to Pietsch's final version. Part of this was excerpted in the Los Angeles Review of Books in September 2016.

As stated above, the novel was one of the three finalists for the 2012 Pulitzer Prize for Fiction; no award was given that year.

== Awards and secondary scholarly literature ==
The novel received the 2011 Salon Book Award (Fiction).

The first academic conference about the book, "Work in Process: Reading David Foster Wallace's The Pale King", took place at the University of Antwerp in Belgium from September 22 to 23, 2011. Organized by Toon Staes, the conference consisted of two days of papers and discussions about the novel by numerous scholars. Notable speakers included Wallace scholars Marshall Boswell, Adam Kelly, and Stephen J. Burn.

In 2012, the journal Studies in the Novel published a volume of scholarship on The Pale King. Edited by Wallace scholar Marshall Boswell, the issue contains seven articles by fellow Wallace scholars and a review of a collection of Wallace scholarship. The following articles were included:

- Boswell, Marshall (2012). "Introduction: David Foster Wallace's The Pale King". Studies in the Novel. 44 (4): 367–370. doi:10.1353/sdn.2012.0042. JSTOR 23408625. S2CID 170103592. Project MUSE 498622.
- Burn, Stephen J. (2012). ""A Paradigm for the Life of Consciousness": Closing Time in The Pale King". Studies in the Novel. 44 (4): 371–388. doi:10.1353/sdn.2012.0044. JSTOR 23408626. S2CID 162368500. Project MUSE 498623.
- Warren, Andrew (2012). "Narrative Modeling and Community Organizing in The Pale King and Infinite Jest". Studies in the Novel. 44 (4): 389–408. doi:10.1353/sdn.2012.0046. JSTOR 23408627. S2CID 170231264. Project MUSE 498624.
- Staes, Toon (2012). "Rewriting the Author: A Narrative Approach to Empathy in Infinite Jest and The Pale King". Studies in the Novel. 44 (4): 409–427. doi:10.1353/sdn.2012.0038. JSTOR 23408628. S2CID 170404419. Project MUSE 498625.
- Clare, Ralph (2012). "The Politics of Boredom and the Boredom of Politics in David Foster Wallace's The Pale King". Studies in the Novel. 44 (4): 428–446. doi:10.1353/sdn.2012.0039. JSTOR 23408629. S2CID 170776607. Project MUSE 498626.
- Wouters, Conley (2012). "'What Am I, a Machine?': Humans, Information, and Matters of Record in David Foster Wallace's The Pale King". Studies in the Novel. 44 (4): 447–463. doi:10.1353/sdn.2012.0040. JSTOR 23408630. S2CID 161132074. Project MUSE 498627.
- Boswell, Marshall (2012). "Trickle-Down Citizenship: Taxes and Civic Responsibility in David Foster Wallace's The Pale King". Studies in the Novel. 44 (4): 464–479. doi:10.1353/sdn.2012.0041. JSTOR 23408631. S2CID 153381543. Project MUSE 498628.
- Hayes-Brady, Clare (2012). "The Legacy of David Foster Wallace by Samuel Cohen and Lee Konstantinou (review)". Studies in the Novel. 44 (4): 481–482. doi:10.1353/sdn.2012.0043. JSTOR 23408632. S2CID 161576791. Project MUSE 498629.

== Published excerpts ==
Several excerpts from The Pale King appeared in magazines prior to the book's publication:

- "Peoria (4)", in the Fall 2002 issue of TriQuarterly
- "Good People", in the February 5, 2007, issue of The New Yorker.
- "The Compliance Branch", in the February 2008 issue of Harper's.
- "Wiggle Room", in the March 9, 2009, issue of The New Yorker.
- "A New Examiner", in the January 2010 issue of The Lifted Brow and the September 2010 issue of Harper's.
- "Backbone", in the March 7, 2011 issue of The New Yorker.
- "The Pale King," an extract from chapter 22, in the April 9, 2011 issue of the Sunday Review section of The Guardian.

Before the novel's publication, there was some speculation that two of the short stories included in Oblivion—"Incarnations of Burned Children" and "The Soul is Not a Smithy"—might have been excerpts from The Pale King, but they did not appear in the final book; however, Wallace scholar Nick Maniatis has confirmed that "Incarnations of Burned Children" was part of "some of the earliest work on The Pale King". The short story "All That", published in the December 14, 2009, issue of The New Yorker, was also widely assumed to be an excerpt from The Pale King, but does not appear in the book.
