= Girl with Curious Hair =

1989 collection of short stories by David Foster Wallace

- First edition
- Author: David Foster Wallace
- Language: English
- Publisher: W. W. Norton & Company
- Publication date: August 17, 1989
- Publication place: United States
- Media type: Print (hardback & paperback)
- Pages: 373pp
- ISBN: 0-349-11102-2

Girl with Curious Hair is a collection of short stories by American writer David Foster Wallace, first published in 1989. Though the stories are not related, several reflect Wallace's concern with contemporary trends in fiction, including metafiction and the irony of postmodernism; and the cynical, amoral realism of "Brat Pack" writers such as Bret Easton Ellis. Others address society's fascination with celebrity, some with characters based on real people, including Alex Trebek, David Letterman and Lyndon Johnson. A novella, "Westward the Course of Empire Takes Its Way", closes the book, as an extended response to John Barth's metafictional short story "Lost in the Funhouse".

== List of stories ==
- "Little Expressionless Animals" revolves around a unique winning streak on the TV game show Jeopardy!, and the coming together of two lesbians with abnormal childhoods.
- "Luckily the Account Representative Knew CPR", in which two executives at an unnamed corporation meet in the underground parking lot while leaving late, and the senior executive suddenly has a heart attack.
- "Girl with Curious Hair". A sadistic young Republican lawyer who associates with punk rockers spends an evening with his drugged friends at a Keith Jarrett concert, where his LSD-influenced girlfriend is obsessed with the titular "girl with curious hair".
- "Lyndon". A fictional account of a young man named David Boyd working closely with American president Lyndon B. Johnson and getting entangled personally.
- "John Billy". A narrator with an exaggerated Southern dialect recounts the tale of his town's favorite son, Chuck Nunn Junior, and the consequences of his quest for revenge. The story explores local mythology.
- "Here and There". A boy and girl relate the story of their relationship simultaneously.
- "My Appearance". An actress appears on Late Night with David Letterman while her television producer husband obsessively coaches her. According to Boswell, it is the "most important and successful story" in the collection. First published in Playboy magazine as "Late Night".
- "Say Never". A study of a circle of Chicago Jews centering on one man's declaration of his adultery.
- "Everything Is Green". The shortest story continues the collection's "exploration of interiority/exteriority".
- "Westward the Course of Empire Takes Its Way". According to Boswell, this 150-page novella is "taken on its own ... an engaging piece of pretentious juvenilia; read as a precursor to Infinite Jest, it stands as a fascinating programmatic declaration of intent."

== Sources ==
- Boswell, Marshall (2003). Understanding David Foster Wallace. Understanding contemporary American literature. Univ of South Carolina Press. ISBN 9781570035173.
