= Signifying Rappers =

1990 book by Mark Costello and David Foster Wallace

Signifying Rappers: Rap and Race in the Urban Present
- First edition cover
- Author: Mark Costello; David Foster Wallace
- Language: English
- Publisher: Ecco Press
- Publication date: November 1990
- Publication place: United States
- Pages: 140
- ISBN: 978-0-88001-255-3

Signifying Rappers: Rap and Race in the Urban Present is a nonfiction book by Mark Costello and David Foster Wallace. The book explores the music genre's history as it intersected with historical events, either locally and unique to Boston, or in larger cultural or historical contexts.

== Title ==
The title is based on the track "Signifying Rapper" on the album Smoke Some Kill by Schoolly D. The teasing, taunting, and insulting tradition within African American culture is referred to as "signifyin'", though the word's other meanings are perhaps reflected in Costello and Wallace's title. Henry Louis Gates Jr. has written extensively on the Signifyin (or Signifying) Monkey, its origins and meaning, and how the monkey's attitude and effort to overcome evolved into the "Your motha is so fat" back-and-forth that was part of hip hop's original culture. The slang of rap, like all slang, may include words that signify others, such as "cut" (turntable technique), "bite" (stealing someone else’s rhymes), "dope" (great), "dawg" (male friend) and such neologisms as "edutainment" (KRS-One) or "raptivist" (Chuck D of Public Enemy), but it is not an important use of the idea of signifying in rap or hip hop. Signifying in critical theory usage is also meaningful, as signifier in critical theory, and in the linguistic theory of Ferdinand de Saussure.

== Publication history ==
The work was initially published as a shorter 20-page essay in (Wallace & Costello 1990) and then expanded to book size. The first edition published in late 1990. A second edition was published in 2013, following the death of the first author Wallace, and includes a new preface by second author Mark Costello.

- 1990, Ecco Press, 140 pp, ISBN 0-88001-255-2.
- 2013, Back Bay Books, 176 pp, ISBN 978-0-316-22583-0.
