= This Is Water =

Essay by David Foster Wallace

- First edition hardcover
- Author: David Foster Wallace
- Cover artist: Mario J. Pulice
- Language: English
- Genre: Non-fiction
- Publisher: Little, Brown and Company
- Publication date: April 14, 2009
- Publication place: U.S.
- Media type: Hardback
- Pages: 137
- ISBN: 978-0-316-06822-2

This Is Water: Some Thoughts, Delivered on a Significant Occasion, about Living a Compassionate Life is an essay by David Foster Wallace. The text originates from a commencement speech Wallace gave at Kenyon College on May 21, 2005. The essay was published in The Best American Nonrequired Reading 2006 and in 2009 its format was stretched by Little, Brown and Company to fill 138 pages for a book publication. A transcript of the speech circulated online as early as June 2005.

This is the only public speech Wallace ever gave outlining his outlook on life. Time magazine has ranked This Is Water among the best commencement speeches ever delivered.

== Background ==
David Foster Wallace was brought to Kenyon College at the request of an English and philosophy student in 2005. He was the winning nominee out of 10 to 12 others, beating out then-Senator Hillary Clinton, and astronaut turned senator John Glenn. In response to the request, Wallace jokingly said that at 43, he was far too young to give the speech. He also said he was hesitant to accept because of his anxiety when speaking in front of a crowd. Wallace was persuaded to speak after the school's commencement coordinator allayed his anxiety by stressing the school's intimacy and promising a game of tennis at his request. Wallace's nervousness continued until the day of the event, and Kenyon professors with whom he had breakfast that morning have said he referred to the commencement exclusively as "the big scary ceremony". Wallace continued to edit the speech until hours before he gave it. According to his biographer D. T. Max, Wallace considered the speech an opportunity to convey the things he cared about without the extra work required of a novel.

== Themes ==
The speech covers subjects including the difficulty of empathy, the importance of being well-adjusted, and the apparent lonesomeness of adult life. It suggests that the overall purpose of higher education is to learn to consciously choose how to perceive others, think about meaning, and act appropriately in everyday life. Wallace argues that the true freedom acquired through education is the ability to be fully conscious and sympathetic.

Authors Robert K. Bolger and Scott Korb have said that Wallace used the speech to outline his own spiritual philosophy and the methods he used to find peace when wrestling with anxiety and depression. Bolger and Korb consider the speech almost theological in nature. The speech's themes were expanded on in Wallace's novel The Pale King, posthumously published in 2011.

== Reception ==
The speech met with universal acclaim, but the posthumously published book This Is Water received mixed reviews. Some critics worried that the physical formatting of the speech tainted its delivery. Zach Baron of The Village Voice wrote that he feared that the essay's now-stretched format provided an almost mantra-like emphasis on areas not intended by Wallace.

Another debate on the published format is over a slight rewrite. In the delivered speech, Wallace concluded an extended metaphor with, "It is not the least bit coincidental that adults who commit suicide with firearms almost always shoot themselves in the head. They shoot the terrible master." Due to Wallace's suicide, the publisher chose to remove the final line, "They shoot the terrible master", which polarized critics. One side believed that changing an author's words is unacceptable if the original meaning is to be preserved. But in defense of the edit, the other side argued that the edit is essential to preserving the original message. Author Tom Bissell wrote, "any mention of self-annihilation in Wallace's work...now has a blast radius that obscures everything around it." Bissell feared the line might distract readers from its core elements and therefore supported its removal.

A nine-minute truncated cinematic video adaptation of Wallace giving the speech was produced by The Glossary and published on YouTube and Vimeo in May 2013. It was well received, but was removed by Glossary on May 21, 2013, due to a copyright claim by Wallace's estate.
