= Brief Interviews with Hideous Men =

Short story collection by David Foster Wallace

- First Edition hardcover
- Author: David Foster Wallace
- Cover artist: John Fulbrook III
- Language: English
- Genre: Short story
- Publisher: Little, Brown and Company
- Publication date: May 28, 1999
- Publication place: United States
- Media type: Print (hardback & paperback)
- Pages: 288 pp
- ISBN: 0-316-92541-1
- OCLC: 40354776
- Dewey Decimal: 813/.54 21
- LC Class: PS3573.A425635 B65 1999

Brief Interviews with Hideous Men is a short story collection by American writer David Foster Wallace, first published in 1999 by Little, Brown. According to the papers in the David Foster Wallace Archive at the Harry Ransom Center, University of Texas at Austin, the book had an estimated gross sales of 28,000 hardcover copies during the first year of its publication.

== Contents ==
The collection includes the following stories:

- A Radically Condensed History of Postindustrial Life
- Death Is Not the End
- Forever Overhead
- Brief Interviews with Hideous Men
- Yet Another Example of the Porousness of Certain Borders (XI)
- The Depressed Person
- The Devil Is a Busy Man
- Think
- Signifying Nothing
- Brief Interviews with Hideous Men
- Datum Centurio
- Octet
- Adult World (I)
- Adult World (II)
- The Devil Is a Busy Man
- Church Not Made with Hands
- Yet Another Example of the Porousness of Certain Borders (VI)
- Brief Interviews with Hideous Men
- Tri-Stan: I Sold Sissee Nar to Ecko
- On His Deathbed, Holding Your Hand, the Acclaimed New Young Off-Broadway Playwright's Father Begs a Boon
- Suicide as a Sort of Present
- Brief Interviews with Hideous Men
- Yet Another Example of the Porousness of Certain Borders (XXIV)

== Themes and analysis ==
The 23 metafictional pieces in the collection are "difficult to categorise, roaming wilfully across the boundaries of genres and inventing new ones", which one story ("Octet") appears to "self-mockingly acknowledge".

Four of the stories are titled "Brief Interviews with Hideous Men" and consist of numbered sections of varying length presented as transcripts of interviews with male subjects. The interviewer's questions are omitted from the transcripts, rendered merely as "Q". The collection is characterized by dark humor, alienation and irony.

As its title suggests, the book critiques aspects of modern masculinity and male chauvinism. "The 'hideous men' in Wallace's short stories are monstrous, parodic versions of Updikean characters, scrutinized with the eye of a pathologist ... Their sin is an implacable, and peculiarly American, strain of egoism."

In light of revelations regarding Wallace's abusive behavior toward Mary Karr, some scholars have questioned the motives of Wallace's stories, particularly in the collection which prominently featured misogynistic male characters. Amy Hungerford, a professor of English at Yale University, most notably in her book Making Literature Now, posed the same question for the collection and whether we can separate the art from the artist. She concluded in the negative and argued that readers and academics should stop reading and teaching Wallace's work.

Clare Hayes-Brady, a leading female Wallace scholar, responded to Hungerford's assertion in an interview with the Los Angeles Review of Books by emphasizing that it is the duty of a critic or scholar to engage with problematic authors and examine them closely for what they bring to the table rather than dismissing them outright.

In recent times, Wallace's work, and this collection in particular, has attracted the attention of scholars and academics, with some arguing that Brief Interviews with Hideous Men can be a source of study for possible explanation on the misogynistic traits and behavior of the male gender.

== Critical reception ==
The collection was selected by The New York Times as one of the notable books of the year 1999.

In 1997 Wallace was awarded the Aga Khan Prize for Fiction by the editors of The Paris Review for "Brief Interviews with Hideous Men #6", which had appeared in the magazine and appears as "Brief Interviews with Hideous Men #20" in the collection.

The collection is one of writer Zadie Smith’s favorite books. She wrote an appreciation of both the collection and Wallace titled "Brief Interviews with Hideous Men: The Difficult Gifts of David Foster Wallace". The piece was included in her 2009 essay collection Changing My Mind: Occasional Essays.

The British writer and literary critic for The Guardian, Chris Power, highlights the dilemma book critics face in reviewing Wallace's works: to reconcile the brilliance of his writing with the difficult and often problematic aspects of his subject matter. In a piece on Wallace's contribution to the short story, Power writes, "His second collection, for example, Brief Interviews With Hideous Men (1999), is a brilliant book that is very difficult to enjoy."

Writer and book critic Andrew Ervin writing in the San Francisco Chronicle was of the opinion that the collection "stands as Wallace's most compelling, brilliant and complete book."

== Performances and adaptations ==
The book has been adapted numerous times for stage and screen.

In August 2000, 12 of the "Interviews" were adapted into a stage play (Hideous Men) by Dylan McCullough, marking the first theatrical adaptation of any of Wallace's works. McCullough directed the premiere at the New York International Fringe Festival.

John Krasinski adapted and directed a 2009 film version of the "Brief Interviews" stories. Julianne Nicholson plays Sara Quinn, the interviewer unnamed in the stories.

Also in 2009, Hachette Audio released an abridged audiobook production of the book read by an ensemble cast similar to that of Krasinski's film, including Krasinski, Will Arnett, Bobby Cannavale, Chris Messina, Corey Stoll, Will Forte, and the author.

In August 2012, British artists Andy Holden and David Raymond Conroy presented a stage adaptation of the book at the ICA, London, which later toured to Arnolfini, Bristol. The production adapted four of the interviews and one short story using a variety of multimedia techniques, and contained new music by the Grubby Mitts.

A stage production adapting 21 of the interviews and stories, titled "Brief Interviews with Hideous Men", was directed by David McGuff for Yellow Lab Productions. The production ran three nights, August 28–30, 2014, at the Hill Country Arts Foundation's Point Theater on the Elizabeth Huth Coates indoor stage.

In 2021, the book was adapted for the stage in a German-language production titled Kurze Interviews mit fiesen Männern – 22 Arten der Einsamkeit. The production was staged at the Schauspielhaus Zürich and directed by Yana Ross.

== Translation ==
The book has been translated into Persian, Italian, Spanish, Polish, Turkish, Portuguese, Czech, Finnish, Greek, German, Georgian, Russian, Dutch, Serbian, French, Croatian, Lithuanian, and Hebrew.
