= A Supposedly Fun Thing I'll Never Do Again =

Book by David Foster Wallace

- First edition hardcover
- Author: David Foster Wallace
- Cover artist: Elizabeth Van Itallie
- Language: English
- Genre: Non-fiction
- Publisher: Little, Brown and Co.
- Publication date: February 1, 1997
- Publication place: United States
- Media type: Print (hardback, paperback)
- Pages: 353 pp
- ISBN: 0-316-91989-6
- OCLC: 35318437

A Supposedly Fun Thing I'll Never Do Again: Essays and Arguments is a 1997 collection of nonfiction writing by David Foster Wallace.

In the title essay, originally published in Harper's as "Shipping Out", Wallace describes the excesses of his one-week trip in the Caribbean aboard the cruise ship MV Zenith, which he rechristens the Nadir. He is uncomfortable with the professional hospitality industry and the "fun" he should be having, and explains how the indulgences of the cruise cause introspection, leading to overwhelming internal despair. Wallace uses footnotes extensively for various asides.

Another essay in the same volume takes up the vulgarities and excesses of the Illinois State Fair. This collection also includes Wallace's influential essay "E Unibus Pluram" on television's impact on contemporary literature and the use of irony in American culture. In 2019, the collection was ranked in Slate as one of the 50 greatest nonfiction works of the past 25 years.

== Essays ==
Essays collected in the book:

- "Derivative Sport in Tornado Alley" (Harper's, December 1991, under the title "Tennis, Trigonometry, Tornadoes"): An autobiographical essay about Wallace's youth in the Midwest, his involvement in competitive tennis, and his interest in mathematics.
- "E Unibus Pluram: Television and U.S. Fiction" (The Review of Contemporary Fiction, 1993)
- "Getting Away from Already Being Pretty Much Away from It All" (Harper's, 1994, under the title "Ticket to the Fair"): Wallace's experiences and opinions on the 1993 Illinois State Fair, ranging from a report on competitive baton twirling to speculation on how the Illinois State Fair is representative of Midwestern culture and its subsets.
- "Greatly Exaggerated" (Harvard Book Review, 1991): A review of Morte d'Author: An Autopsy by H. L. Hix, including Wallace's personal opinions on the role of the author in literary critical theory.
- "David Lynch Keeps His Head" (Première, 1996): Wallace's experiences and opinions from visiting the set for Lost Highway and his thoughts about Lynch's oeuvre.
- "Tennis Player Michael Joyce's Professional Artistry as a Paradigm of Certain Stuff about Choice, Freedom, Discipline, Joy, Grotesquerie, and Human Completeness" (Esquire, 1996, under the title "The String Theory"): Wallace's reporting of the qualifying rounds for 1995 Canadian Open and the Open itself, with the author's thoughts on the nature of tennis and professional athletics.
- "A Supposedly Fun Thing I'll Never Do Again" (Harper's, 1996, under the title "Shipping Out"): Wallace's experiences and opinions on a seven-night luxury Caribbean cruise.

== In popular culture ==
In his 2011 book That Is All, John Hodgman titles a chapter about taking a cruise "A Totally Fun Thing I Would Do Again as Soon as Possible". The title of the 2012 Simpsons episode "A Totally Fun Thing That Bart Will Never Do Again" also references the title essay. Tina Fey's 2011 memoir Bossypants includes a chapter on her own cruise experience, titled "My Honeymoon: Or, A Supposedly Fun Thing That I'll Never Do Again Either", in which she jokingly suggests that those who've heard of Wallace's book should consider themselves members of the "cultural elite". In Charlie Kaufman's 2020 film I'm Thinking of Ending Things, the character Jake mentions the book, refers to "E Unibus Pluram", then recites a portion of the essay from the section "Image-Fiction" verbatim.
