= David Foster Wallace =

American writer (1962–2008)

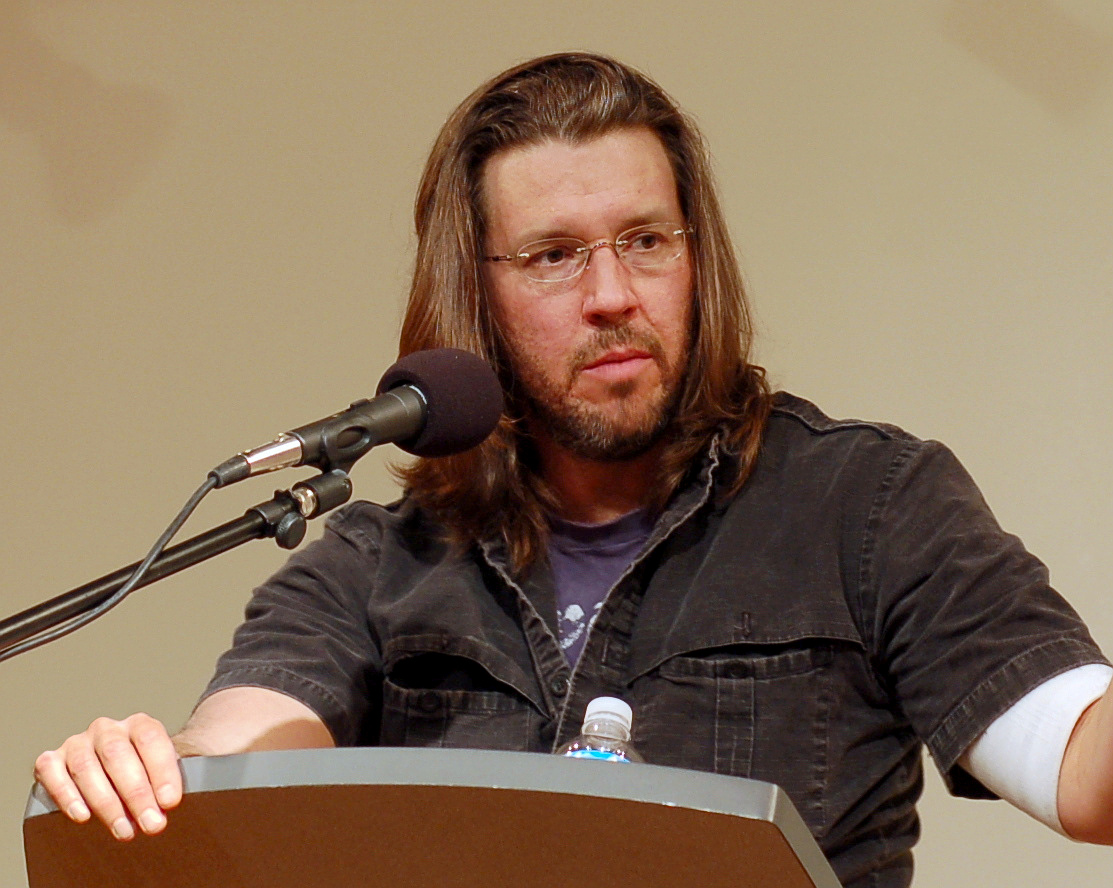
- Wallace in 2006
- Born: February 21, 1962; Ithaca, New York, U.S.
- Died: September 12, 2008 (aged 46); Claremont, California, U.S.
- Education: Amherst College (BA); University of Arizona (MFA)
- Occupations: writer; professor
- Spouse: Karen Green (m. 2004)
- Relatives: James D. Wallace (father)
- Writing career
- Period: 1987–2008
- Genres: Literary fiction; non-fiction
- Notable work: Infinite Jest (1996)
- Movements: Postmodern literature; post-postmodernism; Metamodernism; neorealism; New Sincerity

Signature
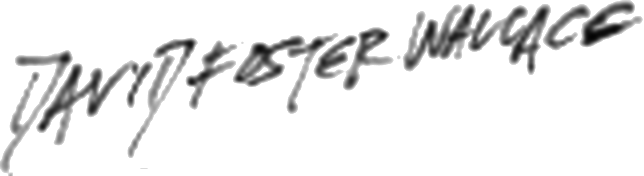

David Foster Wallace (February 21, 1962 – September 12, 2008) was an American writer and professor who published novels, short stories, and essays. He is best known for his second novel, Infinite Jest (1996). In 2008, David Ulin wrote in the Los Angeles Times that Wallace was "one of the most influential and innovative writers of the last twenty years".

Wallace grew up in Illinois, and graduated from Amherst College and the University of Arizona. His Amherst honors thesis on philosophy and modal logic was adapted into his debut novel The Broom of the System (1987). Wallace taught English and creative writing at Illinois State University, Emerson College, and Pomona College.

As a writer of "post-postmodern" literature, Wallace intentionally avoided many tropes of postmodern art, including forms of irony and metafiction, asserting in 1990 that such tropes were "agents of a great despair and stasis" in contemporary American culture. He often wrote about tennis, which he played as a teenager; Infinite Jest is partly set in a tennis academy. The novel is known for its length; unconventional narrative structure, involving numerous endnotes; and exemplification of the encyclopedic novel and hysterical realist literary style.

Wallace's short stories and essays were published in The New Yorker, Rolling Stone, and other outlets. His short stories were collected in three books: Girl with Curious Hair (1989), Brief Interviews with Hideous Men (1999), and Oblivion: Stories (2004). His essays are collected in A Supposedly Fun Thing I'll Never Do Again (1997), Consider the Lobster (2005), and Both Flesh and Not (2012). He wrote two nonfiction books: Signifying Rappers (1990), on cross-cultural communication in hip-hop (co-authored with Mark Costello), and Everything and More (2003), on the history of infinity in set theory.

In 2008, after struggling with depression for decades, Wallace died by suicide. His unfinished novel The Pale King was published in 2011 and was a finalist for the 2012 Pulitzer Prize for Fiction.

== Early life and education ==
David Foster Wallace was born in Ithaca, New York, to Sally Jean Wallace (née Foster) and James D. Wallace. The family moved to Champaign–Urbana, Illinois, where he and his younger sister, Amy, were raised. His father was a philosophy professor at the University of Illinois Urbana-Champaign. His mother was an English professor at Parkland College, a community college in Champaign, which recognized her work with a "Professor of the Year" award in 1996. From fourth grade, Wallace lived with his family in Urbana, where he attended Yankee Ridge Elementary School, Brookens Junior High School, and Urbana High School.

As an adolescent, Wallace was a regionally ranked junior tennis player. He wrote about this period in the essay "Derivative Sport in Tornado Alley", originally published in Harper's Magazine as "Tennis, Trigonometry, Tornadoes". Although his parents were atheists, Wallace twice attempted to join the Catholic Church, but "flunk[ed] the period of inquiry". He later attended a Mennonite church.

Wallace attended Amherst College, his father's alma mater, where he majored in English and philosophy and graduated summa cum laude in 1985. Among other extracurricular activities, he participated in glee club; his sister recalls that he "had a lovely singing voice". In studying philosophy, Wallace pursued modal logic and mathematics, and presented in 1985 a senior thesis in philosophy and modal logic that was awarded the Gail Kennedy Memorial Prize and posthumously published as Fate, Time, and Language: An Essay on Free Will (2010).

Wallace adapted his honors thesis in English as the manuscript of his first novel, The Broom of the System (1987), and committed to being a writer. He told David Lipsky: "Writing The Broom of the System, I felt like I was using 97 percent of me, whereas philosophy was using 50 percent." Wallace completed a Master of Fine Arts degree in creative writing at the University of Arizona in 1987. He moved back to Massachusetts to attend graduate school in philosophy at Harvard University in fall 1989, but soon left the program.

== Career ==
Wallace published short fiction in periodicals including The New Yorker, GQ, Harper's Magazine, Playboy, The Paris Review, Mid-American Review, Conjunctions, Esquire, Open City, Puerto del Sol, and Timothy McSweeney's Quarterly Concern.

Bonnie Nadell was Wallace's literary agent for his entire career.

In 1991, Wallace began teaching literature as an adjunct professor at Emerson College in Boston. The next year, at the suggestion of colleague and supporter Steven Moore, Wallace was hired by the English department at Illinois State University.

In 1997, Wallace received a MacArthur Fellowship. He also received the Aga Khan Prize for Fiction, awarded by editors of The Paris Review, for one of the stories in Brief Interviews with Hideous Men, which had been published in the magazine.

In 2002, Wallace became the first Roy E. Disney-endowed Professor of Creative Writing and Professor of English at Pomona College in Claremont, California. He taught one or two undergraduate courses per semester and focused on writing.

=== Themes and styles ===
Wallace wanted to progress beyond the irony and metafiction associated with postmodernism and explore a post-postmodern or metamodern style. In the essay "E Unibus Pluram: Television and U.S. Fiction" (written 1990, published 1993), he proposed that television has an ironic influence on fiction, and urged literary authors to eschew TV's shallow rebelliousness:

I want to convince you that irony, poker-faced silence, and fear of ridicule are distinctive of those features of contemporary U.S. culture (of which cutting-edge fiction is a part) that enjoy any significant relation to the television whose weird, pretty hand has my generation by the throat. I'm going to argue that irony and ridicule are entertaining and effective, and that, at the same time, they are agents of a great despair and stasis in U.S. culture, and that, for aspiring fictionists, they pose terrifically vexing problems.

Wallace used many forms of irony, but tended to focus on individual persons' continued longing for earnest, unself-conscious experience and communication in a media-saturated society.

Wallace's fiction combines narrative modes and authorial voices that incorporate jargon and invented vocabulary, such as self-generated abbreviations and acronyms, long, multi-clause sentences, and an extensive use of explanatory endnotes and footnotes, as in Infinite Jest and the story "Octet" (collected in Brief Interviews with Hideous Men), and most of his non-fiction after 1996. In a 1997 interview on Charlie Rose, Wallace said that the notes were to disrupt the linear narrative, to reflect his perception of reality without jumbling the narrative structure, and that he could have jumbled the sentences "but then no one would read it". Much of Wallace's writing contains philosophical and mathematical ideas and references.

D. T. Max has described Wallace's work as an "unusual mixture of the cerebral and the hot-blooded", often featuring multiple protagonists and spanning different locations in a single work. His writing comments on the fragmentation of thought, the relationship between happiness and boredom, and the psychological tension between the beauty and hideousness of the human body. According to Wallace, "fiction's about what it is to be a fucking human being", and he said he wanted to write "morally passionate, passionately moral fiction" that could help the reader "become less alone inside". In his Kenyon College commencement address (later published as This Is Water), Wallace described the human condition as daily crises and chronic disillusionment and warned against succumbing to solipsism, invoking the existential values of compassion and mindfulness:

The really important kind of freedom involves attention, and awareness, and discipline, and effort, and being able truly to care about other people and to sacrifice for them, over and over, in myriad petty little unsexy ways, every day. ... The only thing that's capital-T True is that you get to decide how you're going to try to see it. You get to consciously decide what has meaning and what doesn't. ... The trick is keeping the truth up-front in daily consciousness.

=== The Broom of the System (1987) ===
The Broom of the System (1987) received national attention and critical praise. In The New York Times, Caryn James called it a "manic, human, flawed extravaganza ... emerging straight from the excessive tradition of Stanley Elkin's The Franchiser, Thomas Pynchon's V., [and] John Irving's World According to Garp".

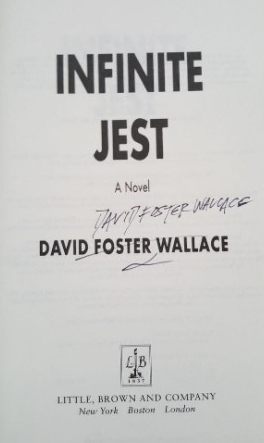
Title page of a 1996 edition copy of Infinite Jest, with Wallace's autograph

=== Infinite Jest (1996) ===
Wallace began his second novel, Infinite Jest, in 1991, and submitted a draft to his editor in December 1993. He worked on the book while living in Syracuse, New York, for about a year. After the publication of excerpts throughout 1995, the book was published by Little, Brown & Company in 1996.

Michael Pietsch was the book's editor.

==== Setting and premise ====
Infinite Jest is set in North America in the near future. The former United States, Mexico, and Canada have formed the Organization of North American Nations (ONAN). Québécois militants are striving for secession. Much of northern New England has been allocated to house the "Great Concavity" or "Great Convexity", a landfill that holds nuclear waste. The Gregorian calendar has been replaced by "subsidized time", wherein years are sponsored by corporations and have names such as "Year of the Perdue Wonderchicken". Most of the novel is set in the Year of the Depend Adult Undergarment (YDAU).

The novel focuses on two residents of Enfield, Massachusetts: Hal Incandenza, a tennis prodigy with a debilitating communication disorder, and Don Gately, a former burglar working at a halfway house for drug and alcohol addicts. Characters also search for "the Entertainment": a videotape directed by Hal's father, avant-garde filmmaker James O. Incandenza, which is so entertaining that its viewers compulsively rewatch it until they die.

==== Reception ====
Infinite Jest was "very intensely hyped" in the years before its release, partially owing to heavy marketing by Little, Brown & Company. Initial reviews were mixed. For The New York Times, Jay McInerney wrote that it was "alternately tedious and effulgent", with "many uninteresting pages" but "not many uninteresting sentences", and noted "Wallace's talent" and "erudition". Piotr Siemion of Electronic Book Review wrote that the book might be "artful or awkward" but "is much better than pretty much anything else that got written in the way of [the] American Novel" in recent years. In The Atlantic, Sven Birkerts called it "confusing [and] maddening" but "also resourceful, hilarious, intelligent, and unique". Popular reception was highly favorable. Hermione Hoby later wrote for Literary Hub that "it was more than a best-seller [...] a phenomenon, a widespread, must-read accessory and experience."

=== The Pale King (2011, posthumous) ===
Wallace died in 2008. In March 2009, Little, Brown and Company announced that it would publish the manuscript of a novel, The Pale King, that Wallace had left unfinished. Pietsch pieced the novel together from pages and notes Wallace left behind. Several excerpts were published in The New Yorker and other magazines.

The Pale King was published on April 15, 2011, and received generally positive reviews. Michiko Kakutani of The New York Times wrote that it "showcases [Wallace's] embrace of discontinuity; his fascination with both the meta and the microscopic, postmodern pyrotechnics and old-fashioned storytelling; and his ongoing interest in contemporary America's obsession with self-gratification and entertainment." The book was a finalist for the 2012 Pulitzer Prize for Fiction, which was not awarded.

=== Nonfiction works ===
Wallace covered Senator John McCain's 2000 presidential campaign and the September 11 attacks for Rolling Stone; cruise ships (in what became the title essay of his first nonfiction book), state fairs, and tornadoes for Harper's Magazine; the US Open for Tennis magazine; tennis player Roger Federer for The New York Times; conservative talk radio host John Ziegler for The Atlantic; film director David Lynch and the pornography industry for Première magazine; tennis player Michael Joyce for Esquire; and the film special-effects industry for Waterstones' magazine. In the November 2007 issue of The Atlantic, which commemorated the magazine's 150th anniversary, Wallace was among authors, artists, politicians, and others who wrote a short piece on "the future of the American idea".

A lobster being boiled in a pot during food preparation

In his essay "Consider the Lobster", published in Gourmet magazine in August 2004, Wallace wrote about his visit to the 56th Annual Maine Lobster Festival, held from July 30 to August 3, 2003, in the context of the festival's and food industry's practice of seafood boils involving live lobsters. He appealed to Gourmet's readers, especially those who had performed such boils, to imagine "the way a lobster feels after being plunged into a pot of boiling water" and wrote that the practice was emblematic of "pure late-date American" cultural customs that are "alien, ignorant, [and] greedy". The essay became famous for being uniquely critical of the food industry for food journalism at the time. Gourmet received numerous complaints from readers. The essay was included in the 2005 edition of the Best American Essays anthology series, edited that year by Susan Orlean.

Wallace's essays are collected in three books, A Supposedly Fun Thing I'll Never Do Again, Consider the Lobster, and the posthumous Both Flesh and Not. The latter contains some of his earliest works, including his first published essay, "Fictional Futures and the Conspicuously Young". Wallace's writing on tennis was compiled into a volume titled String Theory: David Foster Wallace on Tennis, published in 2016.

Some writers have found parts of Wallace's nonfiction implausible. His friend Jonathan Franzen has said that he believes Wallace made up dialogue and incidents: "those things didn't actually happen". Of the essays "Shipping Out" and "Ticket to the Fair", John Cook remarked that in Wallace's nonfiction, he "encounters pitch-perfect characters who speak comedically crystalline lines and place him in hilariously absurd situations", and that Cook "used both stories [when teaching journalism] as examples of the inescapable temptation to shave, embellish, and invent narratives".

Wallace also reviewed books for the Los Angeles Times, The Washington Post, The New York Times, and The Philadelphia Inquirer.

In 2005, Wallace delivered the commencement address at Kenyon College. The speech was published as a book, This Is Water, in 2009. In 2013, parts of the speech were used in a popular online video, also titled "This Is Water".

== Personal life ==
Wallace struggled with depression, alcoholism, drug addiction, and suicidal ideation, and was repeatedly hospitalized for psychiatric care. In 2008, his father said that Wallace had suffered from major depressive disorder for more than 20 years, and that antidepressant medication had allowed him to be productive. In 1989, Wallace spent four weeks at McLean Hospital, a psychiatric institute in Belmont, Massachusetts, affiliated with Harvard Medical School, where he completed a drug and alcohol detoxification program; he later said his time there changed his life.

In the early 1990s, Wallace dated writer Mary Karr. In 2012, Karr described his earlier behavior toward her as obsessive and volatile, alleging that he once threw a coffee table at her and once physically forced her out of a car, leaving her to walk home. In 2018, Karr said that the account of Wallace's alleged abuse in D.T. Max's biography of him was "about 2% of what happened"; she said Wallace had kicked her, climbed up the side of her house at night, followed her five-year-old son home from school, and attempted to buy a gun to kill her ex-husband. In 2015, Karr said that Wallace was violent toward other women he dated, and in 2018, she said that several women, including former students of Wallace, contacted her to share their alleged physical and emotional abuse by Wallace.

Wallace in 2006

In 2002, Wallace met painter Karen L. Green. They married on December 27, 2004. At the time of Wallace's death, they lived in a house in Claremont, California.

Dogs were important to Wallace, and he spoke of opening a shelter for stray canines. According to Jonathan Franzen, Wallace "had a predilection for dogs who'd been abused, and [were] unlikely to find other owners who were going to be patient enough for them".

In June 2007, Wallace suffered a physical illness involving severe stomach pains. His doctors believed it was caused by an interaction of one of his medications with food he had eaten at a restaurant. On his doctor's advice, and out of concern that the drug might be interfering with his writing, Wallace stopped taking phenelzine (Nardil), his primary antidepressant. His depression recurred, and he tried other treatments, including electroconvulsive therapy. He eventually went back on phenelzine. Writer David Lipsky reported it was not working, while D. T. Max later wrote that Wallace's wife, Karen Green, said he had been too agitated to give the drug enough time to work. Wallace remained severely depressed during the final months of his life.

== Death ==
On September 12, 2008, at age 46, Wallace wrote a suicide note to his wife, arranged part of the manuscript for The Pale King, and hanged himself on the back porch of his house. Memorial gatherings were held at Pomona College, Amherst College, the University of Arizona, Illinois State University, and, on October 23, 2008, at New York University (NYU). The eulogists at NYU included his sister, Amy Wallace-Havens; his literary agent, Bonnie Nadell; Gerry Howard, editor of his first two books; Colin Harrison, an editor at Harper's Magazine; Michael Pietsch, editor of Infinite Jest and later works; Deborah Treisman, fiction editor at The New Yorker magazine; and the writers Don DeLillo, Zadie Smith, George Saunders, Mark Costello, Donald Antrim, and Jonathan Franzen.

== Legacy ==
In March 2010, it was announced that Wallace's personal papers and archives—drafts of books, stories, essays, poems, letters, and research, including the handwritten notes for Infinite Jest—had been purchased by the University of Texas at Austin. They are held at that university's Harry Ransom Center.

Since 2011, Loyola University New Orleans has offered English seminar courses on Wallace. Similar courses have also been taught at Harvard University. The first David Foster Wallace Conference was hosted by the Illinois State University Department of English in May 2014; the second was held in May 2015.

In January 2017, the International David Foster Wallace Society and the Journal of David Foster Wallace Studies were launched.

Among the writers who have cited Wallace as an influence are Dave Eggers, Jonathan Franzen, Rivka Galchen, Matthew Gallaway, David Gordon, John Green, Porochista Khakpour, George Saunders, Michael Schur, Zadie Smith, Darin Strauss, Deb Olin Unferth, Elizabeth Wurtzel, and Charles Yu.

=== Adaptations ===
==== Film and television ====
A feature-length film adaptation of Brief Interviews with Hideous Men, directed by John Krasinski with an ensemble cast, was released in 2009 and premiered at the Sundance Film Festival.

The 19th episode of the 23rd season of The Simpsons, "A Totally Fun Thing Bart Will Never Do Again" (2012), is loosely based on Wallace's essay "Shipping Out" from his 1997 collection, A Supposedly Fun Thing I'll Never Do Again. The Simpson family takes a cruise, and Wallace appears in the background of a scene, wearing a tuxedo T-shirt while eating in the ship's dining room.

The 2015 film The End of the Tour is based on conversations David Lipsky had with Wallace, transcribed in Although of Course You End Up Becoming Yourself (2010). Jason Segel played Wallace, and Jesse Eisenberg played Lipsky. The film won an Audience Award for Best Narrative Feature at the Sarasota Film Festival, and Segel was nominated for the Independent Spirit Award for Best Male Lead.

"Partridge", a Season 5 episode of NBC's Parks and Recreation, repeatedly references Infinite Jest, of which the show's co-creator, Michael Schur, is a noted fan. Schur also directed the music video for The Decemberists' "Calamity Song", which depicts the Eschaton game from Infinite Jest.

==== Stage and music adaptations ====
Twelve of the interviews from Brief Interviews with Hideous Men were adapted as a stage play in 2000 by Dylan McCullough. This was the first theatrical adaptation of Wallace's work. The play, Hideous Men, was also directed by McCullough, and premiered at the New York International Fringe Festival in August 2000.

Brief Interviews was also adapted by director Marc Caellas as a play, Brief Interviews with Hideous Writers, which premiered at Fundación Tomás Eloy Martinez in Buenos Aires on November 4, 2011. In 2012 it was adapted as a play by artist Andy Holden for a two-night run at the ICA in London.

The short story "Tri-Stan: I Sold Sissee Nar to Ecko", from Brief Interviews with Hideous Men, was adapted by composer Eric Moe into a 50-minute operatic piece, to be performed with accompanying video projections. The piece was described as having "subversively inscribed classical music into pop culture".

Infinite Jest was performed once as a stage play by Germany's experimental theater Hebbel am Ufer. The play was staged in various locations throughout Berlin, and the action took place over a 24-hour period.

"Good Old Neon", from Oblivion: Stories, was adapted and performed by Ian Forester at the 2011 Hollywood Fringe Festival, produced by the Los Angeles independent theater company Needtheater.

The song "Surrounded by Heads and Bodies", from the 1975's album A Brief Inquiry into Online Relationships, takes its title from the opening line of Infinite Jest. Matty Healy, the 1975's lead singer, said in an interview that he was inspired by the novel after reading it during a stint in rehabilitation:

I was reading it when I was in rehab. There was no one there. It was me and my nurses, who'd come in and check on me, and then Angela [the protagonist of the song], miles away. I was surrounded by no one, and the book was just open on the front page, as most copies of Infinite Jest are ... nobody reads it all the way! Everyone our age has got a battered, quarter-read copy of Infinite Jest.

== Bibliography ==
=== Novels ===
- The Broom of the System (1987). ISBN 9781101153536
- Infinite Jest (1996). ISBN 9780316920049
- The Pale King (2011, posthumous). ISBN 9780316175296

=== Short story collections ===
- Girl with Curious Hair (1989). ISBN 9780393313963
- Brief Interviews with Hideous Men (1999). ISBN 9780316086899
- Oblivion: Stories (2004). ISBN 9780759511569

=== Nonfiction collections ===
- A Supposedly Fun Thing I'll Never Do Again (1997). ISBN 9780316090520
- Consider the Lobster (2005). ISBN 9780349119519
- Both Flesh and Not (2012, posthumous). ISBN 9780316214698

=== Other books ===
- Signifying Rappers: Rap and Race in the Urban Present (1990; with Mark Costello; second edition 2013).
- Everything and More: A Compact History of Infinity (2003).
- Fate, Time, and Language: An Essay on Free Will (2010). Columbia University Press [reprint of 1985 thesis]. ISBN 978-0231151573.
- The David Foster Wallace Reader (2014, posthumous). ISBN 9780316182393 A collection of previously collected stories, essays, and excerpts from Wallace's novels and teaching notes.
- Something to Do with Paying Attention (2022, posthumous). ISBN 9781946022271 A novella excerpted from The Pale King.

== Awards and honors ==
- Pulitzer Prize finalist for The Pale King, 2012. No prize was awarded for the fiction category that year
- Inclusion of "Good Old Neon" in The O. Henry Prize Stories 2002
- John D. and Catherine T. MacArthur Foundation Fellowship, 1997–2002
- Lannan Foundation Residency Fellow, July–August 2000
- Named to Usage Panel, The American Heritage Dictionary of the English Language 4th Ed. et seq., 1999
- Inclusion of "The Depressed Person" in Prize Stories 1999: The O. Henry Awards
- Illinois State University, Outstanding University Researcher, 1998 and 1999
- Aga Khan Prize for Fiction for the story "Brief Interviews with Hideous Men #6", 1997
- Time magazine's Best Books of the Year (Fiction), 1996
- Salon Book Award (Fiction), 1996
- Lannan Literary Award (Fiction), 1996
- Inclusion of "Here and There" in Prize Stories 1989: The O. Henry Awards
- Whiting Award, 1987

== See also ==
- Hysterical realism
- Postmodern literature
- Inverse cost and quality law

== Sources ==
- Boswell, Marshall; Burn, Stephen, eds. (2013). A Companion to David Foster Wallace Studies. American Literature Readings in the Twenty-First Century. New York: Palgrave Macmillan. ISBN 9781137078346. OCLC 832399604.
