= Three Thousand Dollars =

1989 short story collection by David Lipsky

- Author: David Lipsky
- Language: English
- Publisher: Simon & Schuster
- Publication date: September 1, 1989
- Publication place: United States
- Media type: Print (hardback & paperback)
- Pages: 240 pp (first edition, hc)
- ISBN: 9780671673468 (first)
- OCLC: 19814712
- Dewey Decimal: 813/.54 20
- LC Class: PS3562.I627 T47 1989
- Followed by: The Art Fair

Three Thousand Dollars is a 1989 short story collection by American author David Lipsky. It revolves around the New York City Art world, university life, and issues of growing up. Individual chapters were published in The New Yorker, Mississippi Review, The Henfeild Prize Stories, and The Best American Short Stories, among others.

== Story ==
Three Thousand Dollars marks the first appearances by Joan and Richard Freely, main characters in Lipsky's novel The Art Fair. Critics found resemblances to Lipsky's own mother, the abstract-expressionist painter Pat Lipsky. The Los Angeles Times noted that Lipsky's collection provided "astonishing insights into the machinations of the New York city art world." The Wall Street Journal called Lipsky's portrait of the art world "treacherous, sly and amusing."

Lipsky wrote the collection when he was 22 and a student in the MFA program at Johns Hopkins University. Novelist John Gregory Brown explained, "It was kind of apparent that Lipsky might have the brightest future of anyone [here]."

== Reception ==
The book was well-received upon publication. Lipsky was seen to possess "unlimited depth and range of vision," with the San Francisco Chronicle calling the work "an irresistible debut." Stories were compared to the works of F. Scott Fitzgerald. Yearly round-up Magill's Literary Annual called the book "a vivid artistic rendition of the experience of growing up, a series of brilliant reflections and poignant insights," adding, "Lipsky’s subtle, fine humor and his irreverently inquiring voice always succeed." The Providence Journal addressed Lipsky's "near-perfect pitch for dialogue." The Los Angeles Times, while noting the book's "astonishing insights" into the art world concluded, "Lipsky has given his contemporaries a general autobiography, one that will fit the majority with only minor adjustments." The trade publication Booklist summarized, "Critics loved Lipsky's short story collection."

== See also ==
- The End of the Tour
- Pat Lipsky
- The Art Fair

== Honors ==
- Henfield Prize Stories 1992
- Best American Short Stories of 1986
