= The Art Fair =

1996 novel by David Lipsky

- Author: David Lipsky
- Language: English
- Publisher: Doubleday
- Publication date: June 1, 1996
- Publication place: United States
- Media type: Print (hardback & paperback)
- Pages: 270 pp (first edition, hc)
- ISBN: 0-385-426100 (first)
- OCLC: 33244171
- Dewey Decimal: 813/.54 21
- LC Class: PS3562.I627 A89 1996
- Preceded by: Three Thousand Dollars
- Followed by: Absolutely American

The Art Fair is a 1996 novel by American author David Lipsky. It revolves around the New York City Art world, and a painter and her son making their way through that world.

== Story ==
The Art Fair tells the story of Richard and Joan Freely—a New York artist and her precocious son. Considered to be autobiographical by some critics, the novel narrates stories of "painters, critics and gallery dealers." The book's genesis is Lipsky's collection of stories Three Thousand Dollars, which The Los Angeles Times wrote contains "astonishing insights into the machinations of the New York art world."

== Reception ==
The novel was warmly received by critics. The New York Times called the book "riveting," The New Yorker described it "a darkly comic love story," People noted, "Lipsky's portrayal of the art world is unblinking, his portrayal of the ties between parent and child deeply affecting"; the critic Francine Prose in Newsday called the book's "Darwinian" milieu a "testament to Lipsky's skill" and critic James Atlas wrote "the novel perfectly captures artists and dealers, the tiny gestures of cruelty that confirm or withhold status." In Newsweek, writer David Gates called it, "A knowing art scene roman a clef, a wry comedy of manners, a delicately handled mother-son love story", and The Los Angeles Times wrote the novel "expertly explores the deep, inexplicable bond between mother and son. It also is rich in the luminous joys and dark pains that color every family." The trade publication Library Journal summarized, "The praise has poured as thick as impasto."

== See also ==
- The End of the Tour
- Pat Lipsky
