= James Ponsoldt =

American film director, actor and screenwriter

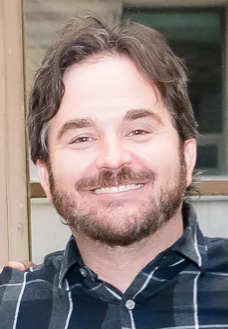
- Ponsoldt at the Toronto International Film Festival premiere of Sorry for Your Loss
- Born: James Adam Ponsoldt; September 5, 1978 (age 48); Athens, Georgia, U.S.
- Education: Yale University (BA); Columbia University (MFA); University of California, Los Angeles (GrDip)
- Occupations: Film director, screenwriter, actor
- Spouse: Megan Lane Hollaway (m. 2010)
- Children: 3

James Adam Ponsoldt (September 5, 1978), known as James Ponsoldt is an American film director, actor and screenwriter. He directed the drama films Off the Black (2006) and Smashed (2012), the romantic comedy-drama The Spectacular Now (2013), and the dramas The End of the Tour (2015) and The Circle (2017).

== Early life ==
Ponsoldt was born in Athens, Georgia. He is the son of James F. and Susan E. Ponsoldt, and the grandson of graphic artist William Teason. His father is a retired law professor, formerly at the University of Georgia. He grew up in Athens and attended Cedar Shoals High School. He received his bachelor's degree from Yale University and graduated from Columbia University with an MFA in directing. Ponsoldt is also a graduate of the Professional Programs in Screenwriting and Producing at the UCLA School of Theater, Film and Television.

== Career ==
=== Short films ===
Ponsoldt has written and directed three short films: Coming Down the Mountain (2003), Rush Tickets (2003), and Junebug and Hurricane (2004). He also co-directed (and served as a co-directory of photography and an editor on) a documentary short called We Saw Such Things (2008), about the mermaids of Weeki Wachee Springs, Florida.

=== Feature films ===
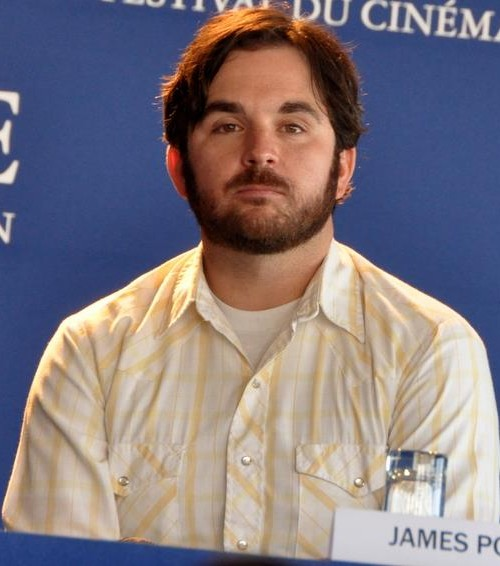
Ponsoldt in 2012

==== Off the Black ====
Ponsoldt's first feature film that he both wrote and directed, Off the Black (2006), premiered at the Sundance Film Festival in 2006. The film stars Nick Nolte and Trevor Morgan.

==== Smashed ====
Ponsoldt's second feature film that he also both wrote and directed was Smashed (2012), which starred Mary Elizabeth Winstead and Aaron Paul. Smashed premiered at the 2012 Sundance Film Festival on January 22, 2012, and won the U.S. Dramatic Special Jury Prize for Excellence in Independent Film Producing. The film also received an Independent Spirit Award nomination for Winstead's performance.

==== The Spectacular Now ====
The Spectacular Now (2013), the third feature film Ponsoldt directed, was written by Scott Neustadter and Michael H. Weber, based on the novel by Tim Tharp. The film premiered at the 2013 Sundance Film Festival, where it was warmly received and was given the Special Jury Award for Acting for the performances from its two leads, Miles Teller and Shailene Woodley. New York-based distribution company A24 inked a deal for The Spectacular Now, which Ponsoldt shot in Athens, Georgia, in the summer of 2012. The film was released on August 2, 2013.

In The Hollywood Reporter, critic Todd McCarthy called the movie "a sincere, refreshingly unaffected look at teenagers and their attitudes about the future...Ordinary in some ways and extraordinary in others, The Spectacular Now benefits from an exceptional feel for its main characters on the parts of the director and lead actors." Cinema Blend called it "the rare Sundance coming-of-age story that feels like it matters," adding: "The Spectacular Now is an instant MVP of the first half of the festival, with potential breakout hit written all over it...you'll be hearing a lot about this one down the road, and it's got the goods to live up to the hype." Spin called the film "The next great teen movie." In Variety, critic Rob Nelson wrote: "The scars and blemishes on the faces of the high-school lovers in The Spectacular Now are beautifully emblematic of director James Ponsoldt's bid to bring the American teen movie back to some semblance of reality, a bid that pays off spectacularly indeed."

==== The End of the Tour ====
Ponsoldt's fourth feature as director is The End of the Tour (2015), with a screenplay by Donald Margulies, based on the book Although of Course You End Up Becoming Yourself (2010) by David Lipsky. It follows Rolling Stone writer David Lipsky (Jesse Eisenberg) as he interviews author David Foster Wallace (Jason Segel) during the final week of the promotional book tour for Infinite Jest. The film also stars Anna Chlumsky and Ron Livingston. It premiered at The Sundance Film Festival in January 2015 and was released theatrically in July 2015.

==== The Circle ====
Ponsoldt's fifth feature film is an adaptation of Dave Eggers's novel The Circle, about an omnipotent high-tech company known as "The Circle". Emma Watson, Tom Hanks, Karen Gillan, and John Boyega star in the film, which was released on April 28, 2017. Ponsoldt co-produced the film.

==== Summering ====
In August 2021, Bleecker Street and Stage 6 Films picked up the worldwide rights to Ponsoldt's coming-of-age film Summering, starring Sarah Cooper and Megan Mullally.

=== Television ===
Ponsoldt has directed an episode of Parenthood titled "The M Word" (2013), an episode of Shameless titled "Iron City" (2014), and two episodes (including the pilot) of the Aziz Ansari series Master of None. He also directed and executive produced four episodes of the first season of the Facebook Watch original Sorry for Your Loss, including the pilot and the season finale. Ponsoldt executive produced and directed multiple episodes of the Amazon miniseries Daisy Jones & the Six and the Apple comedy series Shrinking.

=== Future projects ===
It was announced in May 2015 that Ponsoldt was in negotiations to write and direct an adaptation of the Stewart O'Nan novel West of Sunset, which follows writer F. Scott Fitzgerald as he comes to Hollywood to try his hand at screenwriting in 1937, when his health was poor, his finances were dismal, and his wife was in an insane asylum.

=== Producing ===
In addition to producing or serving as an executive producer on films he both wrote and directed, Ponsoldt was an associate producer on the TV movie Porn 'n Chicken (2002), was an executive producer on the feature film Amira & Sam (2014), directed and written by Sean Mullin, and was an executive producer on the short film Mountain Low (2014), written and directed by Andy Bruntel.

== Filmography ==
=== Feature films ===
Year	Title	Director	Writer	Producer
2006	Off the Black	Yes	Yes	No
2012	Smashed	Yes	Yes	No
2013	The Spectacular Now	Yes	No	No
2015	The End of the Tour	Yes	No	No
2017	The Circle	Yes	Yes	Yes
2022	Summering	Yes	Yes	Yes
TBA	Sponsor †	Yes	Yes	Yes

=== Short films ===
Year	Title	Director	Writer	Producer	Notes
2003	Coming Down the Mountain	Yes	Yes	No	
2003	Rush Tickets	Yes	Yes	Yes	
2004	Junebug and Hurricane	Yes	Yes	Yes	
2008	We Saw Such Things	Yes	Yes	Yes	Documentary short; Also editor and cinematographer

=== Television ===
Year	Title	Director	Executive producer	Note
2013	Parenthood	Yes	No	Episode: "The M Word"
2014	Shameless	Yes	No	Episode: "Iron City"
2015	Master of None	Yes	No	Episodes: "Plan B" and "Hot Ticket"
2018–2019	Sorry for Your Loss	Yes	Yes	6 episodes
2023–present	Shrinking	Yes	Yes	11 episodes
2023	Daisy Jones & the Six	Yes	Yes	5 episodes
2025	Running Point	Yes	Yes	2 episodes
2026	Wonder Man	Yes	No	2 episodes
TBA	The Altruists	Yes	Yes	1 episode
