= List of Booknotes interviews first aired in 2003 =

Booknotes is an American television series on the C-SPAN network hosted by Brian Lamb, which originally aired from 1989 to 2004. The format of the show is a one-hour, one-on-one interview with a non-fiction author. The series was broadcast at 8 p.m. Eastern Time each Sunday night, and was the longest-running author interview program in U.S. broadcast history.

First broadcast (with link to transcript / video)	Author	Book	Subject matter
January 5, 2003	Hugh Price	Achievement Matters: Getting Your Child the Best Education Possible	Education in the United States
January 12, 2003	Andrew Roberts	Napoleon & Wellington: The Battle of Waterloo and the Great Commanders Who Fought It	Napoleon Bonaparte; The Duke of Wellington; The Battle of Waterloo
January 19, 2003	Warren Zimmermann	First Great Triumph: How Five Americans Made Their Country a World Power	John Hay; Henry Cabot Lodge; Alfred Thayer Mahan; Theodore Roosevelt; Elihu Root
January 26, 2003	Robert Coram	Boyd: The Fighter Pilot Who Changed the Art of War	John Boyd
February 2, 2003	Stephen Schwartz	The Two Faces of Islam: The House of Sa’ud from Tradition to Terror	Wahhabism
February 9, 2003	Amy Chua	World on Fire: How Exporting Free Market Democracy Breeds Ethnic Hatred and Global Instability	Globalization; Democratization; Middleman minorities
February 16, 2003	Robert Kagan	Of Paradise and Power: America and Europe in the New World Order	Foreign policy of the United States; Politics of Europe
February 23, 2003	Joy Hakim	Freedom: A History of US	A History of US
March 2, 2003	John McWhorter	Authentically Black: Essays for the Black Silent Majority	African Americans
March 9, 2003	Dana Priest	The Mission: Waging War and Keeping Peace with America’s Military	United States Armed Forces
March 16, 2003	Michael Howard	The First World War	World War I
March 23, 2003	Bernard Bailyn	To Begin the World Anew: The Genius and Ambiguities of the American Founders	Founding Fathers of the United States
March 30, 2003	Mona Charen	Useful Idiots: How Liberals Got It Wrong in the Cold War and Still Blame America First	American Left; The Cold War
April 6, 2003	Roy Morris, Jr.	Fraud of the Century: Rutherford B. Hayes, Samuel Tilden, and the Stolen Election of 1876	Rutherford B. Hayes; Samuel Tilden; 1876 United States presidential election
April 13, 2003	Philip Taubman	Secret Empire: Eisenhower, The CIA, and The Hidden Story of America’s Space Espionage	Presidency of Dwight D. Eisenhower; The Central Intelligence Agency; Spy satellites
April 20, 2003 and April 27, 2003	William Taubman	Khrushchev: The Man and His Era	Nikita Khrushchev
May 4, 2003	Dorothy Rabinowitz	No Crueler Tyrannies: Accusation, False Witness, and Other Terrors of Our Times	Day care sex abuse hysteria; Fells Acres day care sexual abuse trial; Gerald Amirault; McMartin preschool trial
May 11, 2003	Monica Langley	Tearing Down the Walls: How Sandy Weill Fought His Way to the Top of the Financial World And Then Nearly Lost it All	Sandy Weill
May 18, 2003	Paul Theroux	Dark Star Safari: Overland from Cairo to Cape Town	Travel literature; Africa
May 25, 2003	Anne Applebaum	Gulag: A History	Gulag
June 1, 2003	Raymond Strother	Falling Up: How a Redneck Helped Invent Political Consulting	Memoir/Autobiography; Political consulting
June 8, 2003	Azar Nafisi	Reading Lolita in Tehran: A Memoir in Books	Memoir/Autobiography; Women's rights in Iran; Politics of Iran; Higher education in Iran
June 15, 2003	Eric Schlosser	Reefer Madness: Sex, Drugs, and Cheap Labor in the American Black Market	Underground economy; Cannabis in the United States; Pornography in the United States; Economic impact of illegal immigrants in the United States
June 22, 2003	Paul Berman	Terror and Liberalism	War on terror; Islamic terrorism
June 29, 2003	Vartan Gregorian	The Road to Home: My Life and Times	Memoir/Autobiography; Iranian Armenians; The Carnegie Corporation
July 6, 2003	Jon Kukla	A Wilderness So Immense: The Louisiana Purchase and the Destiny of America	The Louisiana Purchase
July 13, 2003	Willard Scott	The Older the Fiddle, the Better the Tune: The Joys of Reaching a Certain Age	Memoir/Autobiography; Aging
July 20, 2003	Connie Bruck	When Hollywood Had a King: The Reign of Lew Wasserman, Who Leveraged Talent into Power and Influence	Lew Wasserman
July 27, 2003	Kenneth Ackerman	Dark Horse: The Surprise Election and Political Murder of President James A. Garfield	James Garfield
August 3, 2003	Dorothy Height	Open Wide the Freedom Gates: A Memoir	Memoir/Autobiography; National Council of Negro Women
August 10, 2003	Gretchen Rubin	Forty Ways to Look at Winston Churchill: A Brief Account of a Long Life	Winston Churchill
August 17, 2003	David Lipsky	Absolutely American: Four Years at West Point	The United States Military Academy
August 24, 2003	Adam Bellow	In Praise of Nepotism: A Natural History	Nepotism
August 31, 2003	Robert Darnton	George Washington's False Teeth: An Unconventional Guide to the Eighteenth Century	The Enlightenment; The French Revolution; the 18th century
September 7, 2003	Michael Parenti	The Assassination of Julius Caesar: A People's History of Ancient Rome	Julius Caesar; Assassination of Julius Caesar; Ancient Rome
September 14, 2003	Erik Larson	The Devil in the White City: Murder, Magic, and Madness at the Fair that Changed America	The World's Columbian Exposition; Daniel Burnham; H.H. Holmes
September 21, 2003	Eric Rauchway	Murdering McKinley: The Making of Theodore Roosevelt’s America	Leon Czolgosz; Assassination of William McKinley; Presidency of Theodore Roosevelt
September 28, 2003	Victor Davis Hanson	Mexifornia: A State of Becoming	Mexifornia
October 5, 2003	David Von Drehle	Triangle: The Fire That Changed America	Triangle Shirtwaist Factory fire
October 12, 2003	Jessica Stern	Terror in the Name of God: Why Religious Militants Kill	Religious terrorism; Christian terrorism; Islamic terrorism; Jewish terrorism
October 19, 2003	Lance Morrow	Evil: An Investigation	Evil
October 26, 2003	Jill Jonnes	Empires of Light: Edison, Tesla, Westinghouse, and the Race to Electrify the World	Thomas Edison; Nicola Tesla; George Westinghouse; History of electromagnetism
November 2, 2003	James Bovard	Terrorism and Tyranny: Trampling Freedom, Justice, and Peace to Rid the World of Evil	Criticism of the War on Terror; Civil liberties in the United States
November 9, 2003	Rich Lowry	Legacy: Paying the Price for the Clinton Years	Presidency of Bill Clinton
November 16, 2003	Michael Moore	Dude, Where's My Country?	Criticism of the Iraq War; Enron scandal
November 23, 2003	Tom Coburn	Breach of Trust: How Washington Turns Outsiders Into Insiders	United States House of Representatives; The Republican Revolution
November 30, 2003	Sen. Tom Daschle (D-SD)	Like No Other Time: The 107th Congress and the Two Years That Changed America	107th United States Congress
December 7, 2003	Richard Pipes	Vixi: Memoirs of a Non-Belonger	Memoir/Autobiography; Harvard University; Soviet Union–United States relations
December 14, 2003	Gail Collins	America's Women: 400 Years of Dolls, Drudges, Helpmates and Heroines	History of women in the United States
December 21, 2003	Matthew Pinsker	Lincoln's Sanctuary: Abraham Lincoln and the Soldiers' Home	President Lincoln's Cottage at the Soldiers' Home
December 28, 2003	Carl Cannon	The Pursuit of Happiness in Times of War	Life, liberty and the pursuit of happiness; Home front
