= Absolutely American =

- First edition
- Author: David Lipsky
- Language: English
- Publisher: Houghton Mifflin
- Publication date: July 4, 2003
- Publication place: United States
- Media type: Print (hardback & paperback)
- Pages: 384
- ISBN: 1-4000-7693-5
- Preceded by: The Art Fair
- Followed by: Although of Course You End Up Becoming Yourself

Absolutely American: Four Years at West Point is a 2003 book by American author David Lipsky. It was placed on several top book lists, including Amazon's Best Books of the Year (2003). The work became a New York Times Notable Book and a New York Times bestseller.

== Summary ==
The book recounts four years in the lives of students at the United States Military Academy.

== Excerpts ==
Portions of Absolutely American were published in Rolling Stone magazine and were broadcast on National Public Radio's All Things Considered. An audio excerpt aired on This American Life.

== Plot ==
The book's genesis was a piece Lipsky wrote for Rolling Stone—the longest article published in that magazine since Hunter S. Thompson's Fear and Loathing in Las Vegas. The book follows cadets in one West Point company, G-4, from their arrival to graduation. As Newsweek noted, composition of the book required "14,000 pages of interview transcripts, 60 notebooks and four pairs of boots." As The New York Times wrote, Lipsky was not initially well disposed toward the military: "He was, like most young people, entirely cut off from military life. The Army was the one profession his father absolutely refused to let him consider."

== Reception ==
External videos
- Booknotes interview with Lipsky on Absolutely American, August 17, 2003, C-SPAN

Absolutely American received general acclaim from book critics. In Time, novelist and critic Lev Grossman wrote that it was "fascinating, funny, and tremendously well-written. Take a good look: this is the face America turns to most of the world, and until now it's one that most of us have never seen. A mesmerizing and powerfully human spectacle." Newsweek called the book "addictive". In a front-cover review in The New York Times Book Review, David Brooks called the book "wonderfully told", praising it as both "a superb description of modern military culture, and one of the most gripping accounts of university life I have read." Within a few weeks of publication, the work had sold out of most American distributors. As Sara Nelson reported in the New York Observer,

It's every author's dream: You write a book that everybody loves. It gets fabulous reviews—one of them on the front page of The New York Times Book Review. You appear on the Today show and on C-Span and you tape Charlie Rose. There's even interest from Hollywood—and you fly out to take some meetings. There's only one problem: There are precious few copies of your book to be found in the bookstores—and if someone wants one, they're going to have to wait, sometimes as long as three weeks. That's exactly the situation author David Lipsky found himself in last week.

The work was a New York Times bestseller, New York Times Notable Book, Amazon Best Book of the Year, Time magazine Best Book of the Year, and was selected as required reading for the incoming class at the University of North Carolina at Chapel Hill. Film and television rights were acquired by Disney.

== Awards and honors ==
- 2003 "New York Times Notable Book", The New York Times
- 2003 "Best Books of the Year", Time
- 2003 "Best Books of the Year", Amazon
- 2003 "Best Books of the Year", Providence Journal-Bulletin
- 2003 "Best Books of the Year", San Jose Mercury News
- 2003 "Best Books of the Year", New York Daily News
- 2003 "Eleven Most Remarkable Things in Culture This Month", Esquire
- 2004 "Freshman Reading Program—Class of 2008", University of North Carolina at Chapel Hill
