= David Lipsky =

David Lipsky may refer to:

- David Lipsky (author), American author
- David Lipsky (golfer) (born 1988), American professional golfer
