= The Parrot and the Igloo =

2023 book by David Lipsky

The Parrot and the Igloo: Climate and the Science of Denial
- Author: David Lipsky
- Language: English
- Subject: Climate Change
- Genre: Nonfiction
- Publisher: W. W. Norton
- Publication date: July 11, 2023
- Publication place: United States
- Media type: Print, e-book
- Pages: 496 pp. (hardcover)
- ISBN: 978-0393866704 (Hardcover)
- Preceded by: Although of Course You End Up Becoming Yourself

The Parrot and the Igloo: Climate and the Science of Denial is the third nonfiction book by National Magazine Award-winning American writer David Lipsky.

The book tells the story of two parallel histories: the development of climate science and the attempts to conceal that threat by climate deniers. It was published on July 11, 2023, by Norton. The book is an Amazon Best Book of 2023, a New Yorker Best Book of 2023, a Publishers Weekly Best Book of 2023, and a New York Times Editors' Choice.

== Theme ==
The book tells the overall story of two opposing groups: the people who discovered climate change and the people who attempted to conceal it from the public. As National Public Radio observes: "How did the country go from recognizing the threat of climate change to doing so little to address it for 60 years? Or in Lipsky's own words, this is the story of, 'The people who made our world; then the people who realized there might be a problem; then the people who lied about that problem.'”

== Reception ==
Kirkus Reviews gave the book a starred review, calling it "captivating and disturbing": "An important book that will leave your head shaking." Zoë Schlanger of the Sunday New York Times Book Review wrote,

David Lipsky spins top-flight climate literature into cliffhanger entertainment . . . Lipsky’s book is a project of maximum ambition. He retells the entire climate story, from the dawn of electricity to the dire straits of our present day [and] makes it appropriately infuriating and page turning. He says it up front: He wants this to be like a Netflix series, bingeable . . . "The Parrot" is a thriller of deceptions, side deals and close calls. We get tales of vanity, fame and money.

Publishers Weekly, in its own starred review, called the work "revelatory." David Shribman of The Boston Globe called it, "An excellent, approachable primer on the science of global warming and a dizzying account of how long we have known so much about an issue that means so much." Jason Mark of Sierra Magazine described the work as "This is not a book lacking in ambition. Lipsky wants to tell the whole, sprawling, messy tale of climate change: how modern technology made it all happen, how scientists figured it out, and how a network of hustlers and hucksters distracted the public from the threat before our eyes. In the end he pulls it off, delivering a propulsive read that has the snap of a screenplay. Lipsky is a major talent…My only quibble with this fantastic book is that it ends too soon."Brian Koppelman on The Moment called it, "One of the best books I’ve read in a decade…I promise you this book is worth it. David Lipsky has delivered on the promise of his brilliance in this book." And historian Douglas Brinkley called the work "incredible," adding "you all have to read it." On C-SPAN he explained, "One fear that I had, as a historian―I was worried that these climate-deniers weren't going to pay for it in history. And this book nails them."

== Honors ==
- Amazon Best Books of 2023
- The New Yorker Best Books of 2023
- Publishers Weekly Best Books of 2023
- Chicago Tribune Best Books of 2023
- Vanity Fair Favorite 2023 Authors
- Open Letters Best Books of 2023
- The New York Times Editors' Choice
