= Mabel Pakenham-Walsh =

English painter

- The artist in 2012 with sculpture, Leg of Bont
- Born: Mabel Pakehham-Walsh; September 1922; Lancaster, England
- Died: 19 August 2013 (aged 75); Aberystwyth, Wales
- Known for: Sculpture, Painting, Drawing

Mabel Pakenham-Walsh (2 September 1937 − 19 August 2013) was a British painter, sculptor and designer, and pioneering female artist in post-war European figurative art. She worked in many mediums, but is particularly well known for her colourful wooden relief sculptures. Her work was significantly influenced by primitive and outsider art, and created primarily from recycled materials, earning her recognition as an early eco artist.

== Life ==
Mabel Pakenham-Walsh was born in Lancaster, England, the daughter of Robert Pakenham-Walsh, a prominent psychiatrist. Born with congenital hip dysplasia, she lived with a lifelong physical disability; and in 1957, while a student at university, she was badly injured in a major car accident which compounded her disability. Consequently, Pakenham-Walsh campaigned throughout her life for disability rights, especially for children and youths, ultimately leaving a legacy with the Snowdon Trust to assist disabled students in future. Pakenham-Walsh was active in the London arts scene throughout the 1960s and '70s, and befriended many significant figures, including Lord Snowdon, Frances Bond, Martin Leman, Maeve and Mervyn Peake, Wendy Ramshaw, and Tom Stoppard. Pakenham-Walsh also taught woodcarving classes to Further Education students in Kent, England. In the late 1970s she moved to Aberystwyth, Wales, where she continued to create, and became a local legend and beloved eccentric.

== Education ==
Pakenham-Walsh trained as an artist at Lancaster and Morecambe College of Arts and Crafts (1954–58) and Wimbledon College of Art (1958-59). The writer and artist Mervyn Peake was an early mentor.

== Career ==
From the beginning of her career, Pakenham-Walsh created drawings, paintings, and sculptures made almost exclusively from mundane and salvaged materials; this unique strategy was borne of necessity as Pakenham-Walsh encountered "social barriers associated with being a female artist in the mid twentieth century, which made it difficult for her [...] to acquire raw materials for her art." Pakenham-Walsh's first published artwork was in the early 1960s when her biro drawings appeared in the literary journal Transatlantic Review. At that time, she was employed as a designer at Pinewood Studios, where she created set-pieces for major motion-pictures, including Cleopatra; she also worked as a sculptor at Shepperton Studios. From 1965 to 1982, she exhibited at the Summer Exhibitions of the Royal Academy of Arts in London. During this era, select London artists rejected abstraction and conceptualism to pursue "the depiction of the human figure and everyday landscape"; Pakenham-Walsh also sought to depict ordinary daily life, creating art that was both "playful and profound [to] invoke the deep time of human nature." Pakenham-Walsh "exhibited widely in her lifetime in many art galleries and museums" worldwide. Her work has been shown at the Victoria and Albert Museum, and is held in numerous public and private collections, including: the National Library of Wales, the Ulster Museum, Aberystwyth University, and the UK Craft Council; the actor and art historian Vincent Price and the photographer Lord Snowdon also admired and collected her work.

== Works in public collections ==
Title	Year	Work type	Collection
Love Spoon for Lesbians and Homosexuals	1981	Wood relief	Amgueddfa Ceredigion Museum
Self Portrait	1964	Painting	Llyfrgell Genedlaethol Cymru / The National Library of Wales
Boy George	1985	Sculpture	Amgueddfa Ceredigion Museum
Leg Pontrhydfendigaid	1970-1990	Wood relief	Amgueddfa Ceredigion Museum
Beatles	1979	Wood relief	Amgueddfa Ceredigion Museum

== Selected solo exhibitions ==
- 1984: Mabel Pakenham-Walsh: Painted Wood Carvings and Paintings at Aberystwyth Arts Centre (and tour of UK)
- 2006: Drawings of Aberystwyth and Beyond at Ceredigion Museum
- 2012: Mabel Pakenham-Walsh: A Retrospective of carvings and drawings at Ceredigion Museum.
