= Gretchen Rubin =

American author, blogger and speaker (born 1965)

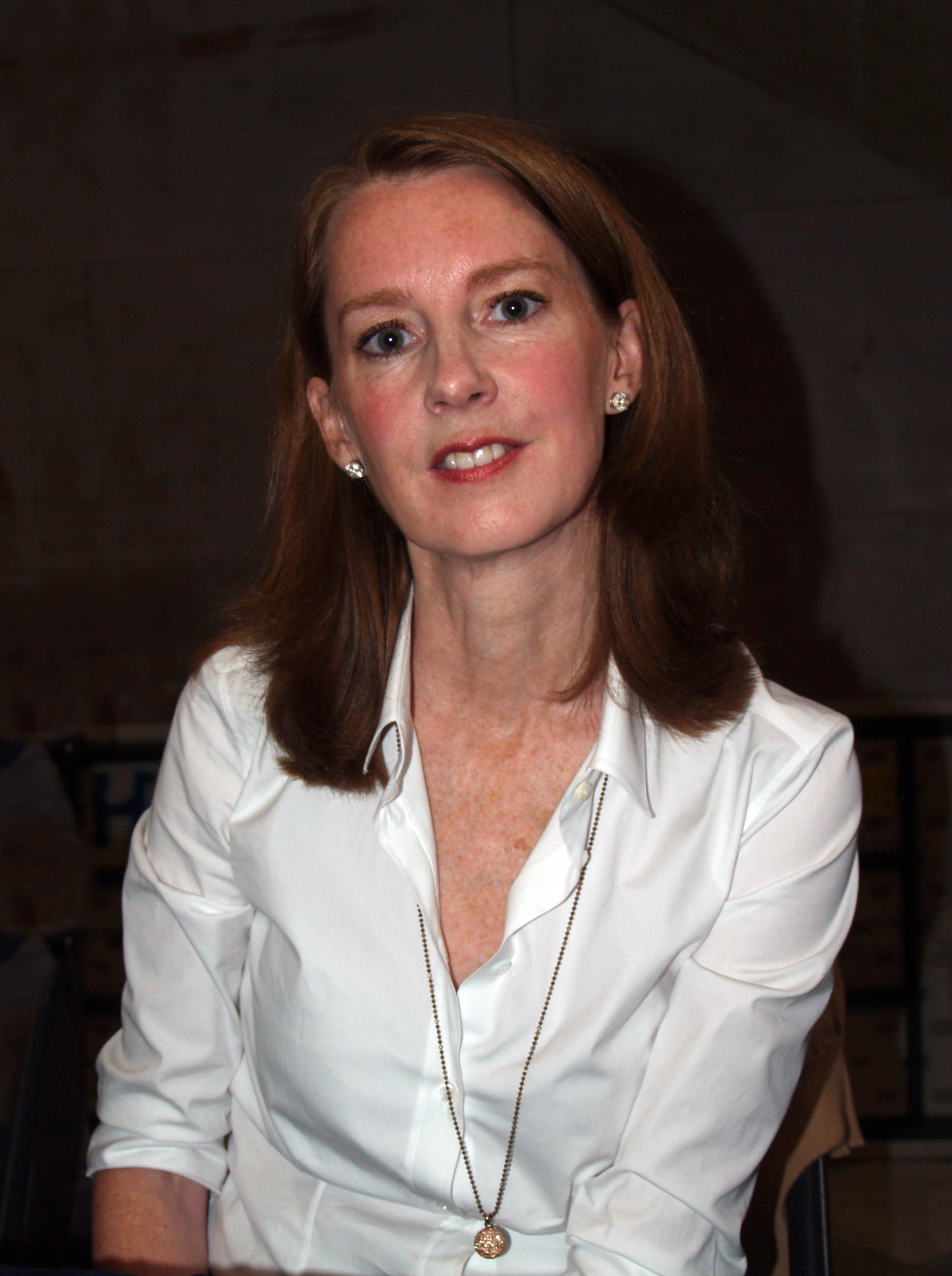
- Rubin at the 2014; Brooklyn Book Festival
- Born: Gretchen Anne Craft; December 14, 1965 (age 60); Kansas City, Missouri, U.S.
- Education: Yale University (BA, JD)
- Occupations: Author blogger speaker
- Spouse: Jamie Rubin (m. 1994)
- Children: 2
- Relatives: Elizabeth Craft (sister)
- Writing career
- Notable works: The Happiness Project; Better Than Before; The Four Tendencies
- Website: Official website

Gretchen Craft Rubin (born December 14, 1965) is an American author, blogger and speaker.

== Early life ==
Born Gretchen Anne Craft, Gretchen Rubin grew up in Kansas City, Missouri, where her father was a lawyer at the firm of Craft, Fridkin & Rhyne. She attended The Pembroke Hill School. She received her undergraduate and law degrees from Yale University, was editor-in-chief of the Yale Law Journal and won the Edgar M. Cullen Prize.

== Career ==
=== Law career ===
Rubin clerked for Judge Pierre N. Leval of the U.S. Court of Appeals for the Second Circuit, and then on the U.S. Supreme Court for Justice Sandra Day O'Connor from 1995 to 1996. After her clerkships, she served as a chief adviser to Federal Communications Commission Chairman Reed Hundt. She has also been a lecturer at the Yale Law School and the Yale School of Management.

=== Writing career ===
Rubin is a writer on subjects of habits, happiness, and human nature. She is the author of the New York Times bestsellers Better Than Before, Happier at Home, and The Happiness Project. Rubin's books have sold more than two million print and online copies worldwide in over thirty languages. On her weekly podcast, Happier with Gretchen Rubin, she discusses good habits and happiness with her sister Elizabeth Craft, a Los Angeles-based television writer. The podcast won the 2016 Academy of Podcasters award for best health and fitness podcast and was a finalist in 2017. On August 10, 2003, Brian Lamb interviewed Rubin on the television show, Booknotes.

She is author of The Happiness Project: Or Why I Spent a Year Trying to Sing in the Morning, Clean My Closets, Fight Right, Read Aristotle, and Generally Have More Fun. On September 4, 2012, Rubin published the follow-up book Happier at Home: Kiss More, Jump More, Abandon a Project, Read Samuel Johnson, and My Other Experiments in the Practice of Everyday Life. Her third book, Power Money Fame Sex: A User’s Guide, parodied self-help books by analyzing and exposing the techniques used to exploit those who strive for those worldly ambitions.

Her book Better Than Before: What I Learned About Making and Breaking Habits--to Sleep More, Quit Sugar, Procrastinate Less, and Generally Build a Happier Life recommends setting manageable goals, and breaking up tasks into small steps. Her two biographies, Forty Ways to Look at Winston Churchill and Forty Ways to Look at JFK uses the "forty ways" structure to explore the complexities of these two great figures and to demonstrate the limits of biography.

Her book, The Four Tendencies: The Indispensable Personality Profiles That Reveal How to Make Your Life Better (and Other People's Lives Better, Too), was published on September 12, 2017.

In 2017, Rubin helped create the "Joy Index," a list of the ten "most joyous" places to visit, based on several "happiness factors".

In March 2019, she published a new book, Outer Order: Inner Calm, in which she continues to trace the connection between happiness and personal habits.

In April 2023, she published a new book, Life in Five Senses: How Exploring the Senses Got Me Out of My Head and Into the World, in which she explored the influences of the five senses on well-being.

In late 2024, she recommended that people invest in broadening and deepening their relationships, for example by volunteering in the community and inviting acquaintances to meet beyond the usual context.

In April 2025, Rubin published Secrets of Adulthood: Simple Truths for Our Complex Lives, a collection of aphorisms.

== Popular culture ==
The Happiness Project was mentioned on the gameshow Jeopardy!. For the category "Glee", the clues were synonyms for the word, including "Gretchen Rubin chronicled a year in which she tried to be more gleeful in a blog and a book called this 'project'." Answer: "Happiness."

== Personal life ==
Rubin lives on Manhattan's Upper East Side in a triplex decorated by Mario Buatta. She married Jamie Rubin, a private equity fund manager, in 1994, and the couple have two daughters. Her father-in-law is Robert Rubin, who served as Secretary of the Treasury under Bill Clinton.

Her husband has Hepatitis C, and this led to Gretchen Rubin joining the board of the New York Organ Donor Network, and advocating for organ donation.

== Writings ==
=== Books ===
- Forty Ways to Look at Winston Churchill: A Brief Account of a Long Life. New York: Ballantine Books, 2003. ISBN 978-0-345-45047-0
- Forty Ways to Look at JFK. New York: Ballantine Books, 2005. ISBN 978-0345450494
- Power Money Fame Sex: A User's Guide. Atria, 2005. ISBN 978-0671041298
- Profane Waste. Gregory R. Miller & Company, 2006. ISBN 978-0974364834
- The Happiness Project: Or Why I Spent a Year Trying to Sing in the Morning, Clean My Closets, Fight Right, Read Aristotle, and Generally Have More Fun. New York, NY: Harper, 2009. ISBN 978-0-06-158325-4
- Happier at Home: Kiss More, Jump More, Abandon a Project, Read Samuel Johnson, and My Other Experiments in the Practice of Everyday Life. New York, NY: Harper, 2012. ISBN 978-0307886781
- Better Than Before: What I Learned About Making and Breaking Habits--to Sleep More, Quit Sugar, Procrastinate Less, and Generally Build a Happier Life. New York, NY: Crown, 2015. ISBN 978-0385348614
- The Four Tendencies: The Indispensable Personality Profiles That Reveal How to Make Your Life Better (and Other People's Lives Better, Too). New York, NY: Crown, 2017. ISBN 1524760919
- Outer Order, Inner Calm. New York, NY: Harmony, 2019. ISBN 9781984822802
- Life in Five Senses: How Exploring the Senses Got Me Out of My Head and Into the World. New York, NY: Crown, 2023. ISBN 978-0593442746
- Secrets of Adulthood: Simple Truths for Our Complex Lives. New York: Crown, 2025. ISBN 9780593800737

=== Articles ===
- Craft, Gretchen A. (1992). "The Persistence of Dread in Law and Literature". The Yale Law Journal. 102 (2): 521–546. doi:10.2307/796846. JSTOR 796846.

== See also ==
- List of law clerks for the eighth seat of the Supreme Court of the United States
