= David Lipsky (author) =

American author (born 1965)

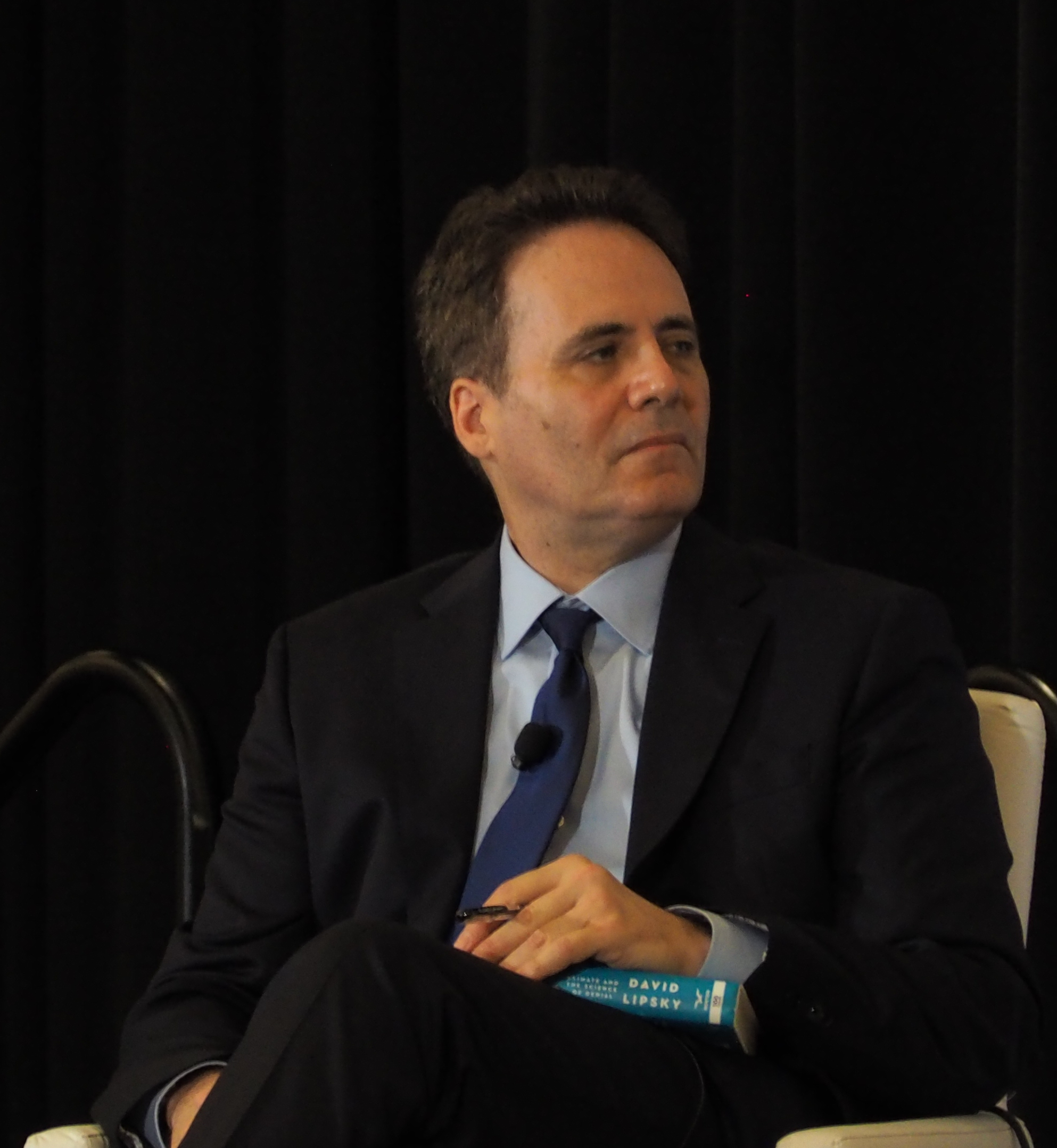
- Lipsky at the National Book Festival, 2023
- Born: New York City, U.S.
- Occupations: Novelist; journalist; short story writer
- Writing career
- Period: 1985–present
- Notable works: Although of Course You End Up Becoming Yourself (2010); Absolutely American (2003); The Art Fair (1996)

David Lipsky is an American author. His works have been New York Times bestsellers, New York Times Notable Books, Time, Amazon, The New Yorker, Publishers Weekly, and NPR Best Books of the Year, and have been included in The Best American Magazine Writing and The Best American Short Stories collections.

Lipsky received the National Magazine Award in 2009. He was portrayed by Jesse Eisenberg in the 2015 feature film The End of the Tour, an adaptation of his memoir Although of Course You End Up Becoming Yourself. He is a contributing editor at Rolling Stone. He currently lives in New York City.

== Background and education ==
David Lipsky was born in New York City, and is the son of the painter Pat Lipsky. He graduated from Stuyvesant High School in 1983 and matriculated at Bennington College. Lipsky transferred in his sophomore year to Brown University, where he graduated magna cum laude and studied with the writer John Hawkes. He received his M.A. from Johns Hopkins University, where he studied with the novelist John Barth. Lipsky currently teaches creative writing at the M.F.A. program at New York University.

As an undergraduate, Lipsky published his story "Three Thousand Dollars" in The New Yorker. It was selected by Raymond Carver as one of the Best American Short Stories of 1986. Carver was surprised by the author's youth, noting in his introduction,

I confess to not having read David Lipsky before this. Have I been asleep and missed some stories of his, or maybe even a novel or two? I don't know. I do know I intend to pay attention from now on.

== Career ==
=== Three Thousand Dollars and The Art Fair ===
As a graduate student, Lipsky wrote the stories that would become his first book, Three Thousand Dollars (1989). The novelist John Gregory Brown explained, "It was kind of apparent that Lipsky might have the brightest future of anyone [here]." The book was well received upon publication, with the trade publication Booklist summarizing, "Critics loved Lipsky's short story collection"; the author was seen to possess "unlimited depth and range of vision," and the stories were compared to the works of F. Scott Fitzgerald. The Los Angeles Times, while noting the book's "astonishing insights into the New York art world," concluded, "Lipsky has given his contemporaries a general autobiography, one that will fit the majority with only minor adjustments."

His novel The Art Fair (1996), a bildungsroman composed of a number of autobiographical elements, tells the story of Richard and Joan Freely—a New York artist and her precocious son. The novel won rave reviews and was named a Time Best Book of the Year. The work earned Lipsky comparisons to writers Michael Chabon and Harold Brodkey. The New York Times called the novel "riveting," The New Yorker described it "a darkly comic love story," People noted, "Lipsky's portrayal of the art world is unblinking, his portrayal of the ties between parent and child deeply affecting"; the critic Francine Prose called the book's "Darwinian" milieu a "testament to Lipsky's skill" and James Atlas wrote "the novel perfectly captures artists and dealers, the tiny gestures of cruelty that confirm or withhold status." The trade publication Library Journal summarized, "The praise has poured as thick as impasto."

=== Although of Course You End Up Becoming Yourself and Absolutely American ===
External videos
- Booknotes interview with Lipsky on Absolutely American, August 17, 2003, C-SPAN

Lipsky's non-fiction book Absolutely American (2003) was written after the author spent four years living at West Point. The book's genesis was a piece Lipsky wrote for Rolling Stone—the longest article published in that magazine since Hunter S. Thompson's Fear and Loathing in Las Vegas. As Newsweek noted, composition of the book required "14,000 pages of interview transcripts, 60 notebooks and four pairs of boots"; the magazine called the book "addictive," and Lev Grossman in Time wrote that it was "fascinating, funny, and tremendously well-written. Take a good look: this is the face America turns to most of the world, and until now it's one that most of us have never seen." In The New York Times Book Review, David Brooks called the book "wonderfully told," praising it as both "a superb description of modern military culture, and one of the most gripping accounts of university life I have read." Within a few weeks of publication, the work had sold out of most American distributors. As Sara Nelson reported in the New York Observer,

It's every author's dream: You write a book that everybody loves. It gets fabulous reviews—one of them on the front page of The New York Times Book Review. You appear on the Today show and on C-Span and you tape Charlie Rose. There's even interest from Hollywood—and you fly out to take some meetings. There's only one problem: There are precious few copies of your book to be found in the bookstores—and if someone wants one, they're going to have to wait, sometimes as long as three weeks. That's exactly the situation author David Lipsky found himself in last week.

The work was a New York Times best-seller, Amazon Best Book of the Year, New York Times Notable Book, and a Time magazine Best Book of the Year. Lipsky optioned the motion picture and television rights to the story to Disney.

In April 2010, Lipsky published Although of Course You End Up Becoming Yourself, about a five-day road trip with the writer David Foster Wallace. In Time Magazine, Lev Grossman wrote, "The transcript of their brilliant conversations reads like a two-man Tom Stoppard play or a four-handed duet scored for typewriter." The Atlantic Monthly called the work, "far-reaching, insightful, very funny, profound, surprising, and awfully human"; at National Public Radio, Michael Schaub described the book as "a startlingly sad yet deeply funny postscript to the career of one of the most interesting American writers of all time." Newsweek noted, "For readers unfamiliar with the sometimes intimidating Wallace oeuvre, Lipsky has provided a conversational entry point into the writer's thought process. It's odd to think that a book about Wallace could serve both the newbies and the hard-cores, but here it is." Publishers Weekly, in a starred review, described the book as "rollicking" and "compellingly real," The Wall Street Journal as "lovely," and Laura Miller in Salon called it "exhilarating." The book was a New York Times best-seller and an NPR Best Book of the Year.

=== The End of the Tour ===
A feature film adaptation of Although of Course You End Up Becoming Yourself, The End of the Tour, was released in July 2015, with Academy Award-nominated actor Jesse Eisenberg portraying Lipsky and Jason Segel portraying Wallace. In his review for The New York Times, critic A.O. Scott wrote, "I love it," adding, "You hang on its every word and revel in its rough, vernacular beauty . . . There will always be films about writers and writing, and this one is just about as good as it gets."

The film received a 92% rating on Rotten Tomatoes, based on 159 reviews, with an average rating of 8.02/10. The site's critical consensus states: "Brilliantly performed and smartly unconventional, The End of the Tour pays fitting tribute to a singular talent while offering profoundly poignant observations on the human condition." The film also holds a score of 82 out of 100 on Metacritic, based on 35 reviews. At Rogerebert.com, critic Brian Tallerico called the film a "joy," and "stunning . . .a gift of highly intellectual discussion between two brilliant people at turning points in their lives," while also praising Jason Segel and Jesse Eisenberg.

The Washington Post's Ann Hornaday gave the film four out of four stars and called it, "A five-day conversation you won't want to end ... Part love story, part road trip, part elegy to a bygone, pre-9/11 age, 'The End of the Tour' brims with compassion and sharply honed insight" about "what it means to be human." In his review for Vanity Fair, Richard Lawson called it a "wise, humbly sublime film ... a profound, and profoundly affecting, movie, one that had me blubbering with happy-sad tears. What a pleasure to spend two hours in its company."

In his review for the New York Daily News, Joe Neumaier awarded the film five out of five stars, calling it "one of the best movies of the year . . . Director James Ponsoldt's smart, incisive and extraordinary drama is the kind of film that burrows into your head and leaves you illuminated about life and how to live it." In her review for The Los Angeles Times, Sheri Linden wrote "James Ponsoldt's magnificent The End of the Tour gives us two guys talking, and the effect is breathtaking ... They're played with a wrought and wary chemistry, synapses blazing, by Jason Segel and Jesse Eisenberg."

In his review for Cut Print Film, Josh Oakley awarded the film a perfect "10/10", calling it "one of the best films of the year", and stating "The End of the Tour presents, with ample evidence, Wallace as a figure who could never fill the holes of loneliness with the spackle of acclaim." In his review for the Chicago Sun-Times, Richard Roeper awarded the film four out of four stars, calling it "brilliant. . .this is one of the best movies of the year." In his review for the Minnesota Star Tribune Colin Covert gave the film four out of four stars, writing, "Simply put, it is a masterwork."

The film featured in numerous "Best of 2015" lists, including The New York Times, Vanity Fair, Vogue, The Guardian, Entertainment Weekly, USA Today, Variety, The Washington Post, Huffington Post Wired, The New Republic.

=== The Parrot and the Igloo ===
In 2023 Norton published Lipsky's The Parrot and the Igloo—a narrative history of climate and the science denial movement. In a starred review, Kirkus called the work "simultaneously captivating and disturbing . . . An important book that will leave your head shaking." In the Sunday New York Times Book Review, Zoë Schlanger wrote, "David Lipsky spins top-flight climate literature into cliffhanger entertainment . . . Lipsky's book is a project of maximum ambition," and called the work "Cinematic...The Parrot is a thriller of deceptions, side deals and close calls." Booklist wrote, "with the amount of research that went into the book, this can be considered the historical record to date." In a starred review, Publishers Weekly called the work "revelatory . . . With dry wit and novelistic flair, National Magazine Award winner Lipsky chronicles how harnessing electricity changed the world," summarizing "Humor accompanies horrific truths in this vital look at the rise of climate change denial." David Shribman of The Boston Globe called it, "Excellent . . . A dizzying account of how long we have known so much about an issue that means so much." Jason Mark of Sierra Magazine described the work as "This is not a book lacking in ambition. Lipsky wants to tell the whole, sprawling, messy tale of climate change: how modern technology made it all happen, how scientists figured it out, and how a network of hustlers and hucksters distracted the public from the threat before our eyes. In the end he pulls it off, delivering a propulsive read that has the snap of a screenplay. Lipsky is a major talent . . . My only quibble with this fantastic book is that it ends too soon."USA Today explained, "Lipsky offers a history of climate science―and with it, climate denial―starring a large cast of swindlers, zealots, politicians and hucksters to get to the heart of virulent anti-science ideologies in America." And historian Douglas Brinkley called the work "incredible," adding "you all have to read it." On C-SPAN he explained, "One fear that I had, as a historian―I was worried that these climate-deniers weren't going to pay for it in history. And this book nails them."

The book featured in numerous "Best of 2023" lists, including Amazon, Publishers Weekly, The New Yorker, The Chicago Tribune.

=== Journalism ===
Lipsky's work has appeared in Rolling Stone, Harper's Magazine, The New Yorker, The New York Times, Details, This American Life, and All Things Considered. He received a GLAAD Media Award for journalism in 1999. In 2009, he received the National Magazine Award.

== Awards and honors ==
- 2023 "Best Books of the Year," Amazon
- 2023 "Best Books of the Year," Publishers Weekly
- 2023 "Best Books of the Year," The New Yorker
- 2023 "Best Books of the Year," Chicago Tribune
- 2023 Favorite Authors of the Year, Vanity Fair
- 2023 The New York Times Editors' Choice
- 2016 Scripter Award (Nominated, The End of the Tour)
- 2010 "Best Books of the Year," NPR
- 2009 National Magazine Award
- 2009 The Best American Magazine Writing
- 2005 Lambert Fellowship
- 2003 "Best Books of the Year," Time Magazine
- 2003 "Best Books of the Year," Amazon
- 2003 "Best Books of the Year," Providence Journal-Bulletin
- 2003 "Best Books of the Year," San Jose Mercury News
- 2003 "Best Books of the Year," New York Daily News
- 2003 "Eleven Most Remarkable Things in Culture This Month," Esquire Magazine
- 2003 "Times Notable Book," The New York Times
- 1999 GLAAD Media Award
- 1988 Henfield/Transatlantic Review Award
- 1986 MacDowell Fellow
- 1986 The Best American Short Stories

== Bibliography ==
=== Non-fiction ===
- Although of Course You End Up Becoming Yourself: A Road Trip with David Foster Wallace (2010)
- Absolutely American: Four Years at West Point (2003)
- The Parrot and the Igloo (2023)

=== Novels ===
- The Art Fair (1996)

=== Short stories ===
- Three Thousand Dollars (1986)

=== Anthologies ===
- The Best American Magazine Writing (2009)
- The Best American Short Stories (1986)
