= Joseph F. McCrindle =

Joseph Feder McCrindle (March 7, 1923 – July 11, 2008) was an American art collector, philanthropist, and founder and editor of Transatlantic Review.

Based in New York and London, McCrindle amassed a distinguished collection that ranged from old master drawings and Italian baroque paintings to pre-Columbian sculptures. During his lifetime, he lent or gave artworks to dozens of institutions including the British Museum, the Metropolitan Museum of Art and the National Gallery of Art.

To fund Transatlantic Review, he established the Henfield Foundation (later renamed the Joseph F. McCrindle Foundation), which distributed McCrindle's art collection to about 30 museums after his death. The National Gallery, for example, received an early-20th-century watercolor by John Singer Sargent and an early-1520s drawing by Polidoro da Caravaggio as well as more than 300 other drawings, many of them by lesser-known artists. As a collector, McCrindle looked for bargains and never paid more than $10,000 for any single work. "It's not a plutocrat's collection," George R. Goldner, chairman of drawings and prints at the Metropolitan Museum, told The New York Times. "He did well because he had a good eye."

== Early life and education ==
McCrindle was born in New York City to Odette Feder, a graduate of Miss Spence's School, and Major John Ronald McCrindle, a British aviator who had served as a Royal Air Force squadron commander during World War I. A year later the couple divorced, and in 1928 Odette Feder married Count Guy du Bourg de Bozas and moved to France, leaving her son—and then his half-brother, Antoine du Bourg—to be raised by her parents, who lived in a Fifth Avenue townhouse designed by Stanford White.

McCrindle's maternal grandparents were Joseph Fuller Feder, a Wall Street financier, and Edith Mosler Feder, daughter of the painter Henry Mosler and granddaughter of Gustave Mosler, who co-founded the Mosler Safe Company. While growing up, McCrindle spent summers in Europe, became fluent in French and began collecting rare books.

He attended St. Paul's School in Concord, New Hampshire, and graduated from Harvard University in 1944. After two years in the U.S. Army, serving mainly in London as a translator in the Office of Strategic Services, McCrindle earned a degree at Yale Law School and then joined a Wall Street law firm, where he worked for less than a year. He also worked briefly at one London and two New York publishing companies before setting out on his own as a literary agent. His clients included L.P. Hartley and, early in their careers, John McPhee and Philip Roth.

== Transatlantic Review and the Henfield Prize ==
With the aim of giving exposure to short stories that he had been unable to sell, McCrindle founded Transatlantic Review in 1959, reviving the name of the short-lived but influential magazine edited by Ford Maddox Ford in 1924. Published quarterly, first in Rome and then in London and New York, Transatlantic Review presented fiction and poetry by young writers alongside new works by well-known literary figures such as Paul Bowles, Iris Murdoch, Joyce Carol Oates, William Trevor and John Updike.

TR also ran an annual erotica contest (Diana Athill, Jerry Stahl and D.M. Thomas were three of its winners) and published interviews with theater and film directors including Ingmar Bergman and Federico Fellini. After the magazine's 10th anniversary, McCrindle edited two anthologies, Stories From the Transatlantic Review (1970) and Behind the Scenes: Theater and Film Interviews From the Transatlantic Review (1971), both published by Holt Rinehart and Winston.

The magazine ceased publication in 1977. Three years later, McCrindle introduced the Transatlantic Review Awards for fiction by students in MFA writing programs. Later renamed the Henfield Prize, the annual awards came with $1,000 to $3,000 grants. Early works by Ethan Canin, David Lipsky, Walter Mosley, Ann Patchett and Mona Simpson were among the winning stories, as was one by Harriet Doerr that became a chapter in her first novel, Stones for Ibarra. A third anthology, The Henfield Prize Stories (Warner Books), appeared in 1992.

== Art collecting ==
McCrindle's art collecting began with “eighteenth- and nineteenth-century political art—the Cruikshanks and James Gillray—which complemented his literary interest,” wrote Frederick A. den Broeder in Old Master Drawings From the Collection of Joseph F. McCrindle, a catalogue that accompanied a 1991 exhibition at the Princeton University Art Museum. Den Broeder, who curated the exhibition, noted that in the 1960s McCrindle spent much of his time in Italy, "a country whose art increasingly appealed to him," and London, "the major center of the market in old master drawings."

That market was only beginning to emerge, and McCrindle acquired hundreds of the drawings before prices took off. He reached his $10,000 spending limit only twice—when he bought a double-sided drawing attributed to Jean-Honoré Fragonard, now at the Cleveland Museum of Art, and a 1760s portrait by Pompeo Batoni, gifted to the National Gallery—according to an essay by John T. Rowe in The McCrindle Gift, the catalogue for a 2012 exhibition at the National Gallery.

Rowe noted that while "the main focus of [McCrindle’s] collection of paintings was the Italian school of the seventeenth and eighteenth centuries," McCrindle also owned paintings by Dutch, Flemish, French, British and American artists. His collection as a whole spanned five centuries, but he showed little interest in contemporary art. According to Rowe, Andy Warhol once offered him one of his pre-pop shoe drawings and McCrindle turned it down.

Other institutions that received bequests of artworks from the McCrindle collection include the Ackland Art Museum at the University University of North Carolina at Chapel Hill, the Brooklyn Museum, the Chazen Museum of Art at the University of Wisconsin–Madison, the Frick Collection, the J. Paul Getty Museum, the Krannert Art Museum at the University of Illinois at Urbana-Champaign, the Minneapolis Institute of Art, the Morgan Library & Museum, the Nasher Museum of Art at Duke University, the Philadelphia Museum of Art and the Yale Center for British Art.

== The Joseph F. McCrindle Foundation ==
Although it was set up to finance Transatlantic Review, the foundation went on to support arts and social justice organizations ranging from the New York Youth Symphony to the Southern Poverty Law Center.

Following instructions in McCrindle's will, the board of directors dissolved the Joseph F. McCrindle Foundation in 2013, having spent down its assets in the five years after his death. In addition to providing grants, the foundation established a number of endowments, including scholarship funds at the Manhattan School of Music and Bennett College in Greensboro, North Carolina; paid internships at the National Gallery and the Princeton University Art Museum; and a paid fellowship at the nonprofit literary organization Poets & Writers.

The foundation also endowed the Henfield Prize, now linked to annual grants of $10,000 to $15,000, at five universities: the University of California–Irvine, Columbia University, the University of Iowa, the University of Michigan and the University of Virginia.

== Archives ==
Digitized papers at the Archives of American Art document McCrindle's art collecting, art donations, philanthropy, family affairs and personal estate.

The Joseph F. McCrindle papers at Columbia University include extensive personal correspondence as well as letters and manuscripts by L.P. Hartley, Philip Roth and other writers represented by McCrindle when he was a literary agent.

The Transatlantic Review Records at Rutgers University include various correspondence as well as manuscripts by TR contributors such as J.G. Ballard, Ann Beattie, Jorge Luis Borges, Paul Bowles, William Burroughs, Ian McEwan, Joyce Carol Oates, Edna O’Brien, Harold Pinter, Paul Theroux, William Trevor and Richard Yates.

All issues of Transatlantic Review have been digitized and archived at JSTOR.
