= Alan Lelchuk =

American writer

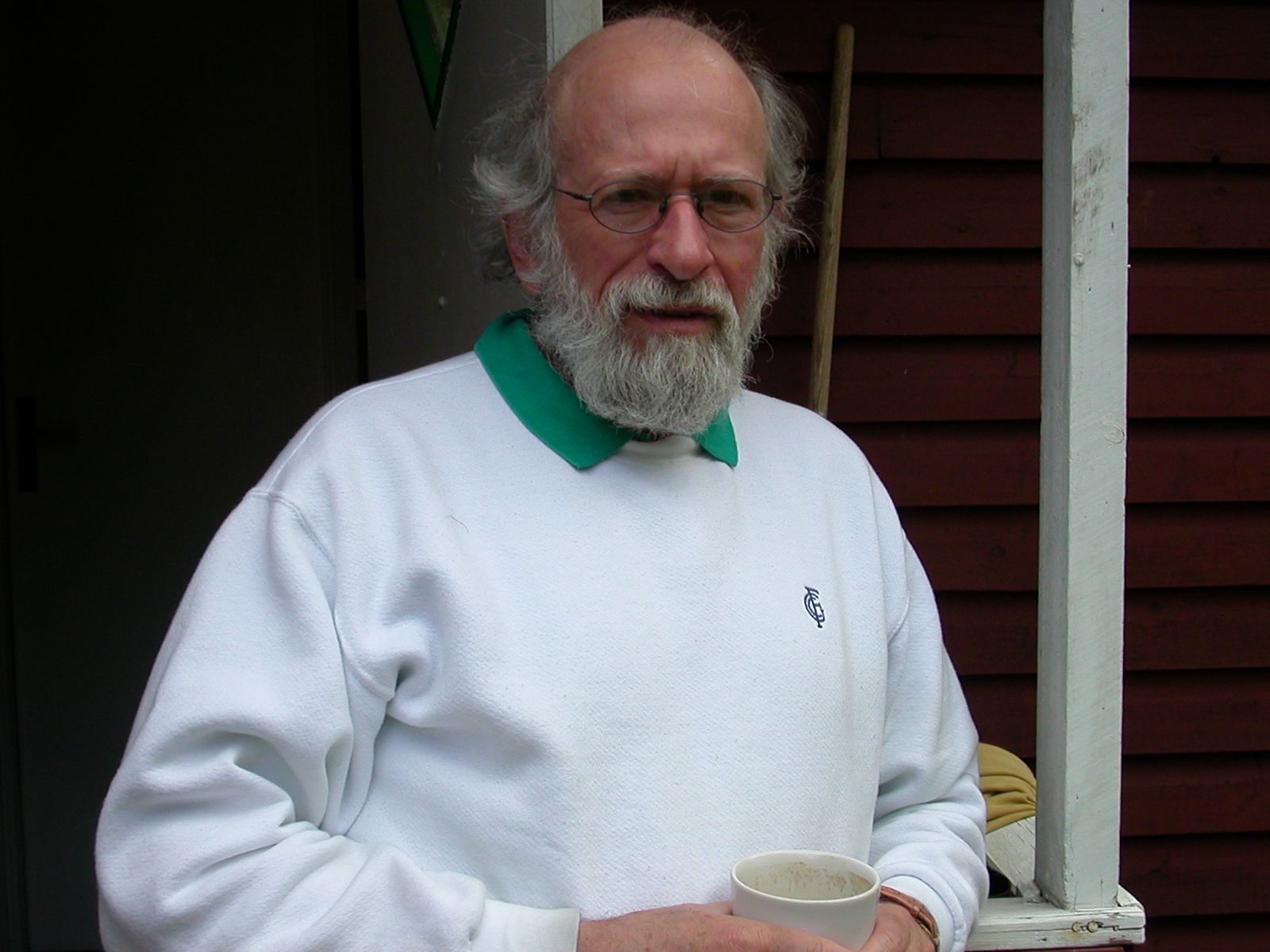
- Born: September 15, 1938 (age 87); Brooklyn, NY
- Education: Brooklyn College (BA); Stanford University (MA, PhD)
- Occupations: Writer, professor
- Spouse: Barbara Kreiger
- Children: 2
- Writing career
- Notable works: American Mischief, Miriam at Thirty-Four, Shrinking: The Beginning of My Own Ending, Miriam in Her Forties, On Home Ground, Brooklyn Boy, Playing the Game, Ziff: A Life? and Searching For Wallenberg.

Alan Lelchuk (born September 15, 1938) is an American novelist, professor, and editor from Brooklyn, New York. He received his B.A. in World Literature from Brooklyn College in 1960 and received his M.A. in 1962 and Ph.D. in 1965, both in English and from Stanford University. He completed a Stanford dissertation fellowship at University College London in 1962–63.

His short fiction has appeared in such publications as Transatlantic Review, The Atlantic, Modern Occasions, The Boston Globe Magazine, and Partisan Review. Significant critical studies on Lelchuk have been Philip Roth in Esquire, Wilfrid Sheed in Book-of-the-Month Club News, Benjamin DeMott in The Atlantic, Mordechai Richler in the Chicago Tribune, and Sven Birkerts in The New Republic.

He began teaching at Brandeis University in 1966, was Visiting Writer for two years at Amherst College, from 1982 to 1984, and has been a member of the Dartmouth College faculty since 1985.

Some awards, honors, and citations include: a Yaddo Foundation Grant in 1968, 1969, 1971, and 1973, a MacDowell Colony Fellowship in 1969 and 1974, a Guggenheim Fellowship in Fiction in 1976–1977, and Fulbright Writer-in-Residence at the University of Haifa, Israel in 1986–1987. In 1999-2000 he was the recipient of the Otto Salgo Chair in American Literature and Writing at Eötvös Loránd University (ELTE) in Budapest, Hungary.

In 2003-2004 he received a Fulbright Award and taught at the International University of Moscow.

In 2005 he was a Fulbright Senior Specialist Professor, giving seminars in fiction writing and American Literature at Moscow State University, Universita di Napoli (Naples, Italy), and Die Freie Universität, Berlin.

He has also served as a visiting professor at the University of Rome, visiting writer at City College of New York, and has been in residence at Mishkenot Sha'ananim in Jerusalem. He has given readings and lectures at numerous institutions such as Harvard University, Yale University, Stanford University, Dartmouth College, Brandeis University, the Boston Public Library, Boston University, Amherst College, University of Southern California, University of South Florida and the American Cultural Center (Jerusalem, Israel).

His manuscripts are housed as "The Alan Lelchuk Manuscript Collection" in the Howard Gotlieb Research Center in the Mugar Memorial Library at Boston University.

In 1994 he co-founded Steerforth Press with Thomas Powers, Chip Fleischer and Michael Moore. and is a member of the independent publisher's editorial board.

He lives in Canaan, New Hampshire.

== Commentary on his work ==
American Mischief

- "No novelist has written with such knowledge and eloquence of the consequences of carnal passion in Massachusetts since The Scarlet Letter." Philip Roth, Esquire

Miriam at Thirty-Four

- "A drastic and original portrait of a woman running for her life, from what she was to what she might be....The best embodiment we have of the illusions, the risks, the rewards of a woman's all-out pursuit of her self." The New York Times

Shrinking, The Beginning of My Own Ending

- "Brilliantly conceived and dazzlingly executed." St. Louis Globe-Democrat
- "Electrifying, inventive... the man can write." Denver Rocky Mountain News
- "Fun and passion… clever and feverish!" The New York Times (A NYT notable book of the year.)

Miriam In Her Forties

- "Mister Lelchuk is a writer of intelligence, sexual sensibility, and drive. Miriam is a full-bodied portrait of a woman who lives hard in our heads... yet she lives with spirit... I expect we'll hear from her again." Samuel Shem, The New York Times Book Review
- "Miriam is not a model or an ideal, but is precisely for her individuality that we value her most. Lelchuk writes with an immense delight in images, in words, and in intransigent mortal particularity. For women who seek answers he offers ambiguity, an ambiguity that is curiously satisfying." Catherine Bateson

On Home Ground

- "On Home Ground raises contemporary questions for its young readers and does so with such skill. It achieves such a success far beyond an exercise in baseball and nostalgia." The New York Times Book Review
