= Transatlantic Review (1959–1977) =

International literary magazine

- Joseph McCrindle's Transatlantic Review ran for 60 issues between 1959 and 1977.
- Categories: literary journal
- Founder: Joseph F. McCrindle
- Founded: 1959
- Final issue: 1977
- ISSN: 0041-1078

Transatlantic Review was a literary journal founded in 1959 by Joseph F. McCrindle, who remained its editor until he closed the magazine in 1977. Published quarterly, at first in Rome and then in London and New York, TR was known for its eclectic mix of short stories and poetry—by both young, previously unpublished writers and prominent authors such as Samuel Beckett, Iris Murdoch, Grace Paley and John Updike—as well as drawings, essays, and interviews with writers and theater and film directors.

== History ==
Reviving the title of the short-lived but influential Transatlantic Review founded by Ford Madox Ford in 1924, McCrindle originally conceived of TR as a way to publish short stories that he had not been able to place as a literary agent. He was inspired in part by the semiannual journal Botteghe Oscure, which was based in Rome and published by Marguerite Caetani. Eugene Walter provided a connection between the two; after helping launch The Paris Review, he edited Caetani's magazine and then became an associate editor of Transatlantic Review, remaining on its masthead from the third issue until the last.

George Garrett was one of a group of initially credited editors, including William Goldman, and by issue 3 became the poetry editor, continuing alongside B. S. Johnson up until issue 39. Another significant contributing editor was the playwright, poet and actor Heathcote Williams.

B. S. Johnson was eventually the sole poetry editor and assembled the feature "New Transatlantic Poetry". He also proposed the annual Erotica competition, which was open to fiction, poetry and illustration. Prize-winners included Paul Ableman, Diana Athill, Gavin Ewart, Giles Gordon, D. M. Thomas, Jerry Stahl, Jay Jeff Jones, Trevor Hoyle, Patrick Hughes and Steve Barthelme.

Issue 52 (Autumn 1975), featured An Anthology of New American Poetry, compiled by Gerard Malanga. It included work by Charles Bukowski, Lawrence Ferlinghetti, Allen Ginsberg, Louis Zukofsky, George Oppen, Jonathan Williams, Gary Snyder, Michael McClure, Harold Norse and Lou Reed.

After a decade, McCrindle selected the magazine's best for his Stories from the Transatlantic Review (Holt, Rinehart and Winston, 1970; Penguin, 1974), an anthology that included Paul Bowles, Jerome Charyn, Bruce Jay Friedman, Penelope Gilliatt, William Goldman and Joyce Carol Oates. McCrindle collected the interviews in Behind the Scenes: Theater and Film Interviews from the Transatlantic Review (Holt, Rinehart and Winston, 1971).

The final issue was published June 1977. An announcement appeared in the penultimate issue of the magazine saying that the title would continue as an annual review but this idea was not pursued. After he folded the magazine, McCrindle continued to support new writing talent through the Henfield Foundation (later renamed the Joseph F. McCrindle Foundation), awarding annual Henfield Prizes for the best short stories from writing programs throughout the United States. He died July 11, 2008, at his home in New York City.

== Writers ==
Other well-known writers whose work appeared in Transatlantic Review include J. G. Ballard, John Banville, Anthony Burgess, William S. Burroughs, Jean Cocteau, William Faulkner, Robert Grossbach, Alan Lelchuk, Alan Sillitoe, Richard Yates, Harold Pinter and William Trevor. Also notable are Eugene Walter's 1960 interview with Gore Vidal and Giles Gordon's 1964 interview with Joe Orton, which appeared shortly before Orton was murdered. Over the years, the magazine published interviews with Edward Albee, Burgess (twice), James T. Farrell, Federico Fellini, William Gaskill, William Inge and Christopher Isherwood, Pinter and Peter Yates.

Campbell Black, a.k.a. Campbell Armstrong, also published in Transatlantic Review: https://www.jstor.org/stable/41513287

After TR was shut down in 1977, annual fiction prizes were given by the Henfield Foundation, later renamed the Joseph F. McCrindle Foundation. In 2011, the McCrindle Foundation set up endowments to support fiction prizes at five graduate writing programs: Columbia University, University of Virginia, University of Iowa, University of Michigan, and University of California, Irvine.

== Illustrators ==
The only issue of Transatlantic Review that did not contain an illustration was the debut issue. The second issue had only one, by Jean Cocteau, but illustration soon became a staple item, usually unrelated to the text but in some cases complementing short stories or articles. Contributors of illustration included Dylan Thomas, Peter Farmer, Elaine de Kooning, Daniel Mroz, Mervyn Peake, Patrick Procktor, Kaffe Fassett, Mike McGear, Heathcote Williams, John(H) Howard, Larry Rivers, Mabel Pakenham-Walsh and Colin Spencer.

== Archives ==
The Transatlantic Review papers, available at Special Collections and University Archives, Rutgers University, include manuscripts by TR contributors such as J.G. Ballard, Ann Beattie, Jorge Luis Borges, Paul Bowles, William Burroughs, Ian McEwan, Joyce Carol Oates, Edna O’Brien, Grace Paley, Harold Pinter, Paul Theroux, William Trevor, John Updike, and Richard Yates.

The Joseph F. McCrindle papers at Columbia University Libraries Archival Collections include, in addition to extensive personal correspondence, letters and manuscripts by L.P. Hartley, Philip Roth, and other writers represented by McCrindle when he was a literary agent.

Digitized papers at the Archives of American Art document McCrindle's art collecting, art donations, philanthropy, family affairs, and personal estate.

All issues of Transatlantic Review have been digitized and archived at JSTOR.

== Contents of Stories from the Transatlantic Review ==
- "Introduction" • Joseph F. McCrindle
- "Music to Lay Eggs By" • Thomas Bridges • 1968
- "Home Is" • Morris Lurie • 1968
- "The Road" • Alan Sillitoe • 1968
- "Summer Voices" • John Banville • 1968
- "Making Changes" • Leonard Michaels • 1969
- "My Sister and Me" • Asa Baber, Jr. • 1967
- "Before the Operation" • Paul Breslow • 1967
- "The Collector" • Austin C. Clarke • 1967
- "Sing, Shaindele, Sing" • Jerome Charyn • 1966
- "Black Barbecue" • Daniel Spicehandler • 1966
- "The Adult Education Class" [from Eating People Is Wrong] • Malcolm Bradbury • 1959
- "During the Jurassic" • John Updike • 1966
- "Acme Rooms and Sweet Marjorie Russell" • Hugh Allyn Hunt • 1966
- "The Zodiacs" • Jay Neugeboren • 1969
- "Dying" • Joyce Carol Oates • 1966
- "The Redhead" • Penelope Gilliatt • 1965
- "Girl in a White Dress" • Edward Franklin • 1964
- "Changed" • Norma Meacock • 1964
- "A Meeting in Middle Age" • William Trevor • 1964
- "The World’s Fastest Human" • Irvin Faust • 1964
- "The Siege" • Sol Yurick • 1963
- "The Enemy" • Bruce Jay Friedman • 1963
- "Simple Arithmetic" • Virginia Moriconi • 1963
- "The Hyena" • Paul Bowles • 1962
- "The Fair of San Gennaro" • John McPhee • 1961
- "Ismael" • Alfred Chester • 1961
- "Francois Yattend" • Jean-Claude Van Itallie • 1961
- "The Star Blanket" • Shirley Schoonover • 1961
- "A Game of Catch" • George Garrett • 1960
- "The Educated Girl" • V. S. Pritchett • 1960
- "Johnny Dio and the Sugar Plum Burglars" • Harry D. Miller • 1960
- "At Home with the Colonel" • Frank Tuohy • 1962
- "A Different Thing" • Walter Clemons • 1959
- "The Ice Cream Eat" • William Goldman • 1959
- "Biographical Notes"
