= Ceredigion Museum =

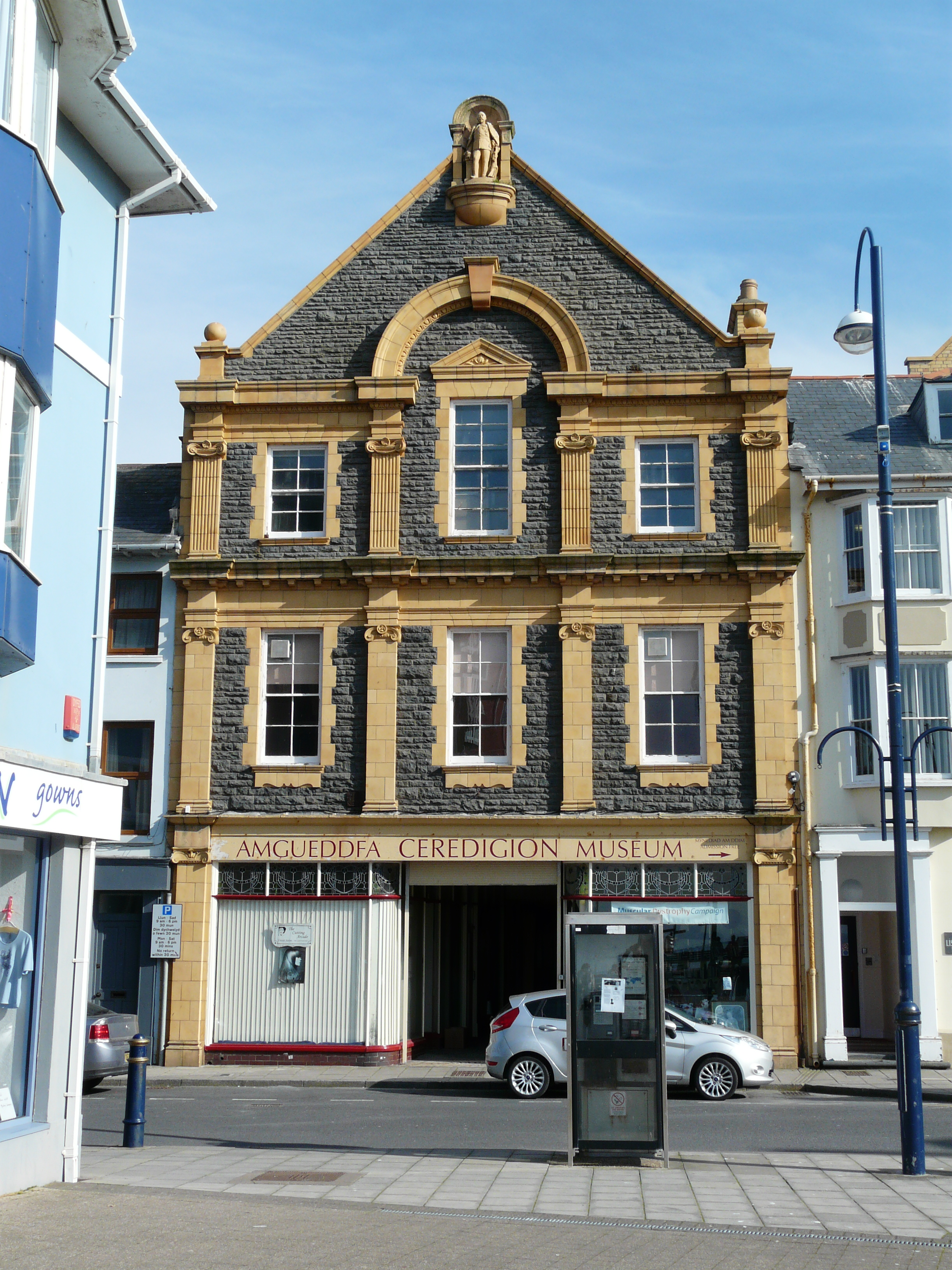

- Location within Ceredigion
- Established: 1972; 54 years ago
- Location: Aberystwyth, Ceredigion, Wales
- Coordinates: 52.4164°N 4.0838°W
- Type: Local museum
- Owner: Ceredigion County Council
- Website: http://www.ceredigionmuseum.wales

Ceredigion Museum (Welsh: Amgueddfa Ceredigion) is a museum in Aberystwyth, Ceredigion, Wales.

== Location ==
Ceredigion Museum is located at the Coliseum, Terrace Road, Aberystwyth. It is housed in a restored Edwardian theatre and is managed by Ceredigion County Council.

== History ==
The museum was established in 1972 by the Cardiganshire Antiquarian Society who gave it to the newly formed Ceredigion District Council in 1974. In 1996, it was transferred to Ceredigion County Council.

Ceredigion Museum is set to close in order to conduct essential repair and maintenance works to the Grade II listed building from 19th May 2025 and is expected to re-open in spring 2026.

== Exhibition and collection ==
The Ceredigion Museum aims to reflect the history and archaeology of the county. There are notable collections of Welsh furniture, costume and many objects associated with the county's farming and agricultural heritage. There is a collection of taxidermy by the Hutchings family (1870s–1942) and many paintings by Alfred Worthington (1835–1925). The museum organises temporary exhibitions on local history and art, and has displays at Lampter Library, the Kite Centre in Tregaron and the Harbourmaster's office in New Quay. It also owns a cottage at Llanon which is open during most August afternoons.

== Friends organisation ==
The museum is supported by the Friends of Ceredigion Museum.
