= Joy Hakim =

American historian

Joy Hakim (born January 16, 1931) is an American author who has written a ten-volume history of the United States, A History of US, and Freedom: A History of US (a trade book to accompany a 16-part PBS series), all published by Oxford University Press. Hakim is also the author of The Story of Science, three volumes co-published by Smithsonian Books and the National Science Teachers Association.

== Background ==
Hakim is a graduate of Rutland High School in Rutland, Vermont. She has earned a bachelor's degree from Smith College and a master's degree and honorary doctorate from Goucher College.

She was a schoolteacher in Syracuse, New York, Omaha, Nebraska, and Virginia Beach, Virginia. Hakim was also an assistant editor of McGraw-Hill's World News in New York City, a reporter for the Norfolk Ledger-Star and a business writer for The Virginian-Pilot, also located in Norfolk. In 1978, she became the first woman to be an associate editor and editorial writer for the Virginian-Pilot.

== Published work ==
Hakim's first published work was the ten-volume A History of US, from Oxford University Press in 1993. The book is written as a narrative history intended for young readers. The Story of Science is co-published by Smithsonian Books and the National Science Teachers Association (NSTA). The first volume, Aristotle Leads the Way was published in 2004; Newton at the Center was published in 2005; and Einstein Adds a New Dimension followed in 2007. A History of US was turned into a 16-part PBS television series. Stride, Inc. has made an abridged 4 volume Concise Edition of A History of US. Teachers materials to accompany the books are available from the teacher/educator CSOS team at Johns Hopkins University. NSTA has also made teaching materials available on their website.

Hakim has had much of her work published as e-books. The 10 volume e-book version of A History of US, text-only e-books from Oxford, is now joined by the three-volume e-book version of The Story of Science. Aristotle Leads the Way, Newton at the Center, and Einstein Adds A New Dimension have recently been made available as illustrated e-books from the Smithsonian.

The recently published Reading Science Stories is an e-book filled with stories of scientific adventurers (Joy Hakim, June 11, 2015). Some stories are adapted from The Story of Science, some are new.

Free To Believe (or not) is an illustrated e-book that tells the story of religious freedom in America. (Joy Hakim; 1 edition, June 2, 2016).

== Recognition ==
Hakim's books earned her the first James A. Michener Award for Writing by the National Council for Social Studies and two Parents' Choice awards.

Now in a revised third and fourth editions, incorporating new materials and corrections, books from A History of US have been recommended to accompany the Common Core curriculum. The books are also used in some home school curricula. In 1995, Pulitzer Prize-winning historian David McCullough went before the United States Senate Committee on Health, Education, Labor and Pensions in support of a bill sponsored by Lamar Alexander (R-TN) and Ted Kennedy (D-MA) intended to improve the teaching and learning of history. McCullough gave a scathing attack on the state of textbooks, but cited Hakim's book as an exception: "Joy Hakim's new...multi-volume History of the United States is superb. But others are dismal almost beyond describing.".
