= A History of US =

1995 book by Joy Hakim

- Author: Joy Hakim
- Subject: United States History
- Publisher: Oxford University Press
- Publication date: 1995 (1st ed.)

A History of US is a ten-volume (and one sourcebook) historical book series for children, written by Joy Hakim and first published in its entirety in 1995. The series is published by the American branch of Oxford University Press and is currently in its third edition. Originally conceived as a trade children's series, the books quickly found fans among classroom teachers; in response to the prompting of educators Oxford University Press developed ancillary teaching materials to accompany the series. Branded as 'alternatives to traditional textbooks' the series is regularly used in both public and private schools, usually in middle school classes. The books are all written in a personal tone, as if the author were a storyteller. The texts have been released to ample praise by teachers, home-schoolers, students, and many others. The series has won the James A. Michener Award in Writing and the Parent's Choice Gold Award.

== Content ==
The books are titled:

1. The First Americans: Prehistory–1600
2. Making Thirteen Colonies: 1600–1740
3. From Colonies to Country: 1735–1791
4. The New Nation: 1789–1850
5. Liberty for All? 1820–1860
6. War, Terrible War: 1855–1865
7. Reconstructing America: 1865–1890
8. An Age of Extremes: 1880–1917
9. War, Peace, and All That Jazz: 1918–1945
10. All the People: Since 1945

The eleventh volume is a sourcebook and index, containing full text of the primary sources—usually government documents, speeches, or famous writings—referenced throughout the series and words.

== Reception ==
The series won the James A. Michener Award in Writing from the National Council of the Social Studies in 1997 and the Parents' Choice Gold Award in 1995 for a Reference book for ages 9–12. The series has sold millions of copies and was accepted as a textbook in several U.S. states. David McCullough, a Pulitzer Prize-winning author of history books, praised A History of US before a U.S. Senate subcommittee hearing in 2005.

Although it has received positive reviews from most people, some conservative critics have alleged that the works are politically-biased.

A series of reviews in 2000–2001 in The Textbook Letter, a publication of the Textbook League, criticized various aspects of the first two books of A History of US. In a review of volume 2, Making Thirteen Colonies: 1600–1740, Alice Whealey noted many claims regarding the history of Western civilization as erroneous, focusing on republicanism, Moorish Spain, and Abrahamic religious stories presented as fact. Also regarding volume 2, Earl Hautala wrote that Hakim's inclusion of the Bible stories of Abraham and Moses is unjustified and incorrect from both a Biblical and a non-Biblical perspective. William J. Bennetta argued that volume 1, The First Americans: Prehistory–1600, presented a politicized multicultural view of early history. A Portland Oregon parent brought serious concerns to her school district regarding the dehumanizing portrayal of slaves and the minimization of the suffering of Indigenous peoples during the chapters covering colonization.

== Adaptation ==
A television miniseries titled Freedom: A History of US was aired on PBS in 2003.

=== Voice cast ===
Hosted by Katie Couric. the series featured an ensemble voice cast playing multiple historical and fictional characters throughout the show's run. The cast included:

- Jane Alexander
- Jennifer Aniston -
- Angela Bassett
- Philip Bosco
- Matthew Broderick
- Billy Bush
- Michael Caine
- Chevy Chase
- Glenn Close
- Dabney Coleman
- Sean Connery
- Harry Connick Jr.
- Billy Crystal
- Blythe Danner
- Michael Douglas
- Charles S. Dutton
- Ralph Fiennes
- Morgan Freeman
- Richard Gere
- Whoopi Goldberg
- John Goodman
- Graham Greene
- Tom Hanks
- Anthony Hopkins
- Jeremy Irons
- Samuel L. Jackson
- Stacy Keach
- Robert F. Kennedy Jr.
- Kevin Kline
- John Lithgow
- Matthew McConaughey
- Monique Mojica
- Paul Newman
- Brad Pitt
- Dennis Quaid
- Aidan Quinn
- Robert Redford
- Dana Reeve
- Ving Rhames
- Julia Roberts
- Al Roker
- Susan Sarandon
- Campbell Scott
- John Seigenthaler
- Martin Sheen
- Kevin Spacey
- Meryl Streep
- Raoul Trujillo
- Stanley Tucci
- Robin Williams
- Reese Witherspoon
- Joanne Woodward
- Kristi Yamaguchi
