= Amazon's Best Books of the Year =

Annual literary award by Amazon.com

Amazon's Best Books of the Year is a list of best books created yearly by Amazon.com. It is a list of best books picked by Amazon editors and customers. It began in 2000. Customer favorites are ranked according to the number of sales made through October, for books published in that calendar year. The lists are usually announced in early November. The list has garnered attention from media such as The Guardian, CBS News and others.

According to Sarah Gelman, Editorial Director, Amazon Books, "The Books Editorial team reads thousands of new releases every year", with the intention of making recommendations. There are monthly lists, and from those a year-end list is created. According to an Amazon Books spokesperson, "Many of the editorial picks for the best books are also customer favorites and bestsellers, but they strive to spotlight the best books readers might not otherwise hear about, too."

== Best Books of the Year ==
2000

2001

- Top 25 Editors' Picks.
- Top 25 Customer Favorites.

2002

- Top 50 Editors' Picks.
- Top 50 Customer Favorites.

2003

- Top 50 Editors' Picks.
- Top 50 Customer Favorites.

2004

- Top 50 Editors' Picks.
- Top 50 Customer Favorites.

2005

- Top 50 Editors' Picks.
- Top 50 Customer Favorites.

2006

- Top 50 Editors' Picks.
- Top 50 Customer Favorites.

2007

- Top 100 Editors' Picks.
- Top 100 Customer Favorites.

2008

- Top 100 Editors' Picks.
- Top 100 Customer Favorites.

2009

- Top 100 Editors' Picks.
- Top 100 Customer Favorites.

2010

- Top 100 Editors' Picks.
- Top 100 Customer Favorites.

2011

- Top 100 Editors' Picks.
- Top 100 Customer Favorites.

2012

- Top 100 Editors' Picks.

2013

- Top 100 Editors' Picks.

2014

- Top 100 Editors' Picks.

2015

- Top 100 Editors' Picks.

2016

- Top 100 Editors' Picks.

2017

- Top 100 Editor's Picks.

2018

2019

2020

2021

2022

2023

== 100 Books to Read in a Lifetime ==
Amazon editors released a list of 100 best books to read in a lifetime.
