= Pat Lipsky =

American artist

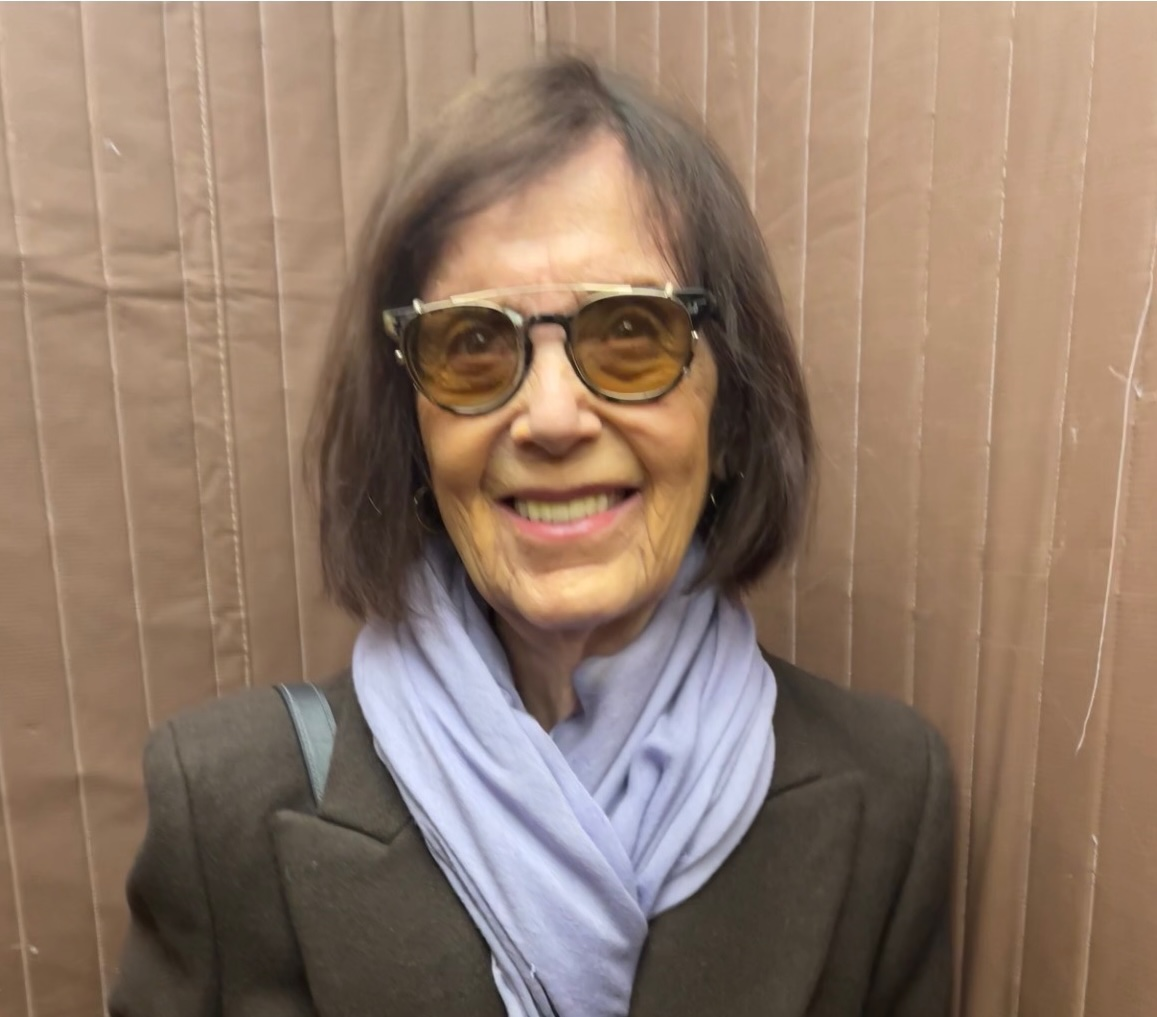
- Lipsky in February 2025
- Born: September 21, 1941 (age 85); New York City, U.S.
- Education: Hunter College (MFA, 1968); Cornell University (BFA, 1963)
- Known for: Painting, printmaking, writing
- Movement: Lyrical Abstraction, Color Field Painting
- Children: David Lipsky, Jonathan Lipsky
- Awards: 2008, 2001 Pollock-Krasner Foundation Grant; 2001 American Academy and Institute of Arts and Letters Hassam Speicher Betts Purchase Prize; 1999 Adolph and Esther Gottlieb Foundation Grant; 1992 New York Foundation for the Arts
- Website: patlipsky.com

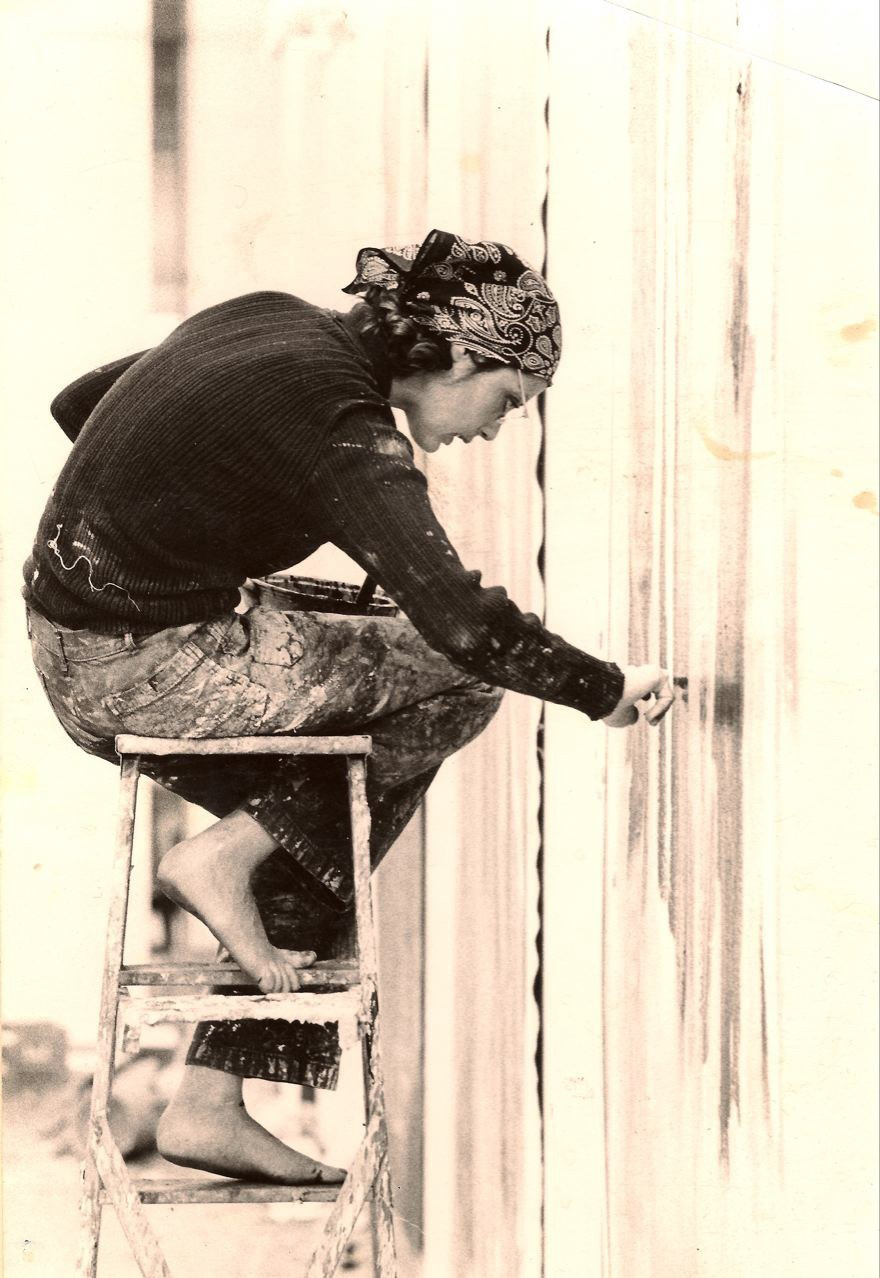
Lipsky painting in 1974

Pat Lipsky is an American painter. Her work is associated with Color Field painting and Lyrical Abstraction.

== Early life and education ==
Lipsky grew up in New York City. She graduated with a Bachelor of Fine Arts BFA from Cornell University in 1963, and then received an MFA from the Graduate Program in Painting at Hunter College in Manhattan, where she studied with the painter and sculptor Tony Smith.

== Career ==
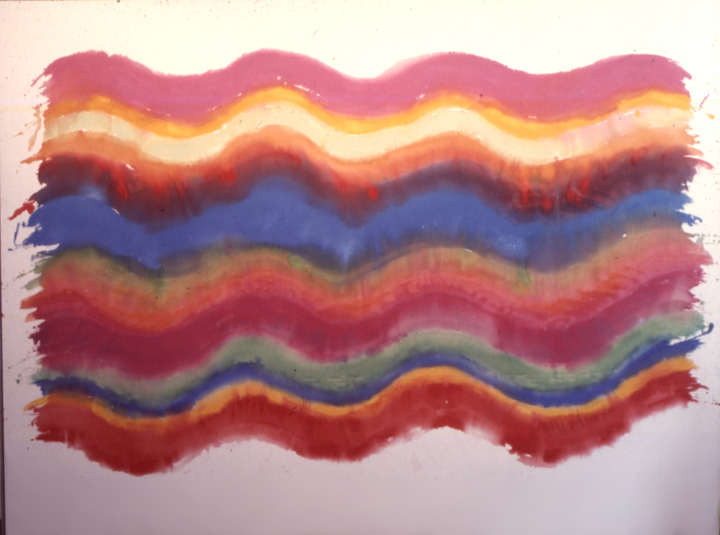
Lipsky's Spiked Red, a 1969 acrylic on canvas at the Modern Art Museum of Fort Worth

Raised by a painter mother and an engineer father, Lipsky had her first one-woman show in New York, at the André Emmerich Gallery. Her work at the time was strongly in the mode of "Lyrical Abstraction." The 1969 canvas Spiked Red (Collection of the Modern Art Museum of Fort Worth, Gift of Mr. and Mrs. Peter Bienstock, New York) demonstrates Lipsky's then-approach: close hues, bright color waves and bursts. In The New York Times, the critic Hilton Kramer found that the painter's work looked both to the aesthetic past and future: "Miss Lipsky reintroduces the drip, splatter and smear of abstract expressionism for notable anti-expressionist purposes ... She also demonstrates a very clear identity of her own. Her pictures are very handsome, and it will be interesting to see how she develops what is already a bold pictorial intelligence."

Lipsky was invited to participate in the influential 1970-1971 Lyrical Abstraction exhibition which traveled the country and culminated at New York's Whitney Museum; the critic Noel Frackman highlighted her contributions for freshness, gesture and exuberance, finding the style "sustained a mood which celebrates the sheer splendor of color. The edges of these shapes lick out like flames and there is an incendiary vividness in the impetuous yet directed forms ... These are mouth-watering paintings."

By the later seventies and eighties, Lipsky had expanded her palette to include bolder colors and geometric forms. She had also begun to explore, as the critic Katherine Crum later wrote, a pictorial vocabulary in direct challenge to her roots in lyrical abstraction. By 2003, the critic Karen Wilkin would declare Lipsky in The New Criterion to be an "unrepentant abstract painter." Wilkin found in the work, "A lifetime's accumulated experience of all kinds, including the experience of looking at art. That, of course, is what all art worth taking seriously—whether abstract, figurative, or somewhere in between—is supposed to address."

In the 1980s and 1990s Lipsky continued to refine her broader color concerns, achieving a brooding, more sharply defined palette. A selection of works from this period, "The Black Paintings," was exhibited in Miami in 1994 and New York City in 1997. Wilkin found the "deliberately limited" dark work of this period to be "dramatic" and "powerful." The critic Elisa Turner again described them as a step away from the "sleekness" of modern abstract painting, toward the direction of vertigo, emotion, and ambiguity: "This vertigo adds an unnerving, emotionally-charged twist to the tradition of sleek, impersonal abstract art ... Such ambiguity about the location of lines and shapes in space is echoed in her exquisite sense of color." The New Yorker magazine instead drew a connection of her work in this period to the "classic" style of calmly modernist painters Piet Mondrian and Paul Klee.

In the 2000s, Lipsky began another redefinition of palette, reincorporating color within a bold central image. Writing in the New York Times, the critic Ken Johnson associated these pictures with mechanical forms and music. Noting their "seductive, egg-shell surfaces," Johnson linked them to the minimalist painters Frank Stella and Ad Reinhardt. "The effect is polyrhythmic in three dimensions; the bands seem to push up and down like valves in a machine[,] enhancing the feeling of Bach-like musicality. The more you gaze at them, the more absorbing they become." Lipsky began to focus on single images presented in series. Her more recent exhibitions have contained repeating colors, in a stripped and repeated form. The painter and critic Stephen Westfall, in Art in America, called these paintings "her most successful," finding her "classicism" to be "ultimately idiosyncratic in the best sense," and finding a link to Ad Reinhart and Philip Guston: "Guston meeting Reinhardt, then; a synthesis that, however full of painting culture, feels just right in our present moment." The critic David Cohen, in The New York Sun, noted instead the opposite of classicism, "a steely, seemingly dispassionate composure" that contained "seething reserves of aesthetic emotion," stating, "Lipsky is not merely the dean of contemporary geometric abstraction but its dominatrix."

Karen Wilkin, reviewing Lipsky's 2006 exhibition, discovered in the work a simplicity that served the reverse function—to be ultimately liberating: "Lipsky's complex, richly allusive counterpoint demands that we pay close attention to her paintings as paintings ... and then rewards us by setting free our imaginations."

In 2015, Lipsky's most recent decades of paintings were exhibited at Boston's Acme Fine Arts, "Pat Lipsky: Twenty Years." Critic Cate McQuaid, in the Boston Globe called the work "breathing and organic, restrained and voluptuous."

In 2016, twenty paintings from Lipsky's early years were rediscovered after having been preserved for nearly a half century. Eleven were exhibited the next spring at Gerald Peters Gallery in New York. As critic Carter Ratcliff wrote in his catalogue essay, "Lipsky emerged in the forefront of a generation of painters," and added "Each of these paintings draws us into the extended exuberant moment of its creation—intuiting the artist’s power to reconcile uninhibited spontaneity with disciplined judgement." Lipsky is represented by James Fuentes Gallery.

== Collections ==
Lipksy's paintings are represented in twenty-five public collections, including The Whitney Museum, The Smithsonian's Hirshhorn Museum, The San Francisco Museum of Modern Art, The Boca Raton Museum of Art, The Walker Art Center, The Brooklyn Museum of Art, and Harvard's Fogg Art Museum.

== Influences ==
While Lipsky is sometimes identified with the Post-Painterly Abstraction school centered around the critic Clement Greenberg, a long-time friend of the painter, others have disputed this view. In a 2007 interview, Lipsky listed a broad range of influences, from outside the field of visual arts:

I'm interested in what 'difference' means. My reading of Proust and Eliot, my viewing of Bellini and Giorgione and Titian and Albers and Cornell and Pollock, my listening to Bach and Thelonious Monk, my liking Eric Rohmer and Monty Python might seem totally unrelated, but they teach the same lesson: differences matter. When Monk plays a single note instead of another, a piece is either saved or ruined. When Albers puts a white next to a yellow, the yellow is changed—and the white is changed too. If Proust chooses to follow one character instead of another, to write fifty pages instead of four, the reader's experience is altered in the most intimate and immediate way. We look at works of art as single large units—but they're actually composed of hundreds, of thousands of individual and tiny units, each one a decision. It's those units that I've been experimenting with throughout my career.

Lipsky has also discussed the influence of first-generation abstract expressionists like Mark Rothko and Jackson Pollock, along with second-generation painters like Helen Frankenthaler and Morris Louis, as well as her mentor, Tony Smith.

== Writing ==
Lipsky's essays and criticism have appeared in Tablet, Public Books, The New Criterion, among others. In Fall 2024, it was announced that Lipsky's memoir Brightening Glance would be published in Fall 2025: "A revealing portrait of the struggles and sacrifices, joys and excitement inherent in a contemporary painter's life."

== Honors ==
- 2012 Department of State, Art in Embassies
- 2008 National Academy of Design Invitational Exhibition
- 2008 Pollock-Krasner Foundation Grant
- 2003 Lincoln Center Print Editions Keyboard Variations
- 2001 American Academy and Institute of Arts and Letters Hassam Speicher Betts Purchase Prize
- 2000 Pollock-Krasner Foundation Grant
- 1999 Adolph and Esther Gottlieb Foundation Grant
- 1999 Jerome Foundation, Dark Love (the Black Paintings)
- 1998 New York Foundation for the Arts, Dark Love
- 1998 New York State Council on the Arts, Dark Love
- 1996 New York Foundation for the Arts, Painting in Ireland
- 1992 New York Foundation for the Arts, Painting in France
- 1972 New York State Council on the Arts

== Bibliography ==
- History of International Art, Mario Monteverdi (Editor), Universita' Della Arti, Italy, 1981–1992.
- Trends and testimonies of Contemporary Art, Accademia Italia, Salsomaggiore, Italy, 1983.
- Women Artists in America, 18th Century to the Present, Jim Collins and Glenn Opitz (Editors), New York, 1980.
- Who's Who In American Art, Allison McGowan (Editor), 2004 (25th Edition).
- Pat Lipsky Papers, Lipsky, Pat, Smithsonian Archives of American Art, Washington, D.C., 1997.
- Pat Lipsky: An Interview by Ira Goldberg, LINEA | How Artists Think, New York, 2013
