= Although of Course You End Up Becoming Yourself =

2010 memoir by David Lipsky

- First edition
- Author: David Lipsky
- Language: English
- Publisher: Broadway Books
- Publication date: April 13, 2010
- Publication place: United States
- Media type: Print
- Pages: 352
- ISBN: 0-307-59243-X
- Preceded by: Absolutely American
- Followed by: The Parrot and the Igloo

Although of Course You End Up Becoming Yourself: A Road Trip with David Foster Wallace is a 2010 memoir by David Lipsky about a five-day road trip with the author David Foster Wallace. It is based upon a Rolling Stone magazine story that received the National Magazine Award.

Lipsky, a novelist and contributing editor at Rolling Stone magazine, recounts his time spent with the author of Infinite Jest at the moment when Wallace realized his work would bring him fame, and that this would change his life. The book was a National Public Radio Best Book of the Year, a New York Times Book Review Editors' Choice, and a New York Times bestseller.

A feature film adaptation entitled The End of the Tour was released in July 2015 to critical acclaim.

The novel's title is taken from one of Lipsky's conversations with Wallace in the novel.

== Story ==
Lipsky, who received a National Magazine Award for writing about Wallace in 2009, here provides the transcript of, and commentary about, his time accompanying Wallace across the country just as Wallace was completing an extensive "book tour" promoting his novel, Infinite Jest. The format captures almost every moment the two spent together—on planes and cars, across the country—during the specific time period when Wallace was becoming famous; the writers discuss literature, popular music and film, depression, the appeals and pitfalls of fame, dog ownership, and many other topics.

== Reception ==
Although of Course You End Up Becoming Yourself was positively received by critics. In Time magazine, Lev Grossman wrote, "The transcript of their brilliant conversations reads like a two-man Tom Stoppard play or a four-handed duet scored for typewriter." The Atlantic Monthly called the work, "far-reaching, insightful, very funny, profound, surprising, and awfully human"; at National Public Radio, Michael Schaub described the book as "a startlingly sad yet deeply funny postscript to the career of one of the most interesting American writers of all time", calling it "crushingly poignant, both endearing and fascinating. At the end, it feels like you've listened to two good friends talk about life, about literature, about all of their mutual loves". Newsweek noted, "For readers unfamiliar with the sometimes intimidating Wallace oeuvre, Lipsky has provided a conversational entry point into the writer's thought process. It's odd to think that a book about Wallace could serve both the newbies and the hard-cores, but here it is." Publishers Weekly, in a starred review, described the book as "a rollicking dialog ... a candid and fascinating glimpse into a uniquely brilliant and very troubled writer". The Wall Street Journal called it "lovely", and Laura Miller in Salon described it as "exhilarating". Maria Bustillos, in an essay for The Awl, wrote, "I can't tell you how much fun this book is ... It's a road picture, a love story, a contest: two talented, brilliant young men with literary ambitions, and their struggle to understand one another." "Spurred by a rapidly developing feeling of friendship toward Lipsky", wrote critic Richard Brody in The New Yorker, "Wallace speaks of himself with a profuse, almost therapeutic candor, delivering a spoken autobiography ... In Lipsky's book, Wallace's voice is startlingly present, but so are his ideas, his immediate emotional responses to circumstances, and his own complex range of perspectives on the circumstances at hand ... His remarks to Lipsky are as quietly hilarious as they are ingenious."

The book was a New York Times bestseller, New York Times Editors' Choice, and a National Public Radio Best Book of the Year.

== Honors ==
- 2010 NPR Best Books of the Year
- 2010 New York Times Book Review Editors' Choice
- 2010 New York Times bestseller
- 2009 National Magazine Award

== See also ==
- The End of the Tour
