= Sara Nelson (editor) =

American editor, book reviewer and consultant

- Education: Andover
- Alma mater: Yale University
- Occupations: Editor, book reviewer consultant, author
- Years active: 1980–present
- Employer: Amazon.com
- Notable work: Book So Many Books, So Little Time (2003)

Sara Nelson is an American publishing industry figure who is an editor and book reviewer and consultant and columnist, and is the editorial director at Amazon.com. Nelson was previously editor in chief at Publishers Weekly from 2005–2009 during a time of restructuring and industry downsizing. After that, she was book editor at Oprah's O Magazine. Her book So Many Books, So Little Time was published in 2003.

== Early life ==
Nelson graduated from Yale in 1978 and Phillips Academy in Andover in 1974. She wrote about books and publishing at the New York Post, the New York Observer, Glamour magazine, and held editorial positions at Self, Inside.com, and Book Publishing Report. Nelson married and had a child and is an advocate for respect for working mothers.

Nelson embarked on a project to read one book each week and write about it, and the effort morphed into a book entitled So Many Books, So Little Time: A Year of Passionate Reading which was published by Putnam in 2003. While her initial book–a–week plan fell apart almost immediately, according to New York Times book reviewer Ihsan Taylor, the effort was fruitful since the book was seen as a commentary on the "nature of reading itself." Nelson's future employer, Publishers Weekly, reported that her book revealed her "infectious enthusiasm for literature in general." Writer Augusten Burroughs said Nelson's book was a "smart, witty, utterly original memoir about how every book becomes a part of us."

== Career ==
Nelson became editor–in–chief of the trade magazine Publishers Weekly in January 2005. New York Times reporter Edward Wyatt suggested that the top job at Publishers Weekly in 2005 involved facing "many challenges". In her new position, Nelson added a new assessment for books called a "signature review". Paid circulation dropped by 3,000 to 25,000 in the mid-2000s. Nelson pushed for significant changes towards modernization, greater use of the Web, and more focus on analytical reporting.

In 2008, Nelson commented on the intersection of political candidates, books, and television celebrities such as Oprah Winfrey and Obama. Nelson was interviewed on National Public Radio on Winfrey's influence, similar to that of radio personality Imus, in the publishing arena.

Nelson wrote about Twitter writers signing book deals, Jonathan Littell's controversial 1,000 page Holocaust novel, and realignments of publishing firms. She commented on trends in changing technology, such as the coming of digital books such as Amazon's Kindle.

In 2009, Nelson was dismissed from Publishers Weekly. The action was widely covered in newspapers.

In September 2009, Nelson was appointed book editor at Oprah's O Magazine. She continued to comment in the media about new forces in publishing such as the new quarterly literary magazine called Electric Literature. Nelson appeared with Harry Smith of CBS News on The Early Show. She's also served as moderator for events sponsored by the LA Times Festival of Books.

== Publications ==
- So Many Books, So Little Time: A Year of Passionate Reading, Putnam, 2003.
