= The End of the Tour =

2015 film by James Ponsoldt

- Theatrical release poster
- Directed by: James Ponsoldt
- Screenplay by: Donald Margulies
- Based on: Although of Course You End Up Becoming Yourself by David Lipsky
- Produced by: James Dahl; Matt DeRoss; David Kanter; Mark Manuel; Ted O'Neal
- Starring: Jason Segel; Jesse Eisenberg
- Cinematography: Jakob Ihre
- Edited by: Darrin Navarro
- Music by: Danny Elfman
- Production companies: Anonymous Content; Kilburn Media; Modern Man Films
- Distributed by: A24
- Release dates: January 23, 2015 (Sundance); July 31, 2015 (United States)
- Running time: 106 minutes
- Country: United States
- Language: English
- Box office: $3 million

The End of the Tour is a 2015 American biographical film directed by James Ponsoldt and written by Donald Margulies. It is based on David Lipsky's 2010 memoir Although of Course You End Up Becoming Yourself (2010), which is about a five-day road trip he had with the author David Foster Wallace. The film stars Jason Segel and Jesse Eisenberg as Wallace and Lipsky, respectively.

Margulies first read Lipsky's memoir in 2011, and sent it to Ponsoldt, a former student of his, who took on the job of director. Filming took place in early 2014 in Michigan, with scenes also shot at the Mall of America. Danny Elfman provided the score, with the soundtrack featuring songs by musicians like R.E.M. and Brian Eno, whose inclusion was based on the kind of music Wallace and Lipsky listened to.

The End of the Tour premiered at the Sundance Film Festival on January 23, 2015, and was theatrically released by A24 in U.S. theatres on July 31, 2015. It grossed $3 million and received critical acclaim, particularly for the performance of Segel. He received Best Actor nominations from various awards groups, including the Independent Spirit Award for Best Male Lead.

== Plot ==
Writer David Lipsky is dismayed to hear about the suicide of novelist David Foster Wallace in 2008. He had interviewed the author over a period of days twelve years earlier, following the publication of Wallace's novel Infinite Jest, which received critical praise and became an international bestseller, a touchstone for numerous readers. He listens to the recordings he made during their time together.

The film returns to 1996, shortly after the book's release. Although initially skeptical of the high praise Wallace's book is receiving, Lipsky – a writer having only marginal success – is awestruck after reading it. He persuades his editor at Rolling Stone magazine to give him an assignment to interview Wallace during his book tour.

The journalist travels to meet Wallace at his home on the outskirts of Bloomington-Normal, Illinois (near Illinois State University where the author teaches writing). Lipsky finds the young author unassuming and amiable, but indifferent to being interviewed. Wallace permits Lipsky to tape-record their conversations, with the proviso that Lipsky won't use any direct quotes which Wallace asks to have taken "off the record" five minutes later. Wallace opens up to Lipsky on a variety of subjects, ranging from dogs to television to fame and self-identity, but remains somewhat guarded. He tacitly admits to alcoholism, but offers few details of his experience. Lipsky's mention of Wallace's brief voluntary institutionalization under a suicide watch causes some friction between them.

As their conversation continues late into the night, Wallace invites Lipsky to stay in his unused "guest room", rather than a motel. The room is dominated by stacks of his books. They resume the interview in the morning. Lipsky also accompanies Wallace for a few days to Minneapolis-Saint Paul, where Wallace has the final appearance of his book tour. There they meet two women friends of Wallace: Betsy, whom he knew in graduate school, and Julie, a literary critic; the men spend time with the women later that night and the next day at the Mall of America. Although Wallace and Lipsky generally get along well, Wallace becomes angry when he sees Lipsky flirting with Betsy.

After their return to Wallace's home, tension increases when Lipsky asks the author about rumors of past heroin abuse. Wallace denies it, accusing Lipsky of looking for a stereotypical angle from which to write his article. As their time comes to an end, the two spend a morning together, mainly as new friends rather than as journalist and subject. Lipsky summons the nerve to give Wallace a copy of his own novel, and they agree to stay in touch. Twelve years later, Wallace dies by suicide in his house.

The closing passage is set fourteen years later, when Lipsky is on his own book tour. He reads from his memoir, Although of Course You End Up Becoming Yourself (2010), based on their 1996 encounter. He recounts the road trip he had with Wallace, reflecting on ideas the two had discussed and how their conversations made Lipsky less lonely.

== Cast ==
- Jason Segel as David Foster Wallace
- Jesse Eisenberg as David Lipsky
- Ron Livingston as Bob Levin
- Anna Chlumsky as Sarah
- Joan Cusack as Patty Gunderson
- Mickey Sumner as Betsy
- Mamie Gummer as Julie
- Becky Ann Baker as Bookstore manager

== Production ==
=== Development ===
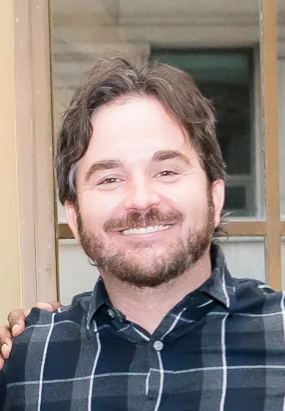
James Ponsoldt was sent the screenplay by screenwriter Donald Margulies, who was also Ponsoldt's former professor at Yale University.

Lipsky's 2010 memoir Although of Course You End Up Becoming Yourself was a New York Times bestseller and an NPR Best Book of the Year. Lipsky also received the National Magazine Award in 2009 for writing about David Foster Wallace. Time magazine's Lev Grossman wrote, "the transcripts of their brilliant conversations read like a two-man Tom Stoppard play," and NPR's Michael Schaub called the book "crushingly poignant ... startlingly sad yet deeply funny."

In 2011, Pulitzer Prize–winning playwright Donald Margulies read the memoir. "Here was a story of two men circling each other," Margulies told the Los Angeles Times. "It was all there." He wrote a screenplay based on Lipsky's book. A few lines were additionally inspired by Wallace's posthumous novel The Pale King. Margulies included material that Lipsky shared with him about time with Wallace off-tape and which he had not included in his memoir. Margulies pointed out,

"What Lipsky shared with me is that moment that some people have accused me of creating. As being too Hollywood. [Laughs]. When in fact it was something that Lipsky didn't include in his book because he felt that it got in the way of Wallace's voice. Because that was really what he was trying to convey in that book... That moment that occurs between the two guys in Julie's kitchen, I wouldn't have known if David Lipsky hadn't shared that with me. Not to sound too coarse about it, but it provided me with my third act. Because it's a turn that occurs. A schism that occurs that changes the tenor of what follows. Dramatically speaking, I felt that that was absolutely necessary. And serendipitous that such a thing actually occurred, and that David Lipsky was generous enough to share it with me, and gave me permission to include it in the film. So there were things that I pulled to it that were not in the book. But certainly not anything that didn't happen."

Margulies sent the completed script to James Ponsoldt, his former student at Yale University and a Sundance Award-winning director. The New York Times has described him as "A devoted David Foster Wallace fan himself." Ponsoldt had excerpts read at his wedding from Wallace's memorable commencement speech "This is Water", at Kenyon College. (Ponsoldt told The Wall Street Journal he had read Wallace since high school, and that Infinite Jest "was the most substantive relationship of my freshman year.") Ponsoldt later told The A.V. Club about his response to being offered the script by Margulies: "I was flattered. I was excited. I was very nervous. I was hyper-aware of Lipsky's book. Wallace is a hero to me." He continued, "When I read it, I was deeply, deeply moved and blown away by what Donald had pulled off."

Ponsoldt discussed the project's history with an interviewer, "[Lipsky's] book came out in 2010. It was a 'New York Times' bestseller. He wrote it with the support of some of David Foster Wallace's family. They're thanked prominently in the acknowledgements. The article that Lipsky had written for 'Rolling Stone' when Wallace died won a National Magazine Award. Our film was made with the support of people who knew Wallace, who aided in the making of the film." Margulies explained, "We've approached this with such, we think, humanity." Speaking with Time magazine, David Lipsky related that before sending the memoir to publishers, he asked for the Wallace family's approval. Segel told the Los Angeles Times, "My personal feeling in taking on the movie and especially in seeing it is that it's a real extension of David Foster Wallace's themes and writing." Vanity Fair's Richard Lawson reported, "His estate does not endorse this movie. But Segel, and Ponsoldt, and everyone else involved do him wonderful justice anyway. By the end of the tour, we truly feel the weight and impact of what a loss for our culture Wallace's death was."

=== Casting ===
Eisenberg was cast as David Lipsky in December 2013. Eisenberg told the Orange County Register he had been a fan of Wallace's work since college. "I just thought it was phenomenal." An admirer of Margulies' plays, it took him "no time at all to accept the part," Eisenberg said. With a screenplay, "You only really have the story and the characters to judge, and this had a wonderful story, wonderful characters." Eisenberg spent time with Lipsky learning how to accurately portray a journalist. Wired, after observing that "there has been enough conversation over the meaning and implications of director James Ponsoldt's fourth feature The End Of The Tour to rival the page count of Infinite Jest," praised Eisenberg's performance as "the best part of the film," deserving of "awards attention."

According to The New York Times, Segel was nervous about taking the part as David Foster Wallace. But "paging through the screenplay, Mr. Segel felt a rush of recognition." Preparing for the role, Segel listened exhaustively to Lipsky's recordings, watched online clips of Wallace, and assembled a small book club to read Infinite Jest. He told The New York Times that when he bought the novel, the saleswoman rolled her eyes. "She said, 'Infinite Jest. Every guy I've ever dated has an unread copy on his bookshelf.'" Segel's performance as David Foster Wallace was called "a revelation" by Entertainment Weekly, "stunning" by Vanity Fair, and "infinitely impressive" by the Chicago Sun-Times. Matthew Jacobs of The Huffington Post wrote, "It's early, but let's prep Jason Segel's Oscar campaign just to be safe."

Mickey Sumner was cast as Wallace's classmate Betsy. "It was a movie about David Foster Wallace," she explained, "whom I adored and loved." Anna Chlumsky—playing Sarah, Lipsky's girlfriend—told Variety she was attracted by the depth of Margulies' screenplay. By March 18, 2014, Academy Award-nominated actor Joan Cusack had joined the cast as Wallace's Minneapolis–Saint Paul escort, Patty Gunderson. On March 19, 2014, Ron Livingston joined the cast as Rolling Stone editor Bob Levin.

=== Filming ===
Principal photography began on February 19, 2014, in Grand Rapids, Michigan, and Hudsonville, Michigan, and continued for five weeks. On March 19, 2014, it was announced that filming was taking place at JW Marriott Grand Rapids and shooting was said to wrap soon. Around March 20, 2014, Muskegon County Airport was used for scenes representing Chicago O'Hare Airport and a fuselage of an Embraer 145 in Muskegon hangar was used for aircraft interior scenes. Around March 21, some scenes were filmed at the Mall of America and near the Third Avenue Bridge in Minneapolis.

=== Music ===
The film's soundtrack, written by Danny Elfman, was released by Lakeshore Records on July 24, 2015. Supervised by Tiffany Anders, the soundtrack features songs by Alanis Morissette, R.E.M., Brian Eno, and Felt. There is also a cover by Tindersticks of Pavement's ballad "Here". Director James Ponsoldt told ComingSoon.net, "From early on, R.E.M. and Brian Eno were a band and a musician that sort of factored into the time that David Lipsky and David Foster Wallace spent together. And they had conversations about what they listened to. So I knew that R.E.M. and Eno would feature in the movie." Reviewing Elfman's score at Soundtrack Dreams, Minhea Manduteanu wrote, "From 'Walking the dog' on, everything fell into place. It's not by accident that this final section includes a cue by Brian Eno. Elfman channeled his inner Eno in those cues and it worked magic."

== Release ==
On December 9, 2014, it was announced the film would receive its premiere at the 2015 Sundance Film Festival. On January 23, 2015, A24 acquired distribution rights to the film. The film debuted at the Sundance Festival's Eccles Theater on January 24, 2015. The premiere earned what New York and USA Today called "rave" and "glowing reviews". The New York Times reported, "Mr. Segel's performance – empathetic, nuanced, whip smart – left the packed theater breathless."

The End of the Tour began a limited theatrical release on July 31, 2015, distributed by A24 Films.

== Reception ==
=== Critical response ===
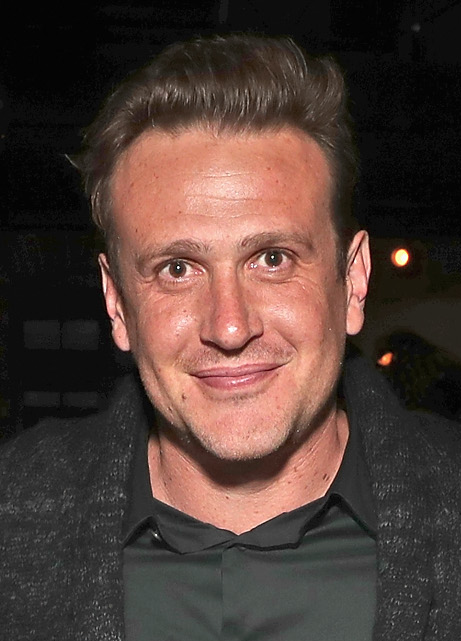
Jason Segel's performance as David Foster Wallace received critical acclaim.

The film received a 92% rating on Rotten Tomatoes, based on 161 reviews, with an average rating of 8/10. The site's critical consensus states: "Brilliantly performed and smartly unconventional, The End of the Tour pays fitting tribute to a singular talent while offering profoundly poignant observations on the human condition." The film also holds a score of 82 out of 100 on Metacritic, based on 35 reviews.

At RogerEbert.com, critic Brian Tallerico called the film a "joy," and "stunning ... a gift of highly intellectual discussion between two brilliant people at turning points in their lives", while also praising Jason Segel and Jesse Eisenberg.

In his review for The New York Times, A.O. Scott wrote, "I love it ... You hang on its every word and revel in its rough, vernacular beauty ... This one is just about as good as it gets." Entertainment Weekly gave the film an "A−" rating and Chris Nashawaty wrote it was "thoughtful and deeply affecting ... The real revelation (an overused word, but it truly applies here) is Jason Segel... It's a profoundly moving story". Matthew Jacobs of HuffPost cited Jason Segel's portrayal of Wallace as one of the 23 best performances of 2015.

The Washington Post's Ann Hornaday gave the film four out of four and called it, "A five-day conversation you won't want to end... Part love story, part road trip, part elegy to a bygone, pre-9/11 age, 'The End of the Tour' brims with compassion and sharply honed insight" about "what it means to be human". In his review for Vanity Fair, Richard Lawson called it a "wise, humbly sublime film... a profound, and profoundly affecting, movie, one that had me blubbering with happy-sad tears[.] What a pleasure to spend two hours in its company." Lawson especially praised Segel's performance as "a stunning, career-defining performance."

In his review for the New York Daily News, Joe Neumaier awarded the film five out of five, calling it "one of the best movies of the year ... Director James Ponsoldt's smart, incisive and extraordinary drama is the kind of film that burrows into your head and leaves you illuminated about life and how to live it." Neumaier called Segel's work "an award-worthy performance". In her review for the Los Angeles Times, Sheri Linden wrote "James Ponsoldt's magnificent The End of the Tour gives us two guys talking, and the effect is breathtaking ... They're played with a wrought and wary chemistry, synapses blazing, by Jason Segel and Jesse Eisenberg."

In his review for Rolling Stone, Peter Travers called the film "riveting" and "mesmerizing", writing "As the details accumulate, so does the power of the film, an illuminating meditation on art and life ... That's what makes the movie, elevated by two extraordinary actors, an exhilarating gift." In her review for Slate, Dana Stevens called the film, "A movie of ideas that contains actual ideas", writing "I greatly enjoyed it." In his review for Cut Print Film, Josh Oakley awarded the film a perfect "10/10", calling it "one of the best films of the year", and stating "The End of the Tour presents, with ample evidence, Wallace as a figure who could never fill the holes of loneliness with the spackle of acclaim." In his review for the Chicago Sun-Times, Richard Roeper awarded the film four out of four stars, calling it "brilliant ... this is one of the best movies of the year".

In his review for the Minnesota Star Tribune, Colin Covert gave the film four out of four, writing, "Simply put, it is a masterwork."

Wallace's literary estate was not approached to participate in the film: it did not give permission for — and ultimately opposed — the film. Many friends have also criticized the film. Glenn Kenny in the Guardian describes it as "risible". He links to other friends who object to the film and particularly what they see as the banal rendering of the complexity of David Foster Wallace. In an article for The Awl, journalist and critic Maria Bustillos objects to people objecting. She wrote, "Any honest effort to discuss, to understand, and to build on the conversation Wallace’s work began should be honored by readers in the spirit of intellectual curiosity and open-heartedness he himself embodied in his short life." Bustillos cites Wallace's "candor and brotherliness" as an example for "a whole generation of readers" to, perhaps, follow themselves.

The film appeared on many critics' lists of the best films of 2015.

- 15th – A.O. Scott, The New York Times
- 7th – Richard Lawson, Vanity Fair
- 8th – John Powers, Vogue
- 22nd – The Guardian
- Best of 2015 (not ranked) – Entertainment Weekly
- 9th – Nate Scott, USA Today
- 1st – Ramin Setoodeh, Variety
- Top 10 runner-ups (not ranked) – Ann Hornaday, The Washington Post
- Top 10 (not ranked) – K.M. McFarland, Wired
- 5th – Tim Grierson, The New Republic

=== Accolades ===
Award	Category	Recipient(s)	Result	Ref(s)
Chicago Film Critics Association	Best Actor	Jason Segel	Nominated	
Chlotrudis Society for Independent Films	Best Actor	Jason Segel	Nominated	
Chlotrudis Society for Independent Films	Best Adapted Screenplay	Donald Margulies	Nominated	
Golden Trailer Awards	Best Independent	The End of the Tour	Nominated	
Golden Trailer Awards	Best Independent Poster	The End of the Tour	Won	
Independent Spirit Awards	Best Male Lead	Jason Segel	Nominated	
Independent Spirit Awards	Best Screenplay	Donald Margulies	Nominated	
Indiana Film Journalists Association Awards	Best Film	The End of the Tour	Nominated	
Indiana Film Journalists Association Awards	Best Adapted Screenplay	Donald Margulies	Nominated	
Indiana Film Journalists Association Awards	Best Director	James Ponsoldt	Nominated	
Indiana Film Journalists Association Awards	Best Actor	Jason Segel	Nominated	
Indiana Film Journalists Association Awards	Best Supporting Actor	Jesse Eisenberg	Nominated	
San Diego Film Critics Society	Best Actor	Jason Segel	Runner-up	
Seattle International Film Festival	Best Actor	Jason Segel	3rd Place	
USC Scripter Award	Best Adapted Screenplay	Donald Margulies	Nominated	
