= Beethoven's Assassins =

2023 novel by Andrew Crumey

- Cover
- Author: Andrew Crumey
- Language: English
- Genre: Literary fiction
- Publisher: Dedalus Books
- Publication date: 7 July 2023
- Publication place: United Kingdom
- Pages: 511
- ISBN: 9781912868230
- Preceded by: The Great Chain of Unbeing

Beethoven's Assassins is a novel by Andrew Crumey, nominated by publisher Dedalus Books for the 2023 Booker Prize. It imagines Beethoven being commissioned by a masonic lodge to write an opera about the Order of Assassins, called "The Assassins, or Everything is Allowed". The opera's subtitle comes from "Nothing is true and everything is allowed", which was the Assassins' secret doctrine according to Beethoven's acquaintance Joseph von Hammer-Purgstall.

The novel has multiple storylines set in different time periods with real-life characters including Therese van Beethoven (wife of Nikolaus Johann van Beethoven), Anton Schindler, J.W.N. Sullivan and Katherine Mansfield. The storylines vary in tone from comic to serious.

The first storyline is narrated by Beethoven's sister-in-law Therese and is comic. The second is narrated by a modern-day professor writing an article about "Beethoven and Philosophy". His work is interrupted by the pandemic and he starts writing about the troubles of his elderly parents during lockdown. After the pandemic he goes to a writing retreat in a Scottish country house where he resumes the Beethoven article.

There are other storylines set in the same house at different times. In 1823 the house is owned by a retired colonel connected to the masonic lodge who commissioned the opera. In 1923 the house is a psychiatric hospital visited by J.W.N. Sullivan, who in real life was an expert on Beethoven and physics. Sullivan investigates a woman able to recall past lives, and learns about the opera.

In Beethoven: His Spiritual Development, Sullivan argued that art is a kind of knowledge, different from scientific knowledge and complementary to it. Beethoven's Assassins develops this theme. The plot involves mesmerism, clairvoyance and psychic healing, mentioning Beethoven's connections with practitioners such as Johann Malfatti and Ludwig Schnorr.

== Reception ==
Ruth McKee wrote in The Irish Times: "a deliciously intellectual, ambitious book that explores time, metaphysics, narrative and pretty much everything, all at once."

The Financial Times described Beethoven's Assassins as "an ambitious, entertaining novel full of comic brio", concluding, "Beethoven’s Assassins is impeccably ambitious, reliably entertaining and a little over the top."

The Scotsman called it "a brilliantly well-informed 200-year history of philosophy, science, music and mysticism, touched with an edge of Da Vinci Code hocus pocus," and remarked on "the sheer fun and narrative energy of Crumey’s writing, the skill and insight with which he conjures up each of his narrators from the repellent to the poignant, and the huge ingenuity with which he interweaves their stories."

The Herald (Glasgow) commented, "Beethoven's Assassins may be a gloriously multi-faceted puzzle-box of a novel, but even those anticipating a dense, abstruse intellectual exercise of interest only to literary theorists will find themselves drawn in by its well-drawn characters and emotional weight... Beethoven's Assassins is that refreshing thing, a novel of ideas with all the intrigue and momentum (and occasional red herring) of an absorbing mystery, underscored by a dark, ironic sense of humour."

Paul Griffiths wrote in Literary Review, "Crumey gives each of his chapters its own period and central character, and flips from one to another with the dexterity and humour of a champion juggler. Matters of art, science and philosophy are deftly discussed and sometimes linked to each other within the narrative."

The Spectator judged Beethoven's Assassins "great cerebral fun, with its quantum physics, telepathy, time travel and fraying of fact and fiction. But all this is its own misdirection... The writing here about the soul-grinding nature of the bureaucracy surrounding illness and death is chillingly good. The questions the novel poses about science and aesthetics (is Einstein as good as Beethoven?) pale in comparison to the rawness of the loss it depicts with the same scrutiny as an equation or a late quartet."

The Historical Novel Society said, "This is a book to appeal to readers who enjoy time-travel, mystery, illusion – and no clear-cut answers."

The Crack said, "Beethoven's Assassins is a huge knickerbocker glory of a novel that weaves together history, art, science, music, and more. Philosophical, but funny with it."

== Connections with other books by Crumey ==
Beethoven's Assassins features the Coyle family (Joe, Ann and their son Robert) from the fictional town of Kenzie. The same names appeared in Sputnik Caledonia, but with different storylines. The writer Heinrich Behring figures in Beethoven's Assassins as a disciple of George Gurdjieff, having previously appeared in Mobius Dick and The Great Chain of Unbeing. Beethoven's Assassins also mentions the encyclopedia of Jean-Bernard Rosier, first mentioned in D'Alembert's Principle and Mr Mee. The discussions of music in Beethoven's Assassins echo similar thoughts in Music, in a Foreign Language and The Secret Knowledge. Timothy C. Baker has said of Crumey's novels that they "do not amount to a sequence, nor is the relation between events in them ever straightforwardly causal. Instead, each novel covers similar ground in a series of overlapping folds, while remaining narratively distinct." Crumey has stated, "There is no consistent whole – the 'story of everything' is self-contradictory."
