= Great Chain (disambiguation) =

The Great Chain was one of the Hudson River Chains constructed by Continental Army during the American Revolutionary War.

Great Chain or great chain may also refer to:

- Great Chain Island, situated off the east coast of Oak Bay, British Columbia, Canada
- Great chain of being, a hierarchical structure of all matter and life, thought by medieval Christianity to have been decreed by God
- The Great Chain of Unbeing, a 2018 fiction book by Andrew Crumey
