= Systems novel =

Postmodern literary genre

Systems novel is a literary genre named by Tom LeClair in his 1987 book In the Loop: Don DeLillo and the Systems Novel, and explored further in LeClair's 1989 book, The Art of Excess: Mastery in Contemporary American Fiction. LeClair used systems theory to critique novels by authors including Thomas Pynchon, William Gaddis and Ursula K. Le Guin. Citing Fritjof Capra's description of systems theory as a "new vision of reality", LeClair invoked ideas from thinkers such as James Lovelock, Gregory Bateson and Douglas Hofstadter to analyse how the novels in question depicted processes and relationships within social, cultural, economic and political systems. LeClair's systems novels were all "long, large and dense" and all in some way striving for "mastery", showing similarity to Moby-Dick and Absalom, Absalom! in "range of reference, artistic sophistication, and desire for profound effect."

Subsequent critics widened the geographical range but mostly adhered to the notion that systems novels were typically large and dense, making the concept overlap with other critical terms such as encyclopedic novel and maximalism. This weakened its usefulness as a genre definition, but with the rise of the internet, the systems novel has come to be seen as reflecting the conditions of network culture. The term is now used in at least two different ways, stemming from LeClair's thesis though with different emphases. One highlights bulk, broadness of scope, range of content and greatness of ambition. The other highlights engagement with scientific and technological concepts such as information theory, complexity and emergence. Some systems novels fit both categories, though not all.

== Original examples ==
Having introduced the term in relation to Don DeLillo, Tom LeClair chose seven novels as the focus of The Art of Excess. They were: Gravity's Rainbow (by Thomas Pynchon), Something Happened (by Joseph Heller), J R (by William Gaddis), The Public Burning (by Robert Coover), Women and Men (by Joseph McElroy), LETTERS (by John Barth) and Always Coming Home (by Ursula Le Guin). LeClair wrote, "These seven novels are about mastery, about excesses of power, force, and authority in arenas small and large: the self's mastery of itself, economic and political hegemony, force in history and culture, the transforming power of science and technology, the control of information and art. These novels are also about the size and scale of contemporary experience: how multiplicity and magnitude create new relations and new proportions among persons and entities, how quantity affects quality, how massiveness is related to mastery."

LeClair saw the systems novel as a reaction to the "postmodern collapse of high and modern culture", while at the same time being postmodern itself. "Authoritative in their mastery of contemporary information and postmodern techniques, systems novels admit from within themselves their own limitations – the relativity of categories, the arbitrariness of all models and fictions, the constraints of languages, the limitation of a single metadiscourse, and authorial perspectivism. Widely selected, imaginatively structured, oddly proportioned, and strangely scaled, the plenitude of information in systems novels demands from the reader a systemic understanding, a recognition of the homologies between the systems novels and the ecosystem in which they are published, the world they master."

In 1996 LeClair applied the term to Richard Powers' The Gold Bug Variations, William Vollmann's You Bright and Risen Angels and David Foster Wallace's Infinite Jest. LeClair highlighted all three authors' experience or interest in computing and mathematics. He wrote, "I am not suggesting only that Powers, Vollmann, and Wallace write more explicitly about information than the earlier systems novelists or that their fluency with technical or mathematical languages distinguishes their work. Rather I believe these younger writers more thoroughly conceive their fictions as information systems, as long-running programs of data with a collaborative genesis."

== Post-millennium ==
In 2000 Kirkus Reviews called David Mitchell's Ghostwritten "An inordinately ambitious first novel... a fairly extreme example of the contemporary 'systems novel' (as practiced by Pynchon, DeLillo, McElroy, et al.) obsessed with the interrelationship - not to mention intricacy and opacity - of postindustrial culture's supersophisticated technologies... A richly layered, difficult text that may well be worth the several readings it probably requires.

The Kirkus review expressed an ambivalence amplified in Jonathan Franzen's 2002 essay "Mr. Difficult", recalling his first steps as a fiction writer. "At the excellent public library in Somerville, Massachusetts, I identified a canon of intellectual, socially edgy white-male American fiction writers. The same names - Pynchon, DeLillo, Heller, Coover, Gaddis, Gass, Burroughs, Barth, Barthelme, Hannah, Hawkes, McElroy, and Elkin - kept showing up together in anthologies and in the respectful appraisals of contemporary critics... My problem was that, with a few exceptions, notably Don DeLillo, I didn't particularly like the writers in my modern canon. I checked out their books (including The Recognitions), read a few pages, and returned them. I liked the idea of socially engaged fiction, I was at work on my own Systems novel of conspiracy and apocalypse, and I craved academic and hipster respect of the kind that Pynchon and Gaddis got and Saul Bellow and Ann Beattie didn't. But Bellow and Beattie, not to mention Dickens and Conrad and Bronte and Dostoyevsky and Christina Stead, were the writers I actually, unhiply enjoyed reading."

John Freeman has suggested that the September 11 attacks marked the end of the systems novel. Writing ten years after the event, he observed that although many American fiction works had reflected on the attacks, "not a single one of these novels - not even DeLillo's Falling Man, which is the best of all 9/11 novels and unfolds on the day - offers a kind of unified field theory of the how and the why, the global heave of what happened... This end of the systems novel is, however, not such a bad thing; it marks a necessary end to a fiction about a kind of fiction... After all, they all presume a world in which the US is the centre; all of them narrate a tale in which whiteness is the neutral value."

Against this view was Tom McCarthy's reaction in 2011 to the posthumous publication of David Foster Wallace's unfinished and fragmentary The Pale King. McCarthy found the "networked, systems-novel structure of the book... exhilarating and brilliantly realized" and wrote that Foster's book could be seen in two ways: "as a coherent, if incomplete, portrayal of our age unfolding on an epic scale" or "a much rawer and more fragmented reflection on the act of writing itself... in an age of data saturation."

== Further development ==
In 2014 Stefano Ercolino replaced "systems novel" with a new term. In The Maximalist Novel: From Thomas Pynchon's Gravity's Rainbow to Roberto Bolano's 2666, Ercolino described "an aesthetically hybrid genre of the contemporary novel that develops in the second half of the twentieth century in the United States, then 'emigrates' to Europe and Latin America at the threshold the twenty-first.". Like LeClair, Ercolino singled out seven novels for particular attention: Gravity's Rainbow, Infinite Jest, Underworld, White Teeth, The Corrections, 2666, and 2005 dopo Cristo by Babette Factory. Unlike LeClair, Ercolino did not see "mastery" as a defining feature. According to Ercolino, "it would make more sense to speak of an ambiguous relationship between maximalist narrative forms and power."

LeClair's original notion was nevertheless embraced and extended by Damien Walter, who linked it to science fiction in a 2016 Guardian article. "At their best, when systems novels veer right into science fiction, they can hold infinity itself in their purview - and none come closer to that than Kim Stanley Robinson... There are more contemporary science fiction authors using this model, too: Madeline Ashby, Ramez Naam and Monica Byrne all use science fiction as an arena for speculative, intellectual debate."

Tracy O'Neill responded to her 2020 novel Quotients being described as a systems novel, saying:

"If the systems novel has traditionally been associated with stories told by white men, perhaps it’s because too often it’s been assumed that books by women of color centering on racialized pain, especially in the private sphere, are the sum of what women of color are capable of—when of course we have more stories to tell—rather than an inherent incompatibility between the systems novel and the requirements of representing life at the margins. I see the problem as less about this story form than a view in which our primary recommendation is construed as 'authenticity.'"

Other books continued to be described and praised as systems novels, e.g. Sergio de la Pava's A Naked Singularity and Hari Kunzru's Gods Without Men. Dario Diofebi's Paradise Nevada was favourably described by the Washington Post in 2021 as "a throwback to the sprawling 1990s systems novel on both a conceptual level and a sentence-for-sentence basis". In Esquire, a positive review of Adam Levin's Mount Chicago conflated LeClair's and Ercolino's categories, focusing on bulk: "The maximalist novel — also referred to as the 'systems novel' or the 'Mega-Novel' — towers, it looms, it stands upright on the bookshelf and intimidates readers, daring them to endeavor, to understand, to finish... Once, the publication of a maximalist novel drew much publicity and attention, but now the market teems with them."

There has also been continuing suspicion of the genre. In a 2022 GQ article, "Is the ‘systems novel’ the future of fiction?", Sam Leith compared Tom McCarthy's The Making of Incarnation with Dave Eggers' The Every. Leith wrote, "Where Eggers, though, is writing a more or less traditional novel (inner lives; rich characterisation; decipherable motivation), McCarthy is doing something stranger and more ambitious. His characters are short on inner life: their place in the systems that surround them are what McCarthy is about. And as a book it is hugely interesting, energetic, wise and well written – but you struggle as a reader, a little, to engage with something that seems more interested in rendering speeds and the physics of scattering light than in the people so rendered and on whom that light falls. The question ultimately posed, or pointed to, by systems novels is: can novels do without people? And the answer I would give is: not completely. The problem is, perhaps, that the part of our minds that responds to old-fashioned novels hasn’t changed as fast as the world around it."

While the term persists in literary journalism, it has "lost traction" in academic criticism, according to a 2021 journal article by Toon Staes. Like Ercolino, Staes criticised LeClair's "loose conceptualisation", saying that in The Art of Excess LeClair had "mainly used the systems paradigm as a source of plot and metaphor in his discussion." But instead of replacing the term, as Ercolino did, with a new conceptual framework applicable to a similar collection of novels, Staes suggested an "update" for the systems novel that would restore its original connection to systems theory and the related field of complexity theory. This would still embrace LeClair's examples, but could also include novels that were quite different in scale, tone or content. In Staes' new definition, "systems novels feature multiple nonlinear and fragmented narrative strands that gradually fix the reader’s attention on a network of relationships; they braid together different perspectives and narrative voices, none of which is more important than the others; they often feature a large cast of characters; and they display what I would call 'distributed causality', moving from lower-level narrative events to higher-level patterns. As systems novels progress, alternating between parallel plots and disparate storylines, they prompt readers to shift their focus from the particular and the local to the general and the global, in order to perceive the emerging patterns that unfold." As an example of this redefined systems novel, Staes suggested Pfitz – a comic novel set in the 18th century, imbued with self-reflexivity and allusions to emergence. Staes wrote, "Pfitz makes for an interesting test case, not least because its author, Andrew Crumey, studied nonlinear dynamics... It also makes for an idiosyncratic systems novel, since, at a mere 164 pages, its length falls well short of the baggy monsters in LeClair’s corpus."

== See also ==
- Encyclopedic novel
- Ergodic literature
