= The Morning News (online magazine) =

U.S.-based daily online magazine

- Website type: Online magazine
- Available in: English
- Owner: The Morning News LLC
- Creators: Rosecrans Baldwin and Andrew Womack
- Website: www.themorningnews.org
- Commercial: Yes
- Launched: 1999; 27 years ago

The Morning News is a U.S.-based daily online magazine founded in 1999 by Rosecrans Baldwin and Andrew Womack. It began as an email newsletter and in the fall of 2000 evolved into a news-oriented weblog with a New York focus. In October 2002, Baldwin and Womack launched The Morning News as a daily-published online magazine.

The Morning News publishes short pieces of humor, commentary, and personal essays. Other featured sections include Headlines, a twice-daily column of links to interesting, relevant, and obscure news stories and websites; Galleries, which highlights the work of contemporary artists and authors; and the Non-Expert, a satirical advice column. TMN also features a variety of themed blogs, including an interview series called TMN Talks and a book blog, Our Man in Boston, by Robert Birnbaum.

Time listed the magazine in the 2006 edition of its "50 Coolest Websites" and the Utne Reader called the site "more nourishing than the newsprint diet that has previously dominated your breakfast."

== Books ==
The Morning News content has inspired the publication of several books.

=== Gary Benchley, Rock Star ===
In September 2003, The Morning News published the first of 27 installments of a serial titled Gary Benchley, Rock Star, written from the perspective of "a Williamsburg wannabe-indie-rocker" named Gary Benchley.

When the collected Gary Benchley series was published by Plume in September 2005, it was revealed that Gary Benchley was really TMN contributor and Harper's Magazine webmaster Paul Ford. However, many were fooled by Ford's charade, including the New York Times, which called his book "a sort of Dickens-esque flourish for the digital age."

On the day of the novel's publication, The Morning News published an essay by Ford explaining the story of Gary Benchley, from inspiration to publication.

=== Four Seasons in Rome: On Twins, Insomnia, and the Biggest Funeral in the History of the World ===
Between February and August 2005, The Morning News published five essays by Anthony Doerr, who was living in Rome for a year after winning the Rome Prize from the American Academy of Arts and Letters. Doerr's essays addressed his and his wife's challenges living abroad with their infant sons; his many perspectives on Rome; and the funeral of Pope John Paul II. In June 2007, Doerr published a book, Four Seasons in Rome: On Twins, Insomnia, and the Biggest Funeral in the History of the World, based on the Letters From Rome series.

=== The Morning News Annual ===
In 2008, The Morning News began publishing a yearly book of new content and selected online material called The Morning News Annual.

=== Paris, I Love You But You're Bringing Me Down ===
While living and working in Paris, The Morning News co-founder Rosecrans Baldwin wrote a series of letters for the magazine that later inspired a travel memoir. Paris, I Love You But You're Bringing Me Down was published by Farrar, Straus and Giroux in May 2012.

== Events ==
=== The Tournament of Books ===
In 2005, The Morning News launched the Tournament of Books, an annual literary contest structured like and coinciding with the NCAA basketball tournament. The Tournament culminates in the Rooster prize—named in honor of writer David Sedaris's brother in the short story "You Can't Kill the Rooster." The inspiration for the Tournament of Books came from the idea that while "arbitrariness is inherent in book awards," the Rooster could at least be transparent.

Sixteen books published in the previous year are chosen and matched against each other, with a different judge for each match. Judges read their two assigned books and select one to advance to the next round in written decisions that are published daily on the site. Past judges include Elliot Ackerman, Monica Ali, Nicole Cliffe, Helen DeWitt, Junot Díaz, Sasha Frere-Jones, Amanda Hesser, John Hodgman, Nick Hornby, Karl Iagnemma, Tayari Jones, Sam Lipsyte, Colin Meloy, Celeste Ng, Dale Peck, David Rees, Mary Roach, Gary Shteyngart, Jeff VanderMeer, and Meg Wolitzer.

During the 2009 event, Baldwin and Womack were interviewed on NPR's All Things Considered. In the interview, Baldwin described Tournament contenders as: "books that have received a lot of hype… books that we've had recommended to us by readers, by friends, by family; books that have won awards, books that maybe got unrecognized or are coming from the independent publishing world."

In 2014, the tournament celebrated its 10th edition and featured notable judges such as John Green, Roxane Gay, John Darnielle, and Roger Hodge.

The Tournament has two rounds, followed by semifinals, followed by a "Zombie Round" in which the two most popular books that were eliminated in earlier as determined by fan voting are re-matched against the two winners of the semifinals. In the final round, all the Tournament's judges vote for the winner. Throughout the Tournament, authors Kevin Guilfoile and John Warner provide commentary on each decision.

Past Rooster Winners in the Tournament of Books:

- 2005: Cloud Atlas by David Mitchell
- 2006: The Accidental by Ali Smith
- 2007: The Road by Cormac McCarthy
- 2008: The Brief Wondrous Life of Oscar Wao by Junot Díaz
- 2009: A Mercy by Toni Morrison
- 2010: Wolf Hall by Hilary Mantel
- 2011: A Visit From the Goon Squad by Jennifer Egan
- 2012: The Sisters Brothers by Patrick deWitt
- 2013: The Orphan Master's Son by Adam Johnson
- 2014: The Good Lord Bird by James McBride
- 2015: Station Eleven by Emily St. John Mandel
- 2016: The Sellout by Paul Beatty
- 2017: The Underground Railroad by Colson Whitehead
- 2018: Fever Dream by Samanta Schweblin
- 2019: My Sister, the Serial Killer by Oyinkan Braithwaite
- 2020: Normal People by Sally Rooney
- 2021: Interior Chinatown by Charles Yu
- 2022: Klara and the Sun by Kazuo Ishiguro
- 2023: The Book of Goose by Yiyun Li
- 2024: Blackouts by Justin Torres
- 2025: James by Percival Everett
- 2026: Flesh by David Szalay

In 2020, a Super Rooster tournament was held, with the field comprising the winners of the first 16 years of the tournament. This tournament was won by A Mercy by Toni Morrison.

=== Sloppy Seconds With Opal Mehta ===
In light of the plagiarism controversy that surrounded novice author Kaavya Viswanathan's debut novel How Opal Mehta Got Kissed, Got Wild, and Got a Life, in 2006 The Morning News developed a contest to find a writer who could formulate a "coherent and original piece of fiction completely made from the works of others." Contestants were prompted to plagiarize from at least five works of others and were warned that no single-word lifting was allowed — only direct plagiarism of passages and sentences.

Out of 54 entrants, Bonnie Furlong was chosen the winner of the contest for her story The Parlourmaid's Tale, or, MS in a Dustbin, which, according to Gawker.com, "served Kaavya her weak ass on a plate."

=== Infinite Summer ===
Starting in June 2009, The Morning News sponsored Infinite Summer, a summer-long reading expedition of David Foster Wallace's Infinite Jest. The freeform read-along is guided via blog by Morning News contributing writer Matthew Baldwin; participants are urged to read about 75 pages per week and discuss their progress in online forums. The goal of the event, as Womack stated in an interview with the Associated Press, is to put the book "back in the hands of real readers: thousands of them, in fact, on the same page at the same time."
