= Dalembert =

Dalembert is a surname. Notable people with the surname include:

- Jean Baptiste dAlembert (1717–1783), French mathematician, mechanician, physicist, philosopher, and music theorist
- Louis-Philippe Dalembert (born 1962), Haitian writer
- Samuel Dalembert (born 1981), Haitian-Canadian basketball player

== See also ==
- d'Alembert (disambiguation)
