= D'Alembert's Principle (novel) =

1996 novel by Andrew Crumey

- First edition
- Author: Andrew Crumey
- Cover artist: Lise Weisgerber
- Language: English
- Genre: Literary Fiction
- Published: 06.06.1996
- Publisher: Dedalus Books
- Publication place: United Kingdom
- Media type: Paperback, e-book
- ISBN: 978 1 873982 32 7

D'Alembert's Principle (Dedalus Books, 1996) is a novel by Andrew Crumey, and the second in a sequence of three set wholly or partly in the eighteenth century (the others being Pfitz and Mr Mee). It is in three sections, subtitled "Memory, Reason and Imagination". The U.S. edition was subtitled "A novel in three panels". It has been translated into French, German, Dutch, Spanish, Greek, Russian, Italian, Turkish and Romanian. It prompted El Mundo (Spain) to say "Crumey is one of the most interesting and original European authors of recent years."

The first section, recursively titled "D'Alembert's Principle", is a historical fiction depicting Jean le Rond D'Alembert, featuring his unrequited love for Julie de l'Espinasse, and describing the principle of physics named after him. The second section, "The Cosmography of Magnus Ferguson" is a speculative fiction about interplanetary travel by an eighteenth-century Scotsman. The third section, "Tales from Rreinnstadt", is a Menippean satire featuring the setting and title character from Pfitz.

== Themes ==
Stefania Cassar has contextualised D'Alembert's Principle as one of a number of British novels from the 1980s and 90s that portrayed science and scientists in the light of ongoing cultural debates. "D'Alembert's Principle, Mendel's Dwarf and Three Times Table... illustrate how some of our most basic ideas about 'science', 'nature' and 'literature' are historically constituted, and explore how these underlying cultural assumptions can inform and/or influence even the most apparently 'objective' and 'factual' scientific inquiries. Xorandor, ThreeTimesTable, and D'Alembert's Principle are set in societies where powerful elements and/or influential figures attempt to reinforce and police the boundaries between science and the humanities, between reason and the imagination. All three novels insist that such attempts to carve out definite boundaries are misguided, limiting and ultimately doomed to failure... criticism of science from the perspective of the humanities can expose the limitations of the assumptions that under lie the two-cultures model and bring to light fresh ways of perceiving the literature-science relation."

An unnamed character at the end of the first section of D'Alembert's Principle proposes a probabilistic theory of physics different from D'Alembert's deterministic one. This character reappears in Mr Mee as Jean-Bernard Rosier. The Rosier Corporation is important in Mobius Dick, and the Rosier Foundation is mentioned in The Great Chain of Unbeing. Like the three parts of D'Alembert's Principle, the novels themselves are loosely connected and readable in any order. T. C. Baker calls this structure "monadological", observing that "five of [Crumey's] seven novels explore, in various ways, the legacies of Enlightenment thought, often drawing upon the same ideas and figures. These novels, crucially, do not amount to a sequence, nor is the relation between events in them ever straightforwardly causal. Instead, each novel covers similar ground in a series of overlapping folds, while remaining narratively distinct."

== Reception ==
Merle Rubin wrote in The Wall Street Journal, "Writing in the inventive, playful tradition of Calvino and Borges, Mr. Crumey blends history, fantasy, fable and metaphysical speculation in a confection that is at once elegant, provocative and thoroughly entertaining."

Lucy Atkins in The Guardian called it "The literary equivalent of an Escher" with "no identifiable end or beginning."

Kirkus Reviews said, "Once the reader's head stops spinning from trying to follow the intricate mechanics of the tale here, there is much to be enjoyed and admired. Still, Crumey's effort doesn't measure up to its less fragmentary predecessors."

Erica Wagner wrote in The Times: "The three sections are loosely linked; they seem to orbit each other like bodies in space, their paths never crossing but never separate, either. Crumey's writing has a fastidiousness and dry humour apposite to his 18th-century setting, and a dreamlike structure reminiscent of Paul Auster's New York Trilogy. This clever, deceptive novel sets out to prove that rationalism is an emperor without any clothes and succeeds by doing what all fine writing should: reawakening in the reader a sense of the deep mysteriousness of life."

Ray Olson wrote in Booklist, "Proceeding from poignancy to awe to hilarity, the three parts constitute an intellectual treat that admirers of Borges and philosophical sf master Stanislaw Lem, in particular, should appreciate."

Carolyn See wrote in The Washington Post, "This is a postmodern novel. More specifically, it's made up of a novella, a doodad in the form of an account of interplanetary travel, and a third narrative that, if it weren't already labeled as postmodern, could best be described as a shaggy dog story."

Sybil Steinberg wrote in Publishers Weekly, "The loopy dialogue between Pfitz and Goldman is reminiscent of the Tortoise and Achilles sections in Douglas Hofstadter's Gödel, Escher, Bach. Crumey is described as a postmodernist, but he isn't anything so terrifying: he's simply reviving that old Enlightenment pastime, the philosophical jeu d'esprit."

Tobias Jones wrote in The Observer: "Deliberate confusion and incoherence are the ingredients of Crumey's third novel. D'Alembert believes he has found a 'mathematical formula by which all the contradictory affairs of men' are 'reduced to a single principle'. It is a historical triptych, travelling between different characters, narratives, and even planets; but as it moves from Memory to Reason and then Imagination, the theory breaks down into chaos."

Tom Deveson wrote in The Sunday Times, "This is a highly polished fable, which sustains its learning with wit and zestful confidence."

Alice Thompson wrote in The Scotsman: "This makes for a disjointed but challenging read, for Crumey is experimenting with various forms of fiction: the fiction of history and science, of philosophy and of the imagination. D'Alembert's fictional memoirs are an expertly structured, moving account... "The Cosmography of Magnus Ferguson", in contrast, is a kind of Swiftean satire of various branches of philosophical thought... In his final section, Crumey uses the sensuality of the empirical world. His language becomes more richly descriptive... Like Crumey's giant astronomical clock, marking time of the universe, his ambitious novel works. It doesn't stop ticking."

Boyd Tonkin wrote in New Statesman, "Growing lighter as it builds, the whole book adds up to a scorching critique of pure Reason. A shame, then, that Crumey gets lost sometimes in the dry abstractions of Enlightened prose."

Susan Salter Reynolds wrote in the Los Angeles Times, "a principle, a vision and a story combine to create a portrait of the 18th-century European mind stretched thin between the heart and the stars."

Ann Irvin wrote in Library Journal, "D'Alembert's Principle is actually three stories, including the title story, "The Cosmography of Magnus Ferguson," and "Tales from Rreinstadt." Each represents an aspect of D'Alembert's definition of knowledge: memory, reason, and imagination. The stories are set in the 18th century, when D'Alembert worked with Diderot on his famous dictionary. The first story uses D'Alembert's memories to illustrate his great success with mathematical theories but his failure in love. The second story, representing reason, is an exploration of empiricism. "Tales from Rreinstadt" is narrated by Pfitz, the beggar who also appeared in Crumey's earlier novel, Pfitz, while Pfitz is temporarily imprisoned by a wealthy jeweler. Crumey, a Scotsman, has cleverly interwoven aspects of human thought with entertaining stories. The details and tone of the stories aptly convey the tenor of 18th-century rationalism. For academic and public libraries where intellectual fiction is enjoyed."

El País (Spain) called it "Ingenious and brilliant".
