= Mr Mee =

Novel by Andrew Crumey

- Second edition (Dedalus 2014)
- Author: Andrew Crumey
- Cover artist: Marie Lane (2nd ed.)
- Language: English
- Genre: Literary Fiction
- Published: 2000 (first edition)
- Publisher: Picador (1st ed.)
- Publication place: United Kingdom
- Media type: Paperback, e-book
- ISBN: 978 1 909232 94 5

Mr Mee (Picador, 2000; Dedalus Books, 2014) is a novel by Andrew Crumey, his third set wholly or partly in the eighteenth century (following Pfitz and D'Alembert's Principle). It has three alternating story-lines: one featuring a pair of 18th-century French copyists, and two with modern protagonists - elderly Scottish book collector Mr Mee and university lecturer Dr Petrie. The lecturer's strand is serious in tone. Dissatisfied with his marriage and suffering ill health, he muses on French literature and becomes infatuated with a student. The other two strands are comic. The copyists become guardians of an esoteric encyclopaedia, and Mr Mee wishes to find it. He turns to the World Wide Web (still fairly new at the time of the novel) and discovers pornography and drugs, with farcical consequences.

The copyists, Ferrand and Minard, are based on two men mentioned briefly in Rousseau's Confessions. Their fictional versions – described by one critic as "something of an eighteenth-century Abbott and Costello" – resemble the title characters in Flaubert's Bouvard and Pecuchet. The lecturer Dr Petrie thinks Ferrand and Minard never existed, comparing Rousseau's Confessions to Proust's In Search of Lost Time - something that appears to be a memoir but is really a novel.

The copyists' encyclopaedia is the work of Jean-Bernard Rosier, a character from D'Alembert's Principle. The name recurs in subsequent Crumey novels: The Rosier Corporation in Mobius Dick, the Rosier Foundation in The Great Chain of Unbeing.

The first chapter of the novel includes a version of the Monty Hall problem, presented as a letter from Rosier to D'Alembert about a hostage whose life depends upon choosing which cup a ring is hidden under. Chapter 8 has a version of the unexpected hanging paradox and also alludes to the uncertainty principle and measurement problem.

The name Mr Mee may be a pun on "me", reflecting the novel's concern with truth and authorship in first-person writers such as Rousseau and Proust. It might also hint at encyclopaedist Arthur Mee, or the novel's year of publication, MM in Roman numerals. The title was changed by some foreign publishers: the Italian translation was titled Il professore, Rousseau e l'arte dell'adulterio; the German edition was Rousseau und die geilen Pelztierchen.

== Reception ==
Booker Prize judge Roy Foster wrote in the Financial Times: "We ended with a shortlist to be proud of, and a magnificent winner in Margaret Atwood's The Blind Assassin, but I still think regretfully of a few that got away (some only just)... Andrew Crumey's Mr Mee is wildly expansive and generally light-hearted: it weaves together the story of an octogenarian Scottish scholar discovering sex through the internet, with an 18th-century French whodunnit about a lost philosophe encyclopaedia and a dying academic's obsession with one of his students. The French element is a triumph in itself, but each story is reported in a perfectly manipulated voice, the deadpan humour never wavers, the cross-references thicken intriguingly, and in the end all the tangled threads resolve into a beautifully executed pattern which is oddly moving.

Miranda Seymour wrote in the New Statesman: "Andrew Crumey is one of the most original novelists around. I wish that Mr Mee, in which he mixes together murder, fairy tales, Rousseau, pornographers and the internet to dazzling effect, had made it on to the Booker list. It deserved a place there.

Reviewing Mr Mee in The Washington Post, Andrew Ervin noted the similarity between a line near the start of the novel and the opening of Borges' story "Tlön, Uqbar, Orbis Tertius": "I owe the discovery of Uqbar to the conjunction of an encyclopaedia and a mirror". Crumey's character says, "I owe my discovery of the Xanthics (and hence of Rosier’s Encyclopaedia) to the coincidence of a flat tyre and a shower of rain." Ervin wrote: "Borges lurks in the shadows of Mr Mee, and he becomes the reader's Virgil, an essential guide through an abyss of literary references, allusions and constructs. Although his name remains unuttered through the vast majority of the book, other historical figures do turn up as characters, minor plot functionaries and tongue-in-cheek jokes on the part of the author. Rousseau plays a sizable role in the goings-on, and Diderot turns up to tremendous comic effect. The works of Kafka, Kant and especially Proust, among many others, line up for inspection before it's over... It's the rare novel that makes you want to begin anew as soon as you've finished the last page."

In Scotland on Sunday, Ruth Thomas wrote: "My own sympathies lay with the dying lecturer, whose story is the least contrived of the three, and whose character the least like a caricature. His infatuation with his student, although rather sickening and Humbert Humbert-like, also reveals a real sadness and emptiness at the core of his life, and this is poignantly and delicately written. Similarly, Mr Mee's incompatibility with the 20th century, let alone the 21st, is at times a very moving portrayal of the way old people's needs are overlooked by society. In common with the others, Mr Mee has a strong voice, full of enthusiasm and passion for life - or at least, his interpretation of it. And this is ultimately how the whole novel comes across - an odd story, occasionally a little hard to stomach, but told with such energy and conviction that you can't help admiring it."

Hilary Mantel wrote in the New York Times: " In a novel so cerebral as Mr. Mee, it would not be surprising if the characters were paper-thin and the jokes a species of facetious quibbling. But Crumey is a sensitive writer, and he creates an unexpected amount of sympathy for both the wistful Dr. Petrie and the awesomely naive Mr. Mee. He has a sharp wit and taps the sort of deep, rich vein of comedy accessible only to authors who respect their own characters... Fans of Tom Stoppard and Michael Frayn will relish this novel's puzzles and paradoxes, its unfolding and ingenious designs. Yet it is never hard going, always good-humored, jaunty and sometimes enjoyably silly. Crumey is a confident narrator, and his book has a heart as well as a brain. It is not only an intellectual treat but a moving meditation on aspiration and desire."

In 2003 Hilary Mantel was a judge of Granta's "20 best British writers under 40", along with Ian Jack, Robert McCrum, Nicholas Clee and Alex Clark. Crumey was selected on the strength of Mr Mee, but on being told, immediately pointed out that although the book was published before his 39th birthday, he was now over 40, hence ineligible. Two other writers were then found to be ineligible as well, and all three had to be replaced on the list. Ian Jack later wrote, "That meant the published list included three names we'd previously ruled out - three writers who, after a little flurry of phone calls between the judges, moved up in our ranking from "Quite Good" to "Best". There can be no more telling illustration of the arbitrariness of literary lists. I write this as a comfort to those who fail to get on them, and a caution to those who do."

== Critical analysis ==
Timothy C. Baker commented on the use of Gothic tropes such as found manuscripts in the work of Crumey and other Scottish writers. "Use of such tropes can be limiting... In other texts, however, including Gray's Poor Things, Crumey's Mr Mee, and A. L. Kennedy's So I Am Glad, each of which embeds Gothic elements in another genre or mode, the trope exceeds these limitations and allows for a greater reflection on the relationship between language and experience."
