= Infinite Summer =

Online project and challenge to read the novel "Infinite Jest" (summer 2009)

Infinite Summer was an online book club–style project started by writer Matthew Baldwin. Sponsored by The Morning News, participants were challenged to read David Foster Wallace's novel Infinite Jest at a rate of about 75 pages a week from June 21 to September 22, 2009.

== Direction ==
Baldwin and three other writers acted as "guides", providing commentary on the Infinite Summer website. Participants contributed commentary over a variety of social networking services, including Facebook, Tumblr, and Twitter, where related posts were marked with the hashtag #infsum. Baldwin said in interviews that the project was prompted in part by Wallace's death in September 2008.

Participants included Colin Meloy of The Decemberists, Ezra Klein of The Washington Post, and John Krasinski, who was about to release his film adaptation of Wallace's Brief Interviews with Hideous Men. Though he did not participate, John Hodgman called the project "a noble and crazy enterprise".

== Subreddit ==
In 2014, the subreddit /r/InfiniteSummer began conducting annual readings, suggesting a pace of 10 pages per day. Discussions occur both on Reddit as well as within a private discord server.
