= Always Coming Home =

1985 novel by Ursula K. Le Guin

- First edition cover
- Author: Ursula K. Le Guin
- Illustrator: Margaret Chodos
- Language: English
- Genre: Science fiction
- Published: 1985 (Harper and Row)
- Publication place: United States
- Media type: Print (hardcover and paperback)
- Pages: 523
- ISBN: 0-06-015545-0
- OCLC: 11728313
- Dewey Decimal: 813/.54 19
- LC Class: PS3562.E42 A79 1985

Submerged California, the setting of the book. The Old Straight Road is the SR 29, the Grandmother Mountain (Ama Kulkun) is Mount Saint Helena.

Heyiya-if, a holy symbol for the Kesh.

The Kesh aiha alphabet

Always Coming Home is a 1985 science fiction novel by American writer Ursula K. Le Guin. It is in parts narrative, pseudo-textbook and pseudo-anthropologist's record. It describes the life and society of the Kesh people, a cultural group who live in the distant future long after modern society has collapsed. It is presented by Pandora, who seems to be an anthropologist or ethnographer from the readers' contemporary culture, or a culture very close to it. Pandora describes the book as a protest against contemporary civilization, which the Kesh call "the Sickness of Man".

== Setting ==
The book's setting is a time so post-apocalyptic that no cultural source can remember the apocalypse, though a few folk tales refer to our time. The only signs of our civilization that have lasted into their time are indestructible artefacts such as styrofoam and a self-manufacturing, self-maintaining, solar-system-wide computer network. There has been a great sea level rise since our time, flooding much of northern California, where the story takes place.

The Kesh use technological inventions of civilization such as writing, steel, guns, electricity, trains, and a computer network (see below). However, unlike one of their neighboring societies – the Dayao or Condor People – they do nothing on an industrial scale, reject governance, have no non-laboring caste, do not expand their population or territory, consider disbelief in what we consider “supernatural” absurd, and deplore human domination of the natural environment. Their culture blends millennia of human economic culture by combining aspects of hunter-gatherer, agricultural, and industrial societies, but rejects cities (literal “civilization”). In fact, what they call “towns” would count as villages for the reader – a dozen or a few-dozen multi-family or large family homes. What they call “war” is a minor skirmish over hunting territories, and is considered a ridiculous pastime for youngsters, since an adult person should not throw his life away.

Pandora observes that a key difference between the Kesh and the readers' [her?] society is the size of their population: "There are not too many of them.". Their low population density means that they can feed themselves from their land. The Kesh maintain this low population without coercion, which would be antithetical to their loosely organized society. They carry a large accumulation of genetic damage, which leads to fewer successful pregnancies and higher infant mortality. They also have social taboos against multiple siblings and early pregnancies; a third child is considered shameful, and the Dayao's practice of large families is referred to as "incontinence". Abortions are practiced freely.

== Summary ==
The book is divided into two parts: The first part consists mostly of Kesh texts and records of oral performances, interspersed with Pandora's commentary, accounts of a few aspects of Kesh life, and personal essays. The longest text is a personal history narrated by a woman called Stone Telling. Stone Telling's autobiography fills less than a third of the book, told in three sections with large gaps filled with other material. The second part, called "The Back of the Book", contains a few Kesh texts but consists mostly of Pandora's accounts of various aspects of Kesh life.

Stone Telling recounts how she spent her childhood with her mother's people in the Valley, as a very young woman lived several years with her father's people in The City, and escaped from it with her daughter, who was born there. The two societies are contrasted through her narrative: the Kesh are peaceable and self-organized, whereas the Condor people of The City are rigid, patriarchal, hierarchical, militaristic, and expansionist. During the lifetime of Stone Telling, both The City and the Valley change, and for a time one changes the other. There are traces of this arc in other parts of the book.

The next longest piece in the main part, in the section "Eight Life Stories", is the novelette "The Visionary", which was published as a stand-alone story in Omni in 1984. This part also includes history and legends, myths, plays, a chapter of a novel, and song lyrics and poetry. (Note: Le Guin also separately published a Kesh-like spiritual poem "Totem", relating to the Mole Society (a cult), in her poetry collection Hard Words.) Some editions of the book were accompanied by a tape of Kesh music and poetry.

A number of these are attributed by Pandora to a Kesh woman named Little Bear Woman; (Note: The name Intrumo [ɪntrʌmɔ] "Little Bear Woman" is an exact equivalent of Ursula, which is Latin for "little she-bear": ursa "a she-bear" + -ula fem. form of -ulus "diminutive"; in Kesh the analysis is in- "little", trum "bear", -o "female".) these are:

- Shahugoten. As told by Little Bear Woman of Sinshan to the Editor pp. 57–59 [a legend]
- Coming Home to Up the Hill House. By Little Bear Woman p. 258 [a poem]
- The Writer to the Morning in Up the Hill House in Sinshan. By Little Bear Woman p. 258 [a poem]
- A Song to Up the Hill House in Sinshan. By Little Bear Woman p. 259 [a poem]
- Some of the paths around Sinshan Creek. A Kesh map of the watershed of Sinshan Creek, given to the Editor by Little Bear Woman of Sinshan.

"The Back of the Book", about a fifth of the number of pages, presents cultural lore, with the format and attributions or annotations that an ethnographic fieldworker might make. It includes discussions of village layout and landscaping, family and professional guilds, recipes, medical care, yearly ritual dances, and language.

== Analysis ==
In Ursula K. Le Guin: A Critical Companion, Bernardo and Murphy note that Always Coming Home underscores Le Guin's long-standing anthropological interests. The Valley of the Na [River] is modeled on the landscape of California's Napa Valley, where Le Guin spent her childhood when her family was not in Berkeley.

Like much of Le Guin's work, Always Coming Home follows Native American themes. According to Richard Erlich, "Always Coming Home is a fictional retelling of much in A. L. Kroeber's [Ursula's father] monumental Handbook of the Indians of California." There are also some elements retrieved from her mother's The Inland Whale (Traditional narratives of Native California), such as the importance of the number nine, and the map of the Na Valley which looks like the Ancient Yurok World. There are also Taoist themes: the heyiya-if looks like the taijitu, and its hollow center (the "hinge") is like the hub of the wheel as described in the Tao Te Ching. Le Guin had described herself "as an unconsistent Taoist and a consistent un-Christian".

Tom LeClair identifies the book as a systems novel.

== Reception ==
One of its earliest reviews, by Samuel R. Delany in The New York Times, called it "a slow, rich read... [Le Guin's] most satisfying text among a set of texts that have provided much imaginative pleasure"

Dave Langford reviewed Always Coming Home for White Dwarf #82, and stated that "Among many rich strangenesses it also includes a critique of its own improbabilities (as seen through twentieth-century eyes)."

John Scalzi, one-time president of the Science Fiction and Fantasy Writers of America, wrote, in his introduction to the 2016 edition, that he discovered the book as a teenager, and calls it "a formative book...sunk deep in [his] bones", one to endlessly return to, always coming home.

The novel received the Janet Heidinger Kafka Prize and was a finalist for the National Book Award for Fiction.

== Stage adaptations ==
A stage version of Always Coming Home was mounted at Naropa University in 1993 (with Le Guin's approval) by Ruth Davis-Fyer. Music for the production was composed and directed by Brian Mac Ian, although it was original music and not directly influenced by Todd Barton's work.

In 2019 the book was adapted for the stage by polish director Magda Szpecht at TR Warszawa in coproduction with Festival/Tokyo. The multinational cast consisted of an ensemble of actors and contemporary dancers and was performed to original music written by composer Krzysztof Kaliski.

In December 2025, a German-language stage adaptation premiered at Theater & Orchester Heidelberg. The performance was directed by the directing duo F. Wiesel with original music by Jacob Bussmann. The production involved Augmented-Reality technology into the stage performances to convey the archeological venture.

== Publication history ==
- Original hardcover release (boxed, with audiocassette), 1985 ISBN 0-06-015545-0
- Original paperback (boxed, with audiocassette), 1985 ISBN 0-06-015456-X
- Mass-market Bantam Spectra paperback, 1986 ISBN 0-553-26280-7
- Trade paperback from the University of California Press, February 2001. Paperback, 534 pages. ISBN 9780520227354 (as part of a series of literature pieces set in California) - the book had been out of print for many years when this was released.
- Library of America hardcover edition, 2019, 800 pages. ISBN 9781598536034 Features new excerpts from the Kesh novel Dangerous People and other new material.
- Harper Perennial paperback, 2023 ISBN 0358726921

=== Box set and soundtrack ===
A box set edition of the book (ISBN 0-06-015456-X), comes with an audiocassette entitled Music and Poetry of the Kesh, featuring 10 musical pieces and 3 poetry performances by Todd Barton. The book contains 100 original illustrations by Margaret Chodos. As of 2017, the soundtrack can be purchased separately in MP3 format (ISBN 978-1-61138-209-9). A vinyl record was also released, together with a digital album for streaming and download in several formats. That combination sold out, but the digital album by itself remains available, and a second pressing of the vinyl, plus the digital, was scheduled to ship "on or around 25 May 2018".

== Sources ==
- Bernardo, Susan M.; Murphy, Graham J. (2006). Ursula K. Le Guin: A Critical Companion (1st ed.). Westport, CT: Greenwood Press. ISBN 0-313-33225-8.
- Cadden, Mike (2005). Ursula K. Le Guin Beyond Genre: Fiction for Children and Adults (1st ed.). New York, NY: Routledge. ISBN 0-415-99527-2.
