= Tracy O'Neill =

American novelist

- Education: Connecticut College (BA); City College of New York (MFA); Columbia University (MA, MPhil, PhD)
- Occupations: Writer, professor
- Writing career
- Genres: fiction, nonfiction, criticism
- Notable awards: 5 Under 35 Honoree (2015)
- Website: www.tracyoneill.net

Tracy O'Neill is an American author and essayist. She is the author of three books, which include her memoir, Woman of Interest, and two novels, The Hopeful and Quotients. She has also published numerous short stories, essays, and criticism. She was named a 2015 "5 Under 35" Honoree by the National Book Foundation.

== Early life and education ==
O'Neill was born in South Korea. She was adopted by an Irish Catholic American family in the early 1980s and raised in New England. O'Neill has a BA from Connecticut College and an MFA from the City College of New York, as well as an MA, MPhil, and PhD from Columbia University.

== Career ==
Her writing has appeared in Granta, The New York Times, Rolling Stone, BOMB magazine, The Atlantic, McSweeney's, The New Yorker, Bookforum, The Guardian, San Francisco Chronicle, and other publications. Her short fiction has received a Best American Short Stories Distinction and earned a Pushcart Prize nomination in 2017.

In 2012, she received the NYC Emerging Writers Fellowship from the Center for Fiction.

She has taught at the Fashion Institute of Technology, City College of New York, and Sarah Lawrence College. O'Neill currently teaches at Vassar College, where she is an Associate Professor of English.

In 2025, O'Neill was honored with a Civitella Ranieri Fellowship in Writing.

=== The Hopeful ===
O'Neill's debut novel, The Hopeful, was released in 2015. The novel is about a figure-skating prodigy, sixteen-year-old Alivopro Doyle, an Olympic "hopeful" who suffers an accident leaving her addicted to painkillers. Publishers Weekly said of The Hopeful: "O’Neill nevertheless offers a new spin on the sports novel, rarely relying on easy metaphors and instead using Ali’s thwarted ambition to explore other ideas of heredity, ambition, maturity, failure, and, yes, hope." Kirkus Reviews said, "the book soars in its descriptions of figure skating, capturing its strange and brutal beauty and achieving a beauty of its own in the process."

The Hopeful was longlisted for the 2015 Center for Fiction First Novel Prize.

=== Quotients ===
Quotients was released in 2020. It was seen as a 'systems novel' in the vein of Don DeLillo and David Foster Wallace. When asked by BOMB magazine if this was the type of book she was expected to write, O'Neill said:

"If the systems novel has traditionally been associated with stories told by white men, perhaps it’s because too often it’s been assumed that books by women of color centering on racialized pain, especially in the private sphere, are the sum of what women of color are capable of—when of course we have more stories to tell—rather than an inherent incompatibility between the systems novel and the requirements of representing life at the margins. I see the problem as less about this story form than a view in which our primary recommendation is construed as 'authenticity.'"

In an interview with Soho Press, she said: "Being an Asian-American woman in a predominantly white society has made me attuned to the simultaneous illegibility and hypervisibility of my body, the watchedness that I mentioned is so important to the book. I have seen categories and expectations fail to contain me, just as the algorithms and dossiers fail to contain the characters in my novel."

Booklist said, "This challenging, slow-burning, yet suspenseful tale is a frame for O’Neill’s powerful and chilling warning to consider the choices we are making. With an astounding grasp of the issues confronting our age, an assured depiction of a multitude of diverse characters, and a distinctive style all her own, she ranges from movingly sensual descriptions to sharp observations, from wordplay to gut punches. In sum, this is a poignant lament for our time’s lost generation, which may be all of us." The Brooklyn Rail said, "The novel is a long, circuitous and often incredibly wordy meditation on love, life, parenthood, family, the lies we tell, technology, and the brutal machinations of global intelligence and terror."

=== Woman of Interest: A Memoir ===
O'Neill's debut memoir, Woman of Interest, was released in 2024. Part mystery novel and part tale of self-discovery, the book recounts the author's search for her birth mother in 2020 as she hires a private investigator and travels to South Korea to meet her mother. Publishers Weekly gave it a starred review: "In cool, noir-tinted prose shot through with wit and compassion, O’Neill presents her inquiry as a sort of metaphysical detective story. Readers will be riveted." Kirkus Reviews said, "The author’s details and nuanced layers of longing feel genuine, vulnerable, and vivid."

Patrick Cottrell at BOMB Magazine described it as a "Memoir that is simultaneously an investigation, a noir with a femme fatale, and a darkly humorous tale about what happens when one meets the person who has everything to do and nothing to do with one's life...a gorgeously melancholic recounting of O'Neill's upbringing...singular and transcendent." The New Yorker called the book a "Dark, deeply funny memoir...Dashiell Hammett meets 'Fleabag.'"

== Bibliography ==
=== Novels ===
- — (2015). The Hopeful. Ig Publishing. ISBN 9781632460028.
- — (2020). Quotients. Soho Press. ISBN 9781641291118.

=== Nonfiction ===
- — (2024). Woman of Interest: A Memoir. HarperOne. ISBN 9780063309869.

=== Short fiction ===
- "Her Lousy Shoes", Granta (April 2015)
- "Put a Finger", BOMB magazine (December 2022)
