= Encyclopedic novel =

Novel that is said to describe or define an entire culture

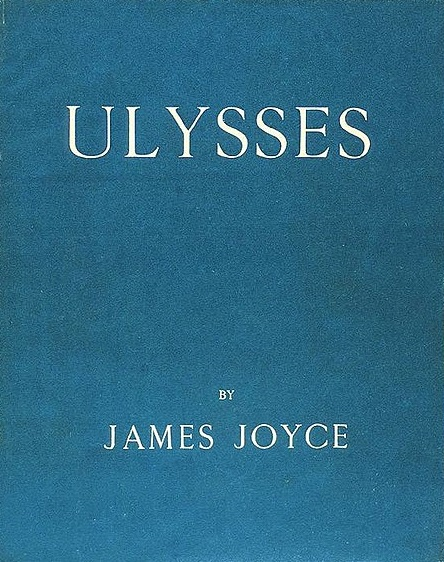
Mendelson considered James Joyce's Ulysses an "encyclopedic narrative".

The encyclopedic novel is a genre of complex literary fiction which incorporates elements across a wide range of scientific, academic, and literary subjects. The concept was coined by Edward Mendelson in criticism of Gravity's Rainbow (1973) by Thomas Pynchon, defined as an encyclopedia-like attempt to "render the full range of knowledge and beliefs of a national culture, while identifying the ideological perspectives from which that culture shapes and interprets its knowledge". In more general terms, the encyclopedic novel is a long, complex work of fiction that incorporates extensive information (which is sometimes fictional itself), often from specialized disciplines of science and the humanities. Mendelson's essays examine the encyclopedic tendency in the history of literature, considering the Divine Comedy (c.1321), Don Quixote (1605, 1615), Faust (1831), and Moby-Dick (1851), with an emphasis on the modern Ulysses (1922) and Gravity's Rainbow. Commonly cited examples of encyclopedic novels in the postmodern period include, in addition to Pynchon, Richard Powers' The Gold Bug Variations (1991), David Foster Wallace's Infinite Jest (1996), and Don DeLillo's Underworld (1997). Other literary critics have explored the concept since, attempting to understand the function and effect of "encyclopedic" narratives, and coining the related terms systems novel and maximalist novel.

== Mendelson ==
Mendelson put forward the concept of the encyclopedic novel in two essays on Gravity's Rainbow ("Encyclopedic Narrative" and "Gravity's Encyclopedia"). Mendelson described such novels as works created by an encyclopedic author, but clarified that some authors like Shakespeare or Pushkin spread encyclopedic elements across a wider collective body of work rather than a single epic masterpiece, while others might emulate the genre with mock-encyclopedias of purely fictional information (as with Gulliver's Travels) or otherwise fail to encompass the necessary breadth to fit Mendelson's definition (as with War and Peace). Mendelson also ascribed encyclopedic authors a nationalistic or patriotic function as codifiers of a single national culture that their work later comes to define, for example the Comedy for Florence and Italy, Don Quixote for Spain, Moby-Dick for the United States (compare Great American Novel), and Ulysses for Ireland. Encyclopedic authors are unique to their culture of origin, such that a culture cannot produce more than a single such author without one eclipsing and replacing the other, as Shakespeare did to Chaucer in England. Mendelson nonetheless distinguishes Gravity's Rainbow as self-reflexively proclaiming a new globalized culture of data and information in place of the geopolitical divisions that defined previous works.

Encyclopedic novels include "the full account of at least one technology or science" and the display of "an encyclopedia of literary styles, ranging from the most primitive and anonymous levels ... to the most esoteric of high styles". Their closest inspiration is frequently the epic poem or the Christian Bible, culminating in an encyclopedic concern with statecraft in depicting some sort of community or "City" established by the protagonists. Mendelson notes that there is often a short but significant interval between the era portrayed in the novel and the era of the novel's writing (as in, for example, James Joyce's Ulysses and Thomas Pynchon's Gravity's Rainbow). Mendelson states that "[b]ecause they are the products of an epic in which the world's knowledge is larger than any one person can encompass, they necessarily make extensive use of synecdoche". Orderly plot structures are often absent.

== Other perspectives ==
There has been considerable debate about the nature and function of the encyclopedic novel since Mendelson's exposition of the concept. Hillary A. Clark attributes to this type of discourse the importance of ordering the information which the writer discovers and retrieves. Moreover, Clark points out that encyclopedic texts have a long history, from the Renaissance Divine Comedy of Dante to Ezra Pound's modernist The Cantos. She explains that the urge to order the sum of all knowledge grew exponentially during the Renaissance and that by the 20th century we see writers such as Pound and James Joyce (whose Finnegans Wake is an example of an encyclopedic novel) simply recycling narratives. The encyclopedist's essential job regardless of the type of discourse, is to gather, recycle, and restate. The encyclopedic writer "returns to the role of the medieval scribe … reading and copying the already known, the popular, as well as the esoteric," and hence the encyclopedic novel assumes an almost "anti-creative" function. That said, encyclopedic writers, such as Melville, also "showed the elasticity of cataloguing: how it could be used as a literary device, stylistic trait, and even function as an argument".

The illusion of encyclopedism experienced by the reader of such a novel might represent the author's exploration of the assumptions and practices embodied in the production of a real encyclopedia. Along these lines, a post-structuralist analysis of the encyclopedic novel sees it as critical of encyclopedism, the ostensible goal of which is to capture the sum of all human knowledge. This critique suggests that the encyclopedic project is "tainted by its association with master narratives" and that it reinforces the "illusion of a totalizing system" of knowledge. Encyclopedic novels in this view are commentaries on the limits of such narratives and systems. Given that the aura of encyclopedism in a work of fiction is necessarily an illusion, it points to a failure—a "failure" which may align with a novelistic intent to "highlight the illusory basis of 'total knowledge'". From this perspective, encyclopedic fiction suggests that "we should not systematically encyclopedize but seek more 'open' approaches to knowledge". On the other hand, Gustave Flaubert's encyclopedic Bouvard et Pécuchet appears to achieve an opposite goal: in his relentless encyclopedic presentation of "facts and theories", the two main characters, Bouvard and Pécuchet, appear to be so absorbed in a world of knowledge, of having to gain knowledge, of needing to put knowledge to practical purpose, that Flaubert appears to suggest the civilization they inhabit lacks creativity and art.

While an encyclopedia is a factual reference work, a novel stands in opposition to it as a "literary nonreferential narrative". One critical review questions why a novelist would paradoxically reference a fictional universe, and what literary purpose is served by the proliferation of the "junk text" that is often a carrier of the encyclopedic conceit. When excessive real-world data is presented to the reader, the author's purpose is unclear: those readers who already know the material will find it superfluous, and those who do not know it may find that it adds nothing of interest to the text. Giving examples of "junk text" in encyclopedic fiction, the review cites "the pseudo-scientific cetology chapter" in Moby-Dick and "minor-character chatter about art and economics" in William Gaddis's The Recognitions (1955) and J R (1975). Yet, a defining characteristic of the encyclopedic novel is the presentation of unwanted or unnecessary information. Such writing "terminate[s] focused attention", and is in danger of boring the reader. One view of the encyclopedic novel's method, therefore, is that it requires the reader to practice modulating their attention to the text, bringing more consciousness to the act of filtering the important from the tangential. Encyclopedic novels such as Infinite Jest or House of Leaves include extensive and sometimes nonsensical footnotes referencing a variety of in-universe and out-of-universe subjects, thus directly adopting the conventions of academic writing while also creating a layer of "cruft" that the reader must actively parse in pursuit of the core narrative.

== See also ==
- Non-fiction novel
- National epic
- Ergodic literature

== Sources ==
- Bersani, Leo (Winter–Spring 1988). "Flaubert's Encyclopedism". Novel: A Forum on Fiction. 21 (2–3): 140–146.
- Boswell, Marshall (2012). "Introduction: David Foster Wallace and 'The Long Thing'". Studies in the Novel. 44 (3): 263–266. doi:10.1353/sdn.2012.0033.
- Burn, Stephen J. (2001). "At the edges of perception": William Gaddis and the encyclopedic novel from Joyce to David Foster Wallace (Doctoral thesis). Durham University.
- Clark, Hillary A. (1992). "Encyclopedic Discourse". Sub-stance. 21 (1): 95–110.
- Cohn, Dorrit (1999). The Distinction of Fiction. Baltimore: Johns Hopkins University Press.
- Ercolino, Stefano (2014). The Maximalist Novel: From Thomas Pynchon's Gravity's Rainbow to Roberto Bolano's 2666. Bloomsbury. ISBN 978-1-62356-496-4.
- Herman, Luc (2010). "Encyclopedic novel". Routledge Encyclopedia of Narrative Theory. Routledge. pp. 137–138.
- Herman, Luc; van Ewijk, Petrus (April 2009). "Gravity's Encyclopedia Revisited: The Illusion of a Totalizing System in Gravity's Rainbow". English Studies. 90 (2): 167–179. doi:10.1080/00138380902743203.
- LeClair, Tom (1989). The Art of Excess: Mastery in Contemporary American Fiction. University of Illinois Press.
- Letzler, David (2012a). "Encyclopedic novels and the cruft of fiction: Infinite Jest's endnotes". Studies in the Novel. 44 (3): 304–324. doi:10.1353/sdn.2012.0036.
- Letzler, David (2012b). The Paradox of Encyclopedic Fiction. NeMLA 2012.
- Mendelson, Edward (December 1976). "Encyclopedic Narrative: From Dante to Pynchon". MLN. 91 (6): 1267–1275. doi:10.2307/2907136. JSTOR 2907136.
- Mendelson, Edward (1976b). "Gravity's Encyclopedia". In Levine, George; Leverenz, David (eds.). Mindful Pleasures: Essays on Thomas Pynchon. Little, Brown. pp. 161–195.
  - Reprinted in Mendelson, Edward (1986). "Gravity's Encyclopedia". In Bloom, Harold (ed.). Thomas Pynchon's Gravity's Rainbow: Modern Critical Interpretations. New Haven: Chelsea House. pp. 29–52.
- Rasula, Jed (May 1999). "Textual Indigence in the Archive". Postmodern Culture. 9 (3). doi:10.1353/pmc.1999.0022.
- Warodell, Johan (2020). "Three Hundred Fifty Animal Species in Melville's Fiction". Leviathan. 22 (3): 68–74. doi:10.1353/lvn.2020.0032. ISSN 1750-1849.
