= The Great Chain of Unbeing =

2018 book by Andrew Crumey

- First edition
- Author: Andrew Crumey
- Cover artist: Marie Lane
- Language: English
- Genre: Literary Fiction
- Published: 09.03.2018
- Publisher: Dedalus Books
- Publication place: United Kingdom
- Media type: Paperback, e-book
- ISBN: 978 1 910213 77 3

The Great Chain of Unbeing is the eighth fiction book by Andrew Crumey, published by Dedalus Books in 2018. It was shortlisted for Scotland's National Book Awards (the Saltire Society Literary Awards) and nominated for the British Science Fiction Awards. The title alludes to the great chain of being and the book consists of stories that range widely in theme and style but are subtly linked. The book has been variously interpreted as a short story collection or novel.

Some of the pieces were previously published in different versions. The opening story, "The Unbeginning", first appeared as "Livacy" in the anthology NW15, published in 2007. Nicholas Royle commented then, "Andrew Crumey's unique blend of impenetrable physics and penetrating imagery, in 'Livacy', is as subtle and affecting as the best of his work." Another piece, "The Last Midgie on Earth" (a cli-fi set in a globally-warmed Scotland) first appeared in Headshook, published in 2009. Milena Kalicanin commented on it, "Scotland becomes Crumey's synonym for a postmodern utopia." A piece titled "The Burrows" first appeared in The Seven Wonders of Scotland (2012). Stuart Kelly wrote that it "imagines a subterranean Scotland, simultaneously a new frontier, an exploitable territory, and a metaphysical conundrum" and found it "both intellectually nimble and eminently re-readable."

== Reception ==
Adam Roberts wrote in Literary Review: "Andrew Crumey’s new book is a quasi-novel built out of connected short stories. It’s something for which we English have no specific term, but for which German critics have probably coined an impressively resonant piece of nomenclature (Kurzgeschichtenverkettung, maybe?). It’s as good an example of the form as I know... The Great Chain of Unbeing is unboring, unusual and quite brilliant."

Alison Bell wrote in the Scottish Review of Books: "Crumey has the perfect pedigree for what turns out to be something of a genre-romp through historical fiction, sci-fi, dark comedy and Brooklyn-twang McCarthy era spy thriller... He understands nuclear fission, the Big Bang theory, radio waves, the life cycle of the bed bug, and they’re all here... It’s clever stuff, ingenious, occasionally baffling and deeply satisfying."

Stuart Kelly wrote in The Scotsman: "This subtle stitching is reminiscent of previous works by Crumey. D’Alembert’s Principle was a triptych of stories where things interlinked. Both Mobius Dick and Sputnik Caledonia were again tripartite novellas that by winking between the stories became novels... In “Between The Tones” we meet Conroy, a concert pianist who narrates his life in the style of a Raymond Chandler hard-man."

Conroy also appeared in Crumey's novel The Secret Knowledge. Other names recurring from previous novels include writers Alfredo Galli (from Music, in a Foreign Language) and Heinrich Behring (from Mobius Dick). The book therefore fits T.C. Baker's description of Crumey's work as a whole: "These novels, crucially, do not amount to a sequence, nor is the relation between events in them ever straightforwardly causal. Instead, each novel covers similar ground in a series of overlapping folds, while remaining narratively distinct."

Jack Deighton wrote in Interzone: "His latest novel is unconventional even in Crumey’s terms... What we have here is perhaps a literary expression of sonata form – 'in the development the tunes get mixed up,' but with something to be discovered between the tones yet nevertheless totally accomplished."

== Contents ==
Title	Description	Publication history
The Unbeginning	John Wood, a blind cosmologist, describes how his father witnessed an atom bomb test. He has a tribologist friend named Roy Jones.	An earlier version, "Livacy", appeared in NW15: The Anthology of New Writing, Volume 15, edited by Bernardine Evaristo and Maggie Gee (2007).
Tribology (or The Truth about my Wife)	In Moscow, Roy Jones is mistaken for an author named Jones, whose writing is praised by critic Richard Sand.	An earlier version, An Expedition to the Taiga, appeared in Magnetic North, edited by Claire Malcom (2005).
Introduction	An interviewer waits to meet Richard Sand at Cafe Mozart. Mention is made (p39) of Heinrich Behring and Alfredo Galli – fictional authors who featured in the novels Mobius Dick and Music, in a Foreign Language.	An earlier version, Meeting Mr Sand, appeared in Gutter 9 (2013).
Fragments of Behring (Four historical sketches)	The pieces are "Silk", "A Room in Delft", "Parable" (about Montaigne), "A Lesson for Carl" (about Beethoven).	"A Lesson for Carl" appeared in So, What Kept You: New Stories Inspired by Anton Chekhov and Raymond Carver edited by Tess Gallagher, Claire Malcolm, Margaret Wilkinson (2006).
Singularity	Patrick, a cosmologist and colleague of John Wood (p74), waits for results of a cancer scan. Another patient is Jack Fisher (p71). While waiting, Patrick sees a poster of a Greek island (p72).	An earlier version was broadcast on BBC Radio 4 in 2016.
The Assumption	Jack Fisher and his wife Fi are visited at their Greek island home by Jack's daughter Anna. The novella-length story ends with the words "a great chain of unbeing". It marks the mid-point of the book. The second half is mostly comical in tone and increasingly surreal.	
Between the Tones	Surreal comedy in multiple parts about a classical pianist called Conroy (namesake of a character in The Secret Knowledge) who thinks there is a plot against him, led by Richard Sand. Conroy discovers an old memoir by a radio engineer and amateur sf writer who assisted Edwin Howard Armstrong in the 1940s and met Theodor Adorno (a philosopher fictionally portrayed in The Secret Knowledge). The engineer also met Heinrich Behring (who was writing a novel about Beethoven) and was hired by the Rosier Foundation (a name from Mr Mee and Mobius Dick) for an obscure assignment possibly involving nuclear weapons.	
Fragments of Sand (Six little pieces)	The pieces are "The Post Artist", "Bug", "The Burrows", "Scenes from the Word-Camera", "The Last Midgie on Earth", "That Place Next to the Bread Shop".	"The Last Midgie on Earth" appeared in Headshook, edited by Stuart Kelly (2009). "The Burrows" appeared in The Seven Wonders of Scotland, edited by Gerry Hassan (2012).
Impossible Tales	Harry Blue, a "freelance philosopher", meets Richard Sand at Cafe Mozart. Sand is working on a translation of Alfredo Galli's Racconti Impossibili, or "Impossible Tales" (a book mentioned in Music, in a Foreign Language). The story is intercut with a science fiction story about the drug-taking crew of a "space trawler", and the storylines come together at the end.	
The Unending	Fantasy about a child born like a plant into a world of ice.	An earlier version, "Water of Life", was published in the Sunday Herald (2009).
