= D'Alembert (disambiguation) =

Jean le Rond d'Alembert (1717–1783) was a French mathematician.

d'Alembert may also refer to:

== Mathematics ==
- d'Alembert operator
- d'Alembert's principle
- d'Alembert's equation
- d'Alembert's formula
- d'Alembert's theorem

== Other uses ==
- d'Alembert (crater), on the Moon
- D'Alembert, Quebec, a community in Canada, now part of Rouyn-Noranda

== See also ==
- D'Alembert's Principle (novel), by Andrew Crumey
- Family D'Alembert, a series of science fiction novels by Stephen Goldin
