= Rosecrans Baldwin =

American novelist and essayist

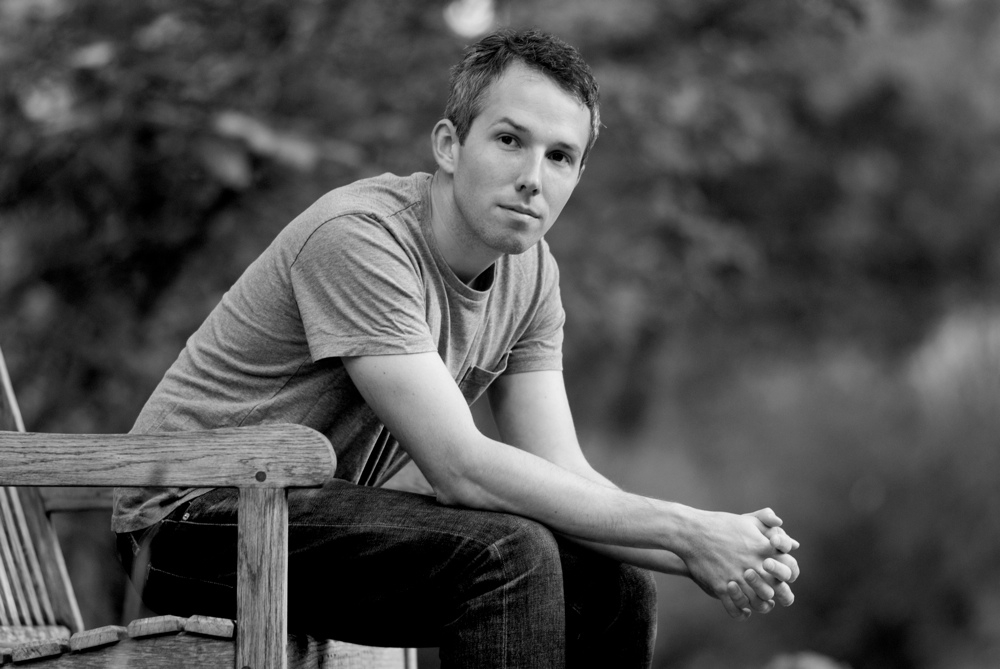
- Born: March 30, 1977 (age 49); Chicago, Illinois
- Education: Colby College
- Occupations: Novelist; journalist; essayist
- Website: Rosecransbaldwin.com

Rosecrans Baldwin (born March 30, 1977) is an American novelist, essayist and nonfiction author. He is also a co-founder and editor of The Morning News, an online magazine. Born in Chicago, Illinois and raised in Darien, Connecticut, Baldwin lives in Los Angeles, California.

== Books ==
Baldwin's most recent book, “Everything Now: Lessons from the City-State of Los Angeles,” (Farrar, Straus and Giroux, June 2021) was a Los Angeles Times bestseller, and it won a gold medal at the 2022 California Book Awards. The New York Times Book Review noted Baldwin “may have written the perfect book about Los Angeles.”

Baldwin is the author of a memoir Paris, I Love You But You’re Bringing Me Down (Farrar, Straus and Giroux, May 2012) based on the time he spent living in France while he worked in an unnamed advertising agency. It was named one of the Top 10 Travel Books of Spring 2012 by Publishers Weekly and earned positive reviews citing its humor and charm.

Baldwin's second novel, The Last Kid Left (Farrar, Straus and Giroux, 2017) was one of NPR's Great Reads of 2017. His debut novel, You Lost Me There (Riverhead Books, August 2010) was a New York Times Book Review Editor's Choice and an NPR Best Book of 2010: "A stunning debut… You Lost Me There is, finally, a wise book, the kind that eludes many authors twice Baldwin’s age... Profound, affecting, and true."

== Other work ==
Baldwin is a writer for GQ. Other work has appeared in Travel + Leisure, the Atlantic, the National Geographic, the New York Times, and Saveur, among other publications. He was a finalist in 2011 for a James Beard Foundation Award in Journalism.
