= Andrew Crumey =

British writer

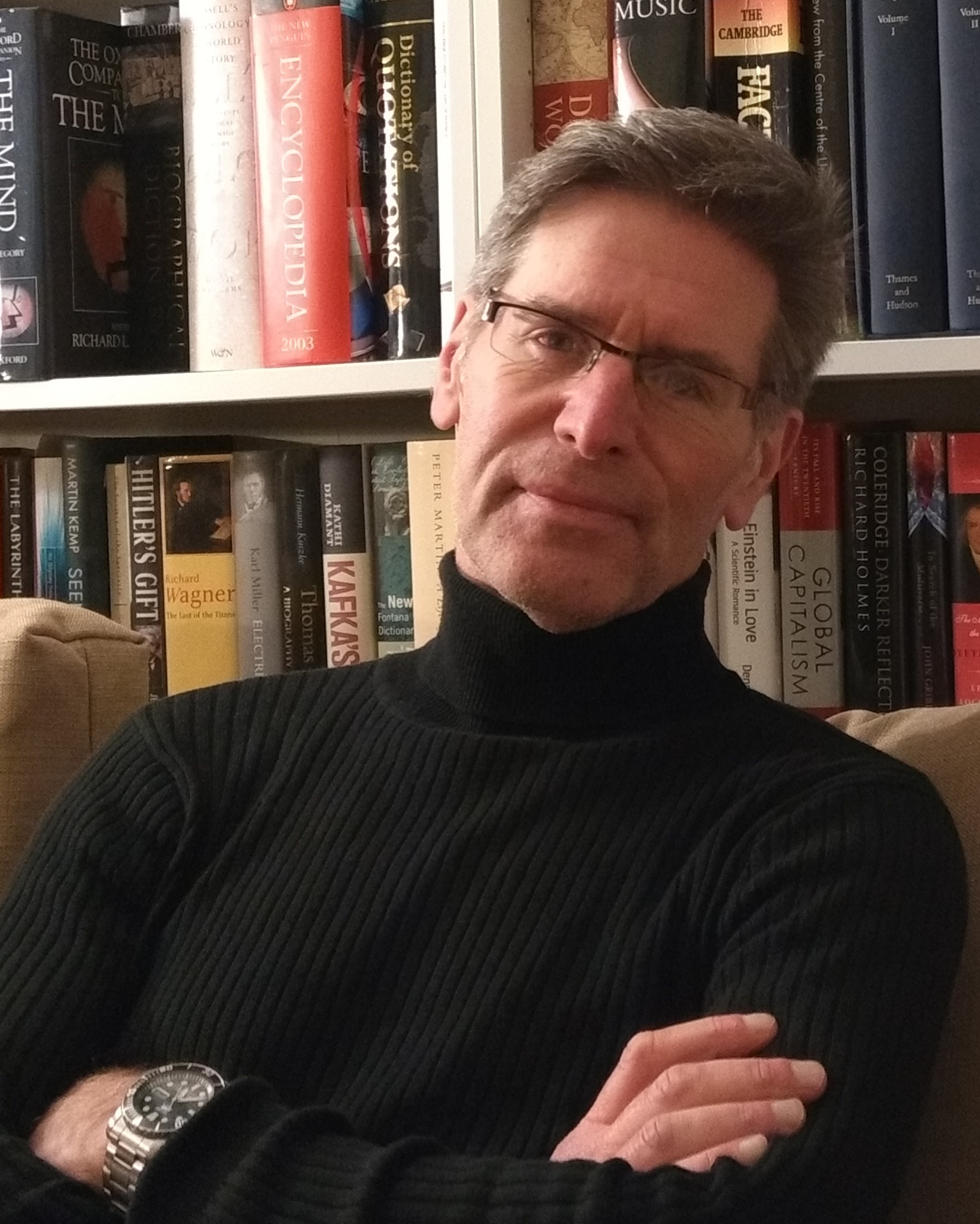
Andrew Crumey in 2021

Andrew Crumey (born 1961) is a Scottish novelist and former literary editor of the Edinburgh newspaper Scotland on Sunday. His works of literary fiction incorporate elements of speculative fiction, historical fiction, philosophical fiction and Menippean satire. Brian Stableford has called them "philosophical fantasies". The Spanish newspaper El Mundo called Crumey "one of the most interesting and original European authors of recent years."

== Life and career ==
Crumey was born in Glasgow, Scotland, and grew up in Kirkintilloch. He graduated with First Class Honours from the University of St Andrews and holds a PhD in theoretical physics from Imperial College, London. His thesis was on integrable systems and Kac-Moody algebras, supervised by David Olive.

Crumey's first novel, Music, in a Foreign Language, won the Saltire Society First Book Award in 1994. Its theme of alternate history was inspired by the many-worlds interpretation of quantum mechanics.

His second novel Pfitz was a New York Times "Notable Book of the Year" in 1997, described as "cerebral but warm and likeable". The sequel, D'Alembert's Principle took its title from a principle of physics.

Crumey was a regular book reviewer for Scotland on Sunday from 1996 and became the newspaper's literary editor in 2000. He won an Arts Council of England Writers' Award, worth £7,000.

In 2000 Crumey's fourth novel Mr Mee was longlisted for the Man Booker Prize and won the Scottish Arts Council Book Award. He followed it with Mobius Dick, described by Joseph O'Connor as "perhaps the only novel about quantum mechanics you could imagine reading while lying on a beach."

In 2003 Crumey was selected for Granta's "Best of Young British Novelists", but had been incorrectly submitted by publisher Picador, being over 40 at the time.

In 2006, Crumey became the fifth recipient of the Northern Rock Foundation Writer's Award for Sputnik Caledonia, which was also shortlisted for the James Tait Black Memorial Prize and Scottish Book of the Year.

In 2006 he became lecturer in creative writing at Newcastle University. In 2011 he was a visiting fellow at Durham Institute of Advanced Study, then became lecturer in creative writing at Northumbria University. It was during this time that he wrote The Secret Knowledge, published in 2013.

His PhD students at Newcastle and Northumbria Universities have included Alex Lockwood, Guy Mankowski and John Schoneboom

He has an interest in astronomy and in 2014 he published on the subject of astronomic visibility and Ricco's law.

His short story Singularity was broadcast on Radio 4 in 2016 and later published in The Great Chain of Unbeing.

In 2017 he was a contestant in the St Andrews team on BBC Two's Christmas University Challenge.

In 2018 The Great Chain of Unbeing was shortlisted for the Saltire Fiction Award. Adam Roberts wrote in Literary Review: 'Andrew Crumey's new book is a quasi-novel built out of connected short stories. It's something for which we English have no specific term, but for which German critics have probably coined an impressively resonant piece of nomenclature (Kurzgeschichtenverkettung, maybe?). It's as good an example of the form as I know.'

In 2023 he published his ninth novel, Beethoven's Assassins, described in The Irish Times as "a deliciously intellectual, ambitious book that explores time, metaphysics, narrative and pretty much everything, all at once."

In 2025 he completed the late Robert Irwin's unfinished novel Rapture of the Deep. Michael Caines wrote in the Times Literary Supplement, "Andrew Crumey testifies that Rapture of the Deep, his completion of this unfinished work, is half Irwin and half Crumey, at least in its word count."

== Critical reception ==
Jonathan Coe described Crumey as "a writer more interested in inheriting the mantle of Perec and Kundera than Amis and Drabble... Crumey seems so untouched by the post-war British tradition that he simply writes as if it never existed."

The Cambridge Companion to British Fiction Since 1945, commenting on unorthodox approaches to genre fiction by writers including Crumey, Frank Kuppner and Ken Macleod, said "Andrew Crumey is one of the most innovative and engaging Scottish writers to emerge out of this context in the last twenty years. His speculative fiction has a strong European and global dimension, drawing on the influence of Borges, Calvino and Milorad Pavić in its intricate, nested narratives, non-linearity, and ludic encyclopaedism."

In Twenty-First-century Fiction: Contemporary British Voices, Daniel Lea put Crumey in a list of "post-postmodernist" British writers that included Iain Banks, Bernardine Evaristo and Neil Gaiman, characterised by an "intermingling of genre and literary fiction."

Bent Sorensen bracketed Crumey with another physicist-turned-novelist, Alan Lightman, and discussed their move from science to literature using Pierre Bourdieu's concepts of "field", "position-taking" and "gatekeeping". Sorensen wrote that Crumey was "opposed to the postmodern epistemology when asked to define his world-view in philosophical terms... his fictional practice, however, can still fairly be characterized as postmodern."

Timothy C. Baker described Crumey's novels as "monadological", citing Deleuze's reading of Leibniz, and observing that "The relation between [Crumey's] novels is unusual: five of his seven novels explore, in various ways, the legacies of Enlightenment thought, often drawing upon the same ideas and figures. These novels, crucially, do not amount to a sequence, nor is the relation between events in them ever straightforwardly causal. Instead, each novel covers similar ground in a series of overlapping folds, while remaining narratively distinct."

Cultural theorist Sonia Front wrote, "The notion of parallel universes seems to be Andrew Crumey's favourite physical theory... His writings can be seen as a multiverse themselves, with the characters reappearing to live an alternative world-line in another novel."

Florian Kläger sees "a self-reflexive cosmopoetics of the novel" in the writings of Crumey, Martin Amis, John Banville, Zadie Smith and Jeanette Winterson.

== Works ==
- Music, in a Foreign Language (1994)
- Pfitz (1995)
- D'Alembert's Principle (1996)
- Mr Mee (2000)
- Mobius Dick (2004)
- Sputnik Caledonia (2008)
- The Secret Knowledge (2013)
- The Great Chain of Unbeing (2018)
- Beethoven's Assassins (2023)
- Rapture of the Deep (2025)

== See also ==
- List of comic and cartoon characters named after people
