= Music, in a Foreign Language =

1994 novel by Andrew Crumey

- Second edition
- Author: Andrew Crumey
- Cover artist: Willi Gray
- Language: English
- Genre: Literary Fiction
- Published: 1994 (Second edition 2004)
- Publisher: Dedalus Books
- Publication place: United Kingdom
- Media type: Paperback, e-book
- ISBN: 9781873982112

Music, in a Foreign Language is the first novel by physicist Andrew Crumey, published by Dedalus Books in 1994. It won the Saltire Society First Book Award for that year, in a ceremony broadcast on STV.

It is an alternate history novel that imagines Britain occupied by the Nazis during World War 2, becoming a communist state afterwards. The central character, Charles King, is a physicist and musician involved in a dissident journal. His story is embedded within that of a narrator writing in post-communist times. Crumey has said that inspiration came from the many worlds interpretation of quantum theory, and eighteenth-century philosophical fiction. The title comes from a poem within the novel, written by a character in response to one by C.P. Cavafy.

Crumey explained a further reason for his choice of setting in an interview. "The most significant was a research trip I made to the University of Wroclaw in Poland, whose Institute of Theoretical Physics was situated in what, until only a few years previously, had been the local Communist headquarters. There was still much evidence of the former occupancy, and this labyrinthine building captured my imagination. But the only way I could bring it into my own domain, was to imagine such a building existing in Britain."

Music, in a Foreign Language was published in the United States in 1996 by Picador USA. Translated editions were published in Greece, Denmark, Italy, Russia, Taiwan and Romania.

The book shares its title with a 2003 album by Lloyd Cole.

== Reception ==
Kirkus Reviews called it "a genuine novel of ideas, more than a little disorienting in the early going, as we labor to understand how its several parts will intersect—and surprisingly stimulating and exciting, as we see how Crumey imperturbably puts it all together. A formidable debut, from a writer whose possibilities, so to speak, seem virtually unlimited." Publishers Weekly called it "a thought-provoking but somewhat too ambitious debut."

Brian Stableford, in The A-Z of Fantasy Literature, called it "a polished exercise in postmodern/metafiction set in alternative world". The Cambridge Companion to British Fiction Since 1945 commented on the "inventive intertwining of science with literary and musical culture" in both Music, in a Foreign Language and Crumey's later novel, The Secret Knowledge. The book has been described within postcolonial scholarship as a "mock dystopia". Hartmut Hirsch related it to the theories of Michel Foucault, calling the novel "a spatial utopia that, at the same time, is a heterotopia... By giving Britain the characteristics of a socialist regime, one historical and cultural space is superimposed on another to produce a third, heterotopian space, which defamiliarizes Britain as well as socialist regimes in general. A fragmented history of this alternate Britain is reproduced in a text which is itself fragmented... The intertextual references to Borges, Svevo, Calvino and Eco are clear."
