= The Secret Knowledge =

Novel by Scottish writer Andrew Crumey

- First edition
- Author: Andrew Crumey
- Cover artist: Diego Rivera - Retrato de Adolfo Best Maugard - 1913
- Language: English
- Genre: Literary Fiction
- Published: 2013
- Publisher: Dedalus Books
- Publication place: United Kingdom
- Media type: Paperback, e-book
- ISBN: 9781909232563

The Secret Knowledge (2013) is the seventh novel by Scottish writer Andrew Crumey. It was his first since returning to his original UK publisher Dedalus Books, and was awarded a grant by the Arts and Humanities Research Council. Part of the writing was done while the author was visiting fellow at the Institute of Advanced Study. It was longlisted for the Guardian's "Not the Booker" prize.

== Synopsis ==
In 1913, composer Pierre Klauer hopes for marriage to his sweetheart and fame for his new work, The Secret Knowledge. Then tragedy strikes. A century later, concert pianist David Conroy hopes the rediscovered score might revive his own flagging career. Music, history, politics and philosophy become intertwined in a multi-layered story that spans a century. Revolutionary agitators, Holocaust refugees and sixties’ student protesters are counterpointed with artists and entrepreneurs in our own age of austerity. All play their part in revealing the shocking truth that Conroy must finally face – the real meaning of The Secret Knowledge.

== Themes ==
Some of the action is set in Scotland at the time of the Battle of George Square. Other parts are set in France, Spain, Italy, Germany and the United States.

Specific reference is made to the socialist Louis-Auguste Blanqui, and the philosophers Walter Benjamin, Theodor Adorno and Hannah Arendt, who appear as characters in the novel. A chapter set on Capri and based on Benjamin's love for Asja Lacis is written in the collage style of One Way Street. Benjamin's suicide at Portbou is also made part of the plot.

The novel is, in part, concerned with the concepts of the multiverse and quantum suicide, which have featured in previous novels by Crumey, and in articles and conference talks. Reference is made to motifs from Crumey's earlier novels, particularly the Rosier Corporation which appeared in Mobius Dick. The missing wife of pianist David Conroy (called Laura) appears to be the same character of that name, who appeared in Mobius Dick and is referenced again in The Great Chain of Unbeing.

== Reception ==
Publishers Weekly called it an "intelligent work of speculative fiction" with "heavy-handed melodrama" in places, but said "the philosophical questions the book raises are clever and insightful."

Reviewing it for the Historical Novel Society, Lucinda Byatt wrote: "Whether this qualifies as historical fiction is a moot point: it’s set in multiple pasts... Described as an “intellectual mystery”, the book explores the illusion of progress in history, perhaps also in our individual lives, a tribute to Benjamin’s own theories. Interestingly, the women are the most coherent and linear characters: Yvette and Paige, in particular, but even the historical figure, Hannah Arendt, who appears in the book alongside Theodor Adorno.

The Sunday Herald reviewer Lesley McDowell called it a "novel of ideas... more accessible than some may expect, and more gripping and more encompassing, too."

James Smart wrote in The Guardian, "With its enthusiasm for secret societies and acts that echo through time, The Secret Knowledge mines the fruitful ground between Cloud Atlas and Foucault's Pendulum, but fails to reach the heights of either. The dialogue can be tooth-wrenchingly annoying... but some scenes – a febrile union meeting, a loaded meeting between rival pianists – are wonderful."
