= Chain Islets =

Islets in Southwestern Canada

- Location within British Columbia

Geography
- Location: East coast of Oak Bay, British Columbia
- Coordinates: 48°25′00″N 123°16′00″W
- Type: Islets
- Total islands: At least 18
- Major islands: Great Chain Island

Administration
- Canada

The Chain Islets and Great Chain Island (occasionally Great Chain Islet) are a group of at least 18 islets situated off the east coast of Oak Bay, British Columbia, Canada. They lie in Mayor Channel about halfway between Mary Tod Island (W) and Discovery Island (E). Most of the islets are very small, rocky, and are unnamed, except for Great Chain Island which is covered in grass and herbaceous cover with occasional shrub thickets. The islets are noted as an important gathering place for harbor seals in the summer and for many seabirds such as seagulls and cormorants.
