= Infinite Jest =

1996 novel by David Foster Wallace

- Author: David Foster Wallace
- Language: English
- Genre: New sincerity; metamodernism; literary fiction; post-postmodernism; encyclopedic novel
- Publisher: Little, Brown and Company
- Publication date: February 1, 1996
- Publication place: United States
- Media type: Print (hardcover · paperback)
- Pages: 1,079
- ISBN: 978-0-316-92004-9
- Dewey Decimal: 813/.54 20
- LC Class: PS3573.A425635

Infinite Jest is a 1996 novel by American writer David Foster Wallace. Often considered Wallace’s magnum opus, the book has been categorized as an encyclopedic novel due to its unconventional narrative structure and hundreds of extensive endnotes, some with footnotes of their own.

A literary fiction bestseller after having sold 44,000 hardcover copies in its first year of publication, Infinite Jest has since sold more than a million copies worldwide. Since its initial publication it has been published with forewords by Dave Eggers, Tom Bissell, and Michelle Zauner for its 10th, 20th, and 30th anniversaries, respectively.

== Development ==
Wallace began Infinite Jest, "or something like it", several times between 1986 and 1989. His efforts in 1991–92 were more productive; by the end of 1993, he had a working draft of the novel.

From early 1992 until the novel's publication, excerpts from various drafts appeared sporadically in magazines and literary journals including Harvard Review, Grand Street, Conjunctions, Review of Contemporary Fiction, Harper's Magazine, The Iowa Review, The New Yorker and the Los Angeles Times Magazine.

The book was edited by Michael Pietsch of Little, Brown and Company. Pietsch made suggestions and recommendations to Wallace, but every editing decision was Wallace's. He accepted cuts amounting to around 250 manuscript pages from his original submission. He resisted many changes for reasons he usually explained. (Note: Wallace also gave Steven Moore an early manuscript that Moore claims was 200 pages shorter than the final version. Trying to reconcile his account with Pietsch's, Moore wrote, "I suppose it's possible that, after revising and expanding the original manuscript, then adding some 200 pages of new material, Wallace went on to write an additional 300 pages, all while teaching at ISU, but that seems a bit much even for a prodigy like him.")

The novel gets its name from Hamlet, Act V, Scene 1, in which Prince Hamlet holds the skull of the court jester, Yorick, and says, "Alas, poor Yorick! I knew him, Horatio: a fellow of infinite jest, of most excellent fancy: he hath borne me on his back a thousand times; and now, how abhorred in my imagination it is!"

Wallace's working title for Infinite Jest was A Failed Entertainment.

== Setting ==
In the novel's future world, the United States, Canada, and Mexico together compose a unified North American superstate known as the Organization of North American Nations, or O.N.A.N. (an allusion to onanism). Corporations are allowed the opportunity to bid for and purchase naming rights for each calendar year, replacing traditional numerical designations with ostensibly honorary monikers bearing corporate names. Although the narrative is fragmented and spans several "named" years, most of the story takes place during "The Year of the Depend Adult Undergarment" (Y.D.A.U.).

On the orders of U.S. President Johnny Gentle (a germaphobic singer and politician who campaigned on the platform of cleaning up the U.S. while ensuring that no American would be caused any discomfort in the process), much of what used to be the northeastern United States and southeastern Canada has become a giant hazardous waste dump, an area "given" to Canada and known as the "Great Concavity" by Americans due to the resulting displacement of the border.

== Plot ==
There are several major interwoven narratives, including:

- A fringe group of Québécois radicals, Les Assassins des Fauteuils Rollents (lit. 'The Wheelchair Assassins'; A.F.R.), planning a violent coup to free Quebec from O.N.A.N.
- Addicts living in Boston reaching "rock bottom" with substance abuse before entering a residential drug-and-alcohol-recovery program, Ennet House Drug and Alcohol Recovery House, where they progress in recovery through Alcoholics Anonymous (AA) and Narcotics Anonymous (NA).
- Students training and studying at the Enfield Tennis Academy (E.T.A.), founded by James Incandenza and now run by Avril Incandenza and Avril's adopted brother Charles Tavis.
- The personal drama of the Incandenza family, centering around Hal's struggles to live up to high expectations of academic and athletic success amid wider dysfunction.

These narratives are connected via a film, Infinite Jest, also called "the Entertainment" or "the samizdat". The film is so compelling that its viewers lose all interest in anything other than repeatedly viewing it, and thus eventually die. It was James Incandenza's final work. He completed it during a period of sobriety that was insisted upon by its lead actress, Joelle van Dyne. The Québécois separatists seek a replicable master copy of the work to aid in acts of terrorism against the United States.

The United States Office of Unspecified Services (U.S.O.U.S.), a new government agency that combines the duties of the National Security Agency, Bureau of Alcohol, Tobacco, Firearms and Explosives, Drug Enforcement Administration, Central Intelligence Agency, Office of Naval Research, and Secret Service, aims to intercept the master copy to prevent mass dissemination and the destabilization of the Organization of North American Nations, or else to find or produce an anti-entertainment that can counter the film's effects. Joelle seeks treatment for substance abuse problems at Ennet House. A.F.R. member (and possible O.U.S. double agent) Rémy Marathe visits Ennet House, aiming to find Joelle and a lead to the master copy of "the Entertainment".

The novel ends without directly resolving several of its central plotlines.

== Major characters ==
=== The Incandenza family ===
- Hal Incandenza is the youngest of the Incandenza children and arguably the novel's protagonist, as its events revolve around his time at E.T.A. Hal is prodigiously intelligent and talented, but insecure about his abilities (and eventually his mental state). His friend Michael Pemulis calls him Inc, and his favorite thing to do is secretly smoke marijuana in the seclusion of the E.T.A. tunnels. He has difficult relationships with both his parents. He has an eidetic memory and has memorized the Oxford English Dictionary, and like his mother often corrects his friends' and family's grammar. Hal's mental degradation and alienation from those around him culminate in his chronologically last appearance in the novel, in which his attempts at speech and facial expressions are incomprehensible to others. The origin of Hal's final condition is unclear; possible causes include cannabis withdrawal, a drug obtained by Michael Pemulis, a patch of mold Hal ate as a child, and a mental breakdown from years of training to be a top junior tennis player.
- Avril Incandenza, née Mondragon, is the domineering mother of the Incandenza children and wife of James. A tall (197 cm, or 6' 5.5"), beautiful francophone Québécois, she becomes a major figure at Enfield Tennis Academy after her husband's suicide and begins, or perhaps continues, a relationship with Charles Tavis, the school's new head, also a Canadian and Avril's either adoptive or half-brother. Her sexual relationships with men are a matter of some speculation/discussion; one with John "No Relation" Wayne is depicted. Avril has phobias about uncleanliness and disease, closed doors, and overhead lighting, and is also described as agoraphobic. She has an obsessive-compulsive need to watch over E.T.A. and her two younger sons, Hal and Mario, who live at the school; Avril and Orin are no longer in contact. James Incandenza believes that he can connect with his children only through her. Orin believes she runs the family with ingrained manipulation and the illusion of choice. Her family nickname is "the Moms".
- James Orin Incandenza Jr., Avril's husband and Orin's, Mario's and Hal's father, is an optics expert and filmmaker as well as the founder of Enfield Tennis Academy (though he increasingly leaves E.T.A. business to Charles Tavis). The son of small-time actor James O. Incandenza Sr. (who played "The Man from Glad" in the 1960s), James Jr. created Infinite Jest (also known as "the Entertainment" or "the samizdat"), an enigmatic and fatally seductive film that was his last work. He used Joelle van Dyne, his son Orin's strikingly beautiful girlfriend, in many of his films, including the fatal "Entertainment". He appears in the book mainly in flashbacks or as a "wraith", having killed himself at the age of 54 by placing his head in a microwave oven. He is an alcoholic who drinks Wild Turkey whiskey. His family nickname is "Himself". Orin also calls him "the Mad Stork".
- Mario Incandenza is the Incandenzas' second son, although his biological father may be Charles Tavis. Severely deformed since birth—he is macrocephalic, homodontic, bradykinetic, and stands or walks at a 45-degree angle—as well as mentally "slow", he is nonetheless perennially cheerful and kind. He is also a budding auteur, having served as James's camera and directorial assistant and later inheriting the prodigious studio equipment and film lab his father built on the academy grounds. He is an avid fan of Madame Psychosis's dark radio show, partly because he finds her voice familiar. Hal, though younger, acts like a supportive older brother to Mario, whom Hal calls "Booboo".
- Orin Incandenza is the Incandenzas' eldest son. He is a punter for the Phoenix Cardinals and a serial womanizer, and is estranged from everyone in his family except Hal. It is suggested that Orin lost his attraction to Joelle after she became disfigured when her mother unintentionally threw acid in her face during a Thanksgiving dinner, but Orin cites Joelle's questionable relationship with his father as the reason for the breakup even though he later admits he knows there was no romance. Orin focuses his subsequent womanizing on young mothers; Hal suggests that this is because he blames his father's death on his mother. Molly Notkin, a friend of Joelle's, says that Orin has numerous "malcathected issues with his mother". Orin's relationship with his father was tense. His father tells Joelle "he simply didn't know how to speak with either of his undamaged sons without their mother's presence and mediation. Orin could not be made to shut up."

=== The Enfield Tennis Academy ===
- Michael Pemulis, a working-class teenager from an Allston, Massachusetts family, and Hal's best friend. A prankster and the school's resident drug dealer, Pemulis is also very proficient in mathematics. This, combined with his limited but ultraprecise lobbing, made him the school's first master of Eschaton, a computer-aided turn-based nuclear wargame that requires players to be adept at both game theory and lobbing tennis balls at targets. The novel takes place long after Pemulis's Eschaton days (the game is played by 12- to 14-year-olds), but Pemulis is still regarded as the game's all-time greatest player and remains its final court of appeal. His brother, Matty, is a gay hustler who was sexually abused by their father.
- John "No Relation" Wayne, the top-ranked player at E.T.A. He is frighteningly efficient, controlled, and machine-like on the court. Wayne is almost never directly quoted in the narrative; his statements are either summarized by the narrator or repeated by other characters. His Canadian citizenship has been revoked since he came to E.T.A. His father is a sick asbestos miner in Quebec who hopes John will soon start earning "serious $" in "the Show" (professional tennis) to "take him away from all this". Pemulis discovers Wayne is having a sexual relationship with Avril Incandenza, and it is later revealed that Hal is also aware of the relationship. Wayne may be sympathetic to, or actively supporting, the radical Quebec separatists.
- Ortho "The Darkness" Stice, another of Hal's close friends. His name consists of the Greek root ortho ("straight") and the anglicized suffix -stice ("a space") from the noun interstice, which originally derived from the Latin verb sistere ("to stand"). He endorses only brands that have black-colored products, and is at all times clothed entirely in black, hence his nickname. Late in the book Stice nearly defeats Hal in a three-set tennis match, shortly after which his forehead is frozen to a window and his bed appears either bolted or mysteriously levitated to the ceiling. There are indications that Stice is being visited by the ghost of James Incandenza.
- Lyle, E.T.A. weight room guru. He spends most of his time perched atop the towel dispenser in the lotus position. Lyle licks the sweat off the boys' bodies after they work out and in turn gives them life advice. His behavior is described by the narrator as unusual but "nothing faggy". Lyle is close to Mario, whom he sometimes employs to speak to players who struggle with self-esteem.

=== Ennet House Drug and Alcohol Recovery House ===
- Don Gately, a former thief and Demerol addict, and current counselor in residence at Ennet House. One of the novel's primary characters, Gately is physically enormous and a reluctant but dedicated Alcoholics Anonymous member. He is critically wounded in an altercation with several Canadian men, and much of the later part of the novel involves his inner monologue while he recuperates in a Boston hospital. Gately had a complicated childhood. His stepfather abused his mother. During his middle-school and high-school years, Gately's size made him a formidable football talent. During his period as an addict and burglar, he accidentally kills M. DuPlessis, a leader of one of the many separatist Québécois organizations featured in the novel. Gately is visited by the ghosts of James O. Incandenza and Lyle.
- Joelle van Dyne, also known as "Madame Psychosis" (cf. metempsychosis), a stage name she received from James Incandenza when she starred in his films (and later her on-air name in her radio show "60+/−"). She became acquainted with James through her college relationship with Orin Incandenza, who referred to her as "The Prettiest Girl of All Time", or P.G.O.A.T. She appears in the lethally addictive Entertainment, reaching down toward a wobbly "neonatal" lens as if it were in a bassinet and apologizing profusely, her face blurred beyond recognition. Extremely beautiful as a young woman, Joelle later becomes a member of the Union of the Hideously and Improbably Deformed (U.H.I.D.), whose members wear veils to hide their faces. According to Molly Notkin, Joelle's face was disfigured by a beaker of acid her mother threw, intending to hit Joelle's father, who had just revealed he was in love with her Joelle. Joelle says she wears the veil because her superlative attractiveness plagues her, causing her to suffer social and romantic isolation until she met Orin. Joelle tries to "eliminate her own map" (that is, die by suicide) in Notkin's bathroom by massive ingestion of freebase cocaine, which lands her in Ennet House as a resident. Gately and Joelle develop a mutual attraction.
- Randy Lenz, a "small-time organic-coke dealer who wears sportcoats rolled up over his parlor-tanned forearms and is always checking his pulse on the inside of his wrists". An Ennet House resident, he constantly asks the time but refuses to wear a watch and regularly violates the sobriety rule.
- Geoffrey Day, an Ennet House resident who struggles with the clichés of AA. He comes to Ennet House after putting his car through a sporting-goods store window.

=== Les Assassins des Fauteuils Rollents ===
Les Assassins des Fauteuils Rollents (A.F.R.), the Wheelchair Assassins, are a Québécois separatist group. (The use of "rollents" where "roulants" would be correct is in keeping with other erroneous French words and phrases in the novel.) They are one of many such groups that developed after the United States coerced Canada and Mexico into joining the Organization of North American Nations (O.N.A.N.), but the A.F.R. is the most deadly and extremist.

Other separatist groups are willing to settle for nationhood, but the A.F.R. wants Canada to secede from O.N.A.N. and reject the United States' forced gift of its polluted "Great Concavity" (or, Hal and Orin speculate, is pretending that those are its goals to put pressure on Canada to let Quebec secede). The A.F.R. seeks the master copy of Infinite Jest as a terrorist weapon to achieve its goals. The A.F.R. has its roots in a childhood game in which miners' sons lined up alongside a train track and competed to be the last to jump across the path of an oncoming train, a game in which many were killed or rendered legless (the group's wheelchair-using members all lost their legs this way).

Only one miner's son ever (disgracefully) failed to jump—Bernard Wayne, who may be related to E.T.A.'s John Wayne. Québécoise Avril's liaisons with John Wayne, and with A.F.R.'s Guillaume DuPlessis and Luria Perec, suggest that Avril may have ties to the A.F.R. as well. There is also evidence linking E.T.A. prorector Thierry Poutrincourt to the group.

- Rémy Marathe is a member of the Wheelchair Assassins who secretly talks to Hugh/Helen Steeply. Marathe is a quadruple agent: the A.F.R. thinks that he is a triple agent, only pretending to betray the A.F.R., while Marathe and Steeply know that he only pretends to pretend to betray them. He does this in order to secure medical support for his wife (who was born without a skull) from the Office of Unspecified Services. Late in the novel, Marathe is sent to infiltrate Ennet House in the guise of a Swiss drug addict.

=== Other recurring characters ===
These characters cross between the major narrative threads:

- Hugh Steeply, an agent who assumes a female identity ("Helen") for an operative role, with whom Orin Incandenza becomes obsessed. Hugh works for the government Office of Unspecified Services and has gone undercover to get information out of Orin about the Entertainment. He is the U.S.O.U.S.'s contact with the A.F.R. mole Marathe.
- "Poor Tony" Krause, a cross-dressing junkie and thief who steals a woman's exterior heart, causing her death, and later robs Ennet House residents.
- Marlon Bain, a former E.T.A. student who was close to Orin. His obsessive-compulsive disorder has made it nearly impossible for him to leave his apartment. Steeply contacts him for information about Orin and the Incandenzas.

== Style ==
Infinite Jest is a postmodern encyclopedic novel, famous for its length, detail, and digressions involving 388 endnotes, some of which themselves have footnotes. It has also been called metamodernist and hysterical realist. Wallace's "encyclopedic display of knowledge" incorporates media theory, linguistics, film studies, sport, addiction, science, and issues of national identity. The book is often humorous, yet explores melancholy deeply. The novel's narration mostly alternates between third-person limited and omniscient points of view, but also includes several first-person accounts.

Eschewing chronological plot development and straightforward resolution—a concern often mentioned in reviews—the novel supports a wide range of readings. At various times Wallace said that he intended for the novel's plot to resolve, but indirectly; responding to his editor's concerns about the lack of resolution, he said "the answers all [exist], but just past the last page". Long after publication Wallace maintained this position, saying that the novel "does resolve, but it resolves ... outside of the right frame of the picture. You can get a pretty good idea, I think, of what happens". Critical reviews and a reader's guide have provided insight, but Stephen Burn notes that Wallace privately conceded to Jonathan Franzen that "the story can't fully be made sense of".

Wallace said that Infinite Jest's structure, including its use of endnotes, was based on the fractal geometry of a Sierpiński triangle

In an interview, Wallace said the novel's heavy use of endnotes was a way to disrupt the linearity of the text while maintaining some sense of narrative cohesion. In another interview, he said the plotting and notes had a fractal structure modeled after the Sierpiński triangle.

English critic James Wood called the novel an exemplar of "hysterical realism", a term he also applied to works by Zadie Smith, Thomas Pynchon, and Don DeLillo. He criticized these novelists for seeking to "turn fiction into social theory" and as "evasive of reality".

== Themes ==
The novel touches on many topics, including addiction (to drugs, sex, and fame), withdrawal, recovery, twelve-step programs, death, family relationships, absent or dead parents, mental health, suicide, sadness, entertainment, film theory, media theory, linguistics, science, Quebec separatism, national identity, and tennis as a metaphysical activity.

The book's various plot threads, including Hal's struggle to succeed in a competitive academic and athletic environment, Gately's recovery from addiction, and the film Infinite Jest as an all-consuming form of entertainment, are tied together by an overarching theme of addiction and devotion. Conversations between Marathe, a double agent betraying the Quebecois separatist movement for the sake of his wife, and Steeply, an American agent and Marathe's contact, serve as a chorus for the story, with interludes where the two discuss the nature of entertainment and worship in American culture.

A form of addiction or devotion is central to nearly every character's life; literary critic Paul Curtis argues that addiction, "however abnormal, is the norm of the novel." Dependency recurs throughout the novel in forms beyond drugs and alcohol, including sex, achievement, and sports. The conversations between Marathe and Steeply contrast the pursuit of individual pleasure with the capacity to choose what to devote oneself to.

Worship and addiction remained a central theme of Wallace's work. In his 2005 commencement speech at Kenyon College, he said: "Everybody worships. The only choice we get is what to worship".

Critics have discussed the novel in relation to Wallace's ambivalent attitude toward postmodern irony. Infinite Jest makes extensive use of irony and self-conscious literary techniques, but Iannis Goerlandt and Christopher Bartlett have argued that it also explores the limitations of ironic detachment and attempts to establish more sincere forms of communication. The Alcoholics Anonymous sections have been particularly important to these readings, with characters encouraged to accept "clichéd" language and practices rather than maintaining a skeptical distance from them.

This interpretation has been challenged by others who argue that the novel's apparent "New Sincerity", particularly in the AA scenes, privileges the experiences of white male characters at the expense of Black characters and women.

== Literary connections ==
Infinite Jest draws explicitly or allusively on many previous works of literature.

As its title implies, the novel is in part based on the play Hamlet. Enfield Tennis Academy corresponds to Denmark, ruled by James (King Hamlet) and Avril (Queen Gertrude). When James dies, he is replaced by Charles (Claudius), the uncle of Avril's gifted son Hal (Prince Hamlet). As in the play, the son's task is to fight incipient mental breakdown in order to redeem his father's reputation.

Another link is to the Odyssey, wherein the son Telemachus (Hal) has to grow apart from his dominating mother Penelope (Avril) and discover the truth about his absent father Odysseus (James). (That pattern is also reproduced in the novel Ulysses, set in a realistic version of Dublin populated by a wide range of inhabitants, just as Infinite Jest is mostly in a realistic Boston with a varied population.) In one scene, Hal, on the phone with Orin, says that clipping his toenails into a wastebasket "now seems like an exercise in telemachry." Orin then asks whether Hal meant telemetry. Christopher Bartlett has argued that Hal's mistake is a direct reference to Telemachus, who in the first four books of the Odyssey believes his father is dead.

The links between Ulysses and Infinite Jest have also been pointed out by academics. Stephen J. Burn argues that Wallace's explicit use of Joycean language—including compound words like "scrotumtightening"—make its "Joycean heritage explicit". Dominik Steinhilber notes structural parallels between the two novels, including the dispersal of narration among numerous characters and the pairing of a young intellectual (Hal Incandenza or Stephen Dedalus) with an older, less educated, but more socially adept man (Don Gately or Leopold Bloom).

Steinhilber argues more broadly that Infinite Jest adapts Joyce's motif of "parallax"—shifts in perspective—and unusual structure to explore how different characters perceive and experience reality.

Links to The Brothers Karamazov have been analyzed by Timothy Jacobs, who sees Orin representing the nihilistic Dmitri, Hal standing for Ivan and Mario the simple and good Alyosha. Ellen Chances has also identified references to Notes from Underground, Crime and Punishment, The Idiot, and Demons.

The film so entertaining that its viewers lose interest in anything else has been likened to the Monty Python sketch "The Funniest Joke in the World", as well as to the "experience machine", a thought experiment by Robert Nozick.

Similarly, writer Hernan Díaz has drawn a parallel between Infinite Jest's "Entertainment" and Borges's short story The Zahir, in which a fictionalized version of Borges fixates on a coin so obsessively that it progressively displaces all other thought until the narrator anticipates perceiving nothing else. The story, which explores questions of free will that also run through Infinite Jest, was briefly referenced by Wallace in a New York Times review of a Borges biography.

Graham Foster has identified a number of parallels with Don DeLillo's 1972 novel End Zone, including the enclosed sporting environments of Logos College, End Zone's fictional university, and Infinite Jest's Enfield Tennis Academy. Foster also interprets the Eschaton sequence as an allusion to a war game played by characters in End Zone, with both games blurring the distinction between simulated and real violence.

== Critical reception ==
Infinite Jest was marketed heavily, and the publicity, which included a 10-city book tour and numerous interviews for Wallace, forced him to adapt to being a public figure. The publisher, Little, Brown, credited the book's success to this campaign, which included a series of cryptic teaser postcards to 4,000 people, announcing a novel of "infinite pleasure" and "infinite style". Rolling Stone sent reporter David Lipsky to follow Wallace on his "triumphant" book tour—the first time the magazine had sent a reporter to profile a young author in 10 years. The interview was never published in the magazine but became Lipsky's New York Times-bestselling book Although of Course You End Up Becoming Yourself (2010), of which the 2015 movie The End of the Tour is an adaptation.

Early reviews contributed to Infinite Jest's hype, many of them describing it as a momentous literary event.

In the Review of Contemporary Fiction, Steven Moore called the book "so brilliant you need sunglasses to read it, but it has a heart as well as a brain. Infinite Jest is both a tragicomic epic and a profound study of the postmodern condition." In 2004, Chad Harbach wrote that, in retrospect, Infinite Jest "now looks like the central American novel of the past thirty years, a dense star for lesser work to orbit".

In a 2008 retrospective, The New York Times called the book "a masterpiece that's also a monster—nearly 1,100 pages of mind-blowing inventiveness and disarming sweetness. Its size and complexity make it forbidding and esoteric."

Time magazine included the novel in its list of the 100 best English-language novels published between 1923 and 2005.

As Wallace's magnum opus, Infinite Jest was viewed as the center of the new discipline of "Wallace Studies", which, according to The Chronicle of Higher Education, "is on its way to becoming a robust scholarly enterprise."

Not all critics were as laudatory. Some early reviews, such as Michiko Kakutani's in The New York Times, were mixed, recognizing the inventiveness of the writing but criticizing the length and plot. She called the novel "a vast, encyclopedic compendium of whatever seems to have crossed Wallace's mind." In the London Review of Books, Dale Peck wrote of the novel, "it is, in a word, terrible. Other words I might use include bloated, boring, gratuitous, and—perhaps especially—uncontrolled." Harold Bloom, Sterling Professor of Humanities at Yale University, called it "just awful" and written with "no discernible talent" (in the novel, Bloom's own work is called "turgid"). In a 2000 review of Wallace's work to date, A. O. Scott wrote in The New York Review of Books, "[T]he novel's Pynchonesque elements [...] feel rather willed and secondhand. They are impressive in the manner of a precocious child's performance at a dinner party, and, in the same way, ultimately irritating: they seem motivated, mostly, by a desire to show off."

Some critics subsequently qualified their initial stances. In 2008, Scott, writing for Slate, called Infinite Jest an "enormous, zeitgeist-gobbling novel that set his generation's benchmark for literary ambition" and Wallace "the best mind of his generation". In 2018, Wood said he regretted his negative review: "I wish I'd slowed down a bit more with David Foster Wallace." Infinite Jest is one of the recommendations in Kakutani's book Ex Libris: 100 Books to Read and Reread.

== Adaptations ==
Playwright Ken Campbell worked on an adaptation of Infinite Jest for the Millennium. His concept was to have 1,000 performers who each paid $23 to take part in the event, which would last a week. It did not come to fruition. German theatrical company Hebbel am Ufer produced a 24-hour avant-garde open-air theatre adaptation in 2012.

Infinite Jest was adapted in Finnish for radio and broadcast in six episodes by Yle in January 2023.

== In popular culture ==
- The Parks and Recreation episode "Partridge" contains various references to the novel. For example, Ann and Chris take the "Incandenza-Pemulis Parenting Compatibility Quiz", and Ann's fertility counselor, Dr. Van Dyne, works at the C. T. Tavis Medical Center.
- The video for the Decemberists' "Calamity Song", directed by Parks and Recreation co-creator Michael Schur, recreates the novel's Eschaton chapter.
- The music video for MC Lars and Wheatus's "Finite Jest" recounts the plot of Wallace's novel from Hal's perspective, recreating scenes from the book.
- The Infinite Summer project, an online book group with the goal of reading Infinite Jest over a single summer, took place in 2009. It included daily commentary from well-known writers, musicians and media personalities.
- The indie pop rock band the 1975's song title "Surrounded by Heads and Bodies" was inspired by the novel's opening line. The band's lead singer, Matty Healy, was reading the book while in rehab.

== Translations ==
Infinite Jest has been translated:

- Blumenbach, Ulrich (2009). Unendlicher Spaß (in German). Köln: Kiepenheuer & Witsch. ISBN 978-3-462-04112-5.
  - In 2010, Blumenbach received the Leipzig Book Fair Prize and the Kurd Laßwitz Award for the translation.
- Nesi, Edoardo; Villoresi, Annalisa; Giua, Grazia (2000). Infinite Jest (in Italian). Roma: Fandango Libri. ISBN 978-88-87517-10-1.
- Telles de Menezes, Salvato; Teles de Menezes, Vasco (2012). A Piada Infinita (in Portuguese). Quetzal. ISBN 978-989-722-063-0.
- Covián, Marcelo; Calvo, Javier (2002). La broma infinita (in Spanish). Barcelona: Mondadori. ISBN 978-84-397-0236-8.
- Galindo, Caetano W. (2014). Graça Infinita (in Brazilian Portuguese). Companhia das Letras. ISBN 978-85-3592-504-3.
- Kerline, Francis (2015). L'infinie comédie (in French). Éditions de l'Olivier. ISBN 978-28-7929-982-2.
- Kemény, Lili; Sipos, Balázs (2018). Végtelen tréfa (in Hungarian). Jelenkor Kiadó. ISBN 978-9-636-76614-6.
- Polyarinov, Alexey; Karpov, Sergey (2018). Бесконечная Шутка (in Russian). AST. ISBN 978-5-17-096355-3.
- Valkonen, Tero (2020). Päättymätön riemu (in Finnish). Siltala / Sanavalinta. ISBN 978-952-234-653-7.
  - In 2021, Valkonen was awarded the Mikael Agricola Prize.
- Kozak, Jolanta (2022). Niewyczerpany żart (in Polish). Wydawnictwo W.A.B. ISBN 978-83-83180-26-7.
- Književnost, Svetska; Naslovi, Novi (2022). Beskrajna Lakrdija (in Serbian). Kontrast. ISBN 9788660361655.
- Yu, Bingxia (2023). 无尽的玩笑 (in Chinese (China)). 上海人民出版社 (Shanghai People's Publishing House). ISBN 9787208161757.
- Sapir, Michal (2023). "מהתלה אינסופית" (in Hebrew). Hakibutz Hameuchad.
- Farrokhi, Moeen (2024). "مزاح-بی‌پایان" (in Persian). Borj. ISBN 978-6227280708
- Henkes, Robbert-Jan (2026). "Eindeloos vertier" (in Dutch). Uitgeverij Koppernik.
- Matar, Adham Wahib (2022). Duʿāba lā tantahī دعابة لا تنتهي (in Arabic). Damascus: Dar Ninawa. ISBN 978-9933-38-281-0.
- Tarashchuk, Petro (2026). Neskinchennyi zhart Нескінченний жарт (in Ukrainian). Kyiv: Vydavnytstvo Zhupanskoho. ISBN 978-617-83-3653-0.

Infinite Jest Translations

== See also ==
- Although of Course You End Up Becoming Yourself
- The End of the Tour
- Something to Do with Paying Attention
- Infinite Summer
- Hysterical realism
- Postmodern literature
- "The Zahir"
