= Sputnik Caledonia =

2008 novel by Andrew Crumey

- First edition
- Author: Andrew Crumey
- Cover artist: Sara Fanelli
- Language: English
- Publisher: Picador
- Publication date: 2008
- Publication place: United Kingdom
- Media type: Print (hardcover, paperback)
- Pages: 553 pp. (paperback)
- ISBN: 9780330448413 (hardcover); 9780330447027 (paperback)
- OCLC: 183915929
- Dewey Decimal: 823.914 22
- LC Class: PR6053.R76 S68 2008

Sputnik Caledonia (2008) is a novel by British writer Andrew Crumey which won the Northern Rock Foundation Writer's Award, the UK's largest literary prize at the time.

It depicts a Scottish boy who longs to be a spaceman, is transported to a parallel communist Scotland where he takes part in a space mission to a black hole, and returns to the real world in middle age, possibly as a ghost. The novel is in three “Books”, with the central one (set in the alternate world) being longest, predominantly serious in tone, while the outer sections are shorter and more humorous. The title refers to the Russian Sputnik program and the alternative name for Scotland, Caledonia, suggesting the idea of Scotland as a satellite state of the Soviet Union.

The book was shortlisted for the James Tait Black Memorial Prize for fiction, losing to Sebastian Barry's The Secret Scripture. The other shortlisted authors were Mohammed Hanif, Adam Mars-Jones and Toni Morrison. It was also shortlisted in the fiction category of the Scottish Mortgage Investment Trust Book Awards, losing to James Kelman's Kieron Smith, Boy.

== Plot ==
=== Book One ===
Robbie Coyle, nine years old at the start of the book, lives in Kenzie in Scotland's Central Belt in the early 1970s. He dreams of going into space; but because of his father's anti-American, pro-Soviet views, he wants to be a cosmonaut rather than an astronaut. He picks up an Eastern European radio station called Voice of the Red Star, imagines it to be a telepathic signal from another planet, and begs to be taken there.

=== Book Two ===
Nineteen-year-old Robert Coyle lives in the British Democratic Republic – a Communist state founded after the overthrow of Nazi occupation in the “Great Patriotic War” – and has arrived at the Installation, a secret military base in Scotland, to take part in a space mission. A strange new object has been detected in the Solar System, believed to be a black hole, and the volunteers are to explore it telepathically. Robert has confused memories of the time before his arrival, and the reader is left guessing the connection between Books One and Two. Perhaps the Robbie of Book One has been transported to the other world as he wished; or perhaps the Robert in Book Two is a “parallel” version of the younger Robbie in Book One. The Installation itself is like a “black hole” in the sense that people arrive from the outside, but nobody ever seems to leave - except perhaps in death.

=== Book Three ===
In a present-day recognisable reality, Robbie's parents from Book One are now pensioners. Their story alternates with that of “the kid”, a runaway 13-year-old obsessed with science fiction stories such as Doctor Who, and with the idea that “in an infinite universe everything is possible”. He meets a middle aged man (“the stranger”) who claims to be a spaceman on a mission. The stranger could be the parallel-world Robert grown older - or a terrorist engaged in identity theft. Resisting logical resolution, the novel reprises and reworks themes that have recurred throughout the course of the book, creating an aesthetic unity that is emotionally ambivalent: a juxtaposition of the comic tone of Book One with the dark pessimism of Book Two.

== Reception ==
Jonathan Coe called Sputnik Caledonia "the most impressive achievement yet from a still undervalued writer: in its combination of dystopian science fiction with warm but unsentimental childhood memoir, it struck me as being firmly in the tradition of - and worthy of comparison with - Alasdair Gray's Lanark."

In The Scotsman David Stenhouse wrote that Sputnik Caledonia was one of "very few" Scottish literary works that "actually does come close to 'envisioning' an alternative version of Scottish statehood".

Ken MacLeod called it a "very fine novel", adding "it looks like SF. But it can't be read as SF... In Sputnik Caledonia, the parallel world is a metaphor of what is lost in every choice. That's why the book is literary fiction and not SF, and is all the better for it."

== Critical analysis ==
David Goldie in The Cambridge Companion to British Fiction Since 1945 considered Sputnik Caledonia "reminiscent of Gray's Lanark in the way it doubles its central character, Robbie Coyle, a Scottish boy fixated on space exploration, with Robert Coyle, trainee cosmonaut in a parallel British People's Republic, contrasting homegrown Bildungsroman with dystopian counterfactual history."

Lisa Harrison compared Sputnik Caledonia with Matthew Fitt's But'n'Ben A-Go-Go. "Their fictive worlds are Scotland, though not as we know it - they each present a Scotland stripped of stereotyping, thus reformed and redefined through fiction."
