= Pfitz =

Novel by Andrew Crumey

First edition (publ. Dedalus Press) Cover artist: Lise Weisgerber

Pfitz is a 1997 novel by Scottish physicist and author Andrew Crumey. It concerns an 18th-century German prince who dedicates his life to the construction of imaginary cities. The name Pfitz is taken from an inhabitant of one of the prince's fanciful cities, Rreinnstadt.

In 1997, the book was named a notable book of the year by The New York Times. In that newspaper Andrew Miller said it, "makes for rewarding reading – cerebral, adroit, not afraid to take chances but never allowing itself to be seduced by theory, by mere cleverness."

It was published in Germany as Die Geliebte des Kartographen ("The Cartographer's Lover") and was the subject of a prize-winning television feature by Eva Severini.

In 2013 the Scottish Book Trust selected it as one of the 50 best Scottish books of the last 50 years.

== Critical analysis ==
Mark C. Taylor related the multiple "authors" in Pfitz to complexity theory. "Pfitz is not just about emergent complexity but is a brilliant enactment of it. One of the strategies Crumey and his coauthors use to generate complexity is to create multiple self-reflexive loops by folding authors and readers into each other until the line separating them becomes obscure."

Stephen J. Burn sees Pfitz, Tom McCarthy's Men in Space and David Mitchell's Number9dream as examples of a subgenre he terms "multiple drafts" novels, with Pfitz being "the earliest—and arguably the most representative—example of this form." Burn's term "multiple drafts" is borrowed from Daniel Dennett's model of consciousness. Burn writes that Pfitz shows "evident familiarity with Daniel Dennett's work" and says it "might be considered to provide the hidden internal blueprint for different levels of the novel's action."

Toon Staes sees Pfitz as a "systems novel", a term coined by Tom LeClair who applied it to writers including Don DeLillo, Thomas Pynchon, John Barth and Ursula Le Guin. In Staes' usage, "systems novels feature multiple nonlinear and fragmented narrative strands that gradually fix the reader's attention on a network of relationships," with Pfitz being "an interesting test case."

Colin Manlove described Pfitz as a "'postmodernist' fantasy" with "a vision of a universal machine of wheels and cogs that churns out infinite textual universes, each of which has no 'reality' as we commonly know it."
