= Mobius Dick =

2004 novel by Andrew Crumey

- First edition
- Author: Andrew Crumey
- Cover artist: Sara Fanelli
- Language: English
- Genre: Literary fiction
- Publisher: Picador
- Publication date: 2004
- Publication place: United Kingdom
- Media type: Paperback
- Pages: 320
- ISBN: 0-330-41992-7
- OCLC: 60549582

Mobius Dick (2004) is a novel by Andrew Crumey. It features an alternate world in which Nazi Germany invaded Great Britain and Erwin Schrödinger failed to find the wave equation that bears his name. This world becomes connected to our world due to experiments with quantum computers. The title parodies Moby-Dick.

The science-fiction plot centres on a mysterious mountain hospital in the Scottish highlands. Interweaving tales re-write the historical stories of Robert Schumann's stay in a similar clinic in Endenich and Schrödinger's visit to the Alpine sanatorium of Arosa, both of which echo the situation in Thomas Mann's The Magic Mountain. Connections are drawn from the tales of E. T. A. Hoffmann, particularly The Life and Opinions of the Tomcat Murr.

It was longlisted for the James Tait Black Memorial Prize.

== Reception ==
A Companion to Crime Fiction describes Mobius Dick as a 'metaphysical detective story', comparing it with Kobo Abe's Inter Ice Age 4 and Haruki Murakami's Hard-Boiled Wonderland and the End of the World, 'linking apocalyptic science fiction and metaphysical detective/mystery stories through antiphonal narratives, alternating "science" and "mystery" to yield reciprocal modes of displacement.'
