= List of Farrar, Straus and Giroux books =

This is a list of books originally published by Farrar, Straus and Giroux. Farrar, Straus and Giroux is one of the most prominent publishers of literature in the United States, with many of their books having received major literary awards, and with numerous Nobel Laureates published by them. Notable awards are indicated.

== A ==
- An Acceptable Time, Madeleine L'Engle (1989)
- Against Interpretation, Susan Sontag (1966)
- AIDS and Its Metaphors, Susan Sontag (1989)
- Alabama Moon, Watt Key (2006)
- The Anatomy Lesson, Philip Roth (1983)
- Annals of the Former World, John McPhee (1998) (Pulitzer Prize)
- Annie on my Mind, Nancy Garden (1992)
- The Arm of the Starfish, Madeleine L'Engle (1965)
- A Small Place, Jamaica Kincaid (1988)
- The Assistant, Bernard Malamud (1957)
- At the Same Time, Susan Sontag (2007)

== B ==
- The Bonfire of the Vanities, Tom Wolfe (1987)
- By Nightfall, Michael Cunningham (2010)

== C ==
- Call Me by Your Name, Andre Aciman (2007)
- The Caretaker Trilogy, David Klass (2006-2009)
- The Complete Stories, Flannery O'Connor (1971)
- The Corrections, Jonathan Franzen (2001)
- The Counterlife, Philip Roth (1986)
- Crewel, Gennifer Albin (2012)
- Cults of Unreason, Christopher Evans (1974)
- Celebration, Mary Lee Settle (1986)

== D ==
- Dark Archives, Megan Rosenbloom (2020)
- The Dawn of Everything, David Graeber and David Wengrow (2021)
- The Dead Father, Donald Barthelme (1975)
- The Discomfort Zone, Jonathan Franzen (2006)
- Dragons in the Waters, Madeleine L'Engle (1976)
- Dubin's Lives, Bernard Malamud (1979)

== E ==
- The Electric Kool-Aid Acid Test, Tom Wolfe (1968)
- The Emerald Light in the Air: Stories, Donald Antrim (2014)
- The Emperor of Water Clocks, Yusef Komunyakaa (2015)
- Everything I Need I Get from You: How Fangirls Created the Internet as We Know It, Kaitlyn Tiffany (2022)
- Everything on a Waffle, Polly Horvath (2001)

== F ==
- Farther Away, Jonathan Franzen (2012)
- The Field of Blood: Violence in Congress and the Road to Civil War, Joanne B. Freeman (2018)
- Fieldwork, Mischa Berlinski (2007)
- Find Me, André Aciman (2019)
- The Fixer, Bernard Malamud (1966)
- The Fool of the World and the Flying Ship, illustrated by Uri Shulevitz, from text by Arthur Ransome (1968)
- For the Union Dead, Robert Lowell (1964)
- Freedom, Jonathan Franzen (2010)

== G ==
- The Ghost Writer, Philip Roth (1979)
- Gilead, Marilynne Robinson (2004) (Pulitzer)
- God's Grace, Bernard Malamud (1982)
- The Great Fire, Shirley Hazzard (2003)

== H ==
- Harold: The Boy Who Became Mark Twain, Hal Holbrook (2011)
- The Heart of Redness, Zakes Mda (2002)
- High Cotton, Darryl Pinckney (1992)
- Holes, Louis Sachar (1998)
- Home, Marilynne Robinson (2008)
- A Home at the End of the World, Michael Cunningham (1990)
- Hot, Flat, and Crowded, Thomas Friedman (2008)
- The Hours, Michael Cunningham (2008)
- A House Like a Lotus, Madeine L'Engle (1984)
- Housekeeping, Marilynne Robinson (1980) (adapted into a 1987 film)
- How to Be Alone, Jonathan Franzen (2002)

== I ==
- I, etcetera, Susan Sontag (1978)
- Illness as Metaphor, Susan Sontag (1978)
- In America, Susan Sontag (1999)
- The Incest Diary (2017)
- Imagination Unlimited, edited by Everett F. Bleiler and T. E. Dikty (1952)
- Imperium, Christian Kracht (2015)
- The Israel Lobby and US Foreign Policy, John Mearsheimer and Stephen Walt (2007)

== J ==
- Joey Pigza Swallowed the Key by Jack Gantos (1998)

== K ==
- The Kindness of Women, J. G. Ballard (1991)
- The Killing Ground, Mary Lee Settle (1982)

== L ==
- Lancelot, Walker Percy (1977)
- The Last Gentleman, Walker Percy (1966)
- Lives of the Monster Dogs, Kirsten Bakis (1997)
- Losing Earth, Nathaniel Rich, (2019)
- Lose Your Mother, Saidiya Hartman, (2019)
- The Lost Books of the Odyssey, Zachary Mason (revised edition, 2010)
- Lost in the Cosmos, Walker Percy (1983)
- The Lottery and Other Stories, Shirley Jackson (1949)
- Love in the Ruins, Walker Percy (1971)
- Lush Life, Richard Price (2008)
- Luster, Raven Leilani (2020)

== M ==
- The Magic Barrel, Bernard Malamud (1958)
- A Man in Full, Tom Wolfe (1998)
- Many Waters, Madeleine L'Engle (1986)
- The Message in the Bottle, Walker Percy (1975)
- Middlesex, Jeffrey Eugenides (2002)
- Mr. Penumbra’s 24-Hour Bookstore, Robin Sloan (2012)
- My Life as a Traitor, Zarah Ghahramani and Robert Hillman (2007)

== N ==
- A New Life, Bernard Malamud (1961)

== O ==
- On Photography, Susan Sontag (1977)

== P ==
- A Philip Roth Reader, Philip Roth (1980)
- Pictures of Fidelman, Bernard Malamud (1969)
- Play It as It Lays, Joan Didion (1970)
- The Professor of Desire, Philip Roth (1977)

== R ==
- Radical Chic & Mau-Mauing the Flak Catchers, Tom Wolfe (1970)
- Reading Myself and Others, Philip Roth (1975)
- Regarding the Pain of Others, Susan Sontag (2003)
- The Right Stuff, Tom Wolfe (1979)

== S ==
- The Savage Detectives, Roberto Bolaño (2007, in translation, originally published 1998)
- The Second Coming, Walker Percy (1980)
- Selected Poems, Robert Pinsky (2011)
- The Sellout, Paul Beatty (2015)
- Slouching Towards Bethlehem, Joan Didion (1968)
- Specimen Days, Michael Cunningham (2005)
- Spooky Action at a Distance, George Musser (2015)
- Strong Motion, Jonathan Franzen (1992)
- Styles of Radical Will, Susan Sontag (1969)
- Superclass, David Rothkopf (2008)
- A Swiftly Tilting Planet, Madeleine L'Engle (1978)

== T ==
- The Thanatos Syndrome, Walker Percy (1987)
- Thinking, Fast and Slow, Daniel Kahneman (2011)
- Time to Come, edited by August Derleth (1954)
- The Topeka School, Ben Lerner (2019)
- Tuck Everlasting, Natalie Babbitt (1975)
- The Twenty-Seventh City, Jonathan Franzen (1988)
- Two Fables, Roald Dahl (1986)

== U ==
- Uncanny Valley, Anna Wiener (2020)
- Under the Sign of Saturn, Susan Sontag (1980)
- Unseen Hand, Adam Zagajewski (2011, in translation, first published in 2009)
- The Unwinding, George Packer (2013)
- The Undying, Anne Boyer (2019)

== V ==
- Varieties of Disturbance, Lydia Davis (2007)
- The Virgin Suicides, Jeffrey Eugenides (1993)
- The Volcano Lover, Susan Sontag (1992)

== W ==
- A Wind in the Door, Madeleine L'Engle (1973)
- Where the Stress Falls, Susan Sontag (2001)
- Woes of the True Policeman, Roberto Bolaño (2012, in translation, first published in 2011)
- Wolf in White Van, John Darnielle (2014)
- The women, Hilton Als (1996)
- A Wrinkle in Time, Madeleine L'Engle (1962)

== Z ==
- Zuckerman Unbound, Philip Roth (1981)
