= Medicine's Metaphors: Messages & Menaces =

1977 book by Samuel Vaisrub

Medicine's Metaphors: Messages & Menaces is a 1977 book by physician and medical editor Samuel Vaisrub about the use of metaphor and figurative language in medicine. Published by Medical Economics in Oradell, New Jersey. The book examines medical language borrowed from such fields as war, crime, mythology, fiction, religion, the sciences, animals, plants, machines and everyday objects. Later scholarship in the medical humanities has described it as an early study of metaphor in medicine.

== Background ==
Vaisrub was born in Russia in 1906, immigrated to Canada as a teenager, graduated from the University of Manitoba College of Medicine in 1932, and later worked as a physician, cardiologist and medical editor. He edited the Manitoba Medical Review from 1955 and became a senior editor at JAMA and an associate editor of Archives of Internal Medicine in 1965. Hektoen International later described Vaisrub as a prolific editorial writer and identified Medicine's Metaphors as one of the works for which he was remembered.

== Contents ==
George Dunea's 1977 review in JAMA reported that Vaisrub used the word metaphor broadly, applying it to the borrowing or extrapolation of concepts and theories from one field to another. Dunea wrote that the book was organized in three parts, with a section titled "Inflow" covering medicine's lexical debts to war, the criminal world, mythology, fiction, dreams, religion and science. Blum and Dunea later summarized the book as a study of non-medical sources of medical terminology, including military language such as fighting cancer or germs, mythological names such as Achilles tendon and Morpheus, and literary names derived from works including The Pickwick Papers, Alice's Adventures in Wonderland and Baron Munchausen's Narrative of his Marvellous Travels and Campaigns in Russia.

== Reception and legacy ==
The book received contemporary reviews by Dunea in JAMA and William B. Bean in Archives of Internal Medicine. Bean characterized the work as a commonplace book that collected favored words, expressions and ideas from medicine and medical writing. In Thinking with Metaphors in Medicine, Alan Bleakley called Medicine's Metaphors the first study of metaphors in medicine, while also judging it uneven: partly descriptive and list-like, but also containing more serious sections that reflected Vaisrub's medical experience and holistic view of future medicine. A 2019 letter in The Guardian by Bleakley and Jacinta Elliott placed Vaisrub's 1977 book alongside Susan Sontag's Illness as Metaphor in the modern study of medical metaphors and their effects on patients.
