= At the Same Time =

2007 nonfiction book by Susan Sontag

At the Same Time: Essays and Speeches
- Author: Susan Sontag
- Cover artist: Dorothy Schmiderer Baker
- Language: English
- Genre: Essay, criticism
- Publisher: Farrar, Straus and Giroux (US), Hamish Hamilton (UK)
- Publication date: March 6, 2007
- Publication place: United States
- Media type: Print (hardcover and paperback)
- Pages: 256
- ISBN: 978-0312426712

At the Same Time: Essays and Speeches is a nonfiction book by Susan Sontag published in 2007 by Farrar, Straus and Giroux. Sontag's first posthumously published book, it was edited by her friend Paolo Dilonardo and her assistant Anne Jump and features a foreword by her son David Rieff. At the Same Time includes pieces on literature, language and politics, as well as five speeches and lectures given by Sontag towards the end of her life.

== Contents ==
- “An Argument About Beauty”.
  First appeared in 2002 in the journal Daedalus.
- “1926… Pasternak, Tsvetayeva, Rilke”.
  Originally written in 2001 as a preface to a reissue by New York Review Books of Letters, Summer 1926 by Boris Pasternak, Marina Tsvetaeva and Rainer Maria Rilke. Shortly before the book's publication, the essay appeared in the Los Angeles Times under the title “The Sacred Delirium of Art.”
- “Loving Dostoyevsky”.
  Originally written in 2001 as the introduction to the first English translation of Summer in Baden-Baden by Leonid Tsypkin. Shortly before the book's publication, a different version appeared in The New Yorker.
- “A Double Destiny: On Anna Banti’s Artemesia”.
  Originally written as the introduction to a 2004 reissue by Serpent's Tail of Artemisia by Anna Banti. It first appeared in 2003 in the London Review of Books.
- “Unextinguished: The Case for Victor Serge”.
  Originally written in 2004 as the introduction to the English translation of The Case of Comrade Tulayev by Victor Serge. An abridged version appeared earlier in the year in The Times Literary Supplement.
- “Outlandish: On Halldór Laxness’s Under the Glacier”.
  Originally written in 2004 as the introduction to the English translation of Under the Glacier by Halldór Laxness. It also appeared in 2005 in The New York Times Book Review. This introduction is the last piece of writing that Sontag completed before her death in December 2004.
- “9.11.01”.
  An edited version appeared in 2001 in the “Talk of the Town” section of The New Yorker.
- “A Few Weeks After”.
  Originally written in 2001 in response to questions sent by Francesca Borrelli, a journalist for the Italian newspaper il manifesto. It has never before appeared in English.
- “One Year After”.
  First appeared in 2002 in The New York Times under the title “War? Real Battles and Empty Metaphors”.
- “Photography: A Little Summa”.
  First appeared in 2003 in the Spanish magazine El Cultural and in the Los Angeles Times under the title “On Photography (The Short Course)”.
- “Regarding the Torture of Others”.
  First appeared in a slightly different form in 2004 in The New York Times Magazine under the title “The Photographs Are Us”.
- “The Conscience of Words”.
  Speech given in 2000 in Jerusalem on the occasion of Sontag's acceptance of the Jerusalem Prize. It first appeared in print in 2001 in the Los Angeles Times.
- “The World as India”.
  Speech given in 2002 for the St. Jerome Lecture on Literary Translation at the University of East Anglia in Norwich, England. It first appeared in print in 2003 in The Times Literary Supplement.
- “On Courage and Resistance”.
  Keynote speech given in 2003 in Houston for the presentation of the Rothko Chapel Oscar Romero Award to Ishai Menuchin, chairman of Yesh Gvul, an Israeli soldiers’ movement for selective refusal. It first appeared in print in the same year in The Nation. In 2004, it was used as the foreword to Israeli journalist Peretz Kidron's book Refusenik! Israel's Soldiers of Conscience.
- “Literature Is Freedom”.
  Speech given in 2003 at St. Paul's Church in Frankfurt for the acceptance of the Peace Prize of the German Book Trade. Excerpts from the speech ran in 2003 in the Los Angeles Times and it was published in full in 2004 by Winterhouse Editions.
- “At the Same Time: The Novelist and Moral Reasoning”.
  Speech given in 2004 in Cape Town and Johannesburg for the first Nadine Gordimer Lecture.

== Reception ==
At the Same Time received generally favorable reviews. Publishers Weekly wrote, "Sontag's brilliance as a literary critic, her keen analytical skill and her genius for the searingly apt phrase... are all fiercely displayed here." Bloomberg News's Craig Seligman said that it "numbers among her finest books." The Daily Telegraph wrote, "At the Same Time reads like a greatest-hits album - a little politics, something on photography, some lit crit - of the range of her commitments and passions." Writing for The New York Review of Books, Eliot Weinberger gave the book a mixed review, praising some of Sontag's book introductions but criticizing the inclusion of five of her speeches and noting some apparent contradictions in her essays about the war on terror.

== Allegation of plagiarism ==
In a 2007 letter to the editor of The Times Literary Supplement, John Lavagnino identified an unattributed citation from Roland Barthes's 1970 essay "S/Z" in the last piece of the book, her speech "At the Same Time: The Novelist and Moral Reasoning". Further research led Lavagnino to identify several passages that appeared to have been taken without attribution from an essay on hypertext fiction by Laura Miller, originally published in The New York Times Book Review six years earlier. Writing for The Observer, Michael Calderone interviewed Sontag's publisher about the allegations, who said that "This was a speech, not a formal essay" and that "Susan herself never prepared it for publication."
