= The Way We Live Now (disambiguation) =

The Way We Live Now is a novel by Anthony Trollope.

The Way We Live Now may also refer to:

- The Way We Live Now (1969 TV serial), a British adaptation of Trollope's novel
- The Way We Live Now (2001 TV serial), a British adaptation of Trollope's novel
- The Way We Live Now (film), a 1970 American drama
- "The Way We Live Now" (short story), a story by Susan Sontag
- “(Don't Like) The Way We Live Now,” a song by Flare Acoustic Arts League from the album Hung, (Le Grand Magistery, 2003)
