= Elettra Stimilli =

Italian philosopher, academic and author

Eletra Stimilli
- Occupations: Philosopher, academic, and author

Academic background
- Education: University of Macerata; University of Salerno

Academic work
- Institutions: La Sapienza University of Rome

Elettra Stimilli is an Italian philosopher, academic and author. She is a professor of Theoretical Philosophy in the Department of Philosophy at the La Sapienza University of Rome.

Stimilli is known for her works on the connection between politics and religion, with an emphasis on contemporary thought.

== Works ==
Stimilli's work primarily explores the connections between religion, philosophy, and politics, with a particular focus on the relationship between contemporary Italian thought and the latest developments in French and German philosophy. Her monograph on Jacob Taubes explored his life, key relationships, and contributions to theological and political thought, particularly focusing on messianism, secularization, and Western eschatology in the context of 20th-century cultural experiences.

Stimilli's research has also explored the intersection of economics and religion, particularly analyzing debt from a philosophical perspective. Her book The Debt of the Living: Ascesis and Capitalism examined how the concept of debt, reinterpreted as a form of self-imposed discipline and perpetual guilt, underpins capitalist economies and drives contemporary consumption behaviors. Additionally, her other book Debt and Guilt explored the psychological and philosophical foundations of austerity policies, arguing that they were rooted in notions of guilt and punishment, and examined their impact on contemporary politics, economics, and individual inner lives. More recently, with her book Filosofia dei mezzi, she began a philosophical reflection on bodies as political means, making explicit the feminist point of view of her investigation.

== Awards and honors ==
- 2021 – Italian Studies Article Prize, The Society for Italian Studies

== Books ==
- The Debt of the Living: Ascesis and Capitalism (2017) ISBN 978-1-4384-6415-2
- Jacob Taubes. Sovranità e tempo messianico (2019) ISBN 978-88-372-3324-2
- Filosofia dei mezzi. Per una nuova politica dei corpi (2023) ISBN 978-88-545-2755-3 Trans. by Clara Pope as Philosophy of Means: Toward a New Politics of Bodies (2026). ISBN 978-1-5315-1516-4
