= Woman Seen from the Back =

Photograph by Onésipe Aguado de las Marismas

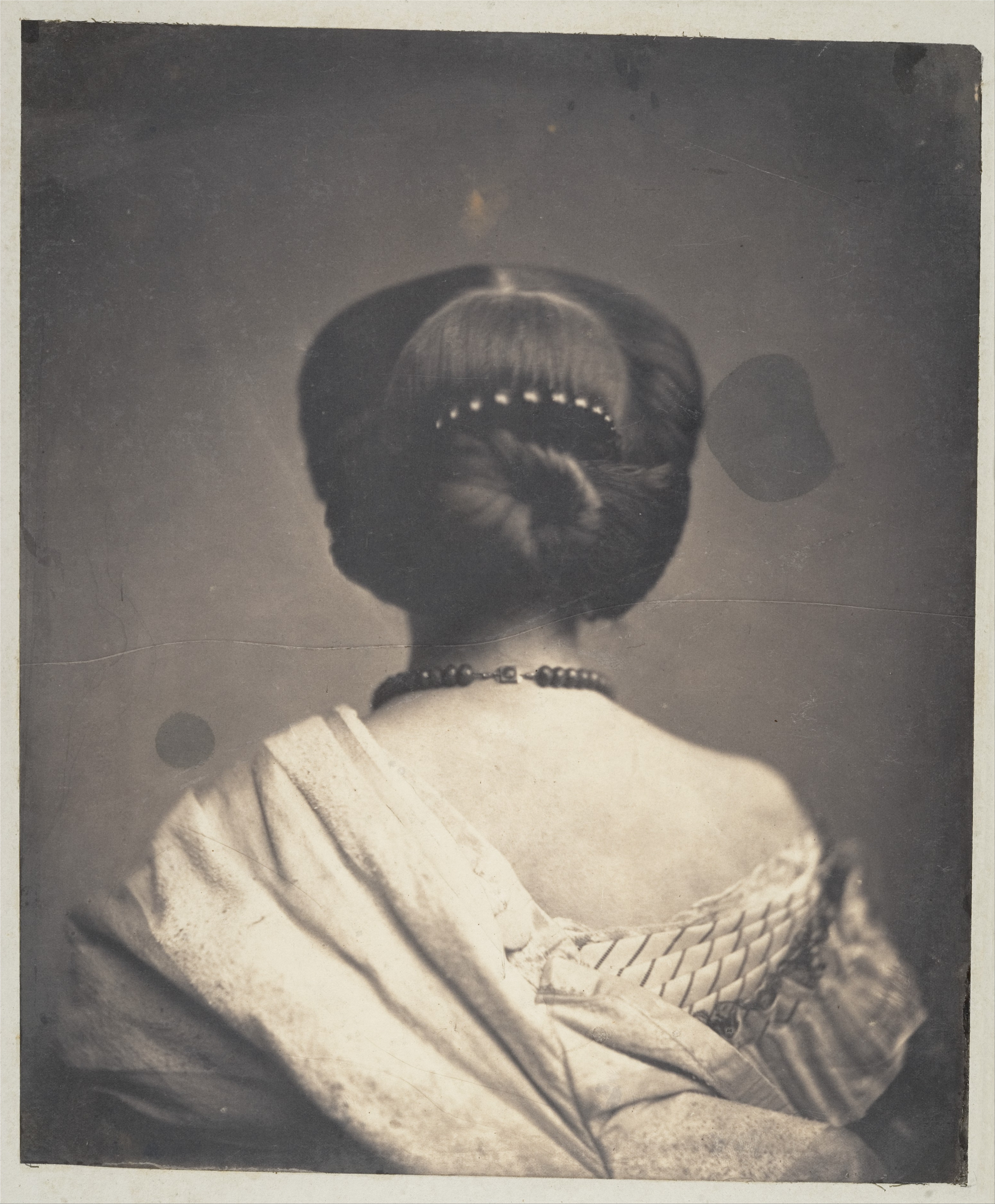
- Year: c. 1860s
- Location: Metropolitan Museum of Art
- Accession no.: 2005.100.1
- Identifiers: The Met object ID: 283121

Woman Seen from the Back is an 1860s photograph by 19th-century French photographer, Vicomte Onesipe Aguado de las Marismas (French, Évry 1830–1893 Paris). It is in the collection of the Metropolitan Museum of Art, and was purchased by the Museum in 2005 as part of the Gilman Photographs Collection.

== Early history and creation ==
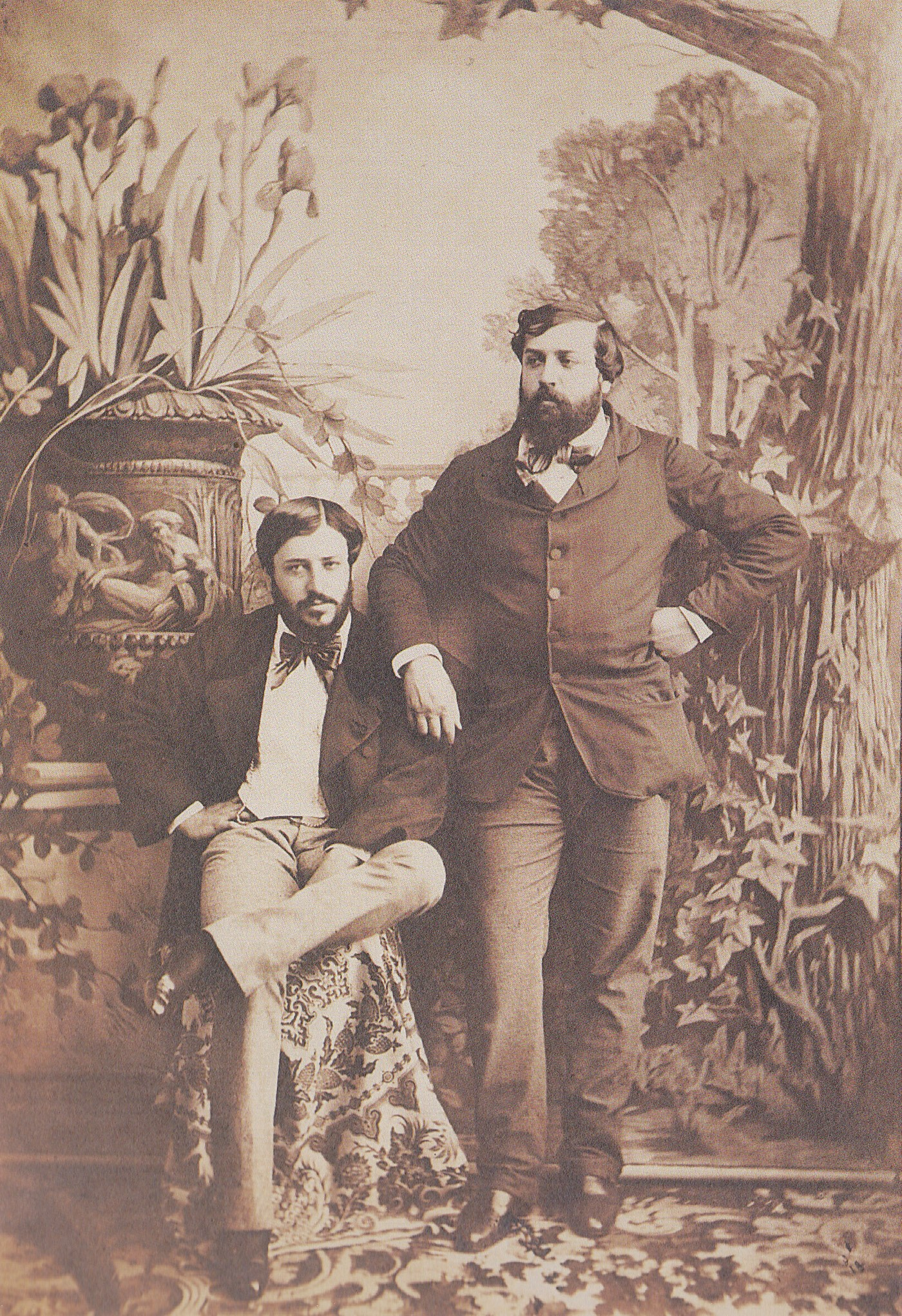
Onesipe, self-portrait with his brother, Olympe Aquado

Onesipe Aguado, born May 9, 1830, in Évry, France was the youngest of three brothers born to the wealthy banker Alexandre Aguado, marquis de las Marismas del Guadalquiver. Onesipe and his oldest brother Olympe Aquado were amateur enthusiasts who split their time between socialite activities, a close family life, and photography. Upon their father's death in 1842, Onesipe and Olympe inherited a considerable fortune that included vacation homes.

Onesipe and Olympe were students of Gustave Le Gray, and were active early members of the Societe Francaise de Photographie. They were early makers of photographic enlargements and known for their experimentations with photographic processes—producing daguerreotypes, cartes-des-visites, techniques with negative paper for landscapes and collodion on glass for portraits. They were also known for the diversity of their subjects—deserted interiors, close studies of trees as well as sweeping pastorals, portraits, reproductions of works of arts and snapshots of sailboats.

== Description and interpretation ==
The portrait, Woman Seen from the Back, a salted paper print from glass negative, suggests the wit and playfulness of its photographer. The image is devoid of depth, possibly an extension of the artists' work on foreshortening, making the sitter appear two dimensional and merely a silhouette.

== Later history and influence ==
Aquado's unique composition of his subject—that focuses on the subject's back, is also seen in the 1818 painting, Wanderer above the Sea of Fog by Caspar David Friedrich and later, in 1928, in La Mort des Fantômes (1928) by René Magritte.

The photograph illustrates the front cover of the first edition of Susan Sontag's 1999 novel In America.
