= One Way Street (book) =

Anthology of brief meditation

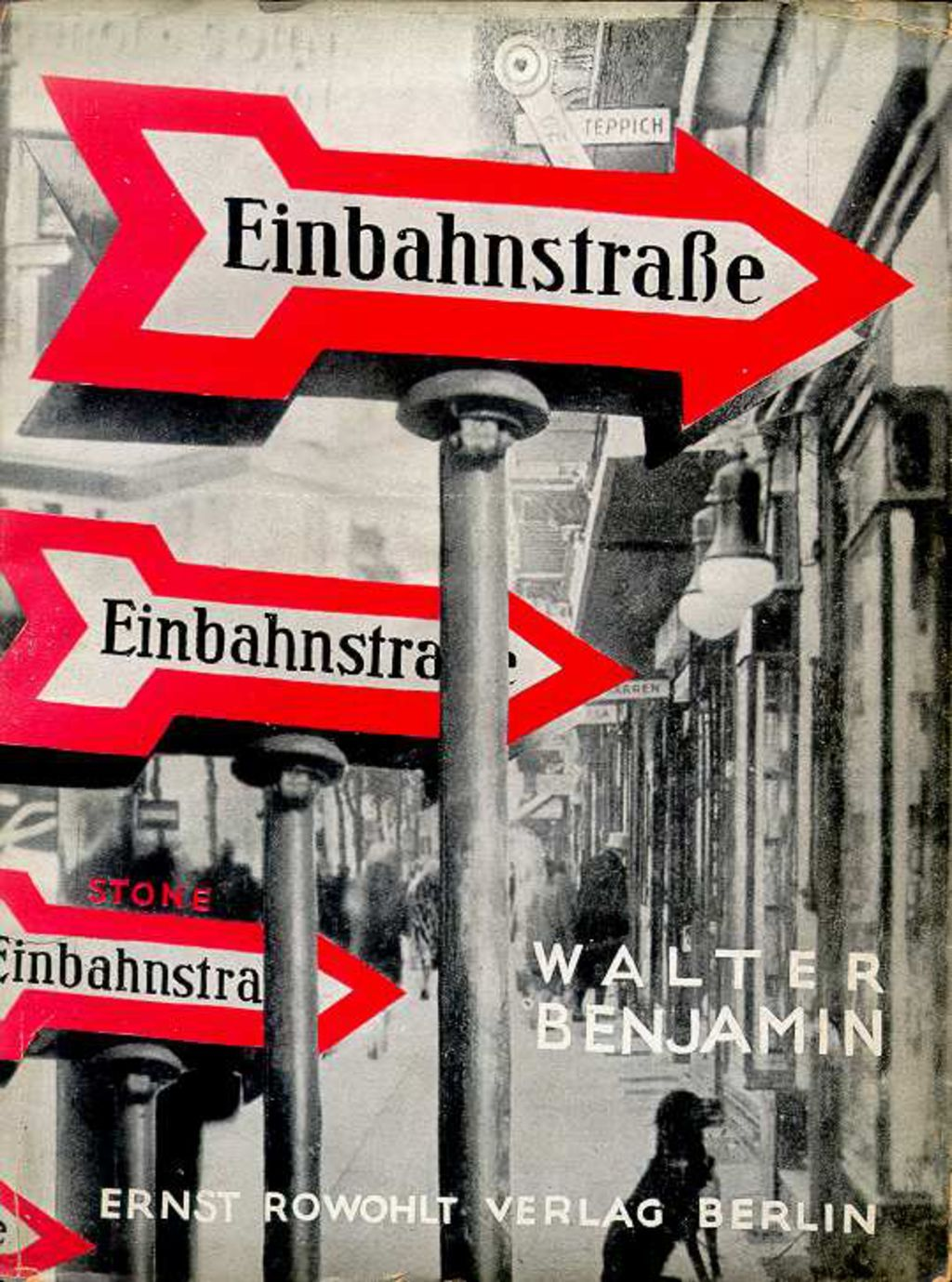
- Author: Walter Benjamin
- Language: German
- Subject: Philosophy, literary criticism, collage, surrealism, feuilleton, metaphysics
- Publication date: 1928

One Way Street (German: Einbahnstraße) is an anthology of brief meditations by Walter Benjamin collected and published as a book in January of 1928. The reflections composing its cycle were mostly written coterminously with the drafting phase of his doctoral thesis The Origin of German Tragic Drama, during his personally transformative though ultimately failed romance with Asja Lācis. Many of the pieces that were published individually prior to their appearance as a collection first ran as feuilleton in newspapers—a critical, artistic, sometimes purely humorous or bizarre space-filling feature of newspaper formats in Europe at the time.

== Style and content ==
The work is a kind of collage. Greil Marcus compares certain formal qualities of One Way Street to the surrealist graphic novel Hundred Headless Women by Max Ernst and André Breton, or to Walter Ruttman's The Weekend which was an early sound collage film. In his introduction to the work, Michael Jennings writes that the book avoids

all semblance of linear-narrative...[offering] a jumble of sixty apparently autonomous short prose pieces: aphorisms, jokes, dream protocols, cityscapes, landscapes, and mindscapes; portions of writing manuals, trenchant contemporary political analysis; prescient appreciations of the child's psychology, behavior, and moods; decodings of bourgeois fashion, living arrangements and courtship patterns; and time and again, remarkable penetrations into the heart of every day things, what Benjamin would later call a mode of empathy with 'the soul of the commodity'.

He continues: "Many of the pieces...first appeared in the feuilleton section," of newspapers and magazines which was "not a separate section but rather an area at the bottom of every page...and the spatial restrictions of the feuilleton played a decisive role in shaping the prose form on which the book is based."

Particularly significant or frequently excerpted and collected segments from One Way Street include "Imperial Panorama-A Tour of the Inflation" (an essay on the social and psychological effects of the German hyperinflation written in 1923 and dedicated to Gershom Scholem upon his emigration from Germany to Palestine) and "To The Planetarium" (1928).

== Form and influence ==
Written contemporaneously with Martin Heidegger's Being & Time Benjamin's work from this period explores much of the same territory though his contribution (characteristically, for Benjamin) hinges on an eclectic mix of art criticism, pure lyrical experimentation and political commentary rather than focusing directly on metaphysics.

He enters the arena of the academic argument around ontology and the Theory of Categories according to the technical conventions and requirements of the university in his contemporaneously written "Epistemo-Critical Prologue" to The Origin of German Tragic Drama (though this work was rejected at his habilitation). These elements of Benjamin's thought express themselves aesthetically in the more experimental work appearing as One Way Street.

"Traditional forms of writing were, for Benjamin, simply no longer capable of surviving in capitalist modernity--let alone of providing the framework for meaningful insights into its structure, functioning and effects," writes M.W. Jennings.

Greil Marcus's description of the formal problem that the work's fragmentary structure seems to address is more expansive. Totalitarian thinkers like Heidegger or "Mussolini, Stalin, Hitler and Adorno's [evocation of] the faceless capitalist made one argument about life: The whole is false," Marcus writes in his preface. He continues:

Wish I didn't know now what I didn't know then: looking back at what his dead friend knew then, Adorno grasped the ephemeral: "If the invention of the printing press inaugurated the bourgeois era, the time is at hand for its repeal by the mimeograph." But Benjamin had more than been there first.

A broad consensus traces the form of Adorno's Minima Moralia back to One Way Street. Adorno's lesser known work, The Jargon of Authenticity, traces and invokes the rivalry between Benjamin and Heidegger in their work on the territory of the Theory of Categories—expressed via antithetical and mutually antagonistic rhetorical strategies—as one of its themes.

== Related editions ==
Selections from One Way Street were collected in the second volume of Walter Benjamin's major works translated into English entitled Reflections in 1978, sandwiched between Berlin Childhood and Benjamin's travelogs.

As with the material from the earlier English translation collected in Illuminations, this was the first occasion on which the material contained in the anthology began reaching a wider audience and percolating into the canon of frequently cited works of theory and criticism within both the academy and areas of the more popular press. In 1968, Hannah Arendt published an article in The New Yorker to mark the publication of the first collection and John Berger's Ways of Seeing, a documentary series which quotes extensively from Benjamin, was broadcast in 1972. After Reflections began to appear in bookstores, Susan Sontag published her article "Under the Sign of Saturn" (soon to be anthologized as the title essay of her 1980 collection of recent works) in the New York Review of Books in 1978 that brought wider attention to the work.

Though Reflections continues to be published in new editions with the original introduction by Peter Demetz, a third book of selected essays, titled One Way Street & Other Essays has been released including the complete cycle of meditations from One Way Street and Sontag's 1978 essay as the introduction. This collection consists effectively a resequencing of the material from Reflections, with the complete cycle of One Way Street opening the collection, the awkwardly "dilettante-Marxist" essays on Brecht omitted, and two further works have been added (including "The Work of Art in the Age of Mechanical Reproduction" precursor study "A Small History of Photography" and Benjamin's monograph on Eduard Fuchs). This collection was preceded in its appearance by a stand-alone collection of the full English translation of the One Way Street cycle introduced by Greil Marcus and Michael W. Jennings in 2016.
