= On Women =

2023 essay collection by Susan Sontag

- Author: Susan Sontag
- Cover artist: Alex Merto
- Language: English
- Genre: Essay, criticism
- Publisher: Picador (US), Hamish Hamilton (UK)
- Publication date: May 30, 2023
- Publication place: United States
- Media type: Print (hardcover and paperback)
- Pages: 208
- ISBN: 978-1250876867

On Women is a nonfiction book by Susan Sontag published in 2023. Sontag's second posthumously published essay collection after At the Same Time (2007), it was edited by her son David Rieff and features an introduction by Turkish-American writer Merve Emre. On Women includes essays and interviews with Sontag about feminism, beauty, aging, sexuality, and fascism.

== Contents ==
- "The Double Standard of Aging".
  First appeared in 1972 in Saturday Review. It was later published in Susan Sontag: Essays of the 1960s & 70s (2013).
- "The Third World of Women".
  First appeared in 1973 in Partisan Review. It was later published in Susan Sontag: Essays of the 1960s & 70s (2013).
- "A Woman's Beauty: Put-Down or Power Source?".
  First appeared in 1975 in Vogue. It was later published in Susan Sontag: Essays of the 1960s & 70s (2013).
- "Beauty: How Will it Change Next?".
  First appeared in 1975 in Vogue. It was later published in Susan Sontag: Essays of the 1960s & 70s (2013).
- "Fascinating Fascism".
  First appeared in 1975 in The New York Review of Books. It was later published in Under the Sign of Saturn (1980) and in A Susan Sontag Reader (1982).
- "Feminism and Fascism: An Exchange Between Adrienne Rich and Susan Sontag".
  First appeared in 1975 in The New York Review of Books.
- "The Salmagundi Interview".
  First appeared in 1975 in Salmagundi. It was later published in A Susan Sontag Reader (1982).

== Reception ==
Publishers Weekly wrote, "Though the selections date from the 1970s, the insights remain topical and serve as a window into a brilliant mind whose analysis continues to provoke." Writing for The Washington Post, Becca Rothfeld called On Women "an indispensable new volume". Kirkus Reviews said the book was "[a] potent Sontag capsule compounded of legendarily smart prose and clever editorial decisions." In The Atlantic, author Katie Roiphe wrote, "Now that we are in the heyday of easy answers and offended pieties, Sontag’s stylish, idiosyncratic approach to the feminist debates and preoccupations of her era can be distilled pretty well into tangible guidance for ours. This is one of those moments when smart voices from other times can offer us clarity and fresh perspectives on our own."

Reviewing On Women for The Times, Christina Patterson praised Sontag's "brilliant, glittering intelligence" but noted some contradictions in her writing on Leni Riefenstahl’s Triumph of the Will and said that "[s]ome of her predictions — equal pay for equal jobs and near-universal abortion rights by the end of the 20th century — look wildly optimistic". Anna Leszkiewicz of the New Statesman gave On Women a mixed review, writing, "at times, Sontag’s determined rejection of complacency leads her to unfeeling, unsisterly arguments. She is sharp on the prison of beauty standards and the capitalist patriarchal forces that police it, but she has limited sympathy for women who refuse to free themselves from this cage."

In a highly critical review for The Observer, Rachel Cooke wrote, "Slowly, it begins to dawn on you that Sontag believes women have only themselves to blame for the inequality and discrimination they experience; that they have chosen to go along with it, unable to resist the powerful allure of lipstick and Tupperware. Is this a particularly egregious case of internalised sexism? Or is it just Sontag’s regular exceptionalism, in a creakier format? I don’t know. But again, I find myself amazed by her reputation, still so burnished almost two decades after her death."
