= The Benefactor (novel) =

1963 novel by Susan Sontag

The Benefacor
- First edition
- Author: Susan Sontag
- Publisher: Farrar, Straus & Company
- Publication date: 1963
- Media type: Print (hardback)
- Pages: 274

The Benefactor is a novel by Susan Sontag published in 1963 by Farrar, Straus & Company.

Sontag's first novel, it was inspired by the ancient Greek myth of Hippolytus of Athens and his step-mother Phaedra

== Reception ==
“Miss Sontag is an intelligent writer who has, on her first flight, jettisoned the historical baggage of the novel. However, she has not replaced it with material or insights that carry equal, or superior, weight. Instead she has chosen the fashionable imports of neoexistentialist philosophy and tricky contemporary techniques. She has made an unfortunate exchange.”—Literary critic Daniel Stern.

In an interview with critic John J. Enck, metafiction writer John Barth dismissed both the novel and its author:

I didn't especially care for The Benefactor. Sontag writes like a middle-aged French roue. She writes like Carl Jung dreaming he is Candide (1759). That makes it sound exciting, doesn't it? There's a picture of a good-looking chick on the back of the jacket, and a note that she teaches philosophy and theology at Columbia. Don't believe it. Susan Sontag does not exist.

New York Times reviewer Daniel Stern characterizes The Benefactor as a “picaresque anti-novel” and faults Sontag for failing to develop her protagonist, the aging Hippolyte, who existence as a literary figure emerges as little more than an “ambiguous dream.”

Reviewer Robert W. Flint at Commentary offers high praise for the novel: “Susan Sontag…has written a Marius the Epicurean for the 1960’s [and] it must be said that she has done so with a rapt and thorough awareness of what she was about.”

== Retrospective appraisal ==
New York Times literary critic Cynthia Ozick honors The Benefactor less for its “sly audacity” and more for its author's aesthetic legacy.

The Benefactor has no beneficiaries, no literary heirs, either in Sontag's own work or in that of her admirers. But society at large is heir to the cultural rupture, the linked discordances, that she championed.”

== Sources ==
- Enck, John J. and Barth, John. 1965. An Interview. Wisconsin Studies in Contemporary Literature, Vol. 6, No. 1 (Winter - Spring, 1965), pp. 3–14: University of Wisconsin Press. https://www.jstor.org/stable/1207341 Accessed 20 December 2025.
- Flint, Robert W. 1963. The Benefactor, by Susan Sontag; and Nickel Miseries, by Ivan Gold. Commentary, December 1963. https://www.commentary.org/articles/robert-flint/the-benefactor-by-susan-sontag-and-nickel-miseries-by-ivan-gold/ Accessed 21 December 2025.
- Ozick, Cynthia. 2006. “The Din in the Head.” New York Times, July 2, 2006. https://www.nytimes.com/2006/07/02/books/chapters/0702-1st-ozic.html Accessed 22 December 2025.
- Stern, Daniel. 1963. “Life Becomes a Dream” New York Times, September 8, 1963. https://archive.nytimes.com/www.nytimes.com/books/00/03/12/specials/sontag-benefactor.html
- Wasserman, Steve. 2015. Susan Sontag: Critic and Crusader. Los Angeles Review of Books, July 1, 2015. https://lareviewofbooks.org/article/susan-sontag-critic-and-crusader/ Accessed 22 December 2025.
