= One Way Street (disambiguation) =

One Way Street may refer to:

- one-way traffic
- One Way Street (1925 film), a 1925 American drama film directed by John Francis Dillon
- One Way Street, a 1950 American crime film directed by Hugo Fregonese
- One Way Street (book), a 1928 anthology of brief meditations by Walter Benjamin
- "One Way Street", song by Michael Learns to Rock from the album Blue Night
- "One Way Street", song by Soup Dragons from the album Hydrophonic
- "One Way Street", song by Aerosmith from the album Aerosmith
- "One Way Street", song by Go West from the album Bangs & Crashes
