= In Praise of Forgetting =

2016 book

In Praise of Forgetting: Historical Memory and Its Ironies
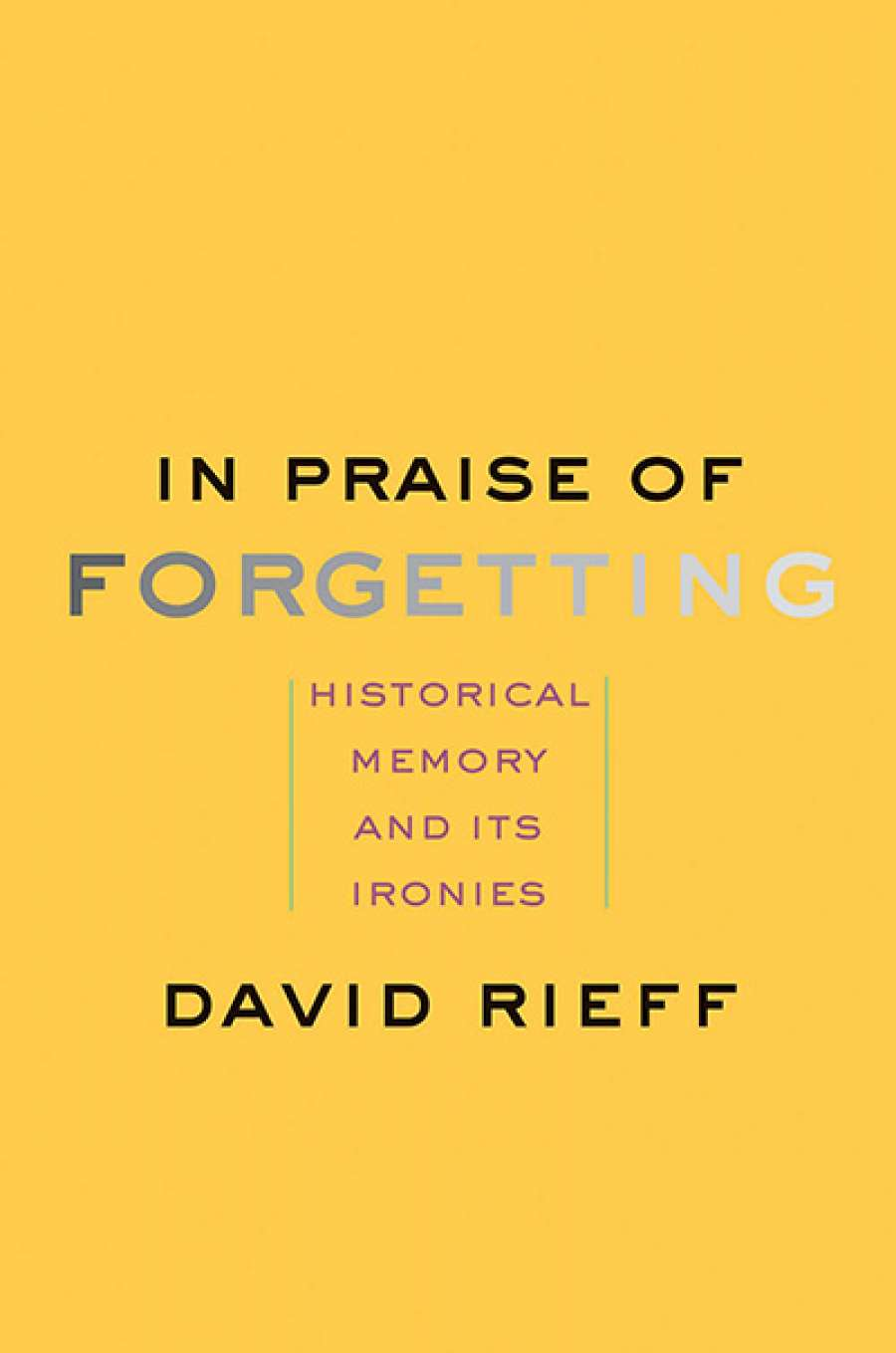
- Author: David Rieff
- Publisher: Yale University Press
- Publication date: May 10, 2016
- ISBN: 9780300182798
- OCLC: 1005287157
- LC Class: D16.9 .R534 2016

In Praise of Forgetting: Historical Memory and Its Ironies is a 2016 non-fiction book by David Rieff, published by Yale University Press. Rieff argues the contrarian position that sometimes history, including past mass atrocities, is better forgotten than commemorated: "whereas forgetting does an injustice to the past, remembering does an injustice to the present".

== Content ==
The book examines a range of case studies, from the end of apartheid in South Africa, Spanish transition to democracy and the related pacto del olvido, Chilean transition to democracy and the related amnesty for human rights abuses under the Pinochet regime, and others. Such studies draw extensively on Rieff's personal experience as a foreign correspondent in countries undergoing conflict. Rieff distinguishes history and (collective) memory: "History is about the past, whereas memory is about how we use the past for the present." The latter, he maintains, often has little to do with history and should not be uncritically celebrated as an end in itself. Rieff argues for a pragmatic weighing of the costs and benefits of remembering versus forgetting, rather than a morally absolutist position that memory is always desirable. He states that "collective memory deployed by communities, peoples, and nations has led to war rather than peace, rancour rather than reconciliation, revenge rather than forgiveness... the invocation of historical memory serves to accentuate differences rather than bridge them". Rieff argues that intractable conflicts and "memory wars" might sometimes be ended if societies underwent the right kind of forgetting.

== Reception ==
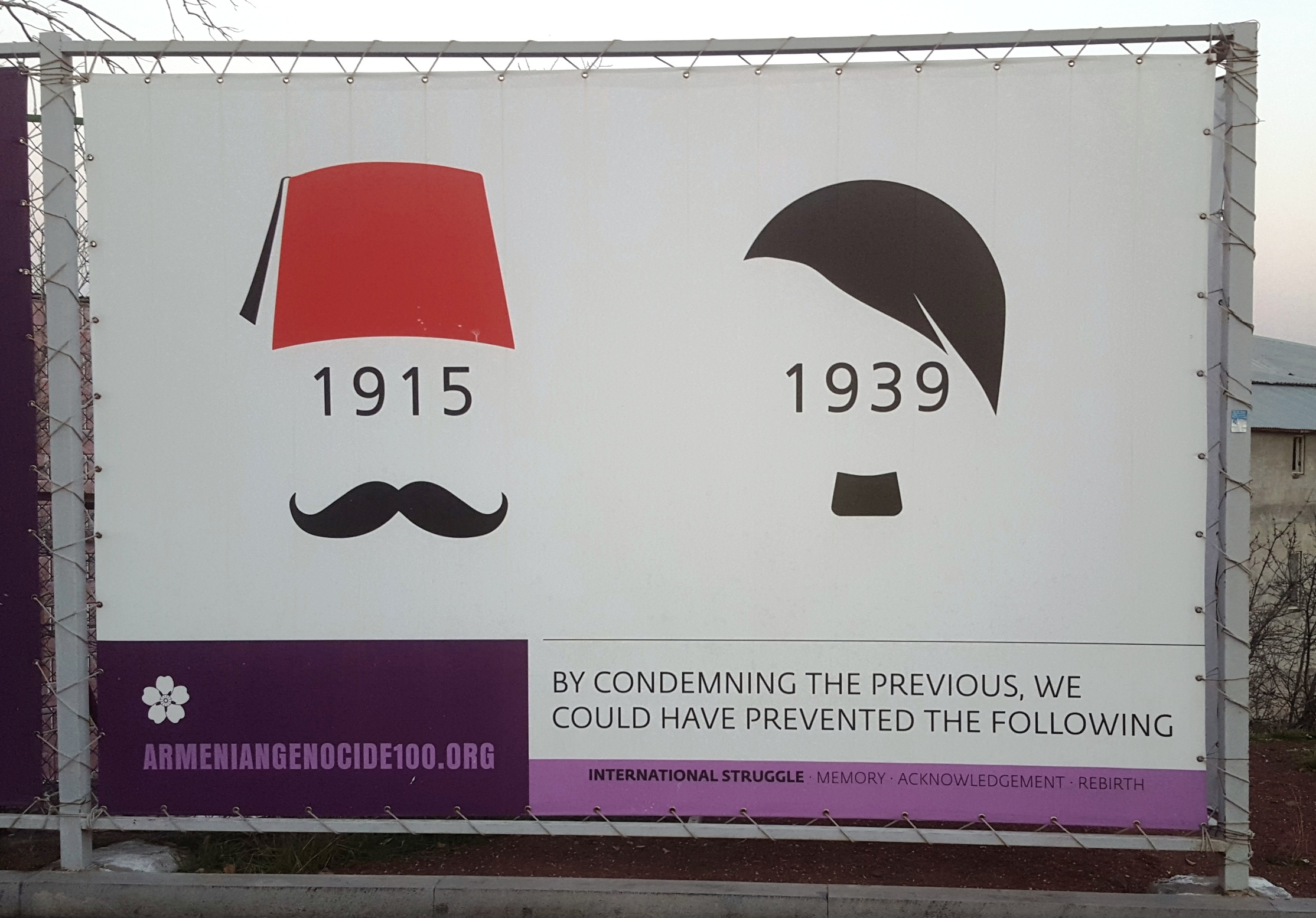
In contrast to this poster, Rieff argues that remembering past tragedies does not prevent future ones.

The book received several reviews.

South African historian Gary Baines described the book as "a major intervention in the debate about the relative merits of remembering and forgetting". Michael Ignatieff, writing in The Sunday Times, states that the book is "an astringent, eloquent and sometimes moving essay". Ignatieff, however, criticizes the book for giving no guidance on when it might be better to forget, a critique echoed by Baines. In International Affairs Caleb Lauer writes that Rieff fails to address the objection that forgetting "cannot provide a society with some blank canvas on which to conjure a new, best image of itself". Ultimately, Lauer concludes that the book is well written but "says very little. His main point is analogous to that of a media studies scholar who argues that propaganda is dangerous and journalism beneficial."

Rose Deller, in LSE Review of Books, is persuaded by the book's argument that there is no moral duty to remember, and she credits Rieff for articulating "the very real danger that the memory of past atrocities can fuel violence in the here and now". She describes the book as "a thought-provoking and often controversial exploration of what is gained and lost by remembering; yet, it is a work of moral philosophy that raises more questions than it answers". Will McGowan, in The British Journal of Criminology, calls the book a "provocative essay". He credits the book with originality, "relentless interdisciplinarity and fast-moving pace", and for drawing "on works of history, philosophy, sociology, literary fiction and poetry, and political science". However, McGowan anticipates that specialists would not agree with the broad-brush treatment of many current and historical issues. He "found the text an immensely thought-provoking read due to its eclectic content and essay format. It raises a range of controversial questions which force us to think through some of the disastrous implications collective memory can have and is, therefore, a success on its own terms."

The book sparked debates at Jewish Book Week and the International Center for Transitional Justice.
