= In America (novel) =

1999 novel by Susan Sontag

- The front cover is illustrated by the ca. 1862 photograph Woman Seen from the Back.
- Author: Susan Sontag
- Language: English
- Publication date: 1999
- Media type: Print (hardcover and paperback)

In America is a 1999 novel by Susan Sontag. It won the U.S. National Book Award for Fiction. It is based on the true story of Polish actress Helena Modjeska (called Maryna Zalewska in the book), her arrival in California in 1876, and her ascendancy to American stardom.

== Alleged plagiarism ==
Sontag was accused of plagiarism by Ellen Lee, who discovered at least twelve passages in the 387-page book that were similar to passages in four other books about Modjeska, including My Mortal Enemy, a novel by Willa Cather. (Cather wrote: "When Oswald asked her to propose a toast, she put out her long arm, lifted her glass, and looking into the blur of the candlelight with a grave face, said: 'To my coun-n-try!'" Sontag wrote, "When asked to propose a toast, she put out her long arm, lifted her glass, and looking into the blur of the candlelight, crooned, 'To my new country!'" "Country," muttered Miss Collingridge. "Not 'coun-n-try.'")

The quotations were presented without credit or attribution. Sontag said about using the passages, "All of us who deal with real characters in history transcribe and adopt original sources in the original domain. I've used these sources and I've completely transformed them. I have these books. I've looked at these books. There's a larger argument to be made that all of literature is a series of references and allusions."

== Reception ==
In America has been praised by literary critics. Publishers Weekly wrote, "As she did in The Volcano Lover, Sontag crafts a novel of ideas in which real figures from the past enact their lives against an assiduously researched, almost cinematically vivid background. Here again her signal achievement is to offer fresh and insightful commentary on the social and cultural currents of an age, with a distinctive understanding of how historical events forged character and destiny." Sarah Kerr of The New York Times gave the book modest praise, writing, "Almost but not quite as lively as in The Volcano Lover, Sontag's prose here is lithe, playful: in spite of the listless plot, this book has flow. Indeed, In America reads so smoothly that one could almost accuse Sontag of placing too few demands on her readers. Stimulating ideas, as usual, lurk around every corner. But they tend to arrive pre-interpreted." She added, "Sentence by sentence, scene to scene, the writing in In America is utterly nimble. It's the ideas, somehow, that lag behind."

John Sutherland of The Guardian was more critical, however, remarking, "Let's face it: if this was a first novel by a literary unknown it would have been lucky to make it into print. What makes In America an object of interest is less its page-turning readability than its significance as the latest move in Susan Sontag's brilliant career."
