= Susan Taubes =

American novelist

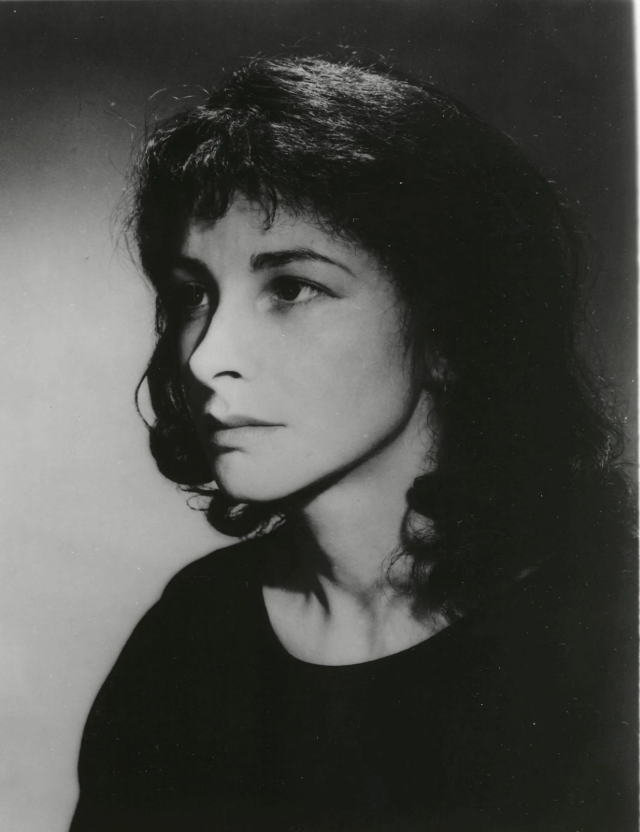
- Born: Judit Zsuzanna Feldmann; 12 January 1928; Budapest, Hungary
- Died: 6 November 1969 (aged 41); East Hampton, New York
- Cause of death: Drowning
- Education: Bryn Mawr College (BA); Harvard University (PhD)
- Occupations: Professor; Novelist
- Notable work: Divorcing (1969)
- Spouse: Jacob Taubes (m. 1949)

Susan Taubes (January 1928 – 6 November 1969) was a Hungarian-American writer and scholar. She is best known for her novel Divorcing, published shortly before her suicide in 1969.

== Life ==
=== Early life ===
Taubes was born Judit Zsuzanna Feldmann in Budapest, Hungary, into a Jewish family. Her mother was Marion Batory, and her father, Sándor Feldmann, was a psychoanalyst and member of Sándor Ferenczi's school; Feldmann and Ferenczi had a falling out in 1923. Taubes' grandfather, Mózes Feldmann, was the head of the Neolog branch of the divided Hungarian rabbinate in Pest.

Taubes' mother left Sándor for a new husband while she was still a child. The mother and daughter's relationship steadily deteriorated, never to recover. In a 1950 letter, Taubes expressed a desire to cut her mother off completely, describing her as "pitiful" and "neurotic," a theme that would appear in much of her later work.

In 1939, Taubes and her father emigrated to Rochester, New York, where she adopted the name Susan. She attended Bryn Mawr College as an undergraduate. There, she majored in philosophy and wrote an honors thesis on Martin Heidegger. In 1948, she met Jacob Taubes, a scholar and professor of religious studies born to a Jewish family from Vienna. The couple were married on 5 June 1949, when Taubes was 21. Despite her husband's devout Judaism, Taubes refused to engage in organized religion. Together the Taubeses had two children: Ethan, born in 1953, and Tanaquil, born in 1956.

After graduating with her Bachelor's 1951, Taubes continued her studies by taking classes at Sorbonne University in Paris and Hebrew University in Jerusalem. She eventually worked towards and earned a doctorate in religious studies from Harvard University. Her dissertation: The Absent God: A Study of Simone Weil, was supervised by Paul Tillich and completed in 1956.

=== Career ===
Starting in 1960, Taubes worked as a professor of religious studies at Columbia University and published on philosophy and religion. There, she curated the Bush Collection of Religion and Culture and edited volumes of Native American and African folktales. African Myths and Tales was published in 1963 by Dell Publishing under her maiden name. In 1961, after a tumultuous relationship, Susan and Jacob separated. Around the same time, she became involved with The Open Theatre and joined a group of female writers that conducted workshops on works in progress. The group included Elizabeth Hardwick and Renata Adler, and was led by the writer and critic Susan Sontag, who later called Taubes her "double."

During the 1960's, Taubes wrote the novel Divorcing, the novella Lament for Julia, and multiple short stories. Divorcing, published in 1969, was the only of her works to be published during her lifetime. Taubes committed suicide shortly after the novel’s publication by walking into the ocean off East Hampton; she was 41 years old. Her body was identified by Susan Sontag, who partially attributed Taubes' suicide to the poor reviews the novel received.

== Reception ==
The misogyny of the literary field during her lifetime caused Taubes suffering. The literary critic Hugh Kenner, reviewing her book Divorcing in the New York Times on November 2, 1969, dismissed her as one of the "lady novelists" and “a quick-change artist with the clothes of other writers.” Taubes drowned four days after Kenner's review was published, and a reappraisal of her work began. In 2003, the Leibniz Center for Literary and Cultural Research in Berlin, Germany, established an archive for Taubes's work, describing her life as a “story in which Jewish exile meets female intellectualism.” An intellectual biography of Taubes by Christina Pareigis was published in 2020, and the New York Review of Books reissued Divorcing the same year to appreciative reviews. In 2023, the New York Review of Books published Taubes’s novella Lament for Julia for the first time in addition to nine short stories. She left numerous literary texts, most of them unpublished, as well as years of correspondence with Jacob Taubes and other prominent figures of philosophy and religion. Most of this estate was discovered years after her death, and transferred to Berlin in 2001. Until 2023, it was kept at the Berlin-based Center for Literatury and Cultural Research (Leibniz-Zentrum für Literatur- und Kulturforschung). There, Sigrid Weigel, together with Christina Pareigis, worked on an edition of Taubes’ letters and prose works.

In 2024, Atlantic Magazine included Divorcing in its list of "The Great American Novels," describing it as a "rediscovered masterpiece, a raw, witty, and utterly original novel."
