= Summer in Baden-Baden =

Book by Soviet Jewish writer Leonid Tsypkin

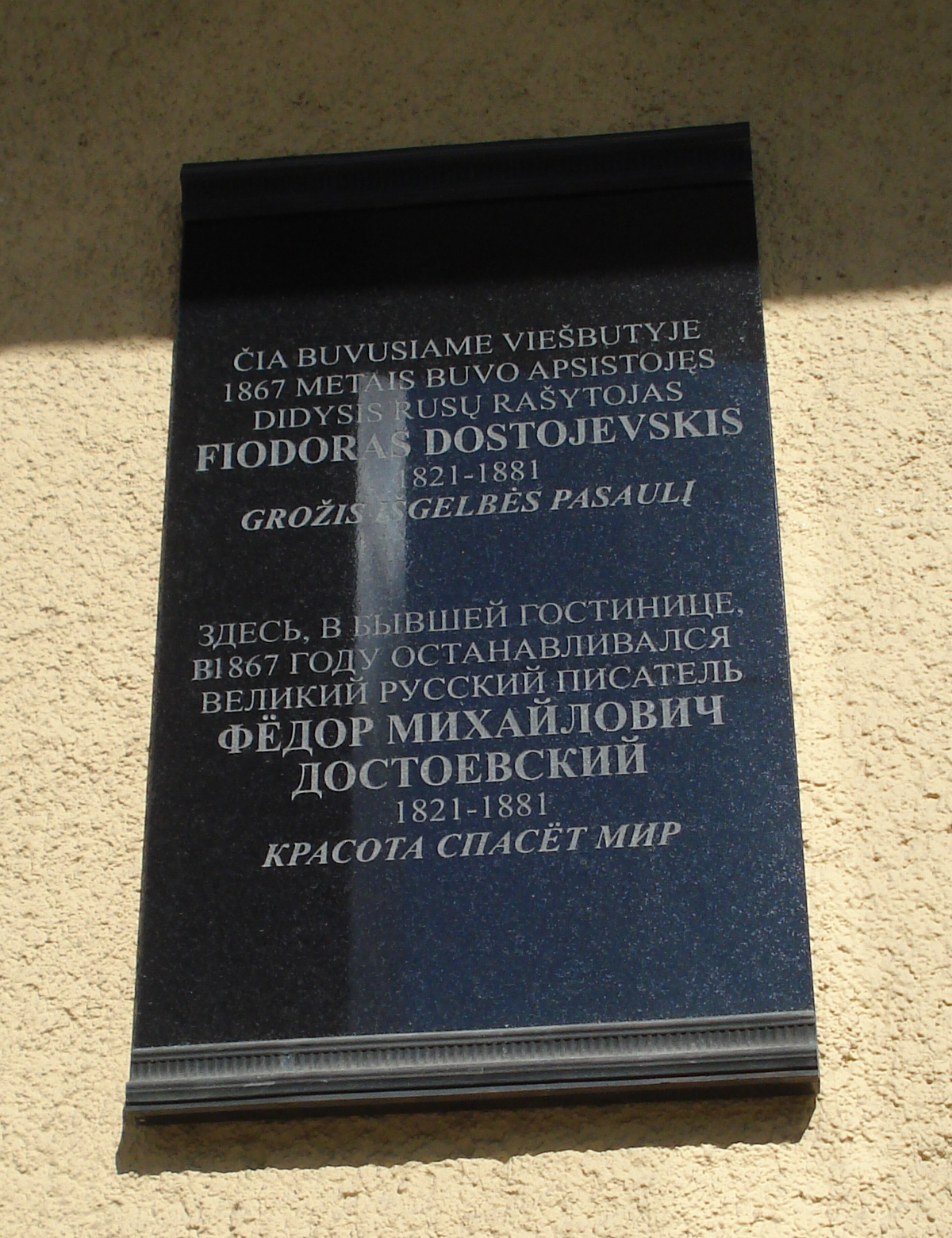
Plaque marking Dostoevsky's visit to Wilno

Summer in Baden-Baden (Лето в Бадене) is a book by Soviet Jewish writer Leonid Tsypkin about the Russian writer Fyodor Dostoevsky, especially his visit to the German resort Baden-Baden.

Summer in Baden-Baden is a fictional account of Dostoyevsky's stay in Germany with his wife Anna. Depictions of the Dostoyevskys' honeymoon and streaks of Fyodor's gambling mania are intercut with scenes of Fyodor's earlier life in a stream-of-consciousness style. Tsypkin knew virtually everything about Dostoyevsky, but although the details in the novel are correct, it is a work of fiction, not a biographical statement.

Tsypkin wrote the book between 1977 and 1981. It was first published in a Russian emigre magazine in the USA in March 1982, a week before his death.

An English translation by Roger and Angela Keys was published in 1987. It was republished in 2001 with a preface by Susan Sontag.
