= Daniel Stern (writer) =

American novelist (1928–2007)

- Stern in 1999
- Born: January 18, 1928
- Died: January 24, 2007 (aged 79)
- Occupation: Writer

Daniel Stern (January 18, 1928 – January 24, 2007) was an American novelist, and professor of English in the University of Houston creative writing program.

== Biography ==
Daniel Stern was raised on the Lower East Side and the Bronx in New York City.

Stern was talented and adept in many areas. Before starting his career as a writer, Stern was an accomplished cellist and promising composer. After graduating from the High School of Music and Art, he earned spots in the Indianapolis Symphony Orchestra and the Houston Symphony Orchestra and played with jazz giant Charlie Parker. He served as vice president at McCann-Erickson, Warner Bros., and CBS.

As a young writer, Stern and Bernard Malamud maintained a close friendship. Stern was a prolific and critically acclaimed writer. He published nine novels and three collections of short fiction and also served as the editor of Hampton Shorts. His work is celebrated for explorations of post-World War II Jewish-American life, formal experimentation in the novel, and for the innovation in the short story known as the "Twice Told Tale". His first collection of such stories, Twice Told Tales, was called a "powerful emotional experience" by Ronald Sanders of The Washington Post.

Although his novels and short stories are admired for their lyricism and experimentation, he only momentarily penetrated the mainstream with the novels Who Shall Live, Who Shall Die and The Suicide Academy (the first novel of the Wolf Walker trilogy). Publishers Weekly described him as "a writer's writer", and as such he remains something of a cult figure. Anaïs Nin devoted an essay to The Suicide Academy in her collection In Favor of the Sensitive Man.

He collected awards for his writing throughout his career, including the International Prix du Souvenir from the Bergen Belsen Society and the Government of France, the Rosenthal Award from the American Academy of Arts and Letters, two Pushcart Prizes, two O. Henry Prizes, and publication in Best American Short Stories.

Stern taught at Wesleyan, Pace, New York, and Harvard University. He taught in the creative writing program at the University of Houston from 1992 to 2006, where he was Cullen Distinguished Professor of English. He died of complications from heart surgery on January 24, 2007.

== Bibliography ==
=== Novels ===
- The Girl With the Glass Heart (1953)
- The Guests of Fame (1958)
- Miss America (1960)
- Who Shall Live, Who Shall Die (1963) Foreword by Elie Wiesel (1994)
- After the War (1965)
- The Suicide Academy (1968) Introduction by Anaïs Nin (1968)
- The Rose Rabbi (1971)
- Final Cut (1975)
- An Urban Affair (1980)

=== Collected short fiction ===
- Twice Told Tales (1989) Introduction by Sir Frank Kermode (1994)
- Twice Upon a Time (1992)
- One Day's Perfect Weather (1999)
- In the Country of the Young (2001)
- A Little Street Music (2004)

=== Uncollected short fiction ===
- The Oven Bird by Robert Frost: A Story (1995)
- Grievances and Griefs by Robert Frost: A Story (1995)
- The Advancer (2006)

=== Plays ===
- The Television Waiting Room. Read at Playwrights Horizons, New York, NY. 1984.

=== Archives ===
- Daniel Stern Papers at the Harry Ransom Center
