= The Way We Live Now (short story) =

1986 short story by Susan Sontag

"The Way We Live Now" is a short story by Susan Sontag which was published to great acclaim on November 24, 1986 in The New Yorker. The story describes the beginnings of the AIDS crisis in the early 1980s, as the disease began to claim members of the New York cultural elite.

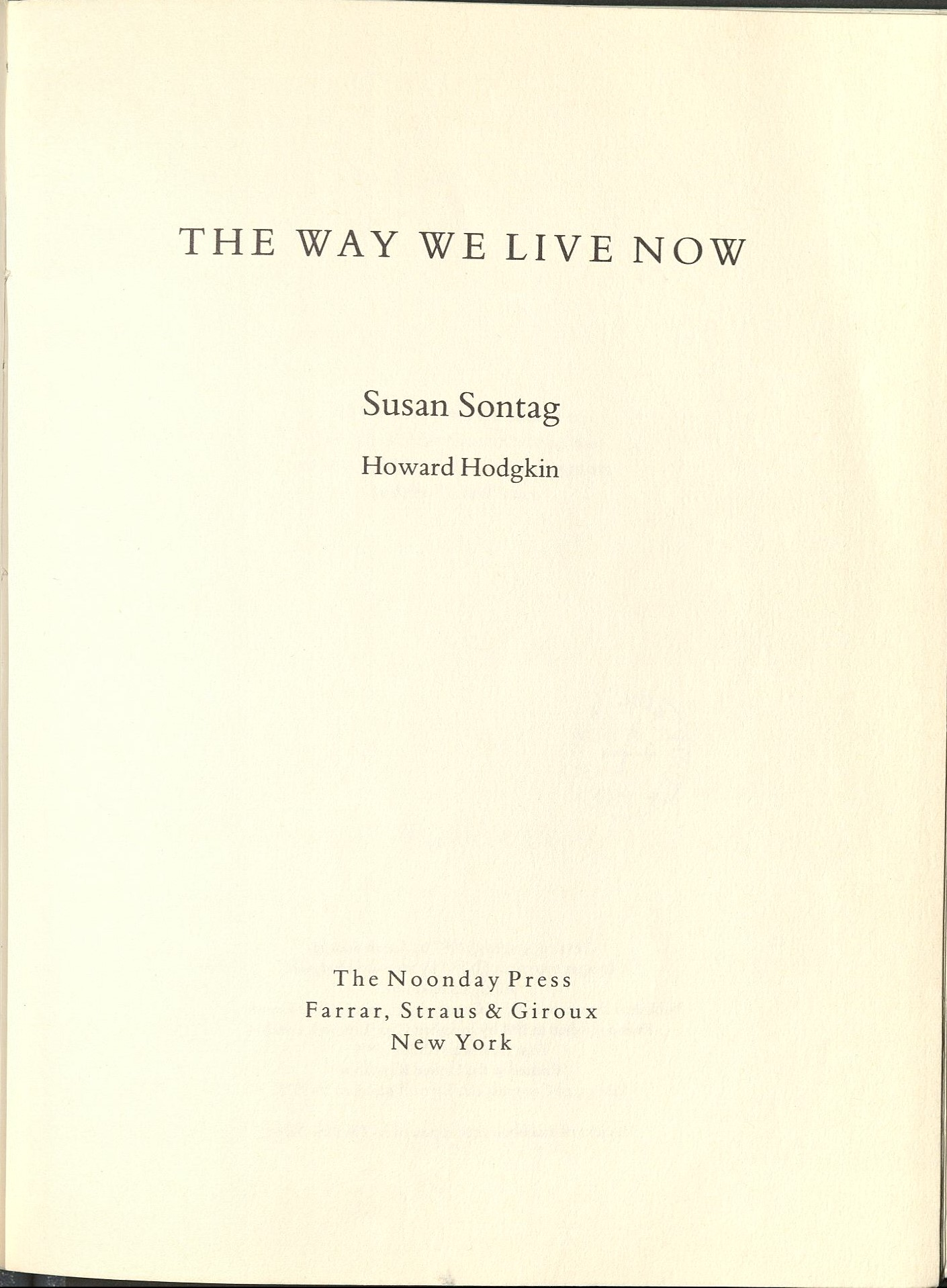
Pictures by Howard Hodgkin (1991)

The story is told entirely in the form of fragments of conversation, mentioned and whispered by numerous friends of an unnamed man who lies sick in a hospital bed. Although AIDS was new to many who read the story when it first appeared, "The Way We Live Now" remains a signature work in the literature of the epidemic.

Sontag borrowed her title from an 1875 novel by British writer Anthony Trollope titled The Way We Live Now.
