= The Incest Diary =

2017 memoir by an anonymous author

- Cover of the hardback edition
- Author: Anonymous
- Language: English
- Genre: Memoir
- Publisher: Farrar, Straus and Giroux (US); Bloomsbury (UK)
- Publication date: 18 July 2017
- Publication place: United States
- Media type: Print (hardcover)
- Pages: 144 p.
- ISBN: 978-0374175559

The Incest Diary is a 2017 memoir by an anonymous author detailing her incestuous and abusive relationship with her father.

== Synopsis ==
In non-linear vignettes, the author recalls how her father raped and abused her from ages 3 to 21. She describes her physical and emotional response, the damage the abuse has caused her interpersonal and familial relationships, and how she believes her trauma has psychosexually predisposed her to seeking relationships that mirror her relationship to her father.

The book uses sexually explicit language to create a narration style that is a "mixture of arousal and self-disgust and rage", a style that reflects the conflicting desire and repulsion she feels for her father.

== Critical reception ==
Writing for Vice, Lauren Oyler noted that early reactions to the book, such as those published in The Independent, Globe and Mail and Newsweek were "disappointingly conservative". H. C. Wilentz writes in The New Yorker that the book is "carefully wrought", and "the writing is often feverish", also noting that the critics of the book "pick apart the authors' methods and motives rather than engage with the thornier issues of taboo and transgression." In a review in The New York Times, Dwight Garner praised the prose in the book as "clear and urgent" commenting that the "book offers more sensation than perspective."
