= Where the Stress Falls =

Collection of essays by Susan Sontag

- Cover of the first edition
- Author: Susan Sontag
- Language: English
- Subject: Criticism
- Publisher: Farrar, Straus and Giroux
- Publication date: 2001
- Publication place: United States
- Media type: Print
- ISBN: 978-0312421311
- OCLC: 171772

Where the Stress Falls, published in 2001, is the last collection of essays published by Susan Sontag before her death in 2004. The essays vary between her experiences in the theater to book reviews.

== Contents ==
The 41 pieces in the book are divided into three sections as follows:

"Reading"

- "A Poet's Prose"
  Originally written as an introduction to Marina Tsvetaeva's Captive Spirit: Selected Prose (1983).
- "Where the Stress Falls"
  First appeared in 2001 in The New Yorker.
- "Afterlives: The Case of Machado de Assis"
  Originally written as the foreword to a reprinting of Machado de Assis's Epitaph of a Small Winner (1990).
- "A Mind in Mourning"
  First appeared in 2000 in The Times Literary Supplement.
- "The Wisdom Project"
  First appeared in 2001 in The New Republic.
- "Writing Itself: On Roland Barthes"
  Originally written as an introduction to A Barthes Reader, which Sontag edited (1982).
- "Walser's Voice"
  Originally written as a preface to Robert Walser's Selected Stories (1982).
- "Danilo Kis"
  Originally written as an introduction to Danilo Kiš's Homo Poeticus: Essays and Interviews, which Sontag edited (1995).
- "Gombrowicz's Ferdydurke"
  Originally written as a foreword to a new translation of Witold Gombrowicz's Ferdydurke (2000).
- "Pedro Paramo"
  Originally written as the foreword to a new translation of Juan Rulfo's Pedro Paramo (1994).
- "DQ"
  First published in Spanish translation in a National Tourist Board of Spain catalogue, "España: Todo bajo el sol," in 1985. It has never before appeared in English.
- "A Letter to Borges"
  Originally written on the tenth anniversary of Jorge Luis Borges's death and published in Spanish translation in the Buenos Aires daily Clarin, June 13, 1996. It has never before appeared in English.

"Seeing"

- "A Century of Cinema"
  Originally written for and published in German translation in Frankfurter Rundschau, December 30, 1995.
- "Novel into Film: Fassbinder's Berlin Alexanderplatz"
  First appeared in Vanity Fair, September 1983.
- "A Note on Bunraku"
  Originally a program note for performances of Bunraku puppet theatre at the Japan Society in New York City on March 12–19, 1983.
- "A Place for Fantasy"
  First appeared in House & Garden, February 1983.
- "The Pleasure of the Image"
  First appeared in Art in America, November 1987.
- "About Hodgkin"
  Originally written for Howard Hodgkin Paintings, the catalogue of an exhibition organized by the Modern Art Museum of Fort Worth in 1993, and subsequently seen at the Metropolitan Museum of Art in New York. It was first published in the United Kingdom by Thames & Hudson in 1995.
- "A Lexicon for Available Light"
  Appeared in Art in America, December 1983.
- "In Memory of Their Feelings"
  Originally written for the catalogue "Dancers on a Plane: Cage, Cunningham, Johns", which accompanied an exhibit at the Anthony d’Offay Gallery in London from October 31 to December 2, 1989.
- "Dancer and the Dance"
  First appeared in Vogue France, December 1986, in French translation and in English.
- "Lincoln Kirstein"
  Revision, done in 1997 for a publication by the New York City Ballet, of a tribute to Lincoln Kirstein written ten years earlier, on his eightieth birthday, which appeared in Vanity Fair, May 1987.
- "Wagner's Fluids"
  Program essay for a production of Tristan und Isolde staged by Jonathan Miller at the Los Angeles Opera in December 1987.
- "An Ecstasy of Lament"
  Originally the program essay for a production of Pelléas et Mélisande staged by Robert Wilson at the Salzburg Festival in July 1997.
- "One Hundred Years of Italian Photography"
  Originally written as the foreword to Italy: One Hundred Years of Photography (1988).
- "On Bellocq"
  Originally written as the introduction to a new edition of E. J. Bellocq's Storyville Portraits (1996).
- "Borland's Babies"
  Originally written as the preface to Polly Borland's The Babies (2001).
- "Certain Mapplethorpes"
  Originally written as the preface to Robert Mapplethorpe's Certain People: A Book of Portraits (1985).
- "A Photograph Is Not an Opinion. Or Is It?"
  Originally written as an accompanying text to Annie Leibovitz's Women (1999).

"There and Here"

- "Homage to Halliburton"
  First published in Oxford American, March/April 2001.
- "Singleness"
  One of a group of essays inspired by Jorge Luis Borges's "Borges y yo," collected in Who's Writing This?, ed. Daniel Halpern (1995).
- "Writing As Reading"
  First appeared as a contribution to the series "Writers on Writing" in The New York Times on December 18, 2000.
- "Thirty Years Later"
  Originally written as the preface to a new edition of the Spanish translation of Against Interpretation. It was first published in English in The Threepenny Review (Summer 1996).
- "Questions of Travel"
  First appeared in The Times Literary Supplement, June 22, 1984.
- "The Idea of Europe (One More Elegy)"
  Started as a talk delivered at a conference on Europe held in Berlin in late May 1988. It has never before appeared in English.
- "The Very Comical Lament of Pyramus and Thisbe (An Interlude)"
  Originally written for the catalogue of an art exhibition in Berlin and first published there, in German translation, in Die Endlichkeit der Freiheit Berlin, ed. Wulf Herzogenrath, Joachim Sartorius, and Christoph Tannert (1990). It appeared in English in The New Yorker, March 4, 1991.
- "Answers to a Questionnaire"
  Originally written in July 1997, in response to a questionnaire sent by French literary quarterly La Règle du jeu. It was published, in French, in "Enquête: Que peuvent les intellectuels? 36 écrivains répondent, La Règle du jeu, n.s. 21 (1998), and has never before appeared in English.
- "Waiting for Godot in Sarajevo"
  First published in The New York Review of Books, October 21, 1993.
- "'There' and 'Here'"
  First appeared in The Nation, December 25, 1995.
- "Joseph Brodsky"
  Originally written as the afterword to Mikhail Lemkhin's Joseph Brodsky/Leningrad Fragments (1997).
- "On Being Translated"
  A speech given in November 1995 at a conference on translation held at Columbia University and organized by Francesco Pellizzi, the editor of RES. It was printed in RES 32 (Autumn 1997).

== Reception ==
Where the Stress Falls has been praised by literary critics. Publishers Weekly lauded Sontag as "first and foremost an essayist" and wrote, "Sontag's appetite for trends and achievements is still so fierce, and she switches subjects so quickly and lithely, that if one short essay does not convince, the next one probably will." The book was also praised by P. D. Smith of The Guardian, who wrote, "An eclectic volume, it is unified by Sontag's tireless interrogation of the aesthetic impulse and by her passion for ideas, culture and especially for writing."

Conversely, the collection was heavily criticized by William Deresiewicz of The New York Times, who opined, "While Where the Stress Falls won't do much to enhance her stature as a thinker, never before has she made such large claims for her moral pre-eminence, her exemplary fulfillment of the intellectual's mission as society's conscience. In effect, she's the first person in a long while to nominate herself so publicly for sainthood." He added:

Its 41 pieces, which cover a wide variety of writers and visual and theatrical artists, are mostly brief -- appreciations, elegies, reflections -- and mostly occasional: prefaces, catalog copy, talks. This is connoisseurial prose, not sustained argumentation. But a belletrist Sontag has never been; a few of these pieces are quite fine, but most reproduce the faults of her earlier essays while eschewing their virtues. Still there the opacities and self-contradictions, the verbal infelicities, the thundering announcements of the obvious or dubious. Gone the analytic energy, the synthesizing reach, the lightning insight. Trying to sound lyrical, she merely sounds silly.
