= Two Fables =

1986 collection of two short stories by Roald Dahl

- First editions
- Author: Roald Dahl
- Cover artist: Bet Ayer
- Language: English
- Publisher: Viking
- Publication date: 1986
- Publication place: United Kingdom
- Media type: Print (hardback)
- Pages: 64 p.
- ISBN: 978-0-670-81530-2
- OCLC: 230987654
- Dewey Decimal: 823/.914[F]
- LC Class: PR6054.A35

Two Fables is a collection of two short stories by Roald Dahl, first published in 1986 by Viking in England and in 1987 by Farrar, Straus, & Giroux in the United States.

It contains the following two stories:

- "Princess and the Poacher"
- "Princess Mammalia"
