= Leonid Tsypkin =

Soviet author and medical doctor

Leonid Borisovich Tsypkin (Леонид Борисович Цыпкин) (March 20, 1926 – March 20, 1982) was a Soviet writer and medical doctor, best known for his book Summer in Baden-Baden.

== Early life ==
Tsypkin was born in Minsk, Soviet Union (now the capital of Belarus), to Russian-Jewish parents, "both of whom were medical specialists." "At the start of Stalin's Great Terror, in 1934, Tsypkin's father, Boris, an orthopaedic surgeon, was arrested on trumped-up charges, but was later released after a suicide attempt in which he broke his back." "Two of Boris Tsypkin's sisters and a brother were also arrested, and were murdered by Stalin's NKVD."

His family suffered further during the German invasion in 1941. "Boris Tsypkin's mother, another of his sisters and two nephews, perished in the ghetto." With the help of a farmer who was his patient Boris Tsypkin escaped from Minsk with his wife and eleven-year-old son Leonid."

== Career ==
"When the war was over Leonid returned with his parents to Minsk, where Leonid graduated from medical school in 1947; despite Stalin's policies of anti-Semitism, Tsypkin became a noted researcher in polio and cancer, and published more than 100 papers in scientific journals in Russia and abroad." While practicing medicine, Tsypkin "considered abandoning medicine to become a writer [and in] his early years he had produced some poetry and fiction, but in 1969, after winning a Doctor of Science degree, he was granted a salary increase, which freed him from part-time work and thus allowed him to get down to writing in earnest." "Over the following decade he wrote sketches and stories, and two autobiographical novellas, none of which was published in his lifetime."

After his son and daughter-in-law emigrated to America in 1977, Tsypkin was demoted to the post of junior medical researcher. He and his family were denied permission to leave the Soviet Union on two occasions, in 1979 and 1981. Tsypkin died at the age of 56 of a heart attack in Moscow.

Summer in Baden-Baden is a fictional account of Fyodor Dostoyevsky's stay in Germany with his wife Anna. Depictions of the Dostoyevskys' honeymoon and streaks of Fyodor's gambling mania are intercut with scenes of Fyodor's earlier life in a stream-of-consciousness style. Tsypkin knew virtually everything about Dostoyevsky, but although the details in the novel are correct, it is a work of fiction, not a biographical statement.

While Baden-Baden was perhaps Tsypkin's first significant work, at least in the West, his reputation was arguably sealed by the novella Norartakir. The story deals with themes of revenge, some of which, perhaps even all, being metaphorical acts by the author against the Soviet system.

== Bibliography ==
- Summer in Baden Baden, translated by Roger and Angela Keys, Hamish Hamilton, 285pp.
- "The Bridge Over the Neroch: And Other Works", translated by Jamey Gambrell, New Directions, 346pp.
