= Selected Poems (Pinsky collection) =

2011 collection of poems by Robert Pinsky

- Author: Robert Pinsky
- Language: English
- Genre: Poetry
- Publisher: Farrar, Straus and Giroux
- Publication date: 2011, 2012
- Publication place: United States
- Media type: Print (hardback & paperback)

Selected Poems is a collection of poems by American poet Robert Pinsky, selected and edited by America's 39th Poet Laureate Consultant in Poetry to the Library of Congress.

The first hardback edition was published by Farrar, Straus and Giroux in 2011; the first paperback edition was published by Farrar, Straus and Giroux in 2012.
