= David Rieff =

American writer and policy analyst (born 1952)

David Sontag Rieff
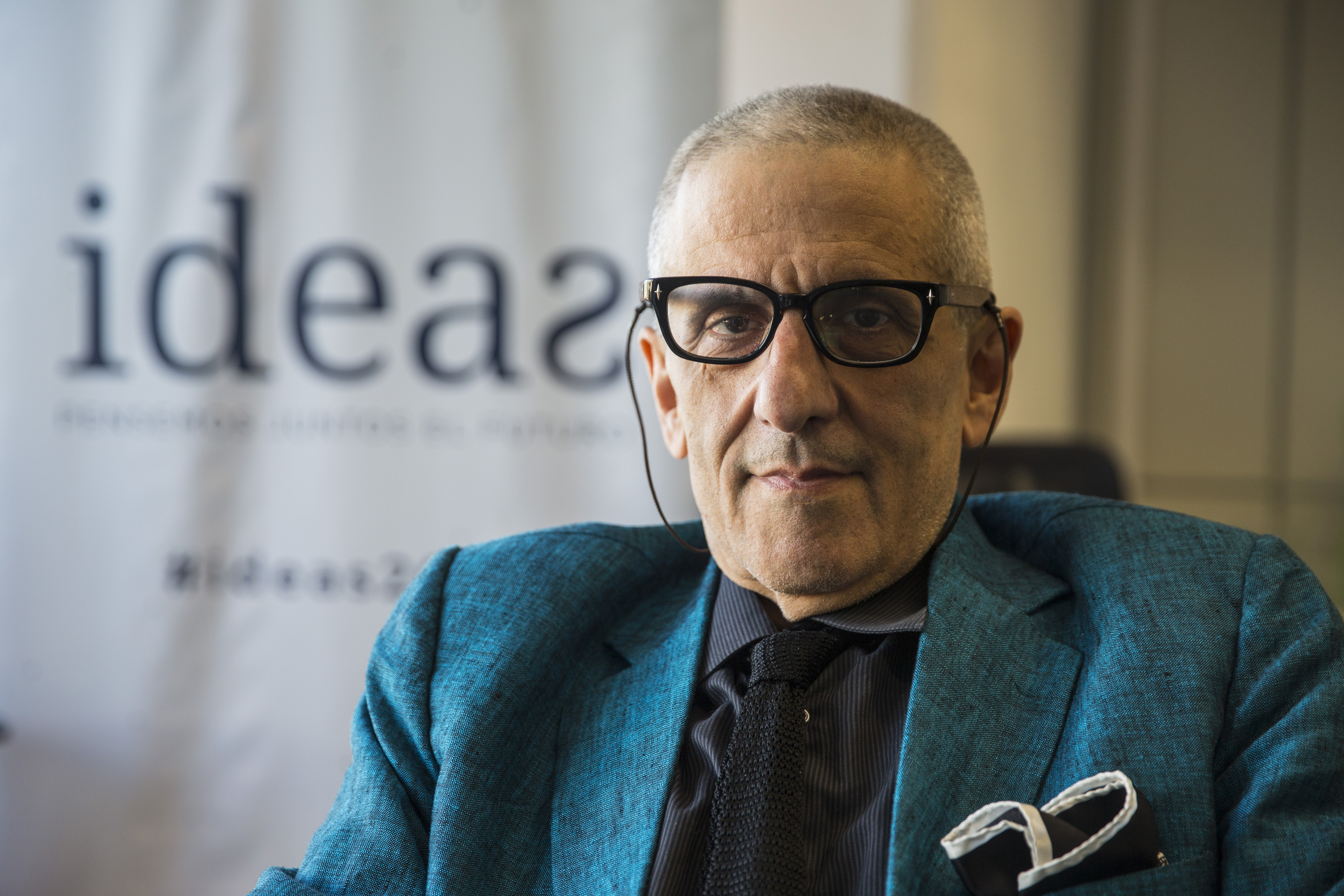
- Rieff in 2017
- Born: September 28, 1952 (age 74)
- Education: Lycée Français de New York
- Alma mater: Amherst College; Princeton University
- Occupations: Non-fiction writer, policy analyst
- Children: 1
- Parents: Philip Rieff (father); Susan Sontag (mother)

David Rieff (/ˈriːf/; born September 28, 1952) is an American nonfiction writer and policy analyst. His books have focused on issues of immigration, international conflict, and humanitarianism.

== Biography ==
Rieff is the only child of Susan Sontag, who was 19 years old when he was born. His father, whom Sontag divorced, was Philip Rieff, author of Freud: The Mind of the Moralist. Rieff was educated at the New Lincoln School, Lycée Français de New York and attended Amherst College as a member of the class of 1974, where he studied under Benjamin DeMott. He completed college at Princeton University, graduating with an A.B. in history in 1978.

== Career ==
Rieff was a senior editor at Farrar, Straus and Giroux from 1978 to 1989. Rieff has at various times been a senior fellow at the World Policy Institute at the New School for Social Research, a fellow at the New York Institute for the Humanities at New York University, a board member of the Arms Division of Human Rights Watch, of the Central Eurasia Project of the Open Society Institute, and of Independent Diplomat.

Rieff has published articles in newspapers and journals including The New York Times, the Los Angeles Times, The Washington Post, The Wall Street Journal, Le Monde, El País, The New Republic, World Affairs, Harper's, The Atlantic Monthly, Foreign Affairs, and The Nation.

Rieff has written about the Bosnian War. Despite his initial support of the tenets of Liberal internationalism, he was critical of American policies and goals in the Iraq War. His 2016 article in The Guardian, "The cult of memory: when history does more harm than good"—which argues that some mass atrocities are better forgotten—sparked a debate at the International Center for Transitional Justice.

== Reception ==
Peter Rose, reviewing Rieff's 2008 book Swimming in a Sea of Death: A Son's Memoir, compares it favorably to Simone de Beauvoir's 1964 A Very Easy Death; he considers the latter "perhaps the finest of filial memoirs."

G. John Ikenberry, reviewing Rieff's 2005 book At the Point of a Gun: Democratic Dreams and Armed Intervention for Foreign Affairs, called him "one of the most engaging observers of war and humanitarian emergencies in such troubled places as Bosnia, Kosovo, Afghanistan, and Iraq". He notes Rieff's "caution and misgivings", and finds especially compelling the essay where Rieff laments the gap between the misery and violence "outside the gates of the Western world" and the obstacles that prevent the West from assembling the strength, whether military or moral, to resolve the problems.

== Personal life ==
Rieff has a daughter, born in 2006.

== Books ==
- Texas Boots (with Sharon Delano) (Studio/Penguin, 1981)
- Going to Miami: Tourists, Exiles and Refugees in the New America (Little, Brown, 1987)
- Los Angeles: Capital of the Third World (Simon & Schuster, 1991)
- The Exile: Cuba in the Heart of Miami (Simon & Schuster, 1993)
- Slaughterhouse: Bosnia and the Failure of the West (Simon & Schuster, 1995)
- Crimes of War: What the Public Should Know (co-editor, with Roy Gutman) (W. W. Norton, 1999)
- A Bed for the Night: Humanitarianism in Crisis (Simon & Schuster, 2003)
- At the Point of a Gun: Democratic Dreams and Armed Intervention (Simon & Schuster, 2005)
- Swimming in a Sea of Death: A Son's Memoir (Simon & Schuster, 2008)
- Reborn: Journals & Notebooks 1947-1963 (editor) (Farrar, Straus and Giroux, 2009)
- Against Remembrance (Melbourne University Press. 2011)
- As Consciousness Is Harnessed To Flesh: Journals & Notebooks 1964-1980 (editor) (Farrar, Straus and Giroux, 2012)
- The Reproach of Hunger (Simon & Schuster, 2015)
- In Praise of Forgetting: Historical Memory and Its Ironies (Yale University Press, 2016)
- On Women (editor) (Picador, 2023)
- Desire and Fate (Columbia University Press, 2025)
- Robert Oppenheimer: The Sphinx Without a Secret (Yale University Press, 2026)
