= I, etcetera =

1978 short story collection by Susan Sontag

- First edition
- Author: Susan Sontag
- Language: English
- Genre: Short stories
- Publisher: Farrar, Straus and Giroux
- Publication date: 1978
- Publication place: United States
- Pages: 246
- ISBN: 978-0374174026

I, etcetera is a 1978 collection of short stories by Susan Sontag.

== Contents ==
- "Project for a Trip to China"
- "Debriefing"
- "American Spirits"
- "The Dummy"
- "Old Complaints Revisited"
- "Baby"
- "Doctor Jekyll"
- "Unguided Tour"

== Reviews ==
Kirkus Reviews called the eight stories varied and often effective in their darkly ironic turns, though not for every reader. It found two of the weaker pieces overly thematic, praised others for the personal pain beneath experimental forms, and concluded they are “wiry, allusive, and too smart for their own good—read them anyway.”

Another review, by Benjamin Taylor, appeared in The Georgia Review in its 1980 Winter edition named " Centered Voice: Susan Sontag's Short Fiction".

== Editions ==
- ISBN 0-374-17402-4 (New York: Farrar Straus Giraux, hardcover, 1978)
- ISBN 0-312-42010-2 (New York: Picador, trade paperback, 2002)
