= Jacob Taubes =

Austrian sociologist of religion, philosopher and scholar of Judaism (1923-1987)

- Born: 25 February 1923; Vienna, Austria
- Died: 21 March 1987 (aged 64); Berlin, Germany

Philosophical work
- Era: 20th-century philosophy
- Region: Western philosophy

Jacob Taubes (25 February 1923 – 21 March 1987) was a sociologist of religion, philosopher, and scholar of Judaism.

Taubes was born into an old rabbinical family. He was married to the writer Susan Taubes. He obtained his doctorate in 1947 for a thesis on "Occidental Eschatology" and initially taught religious studies and Jewish studies in the United States at Harvard, Columbia and Princeton University.

From 1965 he was professor of Jewish studies and hermeneutics at the Free University of Berlin. He has influenced many contemporary thinkers such as Giorgio Agamben, Susan Sontag, Avital Ronell, Marshall Berman, Babette Babich, Aleida and Jan Assmann, Amos Funkenstein and Peter Sloterdijk.

== Works ==
- Abendländische Eschatologie, A. Francke, 1947.
- The Political Theology of Paul: Lectures, Held at the Protestant Institute for Interdisciplinary Research (FEST) in Heidelberg, February 23–27, 1987, Stanford University Press, 2004.
- From Cult to Culture: Fragments Toward a Critique of Historical Reason, Stanford University Press, 2010.
- To Carl Schmitt: Letters and Reflections, Columbia University Press, 2013.
- Apokalypse und Politik: Aufsätze, Kritiken und kleinere Schriften, Brill Deutschland, 2017.
