= The Volcano Lover =

1992 novel by Susan Sontag

- Author: Susan Sontag
- Language: English
- Publisher: Farrar, Straus and Giroux
- Publication date: 1992
- Publication place: United States
- Media type: Print
- Pages: 419 pp
- ISBN: 978-0-374-28516-6
- OCLC: 25874591

The Volcano Lover is a historical novel by Susan Sontag, published in 1992. Set largely in Naples, it focuses upon Sir William Hamilton, his marriages to Catherine and to Emma, and the scandal relating to Emma's affair with Lord Nelson, her abandonment, and her descent into poverty. The title comes from William Hamilton's interest in volcanoes, and his investigations of Mount Vesuvius. The novel concludes with a coda featuring deathbed meditations from the perspectives of Hamilton and of four women characters. Sontag declared in an interview with The Paris Review that "the last word should be given to someone who speaks for victims."

== Reception ==
The Volcano Lover has largely been praised by literary critics. Lettie Ransley of The Guardian called it "as big, rich and complex as one might expect" and wrote,

The Volcano Lover is a powerful, intricate novel of ideas: frequently inflected with Sontag's feminism, it applies a modern lens to the Enlightenment's moral, social and aesthetic concerns. Yet it is also a tender inventory of desire: intricately mapping the modulation from the cold mania of the collector to the lover's passion.

The writer John Banville praised the work, noting that Sontag's decision to write a romantic historical novel was "a surprise." He remarked, "The Volcano Lover, despite a few nods of acknowledgment toward post-modernist self-awareness, is a big, old-fashioned broth of a book. Sir Walter Scott would surely have approved of it; in fact, he would probably have enjoyed it immensely."

Candia McWilliam of The Independent lauded the book, opining:

In The Volcano Lover height and control are buoyed up by clear thinking; although it descants, sometimes at essay length, upon abstractions, there is no 'cabinet of curiosities' disjunction between rumination and fiction such as decks so many modern novels in fustian. Sontag embroils the reader in her greater themes through the truth and tact of her depiction of smaller, no less preoccupying events.

The novel was also praised by Michiko Kakutani of The New York Times.
