= Illness as Metaphor =

1978 work of critical theory by Susan Sontag

- Author: Susan Sontag
- Language: English
- Subject: cancer; tuberculosis; disease; social stigma; metaphor
- Publisher: Farrar, Straus & Giroux
- Publication date: 1978
- Publication place: United States
- Pages: 87
- ISBN: 978-0-374-17443-9
- OCLC: 299370676
- Dewey Decimal: 809.9
- Followed by: AIDS and Its Metaphors

Illness as Metaphor is a 1978 work of critical theory by Susan Sontag, in which she challenged the victim-blaming in the language that is often used to describe diseases and the people affected by them.

Teasing out the similarities between public perspectives on cancer (the paradigmatic disease of the 20th century before the appearance of AIDS), and tuberculosis (the symbolic illness of the 19th century), Sontag showed that both diseases were popularly associated with personal psychological traits. In particular, she said that the metaphors and terms used to describe both syndromes lead to an association between repressed passion and the physical disease itself. She wrote about the peculiar reversal that "With the modern diseases (once TB, now cancer), the romantic idea that the disease expresses the character is invariably extended to assert that the character causes the disease—because it has not expressed itself. Passion moves inward, striking and blighting the deepest cellular recesses."

Sontag said that the clearest and most truthful way of thinking about diseases is without recourse to metaphor. She believed that wrapping disease in metaphors discouraged, silenced, and shamed patients. Some other writers have disagreed with her, saying that metaphors and other symbolic language help some affected people form meaning out of their experiences.

== Synopsis ==
In Illness as Metaphor, Susan Sontag critiques the use of metaphors in order to refer to illnesses, with her main focuses being tuberculosis and cancer. The book contrasts the viewpoints and metaphors associated with each disease. At one point, tuberculosis was seen as a creative disease, leading to healthy people wanting to look as if they were ill with the disease. However, lack of improvement from tuberculosis was usually seen as lack of passion in the individual. Tuberculosis was even seen as a sign of punishment by some religions, such as Christianity, leading the afflicted to believe that they deserved their ailment.

Sontag then made the comparison between the metaphors used to describe tuberculosis and cancer, with cancer being seen in the 1970s as a disease that afflicted people who lacked passion and sensuality, and those who repressed their feelings. Sontag wrote that multiple studies found a link between depression and cancer, which she argued was just a sign of the times and not a reason for the disease, since in previous times physicians found that cancer patients suffered from hyperactivity and hypersensitivity, which were signs of their times.

In the last chapter, Sontag argued that society's disease metaphors cause patients to feel as if society were against them. Her final argument was that metaphors are not useful for patients, since metaphors make patients feel as if their illness was due to their feelings, rather than lack of effective treatment. The most effective way of thinking about illness would be to avoid metaphorical thinking, and to focus on only the physical components and treatment.

== Context ==
Sontag wrote the treatise while being treated for breast cancer. She does not mention her personal experience with cancer in the work, but she addresses it in her related 1988 work, AIDS and Its Metaphors.

At the time that Sontag was writing, the fad in alternative cancer treatment was psychotherapy for the patient's supposed "cancer personality". According to these proponents, patients brought cancer upon themselves by having a resigned, repressed, inhibited personality (which contrasted with the tuberculosis patient, who was seen as passionate and creative). By undergoing the often blame-filled psychotherapy offered by some groups, such as the Simonton Center, the patient would overcome cancer by consciously choosing to give up the emotional benefits he or she created the cancer for, and be healed. Others have taken her idea further, showing not that there is a real "cancer" behind the metaphors, but that all we have is metaphor—even in science—to understand the behavior of a disease that remains mysterious.

== Publication ==
The work was originally published as three long essays in the New York Review of Books. Some of the more inflammatory language was slightly toned down for republication. For example, what Sontag originally called the "inimitable looniness" of Wilhelm Reich's language was softened to the "inimitable coherence".

== Reception ==
While one of Sontag's widest read and most celebrated works, Illness as Metaphor received mixed reviews. Kirkus Reviews called it "a small, liberating book that could become the cancer patient's Common Sense."

The literary critic Denis Donoghue of The New York Times gave the book a negative review, describing it as "a deeply personal book pretending for the sake of decency to be a thesis." He added:

As an argument, it seems to me strident, unconvincing as it stands, a prosecutor's brief that admits nothing in defense or mitigation. The brief is too brief to be just. So the reader is left with a case not fully made but points acutely established; enough, at any rate, to make him feel not only that he must in future watch his language but, with the same vigilance, watch his attitudes, prejudices, spontaneities.

The literary critic and frequent Sontag detractor Camille Paglia described the book as "clumsy and ponderous, like a graduate-school seminar paper."

== Sources ==
- Olson, James Stuart (2002). Bathsheba's Breast: Women, Cancer and History. Baltimore: The Johns Hopkins University Press. ISBN 0-8018-6936-6.
