= Under the Sign of Saturn =

1980 collection of essays by Susan Sontag

- Cover of the first edition
- Author: Susan Sontag
- Language: English
- Subject: Criticism
- Publisher: Farrar, Straus and Giroux
- Publication date: 1980
- Publication place: United States
- Media type: Print
- Pages: 224
- ISBN: 978-0312420086

Under the Sign of Saturn is a collection of essays by Susan Sontag published in 1980. All of the essays originally appeared, in a different or abridged form, in The New York Review of Books except for "Approaching Artaud," which first appeared in The New Yorker.

== Contents ==
- "On Paul Goodman" (1972)
- "Approaching Artaud" (1973)
- "Fascinating Fascism" (1974)
- "Under the Sign of Saturn" (1978)
- "Syberberg's Hitler" (1979)
- "Remembering Barthes" (1980)
- "Mind as Passion" (1980)

== Reception ==
David Bromwich of The New York Times wrote:

Susan Sontag's third book of essays has meditations on Antonin Artaud, Elias Canetti, Leni Riefenstahl, Walter Benjamin and Hans-Jurgen Syberberg's film about Hitler, along with brief eulogies for Paul Goodman and Roland Barthes. Her subjects bear witness to Miss Sontag's range as well as her diligence. She keeps up - appears, at times, to do the keeping-up for a whole generation - and has long been an effective publicist for the more imposing European offshoots of high modernism. The theater of cruelty, the death of "the author": From ground to summit, from oblivion to oblivion, she covers the big movements and ideas and then sends out her report, not without qualms.
