= Susan Sontag =

American writer, critic and public intellectual (1933–2004)

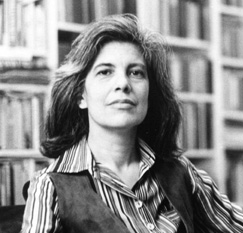
- Sontag in 1979
- Born: Susan Lee Rosenblatt; January 16, 1933; New York City, New York, U.S.
- Died: December 28, 2004 (aged 71); New York City, New York, U.S.
- Resting place: Montparnasse Cemetery, Paris, France
- Education: University of California, Berkeley; University of Chicago (BA); Harvard University (MA)
- Occupations: Essayist; novelist; filmmaker
- Years active: 1959–2004
- Notable work: Against Interpretation (1966); On Photography (1977); Illness as Metaphor (1978); Regarding the Pain of Others (2003)
- Spouse: Philip Rieff (m. 1950; div. 1959)
- Partner(s): María Irene Fornés (1959–1963); Annie Leibovitz (1989–2004)
- Children: David Rieff
- Website: www.susansontag.com

Susan Lee Sontag (/ˈsɒntæɡ/; January 16, 1933 – December 28, 2004) was an American writer and critic. She primarily wrote essays, but also published novels; she published her first major work, the essay "Notes on 'Camp' ", in 1964. Her best-known works include the critical works Against Interpretation (1966), On Photography (1977), Illness as Metaphor (1978) and Regarding the Pain of Others (2003), the short story "The Way We Live Now" (1986) and the novels The Volcano Lover (1992) and In America (1999).

Sontag was active in writing and speaking about, or traveling to, areas of conflict, including during the Vietnam War and the Siege of Sarajevo. She wrote extensively about literature, cinema, photography and media, illness, war, human rights, and left-wing politics. Her essays and speeches drew backlash and controversy, and she has been called "one of the most influential critics of her generation".

== Early life and education ==
Sontag was born Susan Rosenblatt in New York City, the daughter of Mildred (née Jacobson) and Jack Rosenblatt, both Jews of Lithuanian and Polish descent. Her father managed a fur trading business in Tianjin, China, where he died of tuberculosis in 1939, when Susan was five years old. Seven years later, Sontag's mother married U.S. Army Captain Nathan Sontag. Susan and her sister, Judith, took their stepfather's surname, although he did not adopt them formally. Sontag did not have a religious upbringing and said she had not entered a synagogue until her mid-20s.

Remembering an unhappy childhood, with a cold, alcoholic, distant mother who was "always away", Sontag lived on Long Island, New York, then in Tucson, Arizona, and later in the San Fernando Valley in southern California, where she took refuge in books and graduated from North Hollywood High School at the age of 15. She began her undergraduate studies at the University of California, Berkeley but transferred to the University of Chicago in admiration of its prominent core curriculum. At Chicago, she undertook studies in philosophy, ancient history, and literature alongside her other requirements. Leo Strauss, Joseph Schwab, Christian Mackauer, Richard McKeon, Peter von Blanckenhagen, and Kenneth Burke were among her lecturers. She graduated at age 18 with an A.B. and was elected to Phi Beta Kappa. While at Chicago, she became close friends with fellow student Mike Nichols. In 1951, her work appeared in print for the first time in the winter issue of the Chicago Review.

At 17, Sontag married writer Philip Rieff, a sociology instructor at the University of Chicago, after a 10-day courtship; their marriage lasted eight years. While studying at Chicago, Sontag attended a summer school taught by the sociologist Hans Gerth, who became a friend and influenced her study of German thinkers. Upon completing her Chicago degree, Sontag taught freshman English at the University of Connecticut for the 1952–53 academic year. She attended Harvard University for graduate school, initially studying literature with Perry Miller and Harry Levin before moving into philosophy and theology under Paul Tillich, Jacob Taubes, Raphael Demos, and Morton White.

After completing her Master of Arts in philosophy, Sontag began doctoral research in metaphysics, ethics, Greek philosophy, Continental philosophy, and theology at Harvard. The philosopher Herbert Marcuse lived with Sontag and Rieff for a year while working on his 1955 book Eros and Civilization. Sontag researched for Rieff's 1959 study Freud: The Mind of the Moralist before their divorce in 1958, and contributed to the book to such an extent that she has been considered an unofficial co-author. The couple had a son, David Rieff, who went on to be his mother's editor at Farrar, Straus and Giroux, as well as a writer in his own right. According to Sontag's biographer Benjamin Moser, Sontag was the true author of the text on Freud, which she wrote after David's birth, and in the separation the latter was the subject of an exchange: she handed over the authorship of the book to Rieff, he gave her their son.

Sontag was awarded an American Association of University Women's fellowship for the 1957–58 academic year to St Anne's College, Oxford, where she traveled without her husband and son. There, she had classes with Iris Murdoch, Stuart Hampshire, A. J. Ayer, and H. L. A. Hart while also attending the B. Phil seminars of J. L. Austin and the lectures of Isaiah Berlin. But Oxford did not appeal to her, and she transferred after Michaelmas term of 1957 to the University of Paris (the Sorbonne). In Paris, Sontag socialized with expatriate artists and academics including Allan Bloom, Jean Wahl, Alfred Chester, Harriet Sohmers, and María Irene Fornés. She remarked that her time in Paris was perhaps the most important period of her life. It certainly provided the basis of her long intellectual and artistic association with the culture of France. She moved to New York in 1959 to live with Fornés for the next seven years, regaining custody of her son and teaching at several universities, including the City College of New York, while her literary reputation grew.

== Career ==
=== Fiction ===
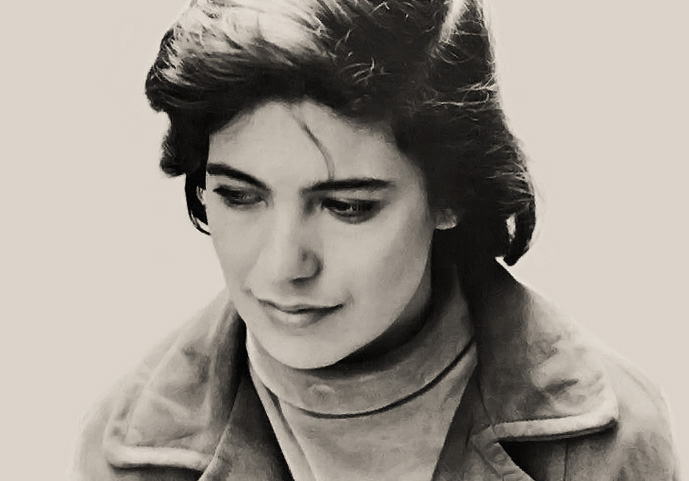
Photo portrait of Sontag, 1966

While working on her stories, Sontag taught philosophy at Sarah Lawrence College and City University of New York and the philosophy of religion with Jacob Taubes, Susan Taubes, Theodor Gaster, and Hans Jonas, in the religion department at Columbia University from 1960 to 1964. She held a writing fellowship at Rutgers University in 1964–65 before ending her relationship with academia in favor of full-time freelance writing.

At age 30, Sontag published an experimental novel called The Benefactor (1963), following it four years later with Death Kit (1967). Despite a relatively small output, Sontag thought of herself principally as a novelist and writer of fiction. Her short story "The Way We Live Now" was published to great acclaim on November 24, 1986, in The New Yorker. Written in an experimental narrative style, it remains a significant text on the AIDS epidemic. She achieved late popular success as a best-selling novelist with The Volcano Lover (1992). At age 67, Sontag published her final novel, In America (2000). The last two novels were set in the past, which Sontag said gave her greater freedom to write in the polyphonic voice:

In a print shop near the British Museum, in London, I discovered the volcano prints from the book that Sir William Hamilton did. My very first thought—I don't think I have ever said this publicly—was that I would propose to FMR (a wonderful art magazine published in Italy which has beautiful art reproductions) that they reproduce the volcano prints and I write some text to accompany them. But then I started to adhere to the real story of Lord Hamilton and his wife, and I realized that if I would locate stories in the past, all sorts of inhibitions would drop away, and I could do epic, polyphonic things. I wouldn't just be inside somebody's head. So there was that novel, The Volcano Lover.

— Sontag, writing in The Atlantic (April 13, 2000)

She wrote and directed four films and also wrote several plays, the most successful of which were Alice in Bed and Lady from the Sea.

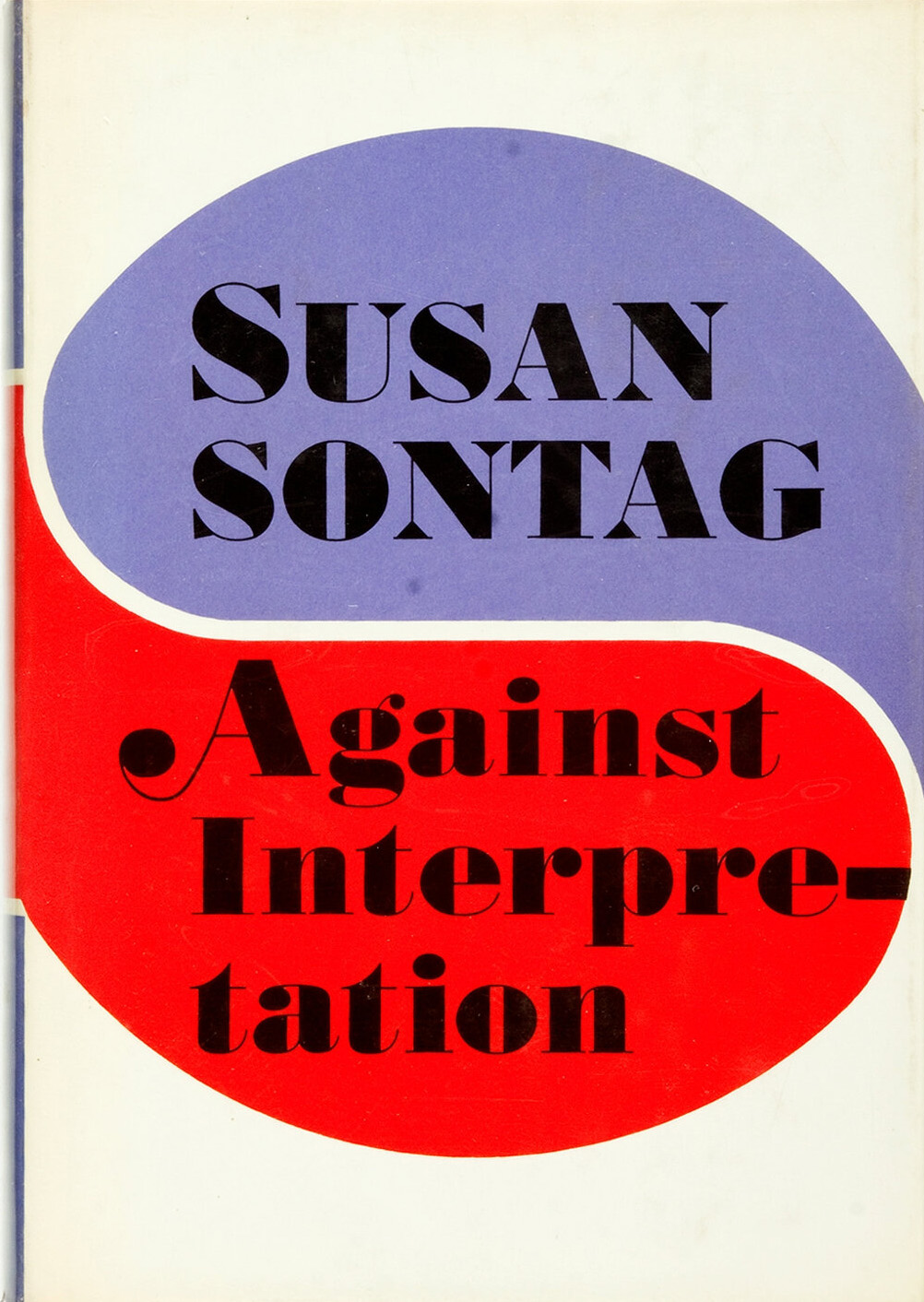
The cover of Against Interpretation (1966), which contains some of Sontag's best-known essays

=== Nonfiction ===
==== High and low in mass culture ====
It was through her essays that Sontag gained early fame and notoriety. She frequently wrote about the intersection of high and low art and expanded the dichotomy concept of form and art in every medium. She elevated camp to the status of recognition with her widely read 1964 essay "Notes on 'Camp' ", which accepted art as including common, absurd, and burlesque themes.

==== The concept of photography image ====
In 1977, Sontag published the series of essays On Photography. These essays are an exploration of photographs as a collection of the world, mainly by travelers or tourists, and the way we experience it. In the essays, she outlined her theory of taking pictures as you travel:

The method especially appeals to people handicapped by a ruthless work ethic—Germans, Japanese and Americans. Using a camera appeases the anxiety which the work driven feel about not working when they are on vacation and supposed to be having fun. They have something to do that is like a friendly imitation of work: they can take pictures. (p. 10)

Sontag writes that the convenience of modern photography has created an overabundance of visual material, and "just about everything has been photographed". This has altered our expectations of what we have the right to view, want to view, or should view.

==== Ethic and the problem of norms ====
Ethical intentions are key points for Sontag. In her book On Photography she writes of the connection of the photography with the idea of norm. Discussing photographs of Diane Arbus, Sontag writes on borders and landmarks of the photo program of beauty. Beauty is the ground of the photography program and at the same time one of the biggest conceptual questions of photography. The problem of identification of beauty and ugliness forms one more question—the idea of norm.

"In teaching us a new visual code, photographs alter and enlarge our notion of what is worth looking at and what we have the right to observe" and has changed our "viewing ethics".

==== Photography: reality and truth ====
According to Sontag, photographs have increased our access to knowledge and experiences of history and faraway places, but the images may replace direct experience and limit reality; photography desensitizes its audience to horrific human experiences, and children are exposed to experiences before they are ready for them.

Sontag continued to theorize about the role of photography in life in her essay "Looking at War: Photography's View of Devastation and Death", which appeared in the December 9, 2002, issue of The New Yorker. There she concludes that the problem of our reliance on images and especially photographic images is not that "people remember through photographs but that they remember only the photographs ... that the photographic image eclipses other forms of understanding—and remembering. ... To remember is, more and more, not to recall a story but to be able to call up a picture" (p. 94).

She became a role model for many feminists and aspiring female writers during the 1960s and 1970s.

== Criticism ==
=== White civilization as a cancer ===
Sontag drew acclaim and criticism for writing in 1967 in Partisan Review:

If America is the culmination of Western white civilization, as everyone from the Left to the Right declares, then there must be something terribly wrong with Western white civilization. This is a painful truth; few of us want to go that far.... The truth is that Mozart, Pascal, Boolean algebra, Shakespeare, parliamentary government, Baroque churches, Newton, the emancipation of women, Kant, Marx, Balanchine ballets, et al, don't redeem what this particular civilization has wrought upon the world. The white race is the cancer of human history; it is the white race and it alone—its ideologies and inventions—which eradicates autonomous civilizations wherever it spreads, which has upset the ecological balance of the planet, which now threatens the very existence of life itself.

According to journalist Mark M. Goldblatt, Sontag later made a "sarcastic retraction, saying the line slanders cancer patients". Patrick J. Buchanan said: "Rewrite that sentence with 'Jewish race' in place of 'white race' and the passage would fit nicely into Mein Kampf". According to Eliot Weinberger, "She came to regret that last phrase, and wrote a whole book against the use of illness as metaphor". But, he wrote, this did not lead to any "public curiosity about those who are not cancerously white", and "She may well have been the last unashamed Eurocentrist".

=== Allegations of plagiarism ===
Ellen Lee accused Sontag of plagiarism after discovering at least 12 passages in In America that were similar to or copied from passages in four other books about Helena Modjeska without attribution. Sontag said of the passages, "All of us who deal with real characters in history transcribe and adopt original sources in the original domain. I've used these sources and I've completely transformed them. There's a larger argument to be made that all of literature is a series of references and allusions."

In a 2007 letter to the editor of the Times Literary Supplement, John Lavagnino identified an unattributed citation from Roland Barthes's 1970 essay "S/Z" in Sontag's 2004 speech "At the Same Time: The Novelist and Moral Reasoning", delivered as the Nadine Gordimer Lecture in March 2004. Further research led Lavagnino to identify several passages that appeared to have been taken without attribution from an essay on hypertext fiction by Laura Miller published in the New York Times Book Review six years earlier. Writing for the Observer, Michael Calderone interviewed Sontag's publisher, who said, "This was a speech, not a formal essay", and that "Susan herself never prepared it for publication".

=== On Communism ===
At a New York pro-Solidarity rally in 1982, Sontag said that "people on the left", like herself, "have willingly or unwillingly told a lot of lies". She added that they:

believed in, or at least applied, a double standard to the angelic language of Communism ... Communism is Fascism—successful Fascism, if you will. What we have called Fascism is, rather, the form of tyranny that can be overthrown—that has, largely, failed. I repeat: not only is Fascism (and overt military rule) the probable destiny of all Communist societies—especially when their populations are moved to revolt—but Communism is in itself a variant, the most successful variant, of Fascism. Fascism with a human face... Imagine, if you will, someone who read only the Reader's Digest between 1950 and 1970, and someone in the same period who read only The Nation or [t]he New Statesman. Which reader would have been better informed about the realities of Communism? The answer, I think, should give us pause. Can it be that our enemies were right?

Sontag's speech reportedly "drew boos and shouts from the audience". The Nation published her speech, excluding the passage contrasting the magazine with Reader's Digest. Responses to her statement were varied. Some said that Sontag's sentiments had been held by many on the left for years, while others accused her of betraying "radical ideas".

=== On the September 11 attacks ===
Sontag was angrily criticized for what she wrote in the September 24, 2001, issue of The New Yorker about the immediate aftermath of 9/11. She called the attacks a "monstrous dose of reality" and criticized U.S. public officials and media commentators for trying to convince the American public that "everything is O.K." Specifically, she opposed the idea that the perpetrators were "cowards", a comment George W. Bush had made. Rather, she argued the country should see the terrorists' actions not as "a 'cowardly' attack on 'civilization' or 'liberty' or 'humanity' or 'the free world' but an attack on the world's self-proclaimed superpower, undertaken as a consequence of specific American alliances and actions."

=== Criticism from other writers ===
In a 2000 article for Harper's Magazine's that was later included in his book Hooking Up, Tom Wolfe called Sontag "just another scribbler who spent her life signing up for protest meetings and lumbering to the podium encumbered by her prose style, which had a handicapped parking sticker valid at Partisan Review."

In "Sontag, Bloody Sontag", an essay in her 1994 book Vamps & Tramps, critic Camille Paglia describes her initial admiration of and subsequent disillusionment with Sontag. She makes several criticisms, including Harold Bloom's comment "Mere Sontagisme!" on Paglia's doctoral dissertation, and says that Sontag "had become synonymous with a shallow kind of hip posturing". Paglia also recounts a visit by Sontag to Bennington College, in which she arrived hours late and ignored the agreed-upon topic of the event.

Sontag's cool self-exile was a disaster for the American women's movement. Only a woman of her prestige could have performed the necessary critique and debunking of the first instant-canon feminist screeds, such as those by Kate Millett or Sandra Gilbert and Susan Gubar, whose middlebrow mediocrity crippled women's studies from the start ... No patriarchal villains held Sontag back; her failures are her own.

— Camille Paglia

In his book Skin in the Game, Nassim Nicholas Taleb criticizes Sontag and other people with extravagant lifestyles who nevertheless declare themselves "against the market system". Taleb assesses Sontag's shared New York mansion at $28 million, and writes that "it is immoral to be in opposition to the market system and not live (somewhere in Vermont or Northwestern Afghanistan) in a hut or cave isolated from it" and that it is even worse to "claim virtue without fully living with its direct consequences".

== Activism ==
Sontag became politically active in the 1960s, opposing the Vietnam War. In January 1968, she signed the "Writers and Editors War Tax Protest" pledge, vowing to refuse to pay a proposed 10% Vietnam War surtax. In May 1968, she visited Hanoi; afterward, she wrote favorably about North Vietnamese society in her essay Trip to Hanoi.

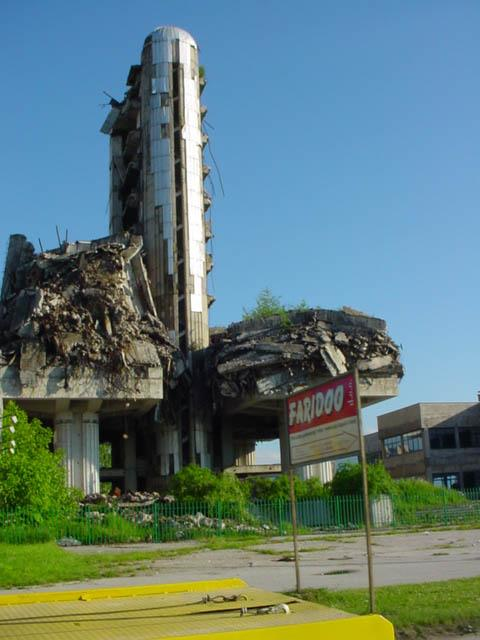
The former Sarajevo newspaper building during the Siege of Sarajevo, when Sontag lived in the city

During 1989 Sontag was the President of PEN American Center, the main U.S. branch of the International PEN writers' organization. After Iranian leader Ayatollah Khomeini issued a fatwa death sentence against writer Salman Rushdie for blasphemy after the publication of his novel The Satanic Verses that year, Sontag's uncompromising support of Rushdie was crucial in rallying American writers to his cause.

A few years later, during the Siege of Sarajevo, Sontag gained attention for directing a production of Samuel Beckett's Waiting for Godot in a candlelit theater in the Bosnian capital, cut off from its electricity supply for three and a half years. The reaction of Sarajevo's besieged residents was noted:

To the people of Sarajevo, Ms. Sontag has become a symbol, interviewed frequently by the local newspapers and television, invited to speak at gatherings everywhere, asked for autographs on the street. After the opening performance of the play, the city's Mayor, Muhamed Kreševljaković, came onstage to declare her an honorary citizen, the only foreigner other than the recently departed United Nations commander, Lieut. Gen. Phillippe Morillon, to be so named. "It is for your bravery, in coming here, living here, and working with us," he said.

== Personal life ==
Sontag's mother died of lung cancer in Hawaii in 1986.

Sontag died in New York City on December 28, 2004, aged 71, from complications of myelodysplastic syndrome which had evolved into acute myelogenous leukemia. She is buried in Paris at Cimetière du Montparnasse. Her final illness has been chronicled by her son, David Rieff.

=== Sexuality and relationships ===
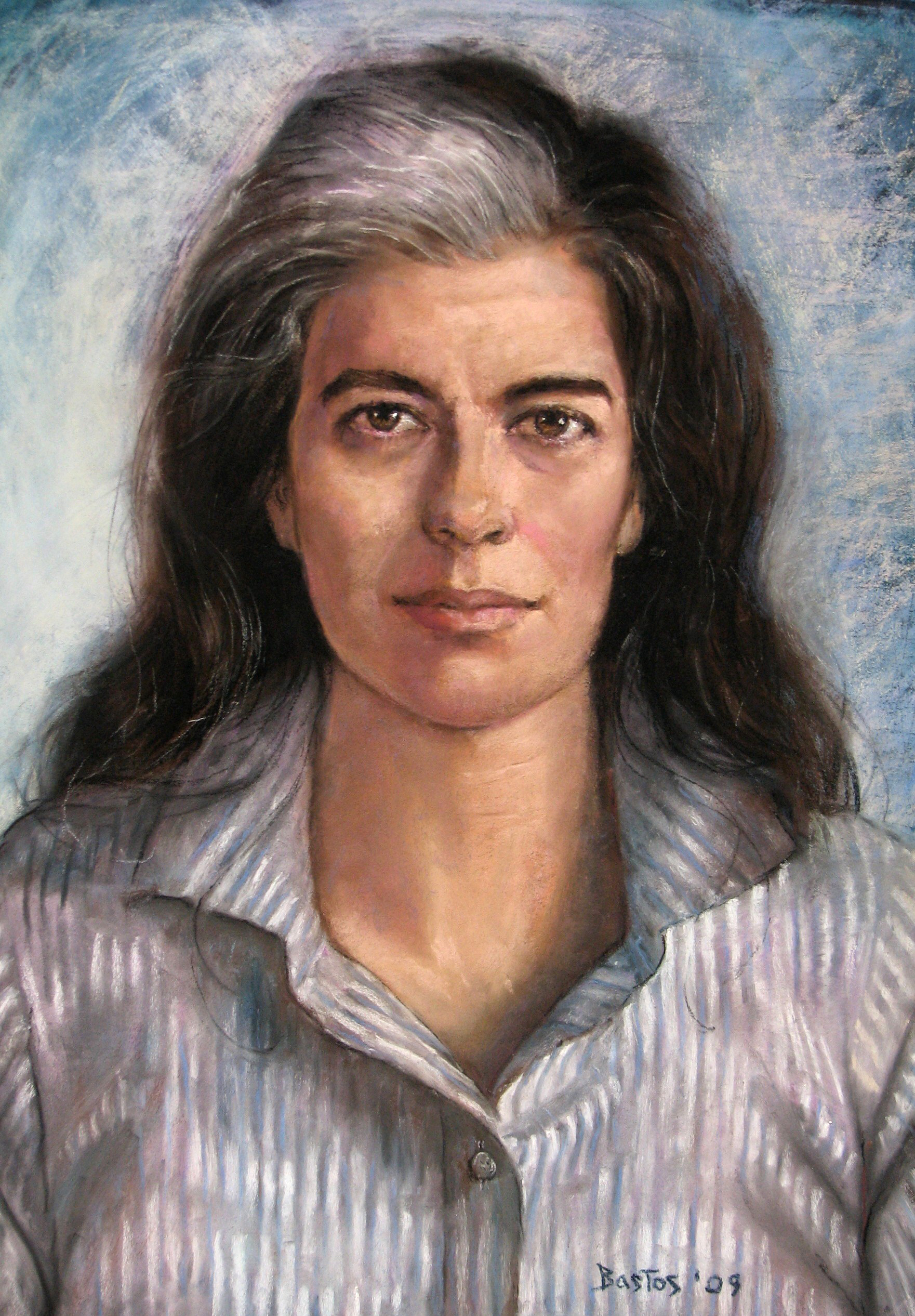
Susan Sontag in 1994, painted by Bolivian artist Juan Fernando Bastos

Sontag became aware of her bisexuality during her early teens. At 15, she wrote in her diary, "I feel I have lesbian tendencies (how reluctantly I write this)." At 16, she had a sexual encounter with a woman: "Perhaps I was drunk, after all, because it was so beautiful when H began making love to me... It had been 4:00 before we had gotten to bed... I became fully conscious that I desired her, she knew it, too."

Sontag lived with 'H', the writer and model Harriet Sohmers Zwerling, whom she first met at U. C. Berkeley from 1958 to 1959. Later, Sontag was the partner of María Irene Fornés, a Cuban-American avant garde playwright and director. Upon splitting with Fornés, she was involved with an Italian aristocrat, Carlotta Del Pezzo, and the German academic Eva Kollisch. Sontag was romantically involved with the American artists Jasper Johns and Paul Thek. During the early 1970s, she lived with Nicole Stéphane, a Rothschild banking heiress turned movie actress, and, later, the choreographer Lucinda Childs. Sontag also had a relationship with the writer Joseph Brodsky, who deepened her appreciation of the anti-communism of the writers persecuted by the Soviet regime, whom she had read and in some cases even known, without really understanding them.

With photographer Annie Leibovitz, Sontag maintained a close romantic relationship stretching from the later 1980s until her final years. Sontag and Leibovitz met in 1989, when both had already established notability in their careers. Leibovitz has suggested that Sontag mentored her and constructively criticized her work. During Sontag's lifetime, neither woman publicly disclosed whether the relationship was a friendship or romantic. Newsweek in 2006 made reference to Leibovitz's decade-plus relationship with Sontag: "The two first met in the late '80s, when Leibovitz photographed her for a book jacket. They never lived together, though they each had an apartment within view of the other's."

When interviewed for her 2006 book A Photographer's Life: 1990–2005, Leibovitz said the book told a number of stories, and that "with Susan, it was a love story." While The New York Times in 2009 referred to Sontag as Leibovitz's "companion", Leibovitz wrote in A Photographer's Life, "Words like 'companion' and 'partner' were not in our vocabulary. We were two people who helped each other through our lives. The closest word is still 'friend.'" The same year, Leibovitz said the descriptor "lover" was accurate. She later reiterated, "Call us 'lovers.' I like 'lovers.' You know, 'lovers' sounds romantic. I mean, I want to be perfectly clear. I love Susan."

In an interview in The Guardian in 2000, Sontag was open about bisexuality:

'Shall I tell you about getting older?', she says, and she is laughing. 'When you get older, 45 plus, men stop fancying you. Or put it another way, the men I fancy don't fancy me. I want a young man. I love beauty. So what's new?' She says she has been in love seven times in her life. 'No, hang on,' she says. 'Actually, it's nine. Five women, four men.'

Many of Sontag's obituaries failed to mention her significant same-sex relationships, most notably that with Leibovitz. Daniel Okrent, public editor of The New York Times, defended the newspaper's obituary, saying that at the time of Sontag's death, a reporter could make no independent verification of her romantic relationship with Leibovitz (despite attempts to do so). After Sontag's death, Newsweek published an article about Leibovitz that made clear references to her relationship with Sontag.

Sontag was quoted by editor-in-chief Brendan Lemon of Out magazine as saying "I grew up in a time when the modus operandi was the 'open secret.' I'm used to that, and quite OK with it. Intellectually, I know why I haven't spoken more about my sexuality, but I do wonder if I haven't repressed something there to my detriment. Maybe I could have given comfort to some people if I had dealt with the subject of my private sexuality more, but it's never been my prime mission to give comfort, unless somebody's in drastic need. I'd rather give pleasure, or shake things up."

== Legacy ==
Following Sontag's death, Steve Wasserman of the Los Angeles Times called her "one of America's most influential intellectuals, internationally renowned for the passionate engagement and breadth of her critical intelligence and her ardent activism in the cause of human rights." Eric Homberger of The Guardian called Sontag "the 'Dark Lady' of American cultural life for over four decades." He observed that "despite a brimming and tartly phrased political sensibility, she was fundamentally an aesthete [who] offered a reorientation of American cultural horizons."

Of Against Interpretation, Brandon Robshaw of The Independent later wrote that "Sontag was remarkably prescient; her project of analysing popular culture as well as high culture, the Doors as well as Dostoevsky, is now common practice throughout the educated world." In Critique and Postcritique (2017), Rita Felski and Elizabeth S. Anker argue that the title essay from the aforementioned collection played an important role in the field of postcritique, a movement within literary criticism and cultural studies that attempts to find new forms of reading and interpretation that go beyond the methods of critique, critical theory, and ideological criticism.

Reviewing Sontag's On Photography in 1998, Michael Starenko wrote that it "has become so deeply absorbed into this discourse that Sontag's claims about photography, as well as her mode of argument, have become part of the rhetorical 'tool kit' that photography theorists and critics carry around in their heads."

Sontag's introduction to Selected Stories, a collection of works by the Swiss author Robert Walser, who was not widely known in the English-speaking world at the time, was highly influential. Phrases from her foreword are often quoted and it has been acknowledged as partly responsible for a new phase of interest in Walser's work.

== Awards and honors ==
- 1976: Arts and Letters Award in Literature
- 1977: National Book Critics Circle Award for On Photography
- 1979: Became member of the American Arts
- 1990: MacArthur Fellowship
- 1992: Malaparte Prize, Italy
- 1999: Commandeur des Arts et des Lettres, France
- 2000: National Book Award for In America
- 2001: Jerusalem Prize, awarded every two years to a writer whose work explores the freedom of the individual in society.
- 2002: George Polk Award for Cultural Criticism for "Looking at War", in The New Yorker
- 2003: Honorary Doctorate of Tübingen University
- 2003: Friedenspreis des Deutschen Buchhandels during the Frankfurt Book Fair
- 2003: Prince of Asturias Award on Literature.
- 2004: Two days after her death, Muhidin Hamamdzic, the mayor of Sarajevo announced the city would name a street after her, calling her an "author and a humanist who actively participated in the creation of the history of Sarajevo and Bosnia." Theatre Square outside the National Theatre was promptly proposed to be renamed Susan Sontag Theatre Square. It took five years, however, for that tribute to become official. On January 13, 2010, the city of Sarajevo posted a plate with a new street name for Theater Square: Theater Square of Susan Sontag.
- 2024: A crater on Mercury was named in her honor in November 2024.

== Works ==
=== Fiction ===
- The Benefactor (1963)
- —— (1967). Death Kit. Farrar, Straus and Giroux. ISBN 9780312420116.
- —— (1977). I, etcetera. Collection of short stories. Farrar, Straus and Giroux. ISBN 9780374174026.
- —— (1991). The Way We Live Now. Noonday Press. ISBN 9780374523053.
- —— (1992). The Volcano Lover. Penguin Books. ISBN 9781558008182.
- —— (1999). In America. Random House Trade Paperbacks. ISBN 9781568958989.

=== Plays ===
- —— (1991). A Parsifal. A deconstruction inspired by Robert Wilson's 1991 staging of the Wagner opera.
- —— (1993). Alice in Bed. About 19th-century intellectual Alice James, who was confined to bed by illness. New York: Farrar, Straus and Giroux. ISBN 9780374102739.
- —— (1998). Lady from the Sea. Adaptation of the 1888 play of the same name by Henrik Ibsen; premiered in Italy.

=== Nonfiction ===
==== Collections of essays ====
Sontag published numerous essays and reviews in The New York Review of Books, Partisan Review, The New Yorker, Vanity Fair, Vogue, The New York Times, the Los Angeles Times, The Times Literary Supplement, The Nation, The New Republic, Art in America, Granta and the London Review of Books. Many of these were included in her collections.

- —— (1966). Against Interpretation. Includes "Notes on "Camp"". Anchor Books. ISBN 9780385267083.
- —— (1969). Styles of Radical Will. Macmillan. ISBN 9780312420215.
- —— (1977). On Photography. Farrar, Straus and Giroux. ISBN 9780374226268.
- —— (1980). Under the Sign of Saturn. Farrar, Straus & Giroux. ISBN 9780374280765.
- —— (2001). Where the Stress Falls. Macmillan. ISBN 9780374289171.
- —— (2007). At the Same Time: Essays and Speeches. Edited by Paolo Dilonardo and Anne Jump, with a foreword by David Rieff. Macmillan. ISBN 9780374100728.
- —— (2023). On Women. Edited by David Rieff, with an introduction by Merve Emre. Picador. ISBN 9781250876867.

==== Monographs ====
- —— (1959). Freud: The Mind of the Moralist. (Authorship disputed)
- —— (1978). Illness as Metaphor. Farrar, Straus and Giroux. ISBN 9780394728445.
- —— (1988). AIDS and Its Metaphors. A continuation of Illness as Metaphor. Farrar, Straus and Giroux. ISBN 9780374102579.
- —— (2003). Regarding the Pain of Others. Farrar, Straus and Giroux. ISBN 9780374248581.

=== Films ===
- (1969) Duet for Cannibals (Duett för kannibaler)
- (1971) Brother Carl (Bröder Carl)
- (1974) Promised Lands
- (1983) Unguided Tour AKA Letter from Venice

=== Discography ===
- (1979) Debriefing

=== Other works ===
- —— (2002). Land (1975–2002). Liner notes by Susan Sontag. Columbia Records.
- —— (2004). Odyssey. Contribution of phrases by Susan Sontag. EMI.
- —— (2008). Reborn: Journals and Notebooks 1947–1963. Edited by David Rieff. New York: Farrar, Straus and Giroux. ISBN 9780312428501.
- —— (2012). As Consciousness Is Harnessed to Flesh: Journals and Notebooks, 1964–1980. Edited by David Rieff. New York: Farrar, Straus and Giroux. ISBN 9780374100766.

== Digital archive ==
A digital archive of 17,198 of Sontag's emails is kept by the UCLA Department of Special Collections at the Charles E. Young Research Library. Her archive—and the efforts to make it publicly available while protecting it from bit rot—are the subject of the article On Excess: Susan Sontag's Born-Digital Archive, by Jeremy Schmidt and Jacquelyn Ardam.

== Biographical play, documentary, and biopic film ==
Sontag: Reborn is a play dramatizing Sontag's life as recorded in her early journals (which were later edited and published as the book Reborn). Described as "a spellbinding X-ray of a writer’s psyche", Sontag: Reborn traces Sontag's private life from age 14 to her emergence as a renowned author and activist. The young Sontag wrestles with her emerging sexuality and precocious intelligence. The refuge of her diary became integral to her development as a writer. The play was adapted from Sontag's journals by theatre artist Moe Angelos, who also plays Sontag in the production, directed by Marianne Weems, and produced by The Builders Association. Sontag: Reborn was first staged at the Under the Radar Festival in 2012, moved to off-Broadway at New York Theatre Workshop in 2013, and was staged into 2014.

A documentary about Sontag directed by Nancy Kates, Regarding Susan Sontag, was released in 2014. It received the Special Jury Mention for Best Documentary Feature at the 2014 Tribeca Festival.

In February 2023, Screen reported that Brouhaha Entertainment was producing a biographical film directed by Kirsten Johnson and featuring Kristen Stewart as Sontag. It is based on Benjamin Moser's biography Sontag: Her Life and Work.

== See also ==
- LGBTQ culture in New York City
- List of LGBTQ people from New York City
