= Benjamin Franklin High School (New Orleans) =

High school in New Orleans, Louisiana

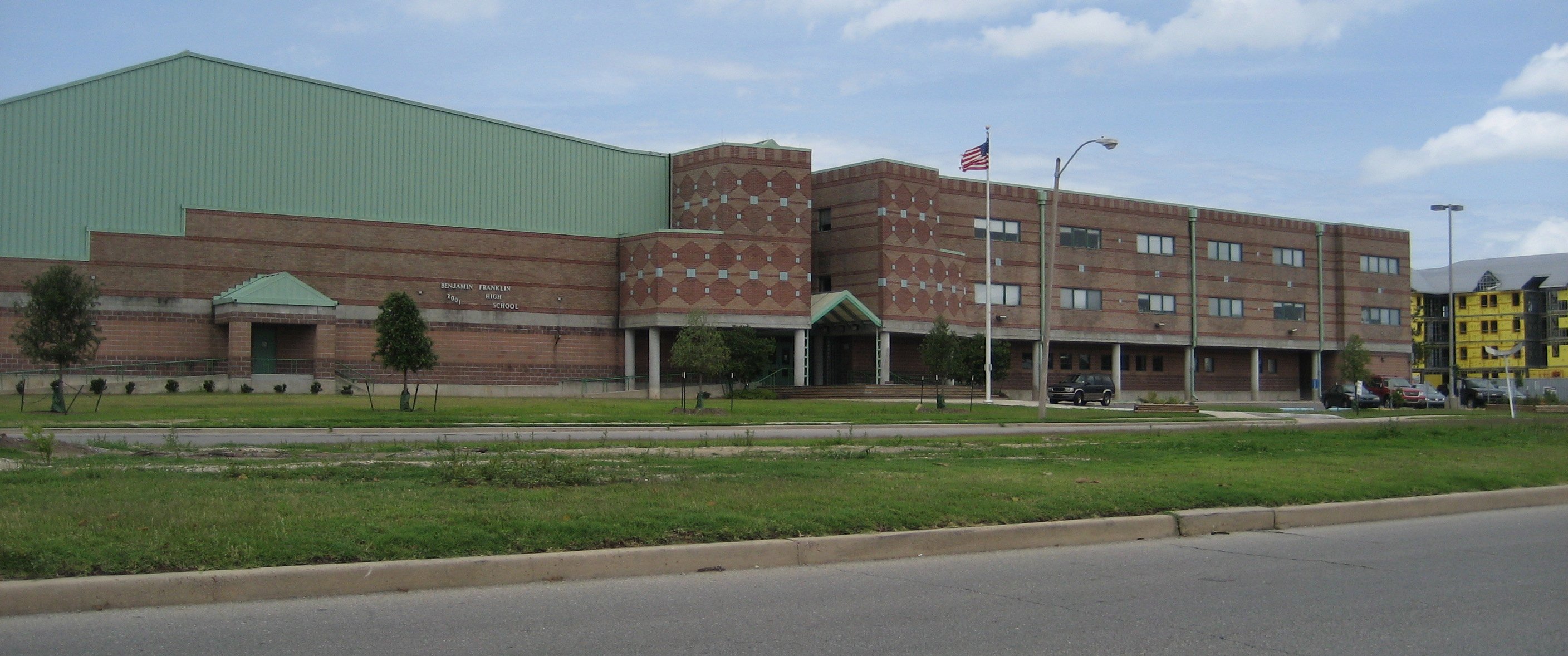

Location
- 2001 Leon C. Simon Drive; New Orleans, Louisiana 70122; United States; 30.0246290°N 90.0650362°W

Information
- School type: Charter high school, magnet high school
- Established: 1957
- School board: Orleans Parish School District (charter school)
- NCES District ID: 2200299
- CEEB code: 192006
- NCES School ID: 220029900888
- Principal: Kendall McManus-Thomas
- Teaching staff: 61.99 (on an FTE basis)
- Grades: 9-12
- Enrollment: 1,056 (2023–2024)
- Student to teacher ratio: 17.04
- Campus size: 6.5 acres (0.0263 km^{2})
- Campus type: Urban
- Colors: Green, white, and orange
- Athletics: LHSAA
- Mascot: Falcon
- Team name: Falcons
- Website: www.bfhsla.org

Benjamin Franklin High School is a charter high school and a magnet high school in New Orleans, Louisiana, United States. Commonly nicknamed "Franklin" or "Ben Franklin", the school was founded in 1957 as a school for gifted children. Ben Franklin is consistently named the No. 1 school in the state of Louisiana and has been ranked by U.S. News & World Report as the No. 15 charter school in the nation. In 1990, it moved to its current location on the campus of the University of New Orleans (UNO) in the Lake Terrace/Lake Oaks neighborhood of Orleans Parish, near Lake Pontchartrain. The school was damaged by several feet of flood water due to Hurricane Katrina in the fall of 2005, and efforts to reopen the school were covered by nationwide news agencies. The school is part of the Orleans Parish School Board (OPSB), yet it operates as a charter school and is not administered directly by the agency.

Ben Franklin has a selective admissions process, and according to CBS News is a "magnet for the city's smart and motivated students." Andrew Vanacore of The Times Picayune wrote in 2013 that Franklin was "top-notch". It has been named a Blue Ribbon School five times by the U.S. Department of Education, and was ranked 16 on the 2009 "America's Best High Schools" list by U.S. News & World Report. The class of 2008 produced 17 National Achievement Semifinalists, the most of any school in the United States. In 2021, U.S. News & World Report ranked the school as the best public high school in Louisiana and the 64th best in the United States.

Ben Franklin is a member of the Louisiana High School Athletic Association and offers a variety of sports programs. Extracurricular activities are also offered in the form of performing arts, school publications, and clubs. Notable alumni of the school include Wynton Marsalis, a Pulitzer Prize winning trumpeter, actor Wendell Pierce, and Cedric Richmond, former congressman and Senior Advisor to U.S. President Joe Biden.

== History ==
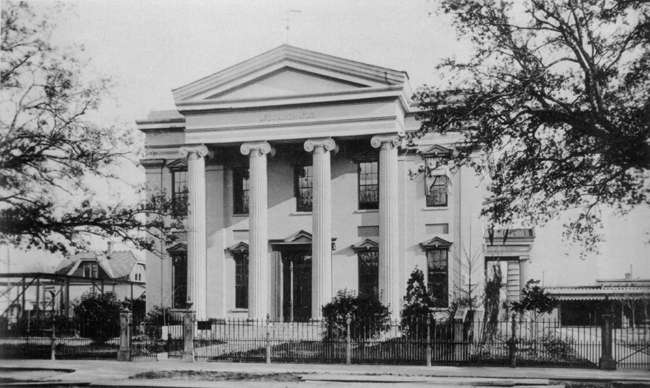
The former Carrollton Courthouse on 719 South Carrollton Avenue housed the original campus of Benjamin Franklin High School from 1957 to 1990. The building became vacant in 2013 and has since re-opened as an assisted living facility.

Benjamin Franklin High School opened as a school for gifted children in 1957 under the direction of School Superintendent James F. Redmond and Principal Naomi Gardberg. At the time, schools under the Orleans Parish School Board were segregated. In 1960, Judge J. Skelly Wright of the U.S. District Court for the Eastern District of Louisiana ordered the desegregation of New Orleans schools in Bush v. Orleans Parish School Board. In response to the order, 2,000 youths surged through New Orleans streets in demonstrations against school integration on November 16, 1960. Only eight Franklin students were absent from class. A Time magazine article later stated that Redmond's "proudest memory of the first day of integration three weeks ago, when truancy was rife, is that 'my Franklin kids stuck with it.'"

From its inception, Franklin was designed to be a public school for gifted students, and admissions requirements included having a 120 IQ. Following an appeal of Bush v. Orleans Parish School Board, the U.S. Court of Appeals for the Fifth Circuit stated in 1962 that Franklin was "one of the finest schools in the country for superior students" and suggested that African American students who met the school's exacting admissions requirements be admitted. Under pressure from federal courts, Franklin became the first public high school in New Orleans to desegregate in 1963.

For over 30 years the school was housed in the historic Carrollton Courthouse on Carrollton Avenue in Uptown New Orleans. Built in 1855, the building had served as the Jefferson Parish Courthouse until the City of Carrollton was incorporated into New Orleans. By 1987, the building had fallen into disrepair and lacked basic air conditioning. Despite these conditions, Franklin maintained a reputation as a place of academic excellence.

In the late 1980s, the Orleans Parish School Board leased land from the University of New Orleans (UNO) and built a larger and more modern campus for Ben Franklin. Ben Franklin moved to this current Lake Terrace/Lake Oaks campus during the 1989–1990 school year. The building was designed by the team of E. Eean McNaughton Architects, Billes Manning Architects, and Perez Architects and received an honor award from the American Institute of Architects Gulf States Region in 1994. Visitors to the school included President Bill Clinton, who spoke with Franklin students on April 30, 1993 about his plans to create a National Service Initiative.

Ben Franklin is located near the London Avenue Canal. Like most other UNO buildings and New Orleans public schools, Ben Franklin was damaged by several feet of flood water due to Hurricane Katrina. The school was closed before the storm hit on August 29, 2005, and remained closed for several months. Over US $3 million in damage was caused by the storm. School administration, faculty, parents, students, alumni, and volunteers participated in a massive cleanup effort, without funding from and independent of the Orleans Parish School Board. The effort was chronicled by several nationwide news agencies.

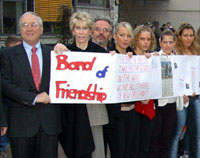
Ambassador William R. Timken, Jr. accepts a "Band of Friendship" from the students of Clay Oberschule on behalf of Ben Franklin.

After Katrina, Ben Franklin received support from across the nation and around the world. On December 8, 2005, the United States Ambassador to Germany, William R. Timken, Jr., accepted a "Band of Friendship" from the students of Clay Oberschule, Ben Franklin's official GAPP partner school in Berlin, Germany. Monetary contributions included $10,000 from the government of France and a $70,000 grant from the Laura Bush Foundation for America's Libraries. The school re-opened as a charter school on January 17, 2006, the 300th birthday of its namesake Benjamin Franklin. The re-opening ceremony was held in the previously flooded-out gym. The gym had been the most severely damaged structure on campus; all of the floor tiles had to be removed and replaced, and the wind-damaged ceiling had to be repaired. In 2007, the school celebrated its 50th anniversary with a free reception.

== Enrollment ==
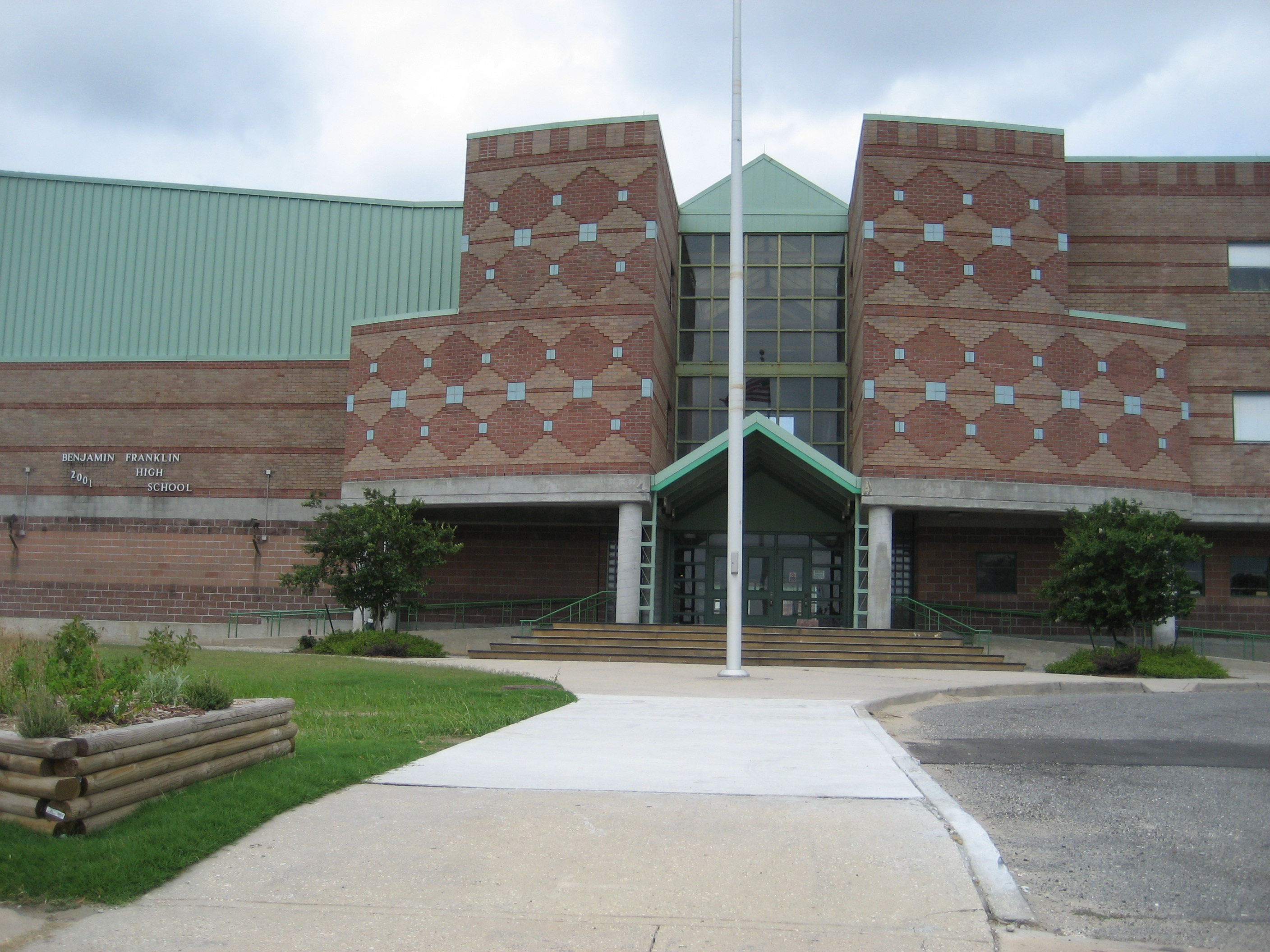
Ben Franklin High School main entrance on Leon C. Simon Drive

An admissions test is required to apply to Ben Franklin. Enrollment is open to residents of Orleans Parish entering ninth, tenth, or eleventh grade. Students applying for tenth grade must have one credit in English, math, science, social studies, and foreign language. Students applying for 11th grade must have two credits in each of the listed courses. Admission is based on an applicant's GPA and performance on the Iowa Test of Basic Skills or the Iowa Tests of Educational Development for reading, language, and mathematics. The Iowa Tests are administered at Ben Franklin. All students meeting the criteria for entrance into 9th grade are also required to pass the LEAP 21 exam (Louisiana Educational Assessment Program for the 21st Century Exam taken in 8th grade). Ben Franklin had 995 students during the 2018–2019 school year. The demographics were 371 (37.3%) Caucasian, 296 (29.8%) African American, 190 (19.1%) Asian, 55 (5,5%) Hispanic, 8 (0.8%) American Indian/Alaskan Native. and 74 (7.4%) multiracial.

== Academics ==
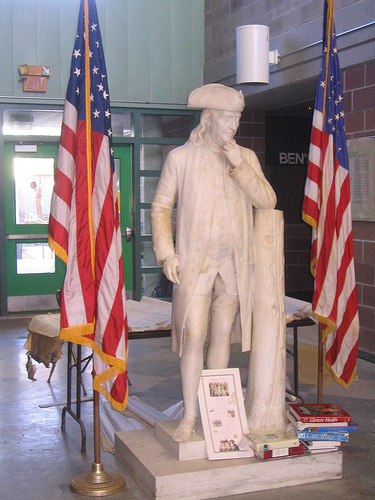
A marble statue of Benjamin Franklin stands in the atrium. The statue was commissioned in 1844 and has been with the school since 1959.

Ben Franklin features a college-preparatory curriculum and an Advanced Placement (AP) Program. Students are required to complete a minimum of 24 academic units that includes 4 in English, 3 in foreign language, 4 in mathematics, 4 in science, 4 in social science, 2 in electives, 1.5 in physical education, .5 in health, and starting with the class of 2012, 1 credit in the arts. As of 2008, the school offers 20 AP courses for students to earn college credit. A selection of elective courses are offered, including studio art, creative writing, music appreciation, and theater. The foreign language offerings are French, German, Spanish, Mandarin, and Latin. Students may also enroll concurrently at local universities and the New Orleans Center for Creative Arts (NOCCA). The school is within walking distance of the UNO library, and students can obtain library cards through a "special borrowers" program.

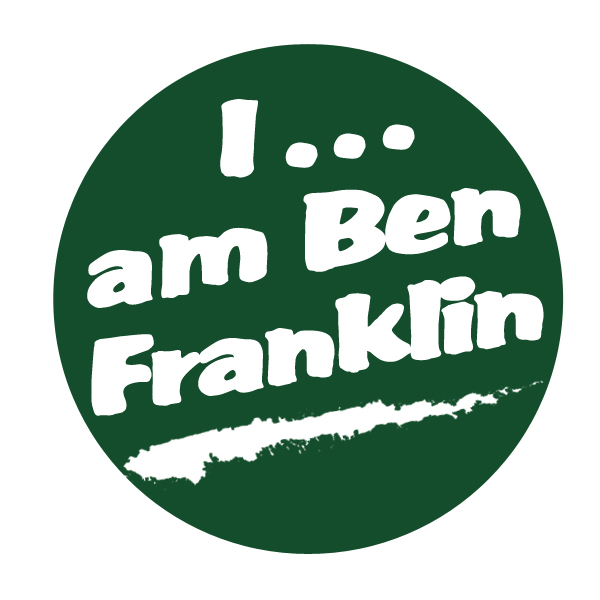
I...am Ben Franklin campaign emblem

According to CBS News, Ben Franklin is "one of the best public high schools in the country — a magnet for the city's smart and motivated students." Approximately 99.5% of each graduating class enters a four-year college. Of the 162 students in the class of 2006, 28 were National Merit Semifinalists, 7 were National Achievement Finalists, and 3 were Hispanic Scholars. The class of 2008 produced 17 National Achievement Semifinalists, the most of any school in the United States. For the class of 2005, the mean SAT Verbal score was 645, and the mean SAT Math score was 636. The mean ACT composite score was 27.2. One hundred percent of Franklin students passed the Louisiana Graduate Exit Examination (GEE) in Spring 2006, with a significant number achieving Advanced and Mastery level. In recent years, Ben Franklin has produced a Morehead-Cain Scholar, a Jefferson Scholar, and many Questbridge Scholars.

In the fall of 2005, Ben Franklin was one of three high schools given a five star rating (the highest possible) by the Louisiana Department of Education, based on its School Performance Score (SPS). The SPS is based on test scores from LEAP/GEE subject area tests in addition to "The Iowa Tests" results and attendance/dropout data. The following table displays the three schools, along with their respective SPS in 2005.

2005 Louisiana School Performance Score (SPS) comparisons
School name	Magnet school status	Performance label (2005)	Baseline SPS (2005)
Benjamin Franklin Senior High School	Yes	Five Stars	200.5
Caddo Parish Magnet High School	Yes	Five Stars	176.6
Baton Rouge Magnet High School	Yes	Five Stars	171.7

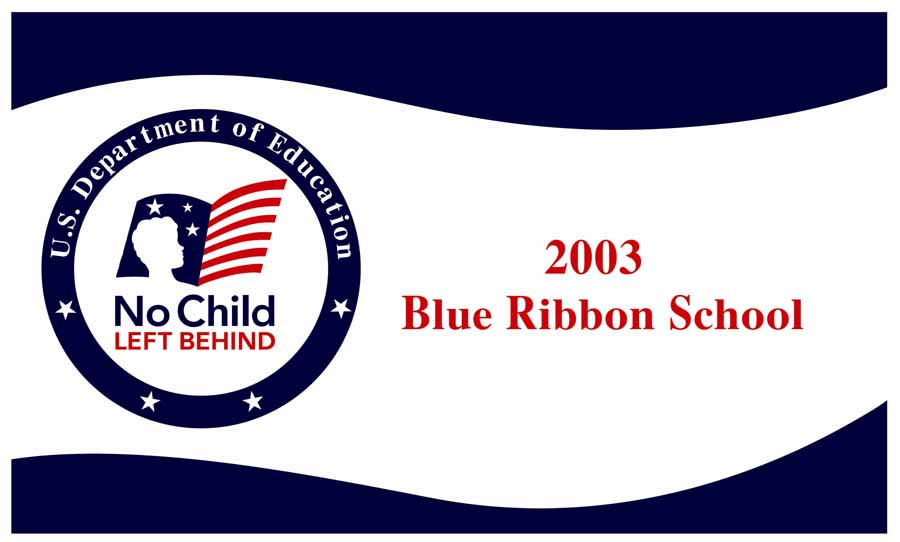
Franklin was named a National Blue Ribbon School in 2003.

In the fall of 2008, the Louisiana Department of Education rated schools in Orleans Parish for the first time since Hurricane Katrina. With an SPS of 165.2, Ben Franklin again had the highest performance score in the state.

Benjamin Franklin High School was named a National Blue Ribbon School by the U.S. Department of Education in 1989, 2003, 2009, 2015, and 2021. It has been ranked by Newsweek and U.S. News & World Report as one of the top 50 public schools in the U.S. with regards to student test scores and advanced placement programs. Ben Franklin was listed as one of the elite public schools in the country by Newsweek in 2006 and 2007. In 2008 and 2009, Franklin was no longer listed as a "public elite" and instead ranked numbers 35 and 52, respectively, on the complete Newsweek lists of "America's Top Public High Schools." Ben Franklin was also ranked 16 in the nation by U.S. News & World Report on its 2009 "America's Best High Schools" list and was one of its featured stories. Additionally, two art and 12 academic Presidential Scholars had been selected from the school as of 2007. The class of 2014 produced 25 National Merit semi-finalists, 15 National Achievement semi-finalists, three National Hispanic Scholars and fifteen National Merit Commended Scholars. 17 Benjamin Franklin seniors were named finalists in the 2014 competition for National Merit Scholarships.

== Extracurricular activities ==
=== Performing arts ===
The music program at Ben Franklin was founded by Peter Dombourian, who served as part-time band director and music teacher from 1974 until 1991. His students included trumpeter Wynton Marsalis, who enrolled concurrently at Ben Franklin and NOCCA. In 2005, the band room and music lockers at Ben Franklin were flooded in the aftermath of Hurricane Katrina, destroying the school's collection of instruments, privately owned instruments left behind by students, and approximately $100,000 of sheet music. The Tipitina's Foundation, New Orleans Music Exchange, Mr. Holland's Opus Foundation, and P.S. 54 Charles W Leng School were among the contributors who helped the music program continue. Student musicians in the concert band and string orchestra participate annually in the Louisiana Music Educator's Association (LMEA) State Festivals, where they often collect "Superior" ratings.

Franklin also has a theater program. In March 2008, Franklin theater students were able to conduct a mixed-media performance of James Still's "And Then They Came for Me: Remembering the World of Anne Frank" with Holocaust survivor/author Eva Schloss in attendance. The play was co-sponsored by the National World War II Museum and coincided with Schloss' lecture at the museum.

Cover of the Spring 2008 volume of The Riverbend Review

=== Publications ===
Franklin also has a TV station for students known as FTV. Ben Franklin publications include The Riverbend Review (literary magazine), and The Franklin Falcon (yearbook). The Riverbend Review, published since 1987, has received numerous awards from the Columbia Scholastic Press Association and the American Scholastic Press Association, winning a Silver Crown and First Place classification in 2008 and a Gold Crown and First Place with Special Merit classification in 2009. The Spring 2008 volume featured student poetry, short stories, original art, and an interview with writer Andrei Codrescu.

== Athletics ==
Ben Franklin teams are known as the "Falcons" with school colors green, white, and orange. The Falcons are in District 11-4A (Div. II) of the Louisiana High School Athletic Association and features the following athletic programs:

- Girls: basketball, cheerleading, cross country, dance team, golf, soccer, softball, swimming, tennis, track, volleyball
- Boys: baseball, basketball, cross country, football, golf, soccer, swimming, tennis, track

=== Championships ===
The Ben Franklin girls' soccer team was the Class 4A State Champion in 1998, 2003, 2004, 2013, 2014, 2015, and 2016. The volleyball team won state titles in 1996, 2002, and 2003. In 16 years as Ben Franklin's head volleyball coach, Jodee Pulizzano led Franklin teams to six Division II state championships and two runner-up trophies.

Accomplishments since 1996 include:

- swimming-girls (AAAA Champion 1997)
- swimming-boys (AAAA Champion 2001)
- volleyball (AAAA Champion 1996, 2002, 2003)
- girls' soccer (AAAA Champion 1998, 2003, 2004, 2013, 2014, 2015, 2016)
- boys' soccer (AAAA Champion 2004; AAAA Runner-up 2005)
- boys' tennis (AAA Champion 2008, 2009)
- Cheerleaders (First place at the Spirit Blast Cheer and Dance Championship 2010 against two other schools)

In 2007, the Ben Franklin football team made the Class 3A playoffs for the first time in school history. However, the team lost in the first round to Amite High School.

== Yearbook 2006 ==
The class of 2006 was the subject of an online documentary called Yearbook 2006, created by bluecadet interactive and produced by Josh Goldblum, Josh Cogan, and David Lee. The non-profit, Web-based project features 140 minutes of raw interviews as well as photographs and other multimedia designed to capture the lives of about 30 Franklin seniors after Katrina. The project, featured in the Substance Abuse and Mental Health Services Administration's Spirit of Recovery conference and USA Today, was designed to "give a cohesive and layered forum to the fractured voices of those seniors who were displaced and those who remained in New Orleans, aiming to, above all, nurture and heal the vibrant social fabric that Katrina threatened to destroy."

== Accusations of bias in admissions ==
The school's selective admissions policies have led to accusations of bias. Before Hurricane Katrina, it was estimated that 450 of 800 applicants on average were not accepted because of insufficient grades and test scores. Compared to the rest of the city, as of 2007, the school has a disproportionately low percentage of African Americans. Carl Galmon, a local activist, claimed in 1996 that Franklin's admissions tests are culturally biased against black students. Following Katrina, the school converted to a charter school and preserved its selective admissions system. The school has received praise for traditionally producing some of the "highest-performing students in the entire state of Louisiana," including an exceptional number of students awarded by the National Achievement Scholarship Program of the National Merit Scholarship Corporation, a program open only to African Americans.

== Notable alumni ==
- Barry Ashe: Judge of the United States District Court for the Eastern District of Louisiana
- Gilda Barabino: president-elect of the American Association for the Advancement of Science
- Hong Chau: actress
- David "Dee-1" Augustine: rapper
- Lolis Eric Elie: former columnist at The Times-Picayune, TV writer for Treme and Hell on Wheels, author, award-winning documentary filmmaker, author of Smokestack Lightning: Adventures in the Heart of Barbecue Country
- Ted Frank: director of the AEI Legal Center for the Public Interest
- Jalila Jefferson-Bullock: Louisiana State Legislature - Representative, District 91: 2003-2007
- Anya Kamenetz: freelance writer and columnist, author of Generation Debt
- David Kinch: chef and owner of Manresa restaurant in Los Gatos, California
- Delfeayo Marsalis: jazz trombonist, attended Ben Franklin/NOCCA
- Wynton Marsalis: Pulitzer Prize-, nine-time Grammy Award-winning musician, attended Ben Franklin/NOCCA
- Jeffery Miller: jazz trombonist, attended Ben Franklin/NOCCA
- James Nolan: poet, fiction writer, essayist, and translator
- Wendell Pierce: actor, star of the HBO dramas The Wire and Treme
- Wade Rathke: co-founder of the Association of Community Organizations for Reform Now (ACORN)
- Cedric Richmond: senior advisor to the president and director of the White House Office of Public Engagement in the Biden administration; former U.S. Representative, Louisiana's 2nd district: 2011-2021
- Clint Smith: author and poet, known for his work in education, incarceration, and inequality
- Chris Smither: folk/blues singer/songwriter
- Richard (Dick) Talens: entrepreneur, celebrity trainer, and co-founder of Fitocracy
- Tania Tetlow: president of Loyola University New Orleans, Fordham University
- Rosie Tran: stand-up comedian, actress, model, and podcast host
- Walter Williams: Saturday Night Live writer, creator of Mr. Bill

== In popular culture ==
Benjamin Franklin High School has appeared in film, books, and other media. In a short play that appears in Louisiana novelist Walker Percy's Lost in the Cosmos, the lead character attends Franklin.

Portions of the school's atrium and front entrance were used in the 2004 Disney Channel movie Stuck in the Suburbs. The school was also used for portions of the 2005 Lifetime Television movie Odd Girl Out.

In Julie Smith's mystery novel Louisiana Hotshot, murder victim Rhonda Bergeron is said to have graduated from Ben Franklin High School in New Orleans. In Ronald Everett Capps' novel Off Magazine Street (loosely adapted into the film A Love Song for Bobby Long), Byron Burns decides to send Hanna to Benjamin Franklin High School, a school "he had heard had a fair reputation".
