= The Boy's King Arthur =

Abridged version of Le Morte d'Arthur

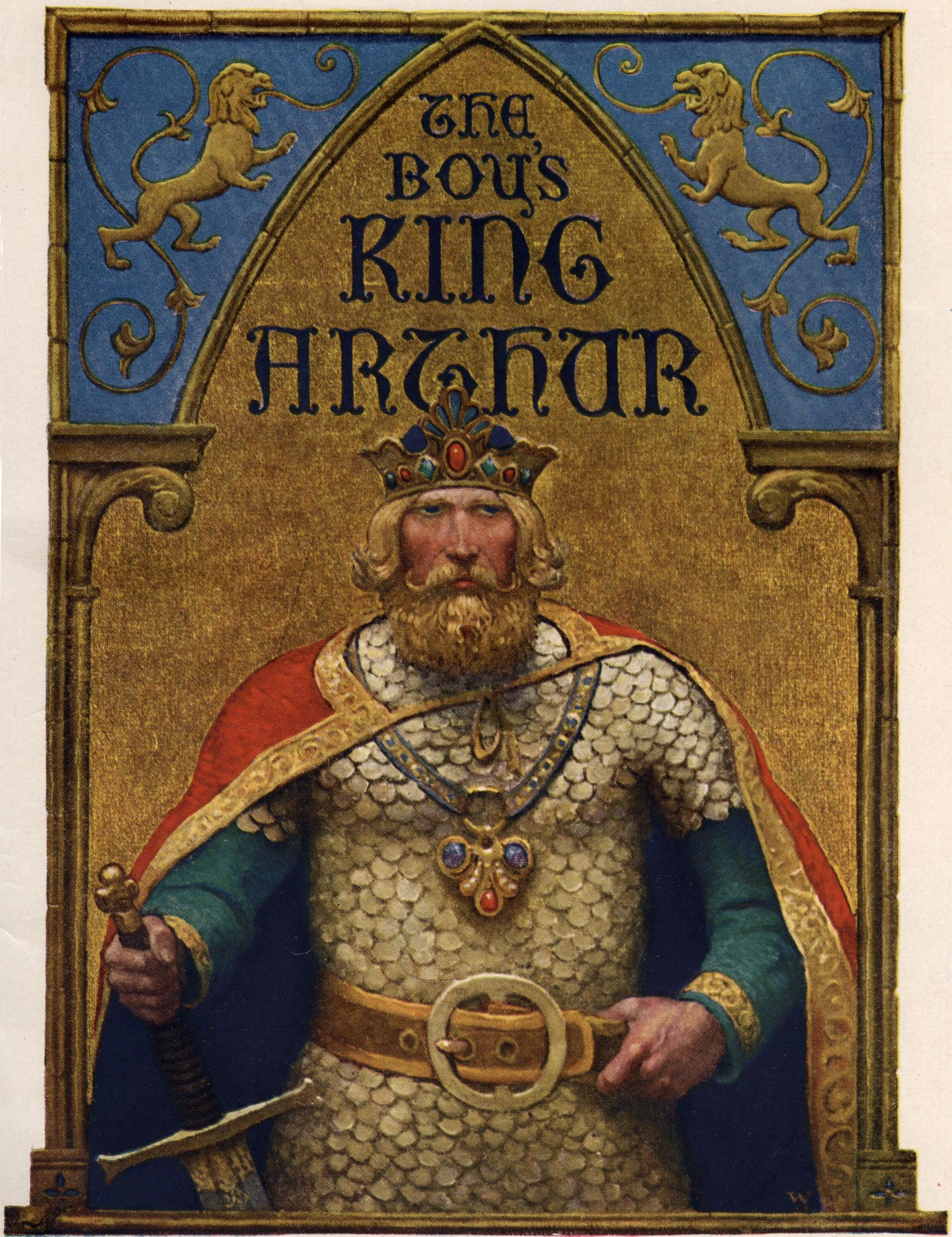
- N. C. Wyeth's stern-looking and bearded King Arthur from the cover of the 1917 edition
- Editor: Sidney Lanier
- Author: Sir Thomas Malory
- Illustrator: Alfred Kappes
- Language: English
- Series: The Boy's Library of Legend and Chivalry
- Genre: Children's literature Chivalric romance
- Set in: Medieval England
- Publisher: Charles Scribner's Sons
- Publication date: 1880
- Publication place: United States
- Pages: 403 (1st edition)
- Preceded by: The Boy's Froissart
- Followed by: The Boy's Mabinogion
- Text: The Boy's King Arthur online

The Boy's King Arthur is an abridged version of Sir Thomas Malory's Le Morte d'Arthur edited by Sidney Lanier and published in 1880. It was intended as a children's edition, alongside Lanier's other "Boy's" works. The original title, including its subtitle, was The Boy's King Arthur being Sir Thomas Malory's History of King Arther and his Knights of the Round Table. It was republished in 1950 under the title King Arthur and his Knights of the Round Table.

== Contents ==
Comparative illustrations

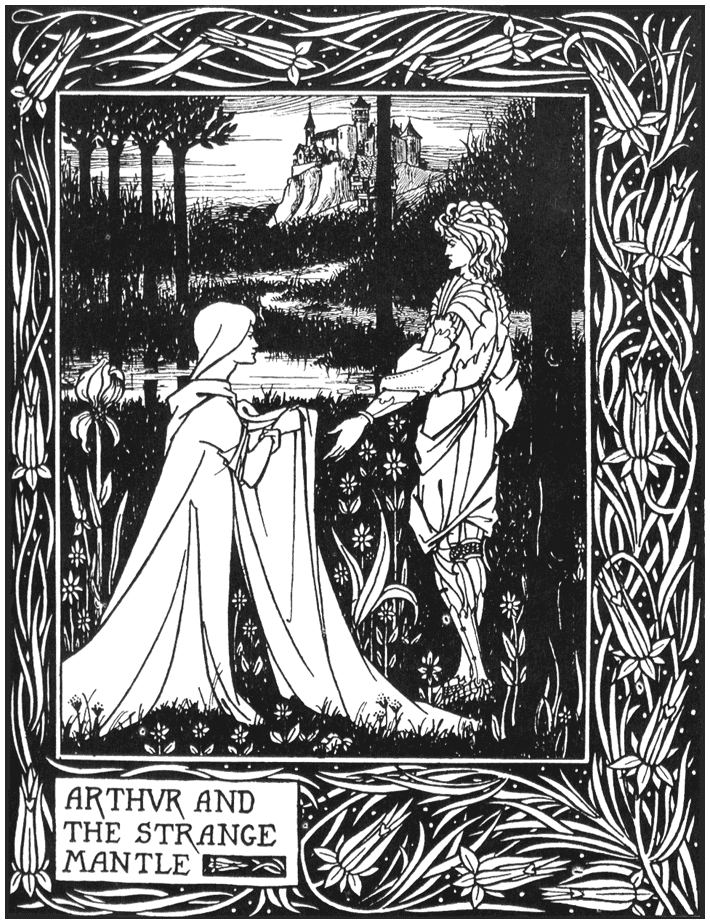
Beardley's "Arthur and the strange mantle" from the Mort by Dent

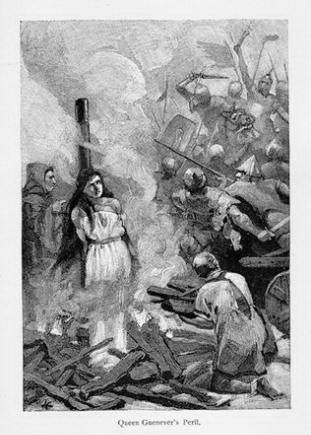
Kappes' "Queen Guenever's Peril" used for the 1880 edition

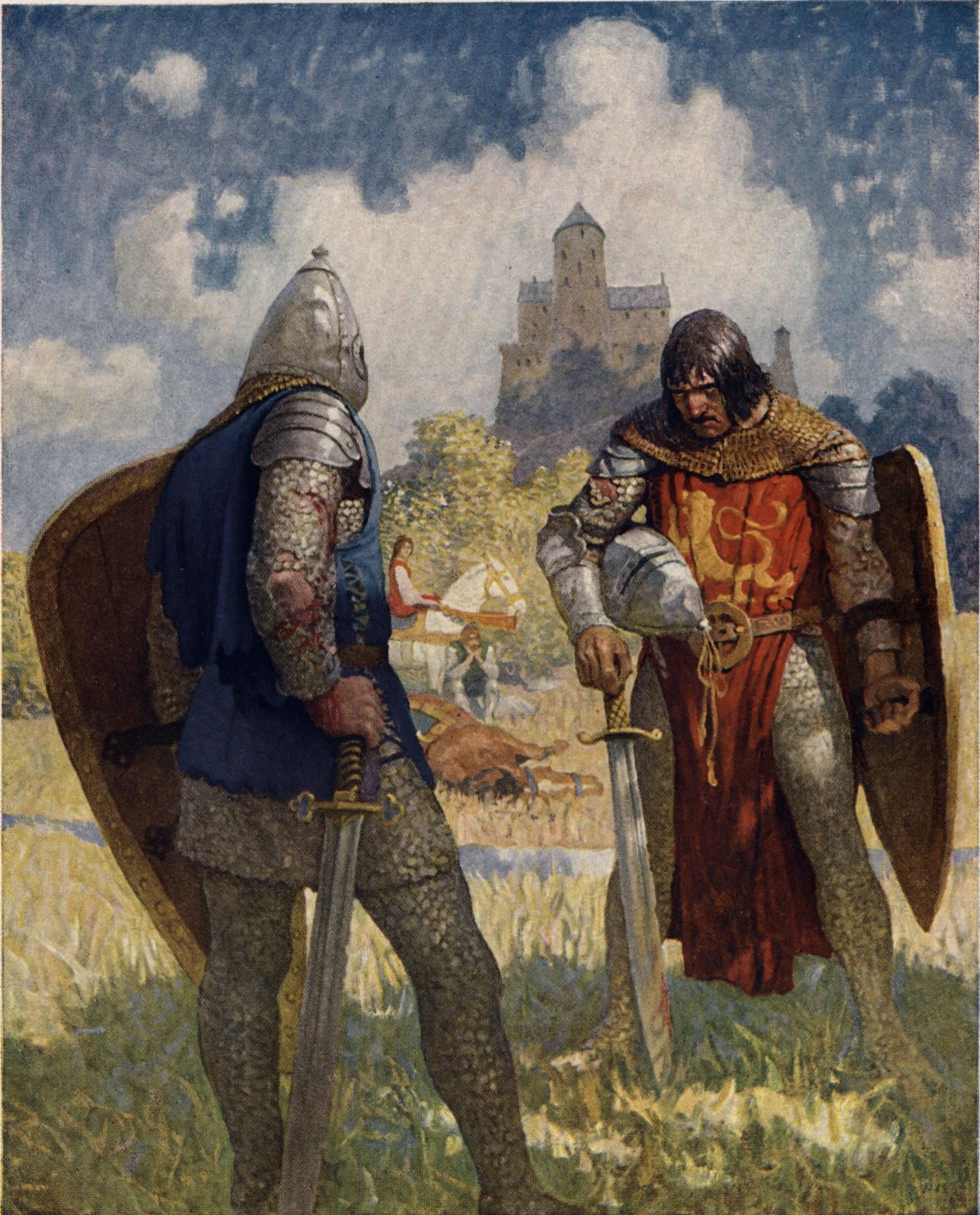
Wyeth's illustration of Lancelot and Sir Turquine

Lanier included his own introduction, an extract (with translation) from Brut by Layamon, and William Caxton's introduction to the Morte. There were 12 illustrations based upon paintings by Alfred Kappes in the original edition, although subsequent editions have been illustrated by many other people.

Professor of English Siân Echard states that the 1917 edition illustrated by N. C. Wyeth is "particularly important" as its colour illustrations of large muscular figures contrast with Aubrey Beardsley's illustrations of the 1893 edition of the Morte for publisher J. M. Dent. The 1917 edition had 14 such illustrations, and was an abridgement of Lanier's own abridgment, omitting things like the tale of Balin. The number of Wyeth's illustrations was reduced to 9 in later printings. Wyeth and Kappes only had two subjects in common, where they both illustrated the Lady of the Lake giving the sword Excalibur to King Arthur and Arthur's final battle with Mordred.

Charles Scribner's Sons kept the 1880 edition with Kappes' illustrations in print until 1937, as part of its "The Boy's Library of Legend and Chivalry" series, in parallel with the 1917 edition that was part of its "Scribner's Illustrated Classics" series. Grosset and Dunlap published a new edition in 1950, re-titled King Arthur and his Knights of the Round Table, from Sir Thomas Malory's le morte d'Arthur and with illustrations by Florian Kraner. There were 10 colour full-page illustrations in this edition, with further black and white illustrations at the head of each chapter.

Lanier indicated his joins, where he had abridged Malory's text with his own words, with brackets. He also modernized the spelling and added notes to several archaisms like "hight" and "mickle".

His abridgements and bowdlerizations included the removal of Uther's rape of Igraine, and other items, sexual and otherwise, that would tarnish the image of the Knights of the Round Table for children, including Malory's account of Sir Lancelot's madness, Sir Gareth's pre-marital sex, and the relationship between Tristram and Isolde. He substitutes an oblique explanation for Guinevere banishing Lancelot that does not involve Elaine, but merely states that Brisen (whom he simply calls "a certain enchantress") had made it seem that Lancelot had "shamed his knighthood", manner unspecified. Similarly, he removed suggestions that Guinevere may be envious of Elaine because of her relationship with Lancelot.

Also watered down are Lancelot's reasons for fighting for Guinevere, reduced to an explanatory footnote, and to a vague accusation of "treason" by Sir Meliagrance, rather than that she had committed adultery with one of the wounded knights. This subtly alters the context of the fight, making it seem that Lancelot is on the side of truth and honour, rather that trying to hide behind the technicality that it had been him that she had slept with, not a wounded knight. Her later being condemned to death makes no mention of this, either; Lanier simply explains that the queen was "again appealed of treason", with no specifics given.

Although Lanier took out the sexual improprieties, he left much of the violence and ignoble behaviour unaltered, including Gareth's killing of six thieves, young men throwing things at Lancelot, the killing of Tristram, and the killing of Sir Lamorak. The latter two are almost without explanation, as the sexual incidents that motivate them are omitted.

== Influences ==
Professor of English Dennis Prindle suggested that The Boy's King Arthur may have been John Steinbeck's first encounter with Arthurian legend. While it is generally acknowledged that Mark Twain's introduction to Malory's Morte came in 1884, as noted in Twain's biography by Albert Bigelow Paine, Alan Gribben notes that the Clemens family had bought two copies of Lanier's book on November 18, 1880 and December 13, 1880, and that Twain may have read those, given his habit of reading his daughter's books aloud to his family, and have first encountered Arthurian characters there. Professor of English Betsy Bowden has taken the argument further, suggesting that in fact the change in tone partway through Twain's A Connecticut Yankee in King Arthur's Court is caused by his switching from The Boy's King Arthur to the Morte proper. However, this hypothesis founders on the fact that Twain is recorded a decade before as already having a jaundiced view of the Middle Ages.

Walker Percy stated in a 1987 letter that Wyeth's "marvellous" illustrations from The Boy's King Arthur had influenced his novel Lancelot, recalling in particular the aforementioned final battle, the gift of Excalibur, and the illustration of Lancelot and Sir Turquine, with Lancelot "bloodied up in his chainmail and leaning on his broadsword".

== See also ==
- King Arthur and His Knights of the Round Table by Roger Lancelyn Green — a different children's edition that was published in 1953
