= Love in the Ruins =

1971 novel by Walker Percy

First edition (publ. Farrar, Straus & Giroux)

Love in the Ruins (subtitle:The Adventures of a Bad Catholic at a Time Near the End of the World) is a novel of speculative or science fiction by author Walker Percy from 1971. It follows its main character, Dr Thomas More, namesake and descendant of Sir Thomas More (author of Utopia), a psychiatrist in a small town in Louisiana called Paradise.

Over time, the U.S. has become progressively more fragmented between left and right, black and white, as social trends of the 1960s run to their logical extremes. Society begins to come apart at the seams, and no one except More seems to notice, and no one, including him, seems particularly to care. More, a lapsed Catholic, alcoholic, and womanizer, invents a device that he names the Ontological Lapsometer, which can diagnose and treat the harmful mental states at the root of society's slow disintegration. However, in the wrong hands, the device can also exacerbate the problems, and a government representative, intent on getting More a Nobel Prize, seeks to put it to his own uses while More attempts to prevent a disaster.

== Themes ==
The novel investigates and satirizes many facets of American society, including religion, sexuality, medical and scientific ethics, and race relations. As in many of Percy's other works, among them The Moviegoer, The Second Coming, and The Last Gentleman, the novel's protagonist suffers from alienation and existential doubt. But the protagonists' detachment from themselves allows for a lighter tone and often a comic distance from the world. Dr More's hyper-fragmented community allows for comic caricatures while still reflecting on the roots of society's problems.
