= The Message in the Bottle =

1975 collection of essays on semiotics by Walker Percy

- First edition
- Author: Walker Percy
- Language: English
- Genre: Non-fiction: essays
- Publisher: Farrar, Straus and Giroux
- Publication date: 1975
- Publication place: United States
- Media type: Print (hardback)
- Pages: 335 pp.
- ISBN: 1-399-23128-6

The Message in the Bottle: How Queer Man Is, How Queer Language Is, and What One Has to Do with the Other is a collection of essays on semiotics written by Walker Percy and first published in 1975. Percy writes at what he sees as the conclusion of the modern age and attempts to create a middle ground between the two dying ideologies of that age: Judeo-Christian ethics, which give the individual freedom and responsibility; and the rationalism of science and behavioralism, which positions man as an organism in an environment and strips him of this freedom.

== "The Delta Factor" ==
"The Delta Factor," first published in January 1975 in the Southern Review, sets out the overall themes of the entire book. Percy begins by asking why modern humans are so sad despite the 20th century's technological innovations and unprecedented levels of comfort. More specifically, he is interested in why humans feel happy in bad situations and sad in good situations (a question also posed in his novel The Last Gentleman). He posits that this overarching sadness is due to contemporary society's position between two ages: the modern age, which is more or less slowly becoming out of date, and a new age, which is dawning but has not yet truly dawned. The anthropological theories of the modern age, according to Percy, "no longer work and the theories of the new age are not yet known" (7). Percy therefore sees his task as coming up with a new theory of humanity, which he chooses to center on language, the human attribute that separates us from the animals; The Message in the Bottle will attempt to explain humans' strange behavior and unexplained sadness by explaining how humans deal with language and symbols.

Percy says that the current theories of humanity make us into a sort of monster, a "centaur organism-plus soul . . . one not different from beasts yet somehow nevertheless possessing 'freedom' and 'dignity' and 'individuality' and 'mind' and such" (9). Modern humanity is, then, the collision of Judeo-Christian ethics and its focus upon individual freedom and scientific behaviorism, which says that humans are no different from the animals—in other words, modern people believe themselves to be no different from animals and yet somehow above them. What's more, no existing research really deals with the question of how language really works, of how human beings use and understand the symbols of linguistics. Percy puts this question into a sort of no-man's land, what he calls a "terra incognita" (17), between linguistics and psychology, the former of which deals with the results of language and the latter of which deals with the way people respond to language.

The Delta Factor, Percy's theory of language, is framed in the context of the story of Helen Keller's learning to say and sign the word water while Annie Sullivan poured water over her hands and repeatedly made the signs for the word into her hand. A behaviorist linguistic reading of this scene might suggest a causal relationship—in other words, Keller felt Sullivan's sign-language stimulus in her hand and in response made a connection in her brain between the signifier and the signified. This is too simplistic a reading, says Percy, because Keller was receiving from both the signifier (the sign for water) and the referent (the water itself). This creates a triangle between water (the word), water (the liquid), and Helen, in which all three corners lead to the other two corners and which Percy says is "absolutely irreducible" (40). This linguistic triangle is thus the building block for all of human intelligence. The moment when this Delta Δ entered the mind of a person—whether this happened via random chance or through the intervention of a deity—that person became human.

Further, in Delta Δ, the corners of the triangle are removed from their behaviorist contexts. Helen Keller, in other words, becomes something other than just an organism in her environment because she is coupling two unrelated things—water the word and water the liquid—together. Likewise, water the liquid is made something more than water the liquid because Keller has coupled it with the arbitrary sound water, and water the word becomes more than just the sound of the word water (and the shape of the sign language for water). In this way, "the Delta phenomenon yielded a new world and maybe a new way of getting at it. It was not the world of organisms and environments but just as real and twice as human" (44)—humans are made whole by the Delta Δ where the popular notions of religion and science had split us in two.

== "The Loss of the Creature" ==
"The Loss of the Creature" is an exploration of the way the more or less objective reality of the individual is obscured in and ultimately lost to systems of education and classification. Percy begins by discussing the Grand Canyon—he says that, whereas García López de Cárdenas, who discovered the canyon, was amazed and awed by it, the modern-day sightseer can see it only through the lens of "the symbolic complex which has already been formed in the sightseer's mind" (47). Because of this, the sightseer does not appreciate the Grand Canyon on its own merits; he appreciates it based on how well or poorly it conforms to his preexisting image of the Grand Canyon, formed by the mythology surrounding it. What is more, instead of approaching the site directly, he approaches it by taking photographs, which, Percy says, is not approaching it at all. By these two processes—judging the site on postcards and taking his own pictures of it instead of confronting it himself—the tourist subjugates the present to the past and to the future, respectively.

Percy suggests several ways of getting around this situation, almost all of them involving bypassing the structure of organized approaches—one could go off the beaten path, for example, or be removed from the presence of other tourists by a natural disaster. This bypassing, however, can lead to other problems: Namely, the methods used are not necessarily authentic; "some stratagems obviously serve other purposes than that of providing access to being" (51). Percy gives the example of a pair of tourists who, disgusted with the proliferation of other tourists in the popular areas of Mexico, stumble into a tiny village where a festival is taking place. The couple enjoys themselves and repeatedly tells themselves, "Now we are really living," but Percy judges their experience inauthentic because they are constantly concerned that things may not go perfectly. When they return home, they tell an ethnologist friend of theirs about the festival and how they wish he could have been there. This, says Percy, is their real problem: "They wanted him, not to share their experience, but to certify their experience as genuine" (53).

The layman in modern society, then, surrenders his ownership to the specialist, whom he believes has authority over him in his field. This creates a caste system of sorts between laymen and experts, but Percy says that the worst thing about this system is that the layman does not even realize what it is he has lost.

This is most evident in education. Percy alludes to a metaphor he had used in "The Delta Factor," that of the literature student who cannot read a Shakespearean sonnet that is easily read by a post apocalyptic survivor in Aldous Huxley's Brave New World. The literature student is blocked from the sonnet by the educational system built around it, what Percy calls its "package." Instead of transmitting the subject of education, education often transmits only itself, and the student does not view the subject as open and delightful, nor does he view himself as sovereign. Percy offers two ways around this, both involving, as did his solution to the problem of the Grand Canyon, an indirect approach. Either the student can suffer some sort of ordeal that opens the text to him in a new way; or else he can be apprenticed to a teacher who takes a very unusual approach to the subject. He suggests that biology students be occasionally taught literature, and vice versa.

The overall effect of this obscuration by structure is one of the basic conditions of modern society: The individual layman is reduced to being a consumer. The individual thing becomes lost to the systems of classification and theory created for the consumer, and the individual man loses all sense of ownership. The solution to this problem, according to Percy, is not to get rid of museums but for "the sightseer to be prepared to enter into a struggle to recover a sight from a museum" (62).

== "Metaphor as Mistake" ==
Percy begins "Metaphor as Mistake" (1958) with five metaphors which were misunderstood; these misunderstood metaphors, he says, have nevertheless "resulted in an authentic poetic experience . . . an experience, moreover, which was notably absent before the mistake was made" (65). Metaphor, in Percy's view, is a way of getting at the real nature of a thing by comparing it to something that it does not resemble on the surface. It becomes a tool for ontological exploration.

Existing inquiries have failed to notice this, however, because they either abstract their viewpoints from both effective and ineffective metaphors (this is the path of philosophy) or focus on the individual effects of the individual poet (this is the path of literary criticism). As he does in "The Delta Factor," Percy wishes to seek a middle ground between these two extremes. He makes it clear, however, that the metaphor has scientific, rather than strictly poetic, value for him; he sees metaphor as a method of getting at the way things actually are.

Two qualifications exist for the metaphor as mistake: It must be given by an authority figure, and it must have a certain aura of mystery around it. In this way, the metaphor becomes both right (given by authority) and wrong (not strictly true as a descriptor).

Percy's example is of a boy on a hunting trip who sees a bird and asks what it is. The African-American accompanying him and his father calls the bird a blue dollar, which excites the boy until his father corrects him and tells him the bird is actually a blue darter. The term blue darter may describe what the bird does and what color it is, says Percy, but blue dollar in some mystical way gets at what the bird actually is. When the boy saw the bird, he formed a subjective impression of it—what Percy calls the bird's "apprehended nature" (72)--and in some sense the mistaken name blue dollar gets right at the heart of that apprehended nature.

In this way, the metaphor becomes both science and poetry; it is a sort of subjective science, the ontology of the world as it appears to the individual. Percy says that we can only understand reality through metaphor. We never perceive the world--"We can only conceive being, sidle up to it by laying something else alongside" (72). All language, then, and perhaps all intelligence, are therefore metaphorical. When one person makes a metaphor, the people who hear it hope that it corresponds to their subjective understanding of reality—an understanding they may or may not even be consciously aware of.

The poet, according to Percy, has a double-edged task: his metaphors must ring true, but they must be flexible enough to reverberate with his audience and for them to gain a new understanding of the things to which they refer. The poet must refer to things we already know, but he must do so in new ways; in this, he gives his audience access to their own private experiences.

This can lead to a sort of blind groping for metaphors, however, a process which Percy sees as effective but harmful. Authority and intention are essential for metaphors to be shared between the Namer and the Hearer.

== "Notes for a Novel About the End of the World" ==
"A Novel About the End of the World" makes a striking counterpart to Percy's novel Love in the Ruins, subtitled "The Adventures of a Bad Catholic at a Time Near the End of the World" and published only four years after the essay. The apocalyptic novel is a form of prophecy, a warning about what will happen if society does not change its ways. This sort of novel is written by a particular type of novelist, one defined not by his quality but by his goals. Percy refers to this novelist as a "religious novelist" but notes that he includes atheists such as Jean-Paul Sartre and Albert Camus in this category because of their "passionate conviction about man's nature, the world, and man's obligation in the world" (103).

The religious novelist, says Percy, has very different concerns than the mainstream of the society in which he lives—so different, in fact, one must decide whether society is blind or whether the novelist is insane or a charlatan. The central difference between the novelist and the rest of society is that the former tends to be pessimistic and the latter tends to be optimistic. The novelist has a "profound disquiet" (106).

The novelist is set off in particular against the scientist and against the "new theologian"—from the former because the novelists insists on the individual while science measures only categories, and from the latter because the novelist still believes in original sin. The Christian novelist in particular recognizes that the problem is not that Christianity is not relevant to modern society but that man's blind acceptance of "the magical aura of science, whose credentials he accepts for all sectors of reality" (113) is changing his consciousness to the point where he can no longer recognize the Gospel.

The novel about the end of the world, then, is an attempt to shock the complacent reader out of his scientism and into the light of the real world.

== "The Message in the Bottle" ==
In The Message in the Bottle, Percy attempts to separate information into two categories: knowledge and news. The essay is built on an extended metaphor of a castaway with amnesia who remembers nothing but the island he washes up on and who creates a new life with the natives of the island. The castaway frequently finds on the beach bottles that have one-sentence messages on the inside, such as "There is fresh water in the next cove," "The British are coming to Concord," or "Lead melts at 330 degrees."

A group of scientists lives on the island, and they separate these messages into two categories: empirical facts and analytic facts. The castaway is disturbed by this classification, however, because it does not take into account the messages' effect on the reader. Thus, he comes up with the categories of knowledge and news. Knowledge belongs to science, to psychology and to the arts; simply put, it is that "which can be arrived at anywhere by anyone and at any time" (125). News, on the other hand, bears directly and immediately on his life. The scientists, because of their commitment to objectivity above all else, cannot recognize the difference between these two categories.

A piece of news is not verified the way a piece of knowledge is—whereas knowledge can be verified empirically, news can be verified empirically only after the hearer has already heeded its call. The castaway must first, however, decide when to heed the call of a piece of news and when to ignore it. Percy sets forth three criteria for the acceptance of a piece of news: (a) its relevance to the hearer's predicament; (b) the trustworthiness of the newsbearer; and (c) its likelihood or possibility. As news depends so heavily on its bearer, the messages in bottles that the castaway finds cannot be sufficient credential in and of themselves. The castaway must know something about the person who wrote them.

The problem with modern society is that too many people attempt to cure their feelings of homelessness by seeking knowledge in the fields of science and art. Their real problem, says Percy, is that their feelings of homelessness come from their being stranded on the island—they should be looking for news from across the seas.

Percy links this distinction between news and knowledge to how the world understands the Christian gospel. He writes that the gospel must be understood as a piece of news and not a piece of knowledge. To Percy, the gospel is news from across the seas.

== "Culture: The Antinomy of the Scientific Method" ==
In this essay, Percy tries to expose the limitation of our present-day science and scientific method when it is applied to human beings, especially to human cultures. Science, for its own completeness, must be able to address humans and our cultures. He attributes the limitation to the fact that science does not take all humans' assertions as valid statements. After proving his point that discarding assertions leads to antinomies, i.e., contradictions between human culture and science, though by themselves each is reasonable, he goes on to propose a radical change to the presumptions of the scientific method. The outline here does not strictly follow the original essay to the letter in the sense that there are references to newer pieces of information, but the essence of the essay is unconditionally maintained. The additional material only bolsters Percy’s point of view.

The culmination of a scientific method is always an assertion. For example, the physical, space-time event of energy exchange happening inside a closed system can be examined carefully, resulting in an assertion that mass cannot be created or destroyed. This can be further asserted concisely with an equation of the form $\Sigma M_i = \Sigma M_f$. Another experiment is, say, we take a mass, $m$, and convert it into equivalent energy. This is also a physical space-time event, happening right in front of us. The event can be asserted by a scientist as $E=mc^2$, and all scientists (and non-scientists too) can interpret and understand the associated meaning.

In both the examples above, there are two different kinds of activities happening.

1. A space-time event in which a state A results in state B. This activity is a physical reality which can be perceived physiologically and psychologically.
2. A judgement which asserts that such is indeed the case. Such assertions are of the form $E=f(C)$ (where we are saying, $E$ is the dependent effect which results as a function of some independent causes, $C$), but can be of other forms such as a scientific law.

There is a definite qualitative difference between (1) and (2). The first one is a palpable physical space-time happening which can be observed by everybody. The second one requires an understanding of the meaning by which an intellect (Percy uses this word in a generic sense as any human being) can grasp the meaning. (2) is not part of (1). There is a difference between reality and humans understanding it via assertory statements. All real events, under the investigation of scientific method (whose main parts are hypothesizing, experimental verification, and conclusion), result in assertions. The two activities are equivalent, but qualitatively different.

The scientific method is a functional method in the sense that relations are in terms of functions (purpose, role, its job, $E=f(C)$ etc.) What purpose is served? How do the causes, $C$, work together for function $E$ to happen?

Let us consider another reality in front of us, viz., culture. By culture, we mean the activities of human beings which are not primarily physiological or psychological but simply assertory: for example, language, art, religions, myths, science (as an activity) and economics (also as an activity). The question is, why shouldn’t the scientific method be applied to culture also? What happens when the functional method of the sciences is applied to cultural phenomenon?

Most scientists cringe at this idea but they should not. Science – or natural science – should be able to explain everything in this universe. In fact, it has been able to explain much, reaching far out into space, and go deep into physical matter as well as biological organisms, except it has left us – human organisms – in the lurch, hanging in there like an orphan. While cultural anthropology or ethnology has attempted to study and explain the culture, it ignores human being’s role in making the culture, leading to a dichotomized body and mind. It ignores much of the reality that we see every day in front of our eyes – our culture – and therefore science is incomplete. If we were to force and use the scientific method on cultures, we run into contradictions and antinomies. Percy demonstrates this with three quick examples but before that he characterizes assertions in detail.

=== Three types of assertions are recognized ===
1. Naming or classificatory assertions
  1. This is grass
  2. Certain plants which bear functional similarities towards each other because of a common phylogenetic origin we agree to designate by the symbol Gramineae
  3. An assertion involving symbolization: This round thing IS (the word) ball
2. The basic sentence
  1. Water boils at 100 °C
  2. The human heart has four chambers
  3. The basic sentence is of the form $S$ is $P$
3. The scientific law
  1. Bodies attract each other in direct proportion to the product of their masses and in inverse proportions to square of distance between them
  2. Laws of allometry which relates body parts or processes within or among living organisms, Mendel’s rules
  3. Scientific laws can be represented as $E=f(C)$, i.e., Effect is a function of Causes

Type (1) is a classificatory goal of the scientific method whereas (2) and (3) are towards establishing functional relations.

=== Characteristics of assertions ===
1. All assertions concern some real, physical, space-time event
2. Assertion itself is a pairing of elements, a relation which is not a space-time event but a kind of identity asserted by an assertor
  1. When we hear these assertions, another sequence of space-time events – namely, assertion is uttered, the sound travel through air and hit our tympanum, the waves reach the brain – all of which can be observed and measured happens. But, even if we have the exact knowledge of all the intervening events, they cannot explain how the assertion (e.g., This is grass) is understood
  2. I.e., no space-time event sequence can result in an assertory event such as utterance of “This is grass” to result in a pairing of two elements (the grass with the word grass). To put it colloquially, something magical and mysterious happens in the mind of the persons involved; it is immaterial (as in spiritual, rather than physical), in other words, it is mental.
3. That which science asserts is not itself as assertion but a real, physical, space-time event

=== Culture as a subject of the scientific method ===
Culture is a group of rules, or assertions, accepted by (or imposed on) the local people. Culture is defined as all human inheritance, material as well as cultural and spiritual, propagated via genes and memes. It includes hoes, baskets, manuscripts, monuments, language, myths, art, religions, and even science. Culture is the totality of the different ways in which the human spirit of the local people construes the world and asserts its knowledge and belief. But culture is not just assertory just like how the heart of science is not the paraphernalia of the laboratory; it is the method, the hunch, the theory, the formula or a law which is the final product and can be disseminated. Similarly, the artwork is not the paint on the canvas or the print on the page; it is the moment of creation by the artist and the moment of understanding by the viewer. Assertions are the basic, most elemental means of intersubjective communication (subjective understandings between people) used by humans and carry meanings. Culture is part of our reality which (natural) science, therefore, must explain. The objective of anthropology as a science is to understand culture as a dynamic and lawful process that is happening in our midst. The main reason scientific method has failed, as will be demonstrated later, is that culture is a mental activity which our enlightenment sciences have had problem handling and has artificially bifurcated us humans as made of mind and body. Assertions (which, incidentally, science also uses extensively) carry meaning and must be understood; they cannot be described as just space-time events.

=== Antinomies of scientific method and culture ===
Can culture be understood by the scientific method? Can the functional aspects of scientific method be applied to culture, or are there inherent limitations in the scientific method? Percy looks at three examples when the scientific method, when applied to aspects of culture, leads to contradictions – antinomies – and therefore fails.

==== The antinomy of myths ====
Jesus walked on water
Rama vanquished the ten-headed Ravana to safeguard dharma
Hunuman jumped at the sun and ate it which is why his cheeks are swollen

1. What will the scientist think about the above assertions, $S$ is $P$, when posed to him as a true-or-false claim? He will say the myths are false as they are absurd and impossible, and there is not a shred of evidence to support them, and lots of evidence against them.
2. What will the scientist think of the assertions when the assertion is itself a phenomenon under investigation by the scientist? I.e., when he studies the effect of the assertion? He is bound to say that myths are necessary for the functioning of a society; that myths influence us (good or bad is not the question) while growing up and even as adults. In that sense, myths are real. Myths are not evaluated based on true of false but based on the degree to which it serves a social or cultural function.
3. Antinomy: The contradiction is that, as an antidote to certain ills of society, the scientist must recommend some cultural values which he has labeled as false! The scientist’s motto for mental and cultural health is: It may not be true, but you better believe it because it has a tangible and observable effect on the inhabitants of that culture. The functional aspect of the myth – that it influences the society – is true, but the assertion ($S$ is $P$) is false.

==== The antinomy of language ====
What is this? Milk.
What is this [pointing at a] “round thing”? Ball.
What color is this? Blue.

1. What will the scientist think about the above assertions, S is P, when posed to him as a true-or-false-or-nonsense claim? He will say, it is true or false or nonsense subject to verification. If the white liquid is to be called milk, then fine. If you say that milk is a liquid, or that milk is a gas, or milk is upside down then, upon verification, it will be nonsense. The assertion is an agreed-upon symbolic representation between the pair, for example, the round thing and the word ball. The round thing is really not the word ball. The pair equivalency does not match any of the three type of assertions that the scientific method allows.
2. What will the scientist think of the assertions when the assertion is itself a phenomenon under investigation by the scientist? An interchange of language is not just a space-time sequence of events (movement of mouth, airwaves, mechanical vibrations, brain synapses snapping in and out), but which is meaningful only in a sociobiological sense of learned behavior. The persons in a community have been trained to respond appropriately to the space-time sequence of events. Obviously the “round thing” is not the (word) ball, but the equivalence is provided by an understanding between the utterer and the listener; it is a relation of denotation (which, BTW, is the bread and butter of science and scientists; science uses symbolic notation extensively in its daily work as well as in publishing its findings). A sentence is not a true-or-false-or-nonsense claim about the state of affairs in the world, but a comment, followed by a response, regarding the environment. It is a sociobiological signal calling for a meaning and an understanding.
3. Antinomy: Is this “round thing” the word “ball”? Is the language assertion, “$S$ is $P$”, true? Not physically real but, nevertheless, human organisms use it all the time in spoken and written forms. How did this symbolic, intentional, relation between the thing and the name happen in the first place? How is it conveyed intersubjectively between persons? How are meanings understood in the mind? The scientific method has no answers but still uses language extensively. When we listen to a lecture, most of the details we do not “get it”, but we just skim over it. Sometime later (or even immediately), we suddenly “get the gist”. So, what was the role of the language? How did the mind snap and latch to the meaning?

==== The antinomy of science ====
$T^2=KD^3$ (Kepler’s third law of planetary orbits)
$F = G \frac{m_1 m_2}{r^2}$ (Newton’s law of gravitation)
$E = mc^2$(Einstein’s mass-energy equivalency)

1. What will the scientist think about the above assertions, $S$ is $P$, when posed to him as a true-or-false-or-nonsense claim? Obviously, these assertions can be tested and verified to be true or false. Besides that, there is also a presupposition that there are things that can be known, that a degree of knowledge is possible, and that this knowledge can be expressed as assertions and reliably transmitted from teller to the hearer.
2. What will the scientist think of the assertions when the assertion is itself a phenomenon under investigation by the scientist? I.e., what does he think of science as a happening – as an activity – in the world where other happenings are happening? The scientist now must observe himself (or his scientist kith and kin) – or the science – in the service of science; he too becomes the rat, running around in the maze, making myths and cultures. Science is conducted by humans and therefore a study of science as an activity involves study of humans themselves.

Such scientists have two options, viz. (1) Applied science: their science must be meaningful, with a functional principle (good or bad is not the issue here), that can only be gauged by biological, cultural, and economic needs of the humans (sociobiological science) or (2) Pure science: scientists can do science for the sake of the pure knowledge that comes with it, as a purely semántico-logical one, looking for natural laws, refusing to deal with the intersubjectivity of human organisms, like a “private science.” Both will lead to antinomy.

1. Antinomy: The contradictions of sociobiological aspect of science (applied science) in the service of cultural and economic needs are sometimes incorrectly written away as not coming under the purview of science, that the later cannot be explained logically and rationally whereas science itself is pure dialectics (logic). The antinomy was best demonstrated in the handling of COVID-19, between President Trump and the scientists, represented by Dr. Fauci, as shutdown or not? Scientists could not put their foot down and give a definitive answer; they choose to stay out of the situation claiming to give their opinion and let economists make the final decision, but that is not a valid solution because, here, we are trying to understand why the scientific method is not global enough to include human organisms and societies!

The antinomy of the second option – of science as a pure endeavor – is also overt. A theoretical physicist studying black holes contribute “nothing” to societies on earth, thereby eliminating human organisms and societies. When a Mars landing happened, late night talk shows asked, what’s in it for me? Scientists must bend backwards to give a convincing answer, but the average person on the street (who is in the majority) is quite right – there is nothing in it for him at least in the foreseeable future.
In all of science and its assertory statements, a human being is always involved to interpret. This means the claim to “infallible knowledge” itself becomes suspect and any claim to valid knowledge by the knower, however modest it may be, is subjective. In other words, the scientific method’s presupposition that there is something to be known, that a degree of knowledge is possible, becomes questionable. As Friedrich Nietzsche said, “There is no absolute truth, only interpretations!”

=== Source of the antinomy ===
In physics, chemistry, and biological sciences (of non-human organisms), when a real, physical space-time event in which a state A results in state B happens, and it is represented by an assertory statement such as $E=f(C)$ (causes $C$ → effect $E$) or a natural law, there is no antinomy observed because the separation between the world event and the intersubjective assertion is not violated. The subject of study – rocks, planets, chemicals, germs, rats, dogs – do not butt in to reinterpret or misinterpret; they do not have a mind of their own, and scientists win.

However, when humans are the subject of study of the scientific method or when the science (science and scientific method) itself is subjected to scientific method, Percy demonstrated how assertory statements of the human organisms (exemplified by the examples of myth, language, and science itself) cannot be recognized as classificatory or functional ($E=f(C)$ or $S$ is $P$) types and leads to contradictions. The main reason is that the assertions (artwork, myths, stories, image-worlds, etc.) that humans make are real (whether they are true or false or nonsense cannot be determined and is, in fact, irrelevant) with palpable results in societies, but they are not just space-time events; they are immaterial (as in spiritual, rather than physical, lacking state changes or energy exchanges) and “mental”, i.e., in the minds of the humans involved, with meanings and understandings! The scientific method is supervenient upon the assertory acts of symbolization, which is a trademark of human beings, akin to how molecules are supervenient upon atoms. Furthermore, just like how, in molecules, some basic properties of atoms are lost, scientific method also loses some basic properties of the underlying human being. Therefore, if science alone – as it stands today – were the organon of reality and other cognitive claims denied, we end up with mind-body duality, with antinomies, and with incomplete (natural) sciences. Hence the solution begs for a radical paradigm shift in the scientific method.

=== Towards a radical anthropology ===
Once Percy recognizes that the assertory statements of human beings are the root cause leading to antinomies, he suggests the following radical change in the scientific method when it is applied to study of human beings, i.e., to anthropology.

For this, Percy’s radical proposal is to allow as eligible, all real events, not merely the space-time physical events involving energy exchanges and transformations. It should deal with all assertory statements as such on par. All assertory behavior of humans – mythic or scientific, true or false – must be commensurable with each other. Humans should be scrutinized under the microscope just like we do rats in a maze. It is the scientific method which demands “proof” for assertions, but societal reality is not so. Myths, however absurd they sound, are real and kicking. Language’s symbolic association is, if seen logically, scandalous (how can this round thing be the word ball?) but without this cosmic blunder, humans would not be human! In fact, trying to explain assertory nature of humans using scientific method’s intersubjective assertions is self-referential and is the root cause of the limitation of science in addressing culture.

The societal norm is that each human being falls in a spectral scale of individual sense of right-wrong, truth-falsity, authentic-inauthentic spread. The radical anthropology must include such normative behavior rather than the functional assertions ($E=f(C)$, causes $C$ → effect $E$) only. In addition, the normative character should be understood not just as cultural values but the very mode of existence of the asserting creature of culture. It is the cultural creature – the human being – who lives normatively.

Once all the assertions, not just functional ones, are accepted to be on the same ontological plane, the next step would be to recognize that some will allow humans to flourish and by some, he will languish. By doing so, science will have a chance to recognize potentialities for human nature and recommend which to follow and which to ditch (a recommendation that could have been useful during the COVID-19’s to lockdown or not dilemma), while an inorganic scientist (physicist or chemist) or even a biologist studying plants and animals has no such good or bad morality to grapple with. Paleontologist Stephen Gould has attempted to link religion and science as a Non-Overlapping Magisteria (NOMA) – two magisterial pillars of inquiry each addressing non-overlapping aspects of being – but Percy’s radical anthropology is overlapping and integrated.

In essence, science must view the world not as split into observers and data – i.e., those who know and those who behave and are encultured – but as an integrated unit. Science and scientists must recognize that, just like themselves, all other humans are making equally valid assertions – from their viewpoint and their culture’s point of view – about the world, in their quest for meaning, sometimes getting the answers, and sometimes falling short. Such a radical view might seem impossible, even ludicrous, but it is necessitated by the demand of science itself – paraphrasing Terrence Deacon, the scientific Theory of Everything, if of everything, cannot omit us, our feelings, meanings, consciousness, and purposes that make us what we are; we need a theory of everything that does not leave it absurd that we exist. Maturana and Varela in their book, The Tree of Knowledge, also allude to the necessity of including all of humankind into any investigations and highlight the fact that, given that each of us is unique yet must coexist in congruence, our only option is to “see the other person and open up to him room to exist besides us.” Nevertheless, Percy warns about extreme cultural relativism seeping into science, making science nonsensical!

Percy’s endeavor can be exemplified with the observation that a meta-scientific and metacultural reality exists, on top of the science and cultural symbols, that must not be forgotten or ignored which the purely scientific method tends to, due to antinomies that the current scientific method deteriorates into when dealing with humans.
