= Rosie Tran =

American comedian, actress, writer

- Born: January 11, 1984 (age 42); New Orleans, Louisiana, U.S.

Comedy career
- Medium: Stand-up
- Subjects: Racism, Stereotypes, Dating, Women's issues
- Website: www.rosietran.com

Rosie Tran (born January 11, 1984) is an American stand-up comedian, model, actress, writer, and podcast host.

== Biography ==
Tran was born and raised in the Algiers neighborhood of New Orleans, Louisiana to Vietnamese immigrants. Her father was author Tran Bich San. Her mother is a former Miss Saigon (1972) and owned a beauty and nail salon. Tran attended the academically prestigious Benjamin Franklin Senior High School and after graduation moved to Los Angeles to pursue a professional career in entertainment. She received her M.A. in Television and Film from California State University, Los Angeles.

Tran has been a featured performer at Netflix is a Joke: The Festival, The Boston International Comedy and Movie Festival, the Seattle International Comedy Competition, and headlined Hell Yes Fest in New Orleans. She is a contributing writer to various joke book series, is a regular guest on National Lampoon Comedy Radio, and is often a regular guest on many popular podcasts, including being a DeathSquad Regular. Tran was a Los Angeles area finalist on season six of the NBC show, Last Comic Standing. In 2022, Tran released a half-hour comedy special titled "The Hanoi Honey", part of the Comedy InvAsian series, on NBC Peacock.

In 2011, she began working as a featured performer on various USO tours overseas for the US military, including trips to Iraq, Kuwait, and Europe. In 2013, Tran began hosting her own podcast, "Out of the Box", where she interviews and talks with political figures and activists, internet celebrities, porn stars, comedians, artists, and other out of the box personalities and thinkers. Her podcast is a Stitcher Radio favorite, and was featured as a top new podcast.

== Personal life ==
Tran is married to crypto investor and music producer, Andrew VanVoorhis.

== Books ==
(as a contributing writer)

- She's So Funny (2004) ISBN 0-7407-4166-7
- Squeaky Clean Comedy (2005) ISBN 0-7407-5015-1
- Comedy Thesaurus (2005) ISBN 1-59474-058-5
- Love's Funny That Way (2006) ISBN 1-4027-3525-1
- The Complete Idiot's Guide to Jokes (2006) ISBN 1-59257-538-2

== Filmography (selected) ==
- A Rose Blooms in Hollywood (Documentary) (2011)
- Pound Me Too (2021)

== Television work (partial list) ==
- Inside Joke (2005)
- Breakfast, Lunch, and Dinner (2005)
- P Lo's House: The Real Entourage (2009)
- Kathy Griffin: My Life on the D-List (2010)
- Raising Hope (2014) (season 4, episode 20)
- The Swipe Life (Pilot) (2016)
- Comedy InvAsian (2022)
