= The Thanatos Syndrome =

1987 novel by Walker Percy

- First edition cover
- Author: Walker Percy
- Language: English
- Genre: Thriller novel
- Publisher: Farrar Straus & Giroux (HB) & Palandin (PB)
- Publication date: 1 April 1987
- Publication place: United States
- Media type: Print (Hardback & Paperback)
- Pages: 372 pp (hardback edition) & 384 pp (paperback edition)
- ISBN: 0-374-27354-5 (hardback edition) & ISBN 0-586-08726-5 (paperback edition)
- OCLC: 14718928
- Dewey Decimal: 813/.54 19
- LC Class: PS3566.E6912 T46 1987
- Preceded by: Love in the Ruins

The Thanatos Syndrome (1987) was Walker Percy's last novel. It is a sequel to Love in the Ruins. Set in the near future in Feliciana, it tells the story of an imprisoned psychiatrist who is freed and returns to his town with the active members demonstrating new mysterious behaviors. He suspects that something or someone is making everyone in his town crazy and reversing them to be like primitive apes.

== Plot ==
After two years in prison for selling prescription drugs, Tom More, a Louisiana psychiatrist and lapsed Catholic, comes home to his virtually defunct practice and marriage. He notices that people in his town are different, many of his patients have a strange speech to them. Many faculties are dulled but some are enhanced, particularly memory and sexual appetite.

Teaming up with his cousin Lucy, an epidemiologist who also has an independent mind, they discover that the authorities, a consortium of scientists, have been running secret trials on the population of the town. Through the addition of sodium ions to the water supply, the active population is gradually being made more chimpanzee-like, while the inactive, the old and the sick, are being euthanized. To Tom's particular disgust, the leaders of the trials are found to engage in sexual abuse of children, for which he takes his revenge by forcing them to drink high concentrations of sodium and so that they regress to apes.

A parallel plot involves a Catholic priest, Father Smith, who like Tom has hit rock bottom and almost totally failed in his calling. Together, with difficulty, the two men rediscover the hope hidden in their shaky Catholic faith.

== Themes ==
- The flawed hero. Unlike his namesake Thomas More, the physician Dr Tom More “is a far cry from the saint, drinks too much, and watches reruns of M*A*S*H on TV.” Father Smith, the priest he helps, is equally fallible in the book.
- Existential anxiety. Western medicine cannot cure the ills of its citizens: “The first character you encounter … the woman who lives at the country club and thinks she has everything and yet is in the middle of a panic attack. She is also the last person you encounter ... at the end confronting her anxiety. She is about to listen to herself tell herself something.” Existential anxiety, also known as existential angst, tends to be defined as having the regular characteristics of anxiety, but with the thought process based on our existence and purpose in life. `
- Ecological degradation linked to human regression. Natural beauty is ruined by human activity: “ ... the Louisiana of the novel is an ecological mess .... it shows the peculiar indifference of the strange new breed of Louisianians in the novel. After all, chimp-like creatures do not generally form environmental protection societies.”
- A world gone mad. Humans in Western countries have lost their grip on reality: “But the world is also deranged … The looniness …. of the 'normal' denizen of the Western world who …. doesn’t know who he is, what he believes, or what he is doing.”
- Breakdown of communication. People consistently fail to understand each other: “... some literary critics, philosophers, and semioticians … seem hell-bent on denying the very qualities of language and literature that have been held in such high esteem in the past: namely, that it is possible to know something about the world, that the world actually exists, that one person can actually say or write about the world and that other people can understand him. That, in a word, communication is possible.”
- Decline of the West. Mentally, Western society is moribund. Percy sees the USA “gradually subside into decay through default and be defeated ... from within by weariness, boredom, cynicism, greed, and in the end helplessness before its great problems” while the West is “losing by spiritual acedia”.
- Devaluation of humanity by science. In the book, Percy is angered by “the widespread and ongoing devaluation of human life in the Western world” which he ascribes to two mindsets: “ Thou shalt not find anything unique about the human animal even if the evidence points to such uniqueness” and “Thou shalt not suggest that there is a unique and fatal flaw in 'Homo sapiens sapiens' or indeed any perverse trait that cannot be laid to the influence of Western civilization”. He contends that humans are unique in being both God-like and tainted by original sin.
- Bad faith leads to bad outcomes. Percy portrays fatal errors in both religious fundamentalists and secular humanists, commenting: “It is easy to criticize the absurdities of fundamentalist beliefs like 'scientific creationism' — that the world and its creatures were created six thousand years ago. But it is also necessary to criticize other dogmas parading as science and the bad faith of some scientists who have their own dogmatic agendas to promote under the guise of 'free scientific inquiry'. Scientific inquiry should in fact be free. The warning: If it is not, if it is subject to this or that ideology, then do not be surprised if .. history … is repeated. Weimar leads to Auschwitz. The nihilism of some scientists in the name of ideology or sentimentality and the consequent devaluation of individual human life leads straight to the gas chamber.”

== List of characters ==
- Thomas More: The main character of the novel. He was put in jail for the distribution of pharmaceutical drugs for two years; once he is released on parole he goes back to the city to find things are different, specifically the behavior of the individuals. He is a psychiatrist and a failed Catholic. His female patients begin trying to make sexual advances with him, which he considers to be strange and bizarre. He witnesses his wife change from a dull conservative to a really good contract bridge player.
- Ellen Oglethorpe More: She is Thomas More's longstanding wife and nurse; her personality changes drastically throughout the novel due to the sodium ions in the water supply that is affecting the individuals in the population. She is someone who changes during the text to a more ape-like existence. She is essential to Thomas More's epiphany about the situation going on in their town. Ellen and his patients were the key to this realization.
- Lucy Lipscomb: She is Thomas More's cousin and for this reason he gets in contact with her about the problems he sees. She is an epidemiologist and because of this she feels she could be useful in the investigation of the absurdities happening in the town. His work in figuring out who is behind the scheme in the town heavily relies on her access to government-locked information. She also felt something was morally incorrect about the forced reduction of crimes rates, along with other things, through the addition of sodium ions.
