= Walker Percy: The Last Catholic Novelist =

Walker Percy: The Last Catholic Novelist is a book about the novels of Walker Percy. It was written by Kieran Quinlan.
