= Stanley Kauffmann =

American author, editor, and critic (1916–2013)

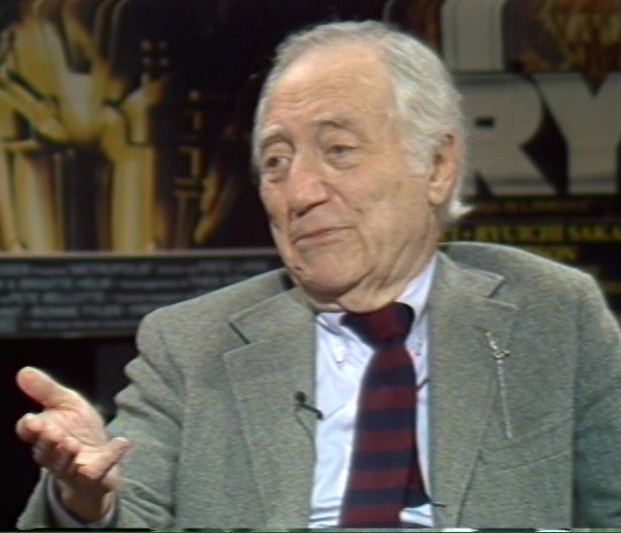
- Kauffman on CUNY TV's Cinema Then, Cinema Now (1989)
- Born: April 24, 1916; New York City, New York, U.S.
- Died: October 9, 2013 (aged 97); New York City, New York, U.S.
- Occupations: Critic, editor, writer, educator
- Spouse: Laura Cohen (m. 1943; died 2012)

Stanley Kauffmann (April 24, 1916 – October 9, 2013) was an American writer, editor, and critic of film and theater.

== Career ==
Kauffmann started with The New Republic in 1958 and contributed film criticism to that magazine for the next 55 years, publishing his last review in 2013. He had one brief break in his New Republic tenure, when he served as the drama critic for The New York Times for eight months in 1966.

He worked as an acquisitions editor at Ballantine Books in 1953, where he acquired the novel Fahrenheit 451 by Ray Bradbury. Several years later, while working as an editor at Alfred A. Knopf in 1959 he discovered a manuscript by Walker Percy, The Moviegoer. Following a year of rewrites and revisions, the novel was published in 1961, and it won a National Book Award in 1962.

Stanley electrified educated people with the news that movies had become one of the high arts again, and that there were contemporary works—by Bergman, Truffaut, Antonioni, and many other directors—the equal of the masterpieces of the silent era.

— David Denby, "Stanley Kauffmann Tribute: 'A Masterpiece Every Week!'", The New Republic, October 9, 2013

Kauffmann was a long-time advocate and enthusiast of foreign film, helping to introduce and popularize in America the works of directors such as Ingmar Bergman, François Truffaut, Claude Chabrol, and Yasujirō Ozu. He inspired and influenced younger film and cultural critics such as Roger Ebert and David Denby.

Kauffmann was also a professor of English, Drama, and Film at City University of New York (Hunter College, York College, and the Graduate Center) (1973–76) and taught at the Yale School of Drama.

Kauffmann was featured in the 2009 documentary For the Love of Movies: The Story of American Film Criticism where he was shown discussing the beginnings of film criticism in America, and noting the important contributions of poet Vachel Lindsay, who grasped that "the arrival of film was an important moment in the history of human consciousness".

Kauffmann is noted for his dissenting opinions on otherwise critically acclaimed films, giving negative reviews for Brazil, Star Wars, Raiders of the Lost Ark, The Godfather, Million Dollar Baby, Gone with the Wind, Becket, Taxi Driver, and 2001: A Space Odyssey, films that were heavily praised by other notable critics.

== Personal life ==
Kauffmann attended DeWitt Clinton High School in the Bronx and New York University, where he received a Bachelor of Fine Arts in 1935, and he was an actor and stage manager with NYU's 1920s–30s revival of the Washington Square Players. Kauffmann married Laura Cohen in 1943, and they remained together until Cohen's death in 2012. They did not have children. Kauffmann died of pneumonia at St. Luke's Hospital in Manhattan on October 9, 2013, at age 97.

== Books on criticism ==
- Regarding Film: Criticism and Comment. Baltimore: Johns Hopkins University Press (2001).
- Distinguishing Features: Film Criticism and Comment. Baltimore: Johns Hopkins University Press (1994).
- Field of View: Film Criticism and Comment. New York: Performing Arts Journal Publications (1986).
- Theater Criticisms. New York: Performing Arts Journal Publications (1986).
- Albums of Early Life. New Haven: Ticknor & Fields (1980).
- Before My Eyes: Film Criticism and Comment. New York: Harper & Row (1980).
- Persons of the Drama: Theater Criticism and Comment. New York: Harper & Row (1976).
- Living Images: Film Comment and Criticism. New York: Harper & Row (1975).
- American Film Criticism: From the Beginnings to "Citizen Kane"; Reviews of Significant Films at the Time They First Appeared [Editor, with Bruce Henstell]. New York: Liveright (1972).
- Figures of Light: Film Criticism and Comment. New York: Harper & Row (1971).
- A World on Film: Criticism and Comment. New York: Harper & Row (1966).
