= The Last Gentleman =

The Last Gentleman may refer to:

- The Last Gentleman (film), a 1934 film produced by 20th Century Pictures
- The Last Gentleman (novel), a 1966 novel by the US author Walker Percy
