= Message in a bottle (disambiguation) =

A message in a bottle is a form of communication whereby a message is sealed in a container and released into a body of water.

Message in a bottle may also refer to:

== Film and television ==
- Message in a Bottle (film), a 1999 adaptation of the Nicholas Sparks novel (see below)
- "Message in a Bottle" (Baywatch), a 1989 TV episode
- "Message in a Bottle" (Knots Landing), a 1984 TV episode
- "Message in a Bottle" (Star Trek: Voyager), a 1998 TV episode
- "Message in a Bottle" (Stargate SG-1), a 1998 TV episode

== Literature ==
- Message in a Bottle (novel), a 1998 novel by Nicholas Sparks
- The Message in the Bottle, a 1975 collection of essays by Walker Percy

== Music ==
- Message in a Bottle (album), by JJ Lin, 2017
- "Message in a Bottle" (The Police song), 1979
- "Message in a Bottle" (Taylor Swift song), 2021
- "Message in a Bottle", a song by Ty Dolla Sign from Beach House 3, 2017

== See also ==
- "MS. Found in a Bottle", an 1833 short story by Edgar Allan Poe
- The Letter in the Bottle, a 2006 nonfiction book by Karen Liebreich
