= Peter Dombourian =

American music educator and conductor

Peter Mampreh Dombourian (March 24, 1920 - January 13, 1992), was active in musical circles in New Orleans, Louisiana, as a music educator, conductor, and musician.

== Early life ==
Peter was the third of four sons of Mampreh Bedros Dombourian (1884–1950), a successful Oriental rug merchant, and Zartouhi Bedrossian Dombourian (1892–1958). Both parents were born in Ichme, Turkey. His paternal grandfather, Bedros Dombourajian, was killed by the Turks in 1898. Mampreh immigrated to the United States in 1904, establishing his rug business in New Orleans in 1910. In 1911, Mampreh brought Zartouhi to the United States. Mampreh helped numerous family members escape Armenia to the United States. Peter and his brothers (Vartan, Masis, and Robert) were raised by their extended Armenian family in New Orleans.

== Music education career ==
Dombourian was best known as a music educator. He earned Bachelor's and master's degrees in Music Education from Louisiana State University, with an interruption to serve as an Army battery officer from 1942 to 1946. In recognition of his positive influence on music education in Louisiana, Peter was awarded an Honorary Doctor of Humane Letters degree by the University of New Orleans in December, 1989; and the Orleans Parish School Board established the Peter Dombourian Music Hall of Fame in 2004.

Dombourian began his career as band director at Behrman High School in Algiers, Louisiana in 1946, but became band director at his alma mater, Fortier High School, in the fall of 1947. He continued in that position until 1970, except for a brief stint as an Army battalion adjutant during the Korean War. He also served as band director at John F. Kennedy High School (1971 – 1974). Beginning in 1974, he served as Supervisor of Music for the Orleans Parish School Board. During his term as Music Supervisor, he inaugurated the music program at Benjamin Franklin High School, where he remained as the part-time band director and music teacher until 1991, when he stepped down for health reasons. Wynton Marsalis, Dombourian's band student at Franklin High School, said of him: "He had a love for music; always encouraged me to play; gave me a chance to play. He knew a lot of music, too."

In 1964, Dombourian was selected as one of the nation's 10 Most Outstanding Band Directors by The School Musician magazine. His Fortier High School bands captured Superior ratings from the Louisiana Music Educators Association for 20 consecutive years, and were invited to play concerts at the Washington D.C. Cherry Blossom Festival, the New York World's Fair, Expo '67 in Montreal, Hemis-Fair '68 in San Antonio, and Expo '70 in Osaka, Japan. His Kennedy and Franklin High bands played concerts at Walt Disney World and the Mexican International Festival in Mexico City.

Dombourian was the first high school band director elected to membership in the prestigious American Bandmasters Association. During his career, he served as President of the Louisiana Music Educators Association, Convention Chairman for the Louisiana Music Educators National Conference and for the American Bandmasters’ convention, President of the Beta Omega chapter of Phi Mu Alpha, President of the LSU Music Alumni Association, President of the Louisiana chapter of Phi Beta Mu, and State Chairman of the National Band Association. In 1986, he was named to the Louisiana Music Educators Association Hall of Fame.

== New Orleans music scene ==
He also was a member of such professional organizations as the American Federation of Musicians, the American School Band Directors Association, the American String Teachers Association, and the Music Teachers National Association. Dombourian's knowledge of local musicians and their regard for his musical and managerial abilities combined to make him an excellent organizer as well as a conductor. Summers weren't complete in New Orleans without the Summer Pops Concerts, which he co-founded and for which he served as conductor and treasurer. He served for 20 years as music director for Le Petit Theatre du Vieux Carré and conducted the New Orleans Civic Symphony. In 1975 he founded the New Orleans Concert Band, which performed at both the New Orleans and Vancouver World's Fairs, and which continues to flourish (www.neworleansconcertband.org).

One of the personal highlights of Dombourian's career was conducting the world premiere of “Songs of Ararat,” a work for concert band by Loris Chobanian, in December, 1990. The work, commissioned by Peter's students and friends in honor of his 70th birthday, was premiered by the New Orleans Concert Band.

== Guest conducting ==
Dombourian's success led to many guest conducting appearances around the globe, including the Sony Band in Tokyo, the Prefecture of Police Band in Paris, the U. S. Marine Band, the U.S. Army Field Band, and the U.S. Air Force Band. He was also guest conductor for the New Orleans Philharmonic Symphony Orchestra, the Louisiana All-State Orchestra, the Governor's Honor Orchestra, and the Louisiana Music Educators’ Honors Band.

== Musical performance ==
Peter's principal musical instruments were the viola and the flute. He performed with the New Orleans Ballet, the New Orleans Summer Pops Orchestra, the Saenger Theater Orchestra, and the University Of New Orleans Opera Orchestra, among others.

== Personal life ==
Dombourian was a long-time deacon of St. Charles Avenue Baptist Church and a board member of the Rotary Club of New Orleans. He was married for 45 years to Joyce Boyle Dombourian; they had two daughters, Joyce Markrid and Zartouhi (who is a noted piccoloist), and two granddaughters, Julienne and Joycelyn Eby.
