= Jeffery Miller =

American musician, composer, and bandleader

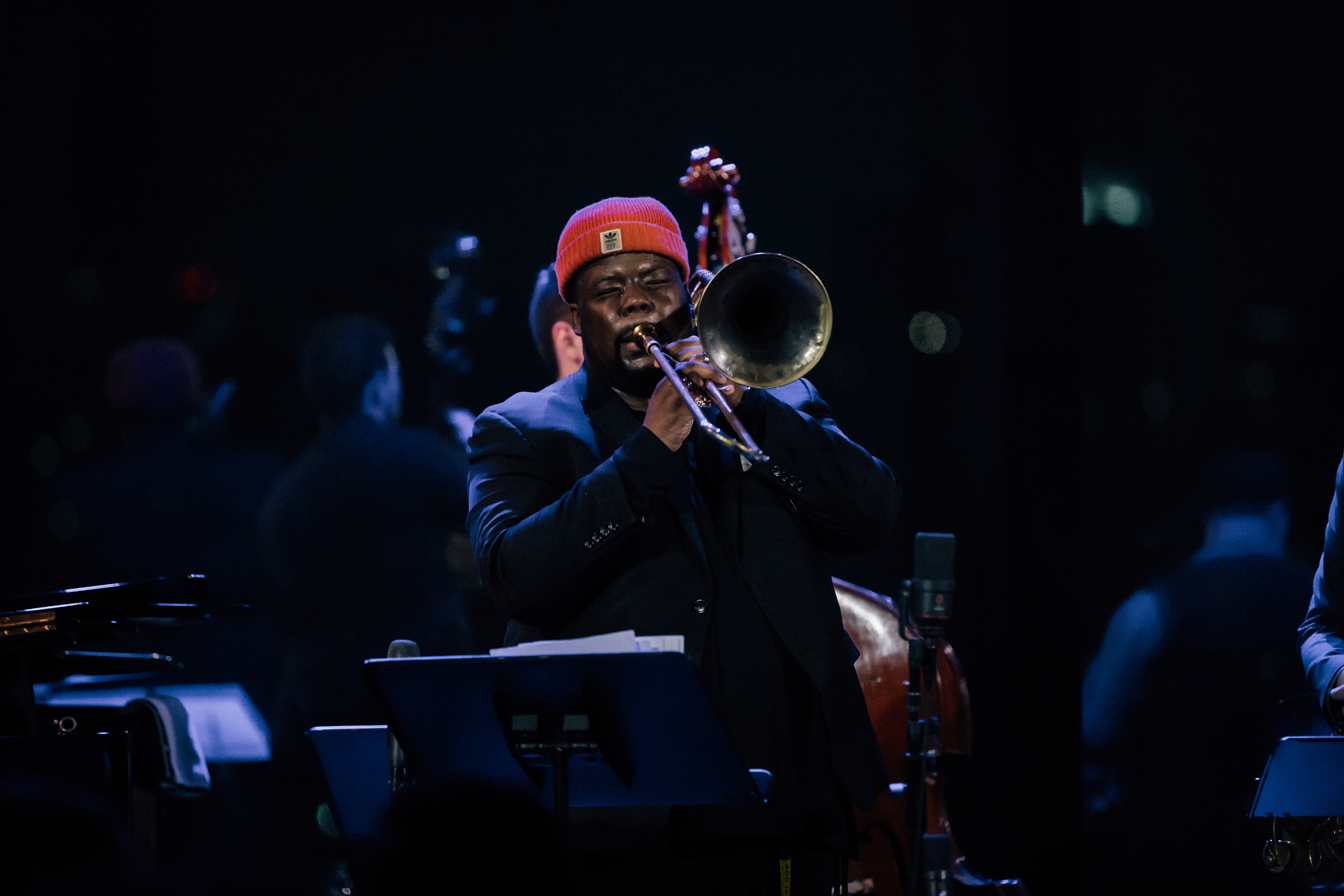
- Miller performing at Jazz at Lincoln Center, March 2019

Background information
- Born: Jeffery Oliver Miller; February 9, 1996 (age 30); New Orleans, Louisiana, U.S.
- Genres: Jazz, pop, R&B
- Occupation: Musician
- Instruments: Trombone, vocals
- Website: jefferymillermusic.com

Jeffery Oliver Miller (born February 9, 1996) is an American trombonist, vocalist, composer, arranger and bandleader primarily known for his work in jazz and pop music. He has worked with Delfeayo Marsalis, Wynton Marsalis, Jon Batiste & Stay Human, Preservation Hall Jazz Band and John Legend, among others.

== Early life ==
Miller was born and raised in the Algiers neighborhood (15th Ward) of New Orleans, where he was exposed to jazz culture and history. He is the great-great grandnephew of Papa John Joseph, a New Orleans bass player who worked with Buddy Bolden. Joseph died during a performance of "When the Saints Go Marching In" with the Preservation Hall Jazz Band.

Miller sang at home and church from an early age. Although initially drawn to the drumset, Miller began to study the trombone around age ten or eleven, inspired by his middle school band director Keith Hart. He progressed quickly and impressed professional trombonist Terrance Taplin, who encouraged Delfeayo Marsalis to audition Miller for his Uptown Jazz Orchestra. After sitting-in with the group at New Orleans' famed jazz club Snug Harbor, Miller joined the group at age 14.

He studied academics at Benjamin Franklin High School and music at New Orleans Center for Creative Arts. While a sophomore in high school, he performed with the Preservation Hall Jazz Band at Carnegie Hall.

During high school, he appeared for three seasons of the HBO series Treme, in which he played a student of Antoine Batiste, the fictional trombonist depicted by Wendell Pierce.

In 2013, Miller was selected as one of twelve younger musicians to participate in the Vail Jazz Workshop in Vail, Colorado. The experience solidified his desire to pursue music as a lifelong calling.

In 2014, Miller was chosen to be in the 2014 GRAMMY Band, a program that selected high school students from across the United States to perform during GRAMMY Week.

== Musical career ==
Miller moved to New York City in 2014 to study at The Juilliard School where he completed both undergraduate and master's degrees. During his early years in New York, he also toured with the trumpeter Wynton Marsalis, the Count Basie Orchestra as well as Canadian indie rock band Arcade Fire.

Miller released the single "Lose Control" in summer 2018. The track draws heavily on diverse influences including hip-hop, jazz, and R&B.

He recorded on Jon Batiste's studio album Hollywood Africans as well as contributed trombone solos to John Legend's Grammy-nominated A Legendary Christmas (featuring Esperanza Spalding). He joined both Legend and Spalding to perform "Have Yourself A Merry Little Christmas" on NBC's The Voice.

In May 2020, he released his album Songs About Women, on which he both sang and played trombone alongside saxophonist Chris Bittner, pianist Sean Mason, drummer Brian Richburg Jr., and bassist Philip Norris. The album focused on compositions about and dedicated to women who raised and inspired him, including his grandmother, Patricia, and twin sister, Justice. That fall, Miller composed music for a re-imagined rendition of Shakespeare's Measure for Measure. The production was set in 1979 New Orleans, and directed by L.A. Williams and The Public Theater's Mobile Unit.

Jeffery can also be seen with fellow Juilliard alum Endea Owens as a part of her feature on NPR Tiny Desk in 2022.

He has been a frequent member of pianist Jon Batiste's house band on The Late Show with Stephen Colbert on CBS, the Christian McBride Big Band and has performed with the Louisiana Philharmonic Orchestra, among others.

== Awards ==
- ASCAP Foundation Louis Prima Award
- GRAMMY Nomination - Saint James Infirmary (Jon Batiste, 201)
- GRAMMY Nomination - A Legendary Christmas (John Legend, 2020)
- GRAMMY Nomination – Migration Series (Derek Bermel, 2020)

== Discography ==
=== As leader ===
Album artist	Title	Year	Label
Jeffery Miller	Time In	2022	Independent
Jeffery Miller	Permanent Stains (P.S)	2021	Independent
Jeffery Miller	Songs About Women (Live at Dizzy's)	2020	Independent
Jeffery Miller	Lose Control	2018	Independent

=== As sideman ===
Album artist	Title	Year	Label
John Legend (feat. Esperanza Spalding)	A Legendary Christmas	2018	Columbia
Jon Batiste	Hollywood Africans	2018	Verve
Molly Chapman	No Trust	2017	Independent
Delfeayo Marsalis	Make America Great Again!	2016	Troubadour Jass Records
