= Trần Bích San =

Vietnamese scholar

Trần Bích San (陳璧山, 1840–1877) was a Vietnamese scholar and writer. The New Orleans–based Vietnamese writer Tran Bich San is his great-grandson.
