= E. Eean McNaughton =

American architect (1931–2019)

- Born: October 12, 1931; New Orleans, Louisiana, U.S.
- Died: June 4, 2019 (aged 87); New Orleans, Louisiana, U.S.
- Education: Bachelor of Architecture, Tulane University, 1955; North Dakota State University, 1963
- Occupations: Architect, educator
- Spouse: Joan McNaughton (1931-)
- Awards: 1995 AIA Honor Award; 1988 2010 Medal of Honor; Golden Girder award Vieux Carre Courier 1972
- Website: Works

E. Eean McNaughton (October 12, 1931 - June 4, 2019) was an American architect and professor of architecture.

== Early life ==
McNaughton was born in 1931, son of Eean Eugene McNaughton and Mary Elizabeth (Ellis) McNaughton, in New Orleans, Louisiana.

He attended Tulane University where he obtained a Bachelor of Architecture in 1955.

== Career ==
McNaughton designed over fifty buildings, structures and interior remodels. He was involved in historic renovations and preservation throughout the state of Louisiana over a career spanning more than five decades. His work has been described as memorable, notable and key in the preservation of historic structures that were instrumental in American history.

McNaughton's works include schools, government buildings, and private and public residences. One example is Benjamin Franklin High School. One preservation example is the restoration and preservation of the Old Louisiana State Capitol. He was key in planning and architecture in preparation for natural disasters.
