= Lancelot (novel) =

1977 novel by Walker Percy

- First edition
- Author: Walker Percy
- Language: English
- Publisher: Farrar, Straus & Giroux, McGraw-Hill Ryerson
- Publication date: 1977
- Publication place: United States
- Pages: 257 (first edition)
- ISBN: 9780374183134

Lancelot is a 1977 novel by the American author Walker Percy.

== Overview and Themes ==
A dejected lawyer, Lancelot Lamar, murders his wife after discovering that he is not the father of her youngest daughter, Siobhan. He ends up in a mental institution, where his story is told through his reflections and monologues on his disturbing past, thus having him serve as an unreliable narrator. The novel compares the protagonist unfavorably to his namesake, Sir Lancelot, as he experiences a vision of an empty and decadent modern American culture which invokes the symbolism of the mythical Wasteland. Lamar's quest to expose this moral emptiness is a transposition of the quest for the Holy Grail; as he witnesses and records the increasing moral depravity of his wife and daughter during the filming of a Hollywood movie, he becomes obsessed with and corrupted by the immorality he seeks to condemn.

The novel is replete with Arthurian references. Most obviously, it includes characters named after Lancelot, Merlin, and Percival. Despite his name, Lancelot Andrewes Lamar seems partly based on King Arthur: like Arthur, he is cuckolded; like Arthur, he wants to build a new order. Through this monologue, the reader learns Lancelot Lamar's view of the world. He makes accusations, but also questions his own accusations, knowing his own limited ability to view things with clarity and objectivity. He sees that there is a problem with modern American culture. Lancelot seeks to create a New Order based on his own code of honor, and this code of honor includes the preferred actions and roles of women and an avoidance of self-knowledge. He hopes to start this "Third Revolution" (the first two being the American Revolution and the American Civil War, respectively) with a female mental patient and gang rape victim in the cell next to him, Anna. He sees her as having a restored innocence, because she has been violated so completely. Lancelot sees himself as a leader among other male leaders in his New Order, and other citizens will be followers. He will be part of an elite group that has knowledge of the world like himself.

Lancelot's monologue also serves to develop themes such as the importance of innocence in sexual identity and the issues concerning human sexuality. These are seen in his commentary of when he sees Lucy, his daughter, as she engages in sexual activity with the two lead actors in Merlin's movie, Troy Dana and Raine Robinette. It is also seen in observation of his wife's infidelity, and in his comparisons of his first wife, Lucy, to his second wife, Margot. Lancelot also values innocence in the rape victim, Anna, who resides in the room next to his in the mental institution.

== Reception ==
Christopher Lehmann-Haupt of The New York Times gave the novel a negative review. He felt it was "bitter," "provocative," and "upsetting." He criticized the narrative voice for being "uneven and unconvincing," and the story for "[relying] on a melodrama that has little fictional resonance." He also took issue with the characters' Arthurian-inspired names, likening this to "merely...an elbow in the ribs." Lehman-Haupt ultimately felt the story was "a portrait of a philosophical quest rather than an argument for the quest's objectives."
