= The Second Coming (Percy novel) =

1980 novel by Walker Percy

- First edition cover (Farrar, Straus & Giroux)
- Author: Walker Percy
- Language: English
- Publisher: Farrar, Straus and Giroux
- Publication date: 1980
- Dewey Decimal: 813.54
- LC Class: PS3566.E6912 S4

The Second Coming is a 1980 novel by Walker Percy. It is a sequel to The Last Gentleman. It tells the story of middle-aged Will Barrett and his relationship with Allison, a young woman who has escaped from a mental hospital. The book was nominated for the National Book Critics Circle Award in 1980.

Much of the novel is presented through the unspoken—but printed—dialogue of Will Barrett, the main character, with himself and with people from his past. He works his way through his memories and comes to realize that he suffers from the same affliction as his father: the belief that life—as most people, including himself, live it—is worse than death. His father’s solution was suicide, as were the choices of Percy’s own father and grandfather, but he also attempted to kill Will, believing it would spare him the despair he knew would come. Will reflects on these events throughout the book.

Barrett decides he will put God to the test. He will enter a cave near his home in North Carolina, telling no one what he is doing but leaving notes in case he does not return, and take barbiturates until God proves His existence and love by saving him, or he dies, thus demonstrating God does not exist. After a literal dark night of the soul, at the end of which he is roused from his drugged stupor by the shooting pain of an abscessed tooth, he is figuratively reborn, falling out of the cavern and into the care of a woman who is a refugee from an insane asylum. While he cannot escape his past, she can live only in the present, her memory erased by prior electroshock therapy. Two maimed and incomplete people come together and somehow make each other whole, and Will Barrett is, however briefly, redeemed through love of and with another. The book offers a remarkable depiction of the human struggle with faith.

This work contains Percy's musings on "ravening particles," a reference to the alienation and anomie the individual feels from both within and without in the absence of faith.

== Film adaptation ==
In March 2023, it was announced that Aaron Magnani optioned the screen rights for a film adaptation, with Magnani as producer and Peter Arneson adapting the script.
