= Tran Bich San (US writer) =

Vietnamese writer (1940–2021)

Trần Bích San
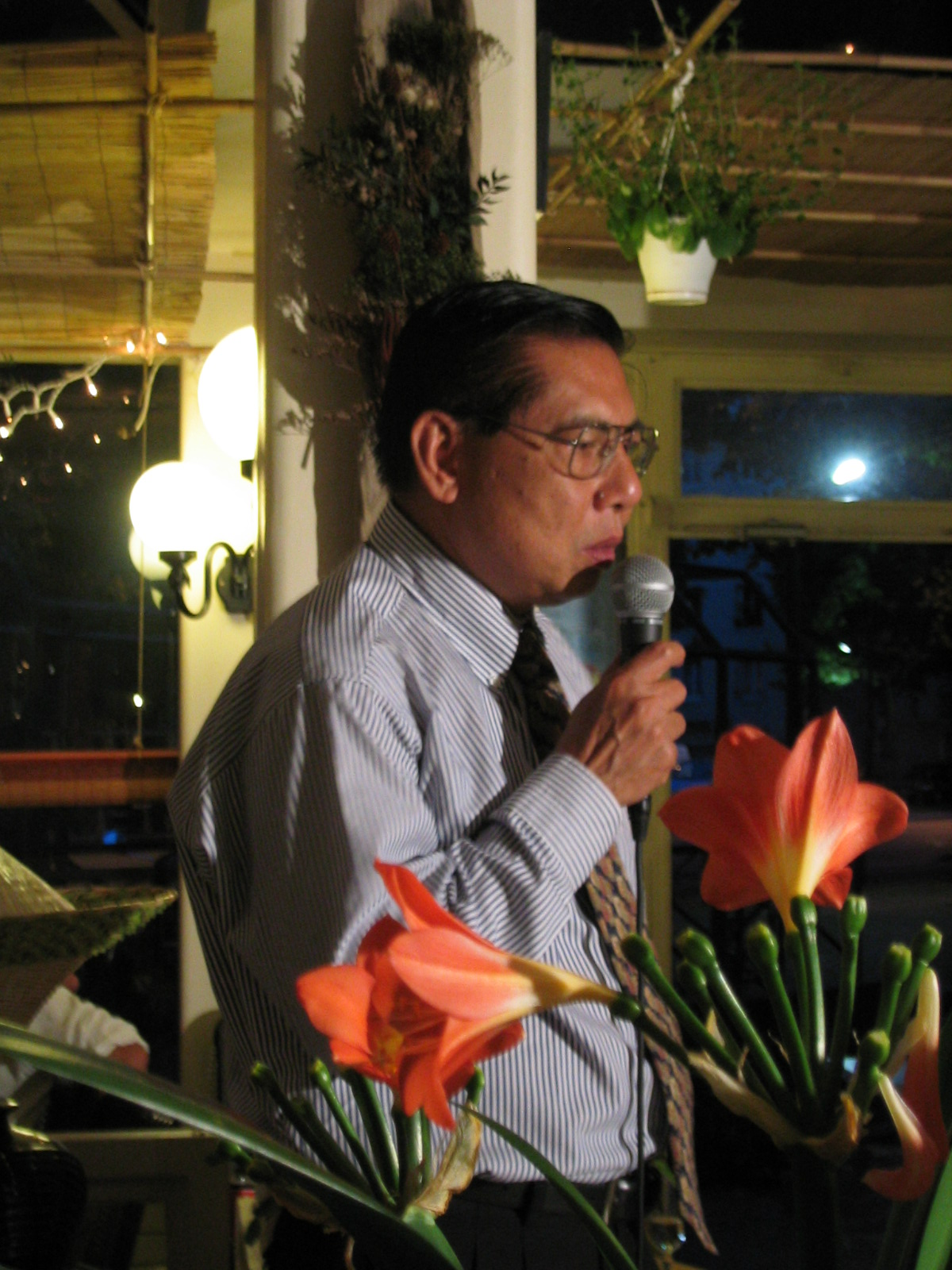
- Tran Bich San speaking in Paris, France.
- Born: Trần Gia Thái; October 10, 1940; Sung Van, Nam Dinh, Vietnam
- Died: January 9, 2021; New Orleans, Louisiana
- Occupation: Writer

Trần Gia Thái, pen name Trần Bích San (October 10, 1940 - January 9, 2021) was a Vietnamese writer.

== Biography ==
=== Early life ===
Tran was born Trần Gia Thái in the village of Sung Van in the Nam Dinh region of Vietnam. His mother owned a bookstore, and his father was chief of the district and later became an administrator. In 1966, Tran married Nguyen Yen Mai, a student of the Marie Curie School in Saigon. They had a son, Tran Quoc Quan, and later divorced in 1971.

After his graduation from the Thu Duc Academy (1969), Tran joined the Army of the Republic of Vietnam and became the Chief of Press in the 5th Infantry Division. He quickly moved up in the ranks, becoming the Chief of Administrative Security, Press, and Information Ministry.

During his time in the military, Tran was known for writing many hard hitting articles criticizing the Viet Cong and the North Vietnamese government. He also worked in a special unit interrogating captured Viet Cong soldiers.

=== Post-Vietnam ===
Tran emigrated to the U.S. territory of Guam following the Fall of Saigon. He was temporarily moved to Fort Chaffee, Arkansas for six months and soon found sponsorship with a Lutheran church in Arlington County, Virginia. He worked for six months as a dishwasher for Episcopal High School (Alexandria). On July 4, 1976, Tran entered his second marriage with a fellow refugee, Loan Kim Ta. They met at a party in Washington, D.C. for Vietnamese refugees. Ta was a law student at Bovie Community College and the former Miss Saigon (1972).

The couple had three daughters and divorced in 2005, following Hurricane Katrina.

=== Professional career ===
Tran decided to go back to school and in 1979, he received his B.S. in Biomedical Engineering from George Washington University. He later received a Master's in Healthcare Administration from Tulane University (1995).

Tran and his wife moved to New Orleans, Louisiana, in June 1979 after he was offered an entry-level job at Touro Infirmary, a private Jewish hospital. He was promoted to senior engineer (1982), and eventually headed up the department as the director of biomedical engineering (1990).

In 1995, Tran Bich San became the editor of the New Orleans branch of The Little Saigon News, a bilingual newspaper for Vietnamese Americans. While in New Orleans, he also authored hundreds of articles on Vietnamese culture and literature. His work has been featured in Vietnamese magazines such as Có Thóm (Washington, D.C.), Tan Van, (California), and Ngày Mới, (Paris, France). Tran is the co-founder of the Vietnamese political activist website Viet Thuc.org.

He was considered a strong political force, representing the voice of the Little Saigon region of New Orleans. Louisiana Senator Mary Landrieu and former New Orleans' mayor Marc Morial both utilized Tran during their elections to secure support in the Asian community.

Tran adopted the pen name Trần Bích San after his great, great grandfather who was the top honor graduate of the national exam in 1865 and a famous 19th century poet in Vietnamese literature. He chose the name to continue his ancestor's unfinished work in literature and honor the last official Vietnamese scholar of the 19th century.

== Books ==
- Van Khao (2000)
- Giai Thoai Van Chuong (2006)
- Nao Nuc Hoi Trang Ram (2007)
