= Lost in the Cosmos =

1983 mock self-help book by Walker Percy

- First edition
- Author: Walker Percy
- Language: English
- Publisher: Farrar, Straus & Giroux
- Publication date: 1983

Lost in the Cosmos: The Last Self-Help Book is a mock self-help book by Walker Percy, published in 1983 by Farrar Straus & Giroux.

Organized into roughly four sections that explore ideas of the self, Percy's thesis is that the social ills which plague society are a result of humanity's epic identity crisis. Percy uses semiotic theories (the theories of signs) to argue that human consciousness of the self is unique from all other 'interactions' in the universe in that it is triadic. It requires two sets of dyadic interactions between that of the sign user, the sign, and what the sign stands for in order to be complete. As a result, persons are thrust into the predicament of finding a sign that 'places' themselves.

The book contains numerous essays, quizzes, and "thought experiments" designed to satirize conventional self-help texts while provoking readers to undertake a thoughtful contemplation of their existential situations and the search for meaning and purpose that could derive from such reflections.

== Reception ==
According to Andrew Hoogheem, it is:

easily Walker Percy's strangest book. On its surface a darkly humorous parody of the literature of self-help, this late work… runs the reader down a gauntlet of multiple-choice questions… whose cumulative effect is to leave her more bereft of answers than when she began. Along the way it conjures up dialogues between talk show hosts and long-dead theologians, inveigles its readers into seriously contemplating suicide, shoulders in on the debates of academic semioticians, presents an overview of world history that predicts World War III erupting as a consequence of Western anomie, and arrives at its denouement by way of… science fiction stories of nuclear war and alien encounters.

The book is a favorite of the philosopher Peter Kreeft, of Boston College, and a lecture on the subject appears on his personal website.
