= James Nolan (author) =

American poet

- Born: September 3, 1947 (age 78); New Orleans, Louisiana, U.S.
- Education: University of California, Berkeley

James Nolan (born September 3, 1947. Died August 22, 2025) was a poet, fiction writer, essayist, and translator. A regular contributor to Boulevard, his work has appeared in New Orleans Noir (Akashic Books), Utne Reader, The Washington Post, Poetry, and Southern Review, among other magazines, anthologies, and newspapers. He has translated the work of Spanish-language poets Pablo Neruda and Jaime Gil de Biedma. Nolan is a fifth-generation native of New Orleans and lives in the French Quarter.

== Career ==
Nolan received his PhD from the University of California (Berkeley and Santa Cruz) and has gone on to teach Literature and Creative Writing at universities in Florida, San Francisco, Barcelona, Madrid, and Beijing. Until recently, he was the Writer-in-Residence at New Orleans' Tulane and Loyola Universities, where he directed the Loyola Writing Institute for 12 years. He later went on to teach creative writing at the Arts Council of New Orleans.

He has been the recipient of a National Endowment of the Arts grant, a Javits Fellowship in the Humanities, and two Fulbright Fellowships. His collection of short stories, Perpetual Care, won the 2007 Jefferson Press Prize and the 2009 Next-Generation Indie Book Award for Best Short Story Collection. Nolan was awarded the 2008 Faulkner–Wisdom Gold Medal in the novel category for the manuscript of his first novel Higher Ground, and his most recent short story collection, You Don't Know Me, won the 2015 Independent Publishers Gold Medal in Southern Fiction. In 2017, he published a memoir titled Flight Risk: Memoirs of a New Orleans Bad Boy, honored with the 2018 Next Generation Indie Book Award for Best Memoir. About Flight Risk, the novelist Alexander McCall Smith has written that "James Nolan's memoir is vivid, entertaining, and utterly memorable, one of the most enjoyable reads that has come my way for a very long time." Andrei Codrescu writes that Flight Risk "looks back unsparingly on a time few writers have faced with such clarity and compassion. There's suspense and beauty on every page." Nolan's most recent book is Nasty Water: Collected New Orleans Poems, which contains fifty poems written over the past fifty years focused on his native city.

== Works ==
=== Poetry ===
- Why I Live In The Forest, Wesleyan University Press, 1974 (ISBN 0-8195-1074-2)
- What Moves Is Not The Wind, Wesleyan University Press, 1980 (ISBN 0-8195-1099-8)
- Drunk on Salt, Willow Springs Editions, 2015 (ISBN 978-0-9832317-4-5)
- Nasty Water: Collected New Orleans Poems, University of Louisiana at Lafayette Press, 2018 (ISBN 978-1-946160-35-5)

=== Poetry in translation ===
- Pablo Neruda, Stones Of The Sky, Copper Canyon Press, 2002 (ISBN 1-5565-9006-7)
- Jaime Gil de Biedma, Longing: Selected Poems, City Lights Books, 1993 (ISBN 1-55659-170-5)

=== Fiction ===
- Perpetual Care: Stories, Jefferson Press, 2008 (ISBN 0-9800-1641-X)
- Higher Ground: A Novel, University of Louisiana at Lafayette Press, 2011 (ISBN 978-1-891053-52-8)
- You Don't Know Me: New and Selected Stories, University of Louisiana at Lafayette Press, 2015 (ISBN 978-1-935754-34-3)

=== Essays and criticism ===
- Poet-Chief: The Native American Poetics of Walt Whitman and Pablo Neruda, University of New Mexico Press, 1994, (ISBN 0-8263-1484-8)
- Fumadores en manos de un dios enfurecido: Ensayos a caballo entre varios mundos, 2005, Madrid: Enigma Editores (ISBN 84-609-5844-2)

=== Other books ===
- Flight Risk: Memoirs of a New Orleans Bad Boy, Univ. Press of Mississippi, 2017 (ISBN 978-1-4968-1127-1)
