= The Moviegoer =

1961 novel by Walker Percy

- First edition
- Author: Walker Percy
- Language: English
- Genre: Philosophical fiction
- Publisher: Alfred A. Knopf
- Publication date: May 15, 1961
- Media type: Print (hardcover, paperback)
- Pages: 242

The Moviegoer is the debut novel by Walker Percy, first published in the United States by Alfred A. Knopf in 1961. It won the U.S. National Book Award. Time included the novel in its "Time 100 Best English-language Novels from 1923 to 2005". In 1998, the Modern Library ranked The Moviegoer sixtieth on its list of the hundred best English-language novels of the twentieth century. It is published in the UK by Methuen.

The novel is heavily influenced by the existentialist themes of authors like Søren Kierkegaard, whom Percy read extensively. Unlike many dark didactic existentialist novels (including Percy's later work), The Moviegoer has a light poetic tone. It was Percy's first, most famous, and most widely praised novel, and established him as one of the major voices in Southern literature. The novel also draws on elements of Dante by paralleling the themes of Binx Bolling's life to that of the narrator of the Divine Comedy.

In addition to its existentialist character, the novella is also deeply phenomenological.

== Plot summary ==
The Moviegoer tells the story of Jack "Binx" Bolling, a young stock-broker in postwar New Orleans. The decline of tradition in the Southern United States, the problems of his family and his traumatic experiences in the Korean War have left him alienated from his own life. He day-dreams constantly, has trouble engaging in lasting romantic relationships, and finds more meaning and immediacy in cinema and literature than in his own routine life.

The loose plot of the novel follows the Moviegoer, Binx Bolling, in desperate need of spiritual redemption. At Mardi Gras, he breaks out of his caged every-day life and launches himself on a journey, a quest, in a "search" for God. Without any mental compass or sense of direction, he wanders the streets of New Orleans' French Quarter, and Chicago, and then travels the Gulf Coast, interacting with his surroundings as he goes. He has philosophical moments, reflecting on the people and things he encounters on the road. He is constantly challenged to define himself in relation to friends, family, sweet-hearts, and career despite his urge to remain vague and open to possibility.

"What is the nature of the search?" you ask. Really it is very simple; at least for a fellow like me. So simple that it is easily overlooked. The search is what anyone would undertake if he were not sunk in the everydayness of his own life.

== Characters ==
- John Bickerson "Binx" Bolling, called Jack by his aunt, but Binx by friends, is one week short of his 30th birthday at the start of the book. His older brother Scott died of pneumonia when Binx was eight. He studied biology at Tulane, and was wounded at the Chongchon River in the Korean War, shot in the shoulder, and knocked out for two days.
- Jack Bolling, Binx's father, was a doctor who studied medicine and surgery in Boston, returned to Feliciana Parish to practice medicine under his father. Volunteered for the RCAF in 1940 and was killed in Crete before the US entered World War II.
- Anna Smith (formerly Bolling, née Castagne), Binx's mother, who met Jack when she was assigned to work as his nurse in Feliciana Parish.
- Emily Cutrer (née Bolling), age 65, whom he refers to as his aunt, and main maternal figure, is actually his great-aunt.
- Kate Cutrer, age 25, his aunt's stepdaughter, and therefore his cousin, currently lives with her father and stepmother. When she was 19, in the fall of 1955, she and her fiancé at the time were in a car crash, and he was killed. Getting on a bus the next morning to go home was the happiest moment of her life.
- Sharon Kincaid, Binx' secretary, a young woman from Eufala, AL.
- Uncle Jules Cutrer, Aunt Emily's husband. Was a widower, with his daughter Kate, when Emily married him.
- Walter Wade is Kate's fiancé, age 33, and a senior partner in a law firm specializing in oil lease law. Originally from Clarksburg, West Virginia, he attended Tulane, where he was a college fraternity brother of Binx. He and Binx also attended prep school together in New Hampshire.

== Film version ==
During the 1980s, Terrence Malick worked on a screen adaptation, but eventually dropped it. In December 2005, months after the destruction caused by Hurricane Katrina, Malick explained, "I don’t think the New Orleans of the book exists anymore."

However, Malick's 2015 film Knight of Cups was partly inspired by the novel. Malick had lead actor Christian Bale read the book as preparation for the film.
