= The Last Gentleman (novel) =

1966 novel by Walker Percy

- First edition cover
- Author: Walker Percy
- Language: English
- Publisher: Farrar, Straus and Giroux
- Publication date: 1966
- Publication place: United States
- Media type: Print
- Pages: 352 pp (Paperback edition)

The Last Gentleman is a 1966 novel by Walker Percy. The narrative centers on the character of Williston Bibb Barrett, a man born in the Mississippi Delta who has moved to New York City, where he lives at a YMCA and works as a night janitor. Will has a "nervous condition", which causes him to experience fits of déjà vu and amnesiac fugues.

Early in the story, Will meets the Vaughts, a Southern family temporarily living in New York City so that their son, Jamie, can receive medical treatment there. Mr. Vaught invites Will to return to the South with his family and serve as Jamie's caretaker. The novel focuses on the relationship between Will and the Vaughts, and on Will's continuing search for his own identity.

Walker Percy followed the story of The Last Gentleman in The Second Coming.
