= Walker Percy =

American writer (1916–1990)

Walker Percy OblSB
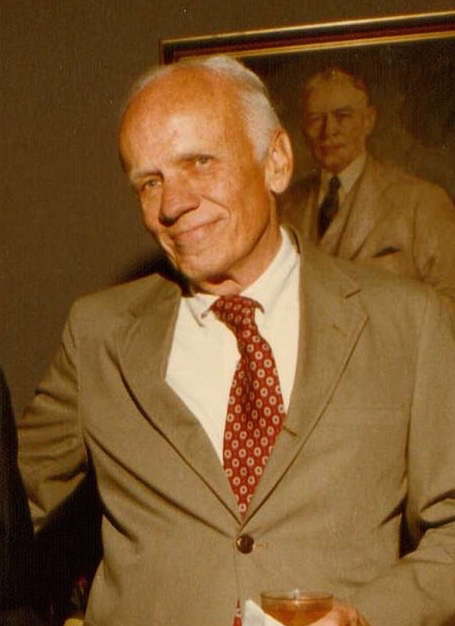
- Percy in 1987
- Born: May 28, 1916; Birmingham, Alabama, U.S.
- Died: May 10, 1990 (aged 73); Covington, Louisiana, U.S.
- Education: University of North Carolina at Chapel Hill (BA); Columbia University (MD)
- Occupation: Writer
- Spouse: Mary Bernice Townsend (m. 1946)
- Children: 2
- Relatives: William Alexander Percy
- Writing career
- Period: 1961–1990
- Genres: Philosophical novelist, memoir, essays
- Notable work: The Moviegoer
- Movement: Southern Gothic

Walker Percy, OblSB (May 28, 1916 – May 10, 1990) was an American writer whose works explored alienation, existentialism, faith, and the limits of science in modern life. A prominent Southern and Catholic literary figure, Percy is especially noted for his novels set in New Orleans. His first, The Moviegoer (1961), won the National Book Award for Fiction.

Both of Percy's parents died in likely suicides, and he was raised by his lawyer and poet cousin William Alexander Percy in Mississippi. Percy studied chemistry at the University of North Carolina at Chapel Hill and received an M.D. from Columbia University in 1941, intending to become a psychiatrist. However, Percy contracted tuberculosis while interning at Bellevue Hospital in 1942 and spent years at sanatoriums like the Trudeau Sanatorium. During his convalescence, Percy read the works of Søren Kierkegaard, Fyodor Dostoevsky, and Jean-Paul Sartre and started to question science's ability to explain human existence. He began attending daily Mass and converted to Catholicism in 1947.

Percy's literary career was launched with a 1956 essay attacking segregation, published in the Catholic magazine Commonweal. His debut novel The Moviegoer was followed by The Last Gentleman (1966), Love in the Ruins (1971), Lancelot (1977), The Second Coming (1980), and The Thanatos Syndrome (1987). He also wrote nonfiction on semiotics and existentialism, including The Message in the Bottle (1975) and Lost in the Cosmos (1983).

Percy spent much of his life in Covington, Louisiana and had a lifelong friendship with author and historian Shelby Foote. Percy also taught at Loyola University New Orleans and was instrumental in the 1980 publication of A Confederacy of Dunces, a decade after the suicide of its author John Kennedy Toole. It won the Pulitzer Prize for Fiction. Walker died of prostate cancer in 1990, shortly after becoming a Benedictine oblate.

== Early life and education ==
Percy was born on May 28, 1916, in Birmingham, Alabama, the first of three boys to LeRoy Pratt Percy and Martha Susan Phinizy. His father's Mississippi Protestant family included his great-uncle LeRoy Percy, a US senator, and LeRoy Pope Walker, a pro-slavery secessionist in Antebellum America and the first Confederate States Secretary of War during the American Civil War. In February 1917, Percy's grandfather died by suicide.

In 1929, when Percy was 13, his father died by suicide. His mother took the family to live at her own mother's home in Athens, Georgia. Two years later, Percy's mother died in a suspected suicide when she drove a car off a country bridge and into Deer Creek near Leland, Mississippi, where they were visiting. Percy regarded this death as another suicide. Walker and his two younger brothers, LeRoy (Roy) and Phinizy (Phin), were taken in by their first cousin once removed, William Alexander Percy, a bachelor lawyer and poet living in Greenville, Mississippi. William Percy introduced him to many writers and poets.

Percy was raised as an agnostic, but he was nominally affiliated with a theologically liberal Presbyterian church. He attended Greenville High School and the University of North Carolina at Chapel Hill, where he majored in chemistry and joined the Xi chapter of Sigma Alpha Epsilon fraternity. He wrote essays and book reviews for the school's Carolina Magazine. He graduated with a B.A. in 1937.

=== Friendship with Shelby Foote ===
After moving to Greenville, Mississippi, in 1930, Shelby Foote became Percy's lifelong best friend. As young men, Percy and Foote decided to visit William Faulkner in Oxford, Mississippi. However, when they arrived at his home, Percy was so in awe of the literary giant that he could not bring himself to speak. Foote and Faulkner had a lively conversation.

External videos
- Interview with Foote on The Correspondence of Shelby Foote and Walker Percy, December 8, 1996, C-SPAN

Percy and Foote were classmates at both Greenville High School and the University of North Carolina at Chapel Hill. Although Foote was not permitted to join Percy's fraternity because of his partly Jewish heritage, he and Percy stayed close friends during their two overlapping years. They went on dates together, made regular trips to nearby Durham, North Carolina, to drink and socialize, and journeyed to New York City during one of their semester breaks. When Percy graduated in 1937, Foote dropped out and returned to Greenville.

In the late 1940s, Percy and Foote began a correspondence that lasted until Percy's death in 1990. A collection of their correspondence was published in 1996.

== Medical training and tuberculosis ==
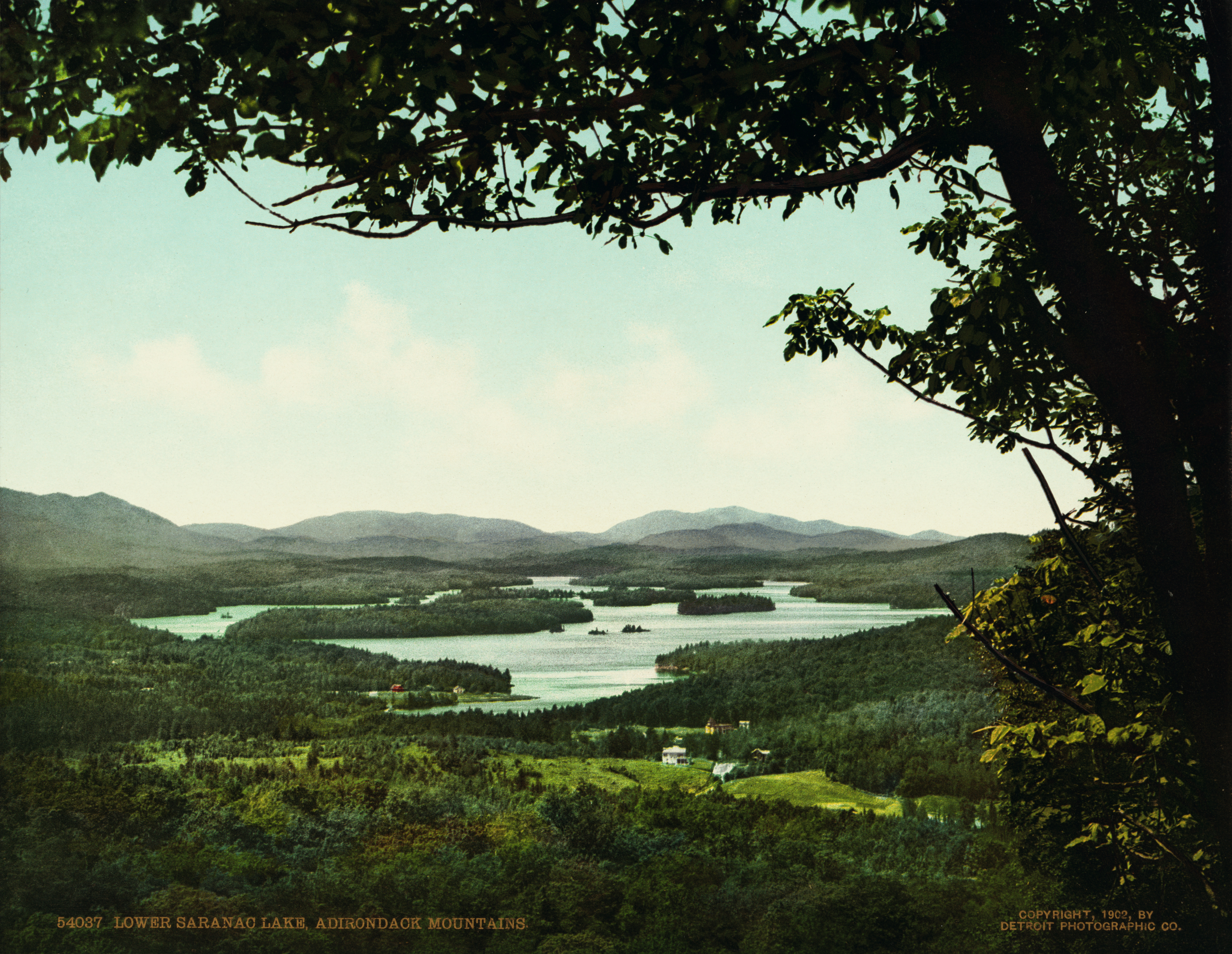
Lower Saranac Lake in the Adirondacks, where Percy spent time recovering from tuberculosis

Percy received an M.D. from Columbia University's College of Physicians and Surgeons in New York City in 1941, intending to become a psychiatrist. There, he spent five days a week in psychoanalysis with Janet Rioch, to whom he had been referred by Harry Stack Sullivan, a friend of Uncle Will. After three years, Walker decided to quit the psychoanalysis and later reflected on his treatment as inconclusive. Percy became an intern at Bellevue Hospital in Manhattan in 1942 but contracted tuberculosis the same year while he was performing an autopsy at Bellevue. At the time, there was no known treatment for the disease other than rest. While he had only a "minimal lesion" that caused him little pain, he was forced to abandon his medical career and to leave the city. Percy spent several years recuperating at the Trudeau Sanitorium in Saranac Lake, in the Adirondack Mountains of Upstate New York. He spent his time sleeping, reading, and listening to his radio to hear updates on World War II. He was envious of his brothers, who were both enlisted in the war and fighting overseas. During this period, Percy used Trudeau's Mellon Library, which held over 7,000 titles. He read the works of Danish existentialist philosopher Søren Kierkegaard as well as Fyodor Dostoevsky, Gabriel Marcel, Jean-Paul Sartre, Franz Kafka, and Thomas Mann. He began to question the ability of science to explain the basic mysteries of human existence. He began to rise daily at dawn to attend Mass.

In August 1944, Percy was pronounced healthy enough to leave Trudeau and was discharged. He traveled to New York City to see Huger Jervey, dean of Columbia Law School and a friend of Percy. He then lived for two months in Atlantic City, New Jersey, with his brother Phin, who was on leave from the Navy. In the spring of 1945, Percy returned to Columbia as an instructor of pathology and took up residence with Huger Jervey. In May, an X-ray revealed a resurgence of the bacillus. Percy consequently traveled to Wallingford, Connecticut, to stay at Gaylord Farm Sanatorium.

Years later, Percy reflected on his illness with more fondness than he had then felt at the time: "I was the happiest man ever to contract tuberculosis, because it enabled me to get out of Bellevue and quit medicine."

== Career ==
=== Early career ===
In 1935, during the winter term of Percy's sophomore year at Chapel Hill, he contributed four pieces to The Carolina Magazine. According to scholars such as Jay Tolson, Percy proved his knowledge and interest in the good and the bad that accompany contemporary culture with his first contributions. Percy's personal experiences at Chapel Hill are portrayed in his first novel, The Moviegoer (1961), through the protagonist Binx Bolling. During the years that Percy spent in his fraternity, Sigma Alpha Epsilon, he "became known for his dry wit," which is how Bolling is described by his fraternity brothers in The Moviegoer.

Percy had begun in 1947 or 1948 to write a novel called The Charterhouse, which was not published and Percy later destroyed. He worked on a second novel, The Gramercy Winner, which also was never published.

Percy's literary career as a Catholic writer began in 1956 with an essay about race in the Catholic magazine Commonweal. The essay "Stoicism in the South" condemned Southern segregation and demanded a larger role for Christian thought in Southern life.

=== Later career ===
After many years of writing and rewriting in collaboration with editor Stanley Kauffmann, Percy published his first novel, The Moviegoer, in 1961. Percy later wrote of the novel that it was the story of "a young man who had all the advantages of a cultivated old-line Southern family: a feel for science and art, a liking for girls, sports cars, and the ordinary things of the culture, but who nevertheless feels himself quite alienated from both worlds, the old South and the new America."

Later works included The Last Gentleman (1966), Love in the Ruins (1971), Lancelot (1977), The Second Coming (1980), and The Thanatos Syndrome in 1987. Percy's personal life and family legends provided inspiration and played a part in his writing. The Thanatos Syndrome features a story about one of Percy's ancestors that was taken from a family chronicle written by Percy's uncle, Will Percy. Percy's vision for the plot of The Second Coming came to him after an old fraternity brother visited him in the 1970s. He told Percy the story of his life where he is burned out and does not know what to do next. The trend of Percy's personal life influencing his writing seemingly held true throughout his literary career, beginning with his first novel. Percy also published a number of nonfiction works exploring his interests in semiotics and existentialism, his most popular work being Lost in the Cosmos.

In 1975, Percy published a collection of essays, The Message in the Bottle: How Queer Man Is, How Queer Language Is, and What One Has to Do with the Other. Percy attempted to forge a connection between the idea of Judeo-Christian ethics and rationalized science and behavioralism. According to scholars such as Anne Berthoff and Linda Whitney Hobson, Percy presented a new way of viewing the struggles of the common man by his specific use of anecdotes and language.

Percy taught and mentored younger writers. While teaching at Loyola University of New Orleans, he was instrumental in getting John Kennedy Toole's novel A Confederacy of Dunces published in 1980. That was more than a decade after Toole committed suicide, despondent about being unable to get recognition for his book. Set in New Orleans, it won the Pulitzer Prize for Fiction, which was posthumously awarded to Toole.

In 1987, Percy, along with 21 other noted authors, met in Chattanooga, Tennessee, to create the Fellowship of Southern Writers.

== Personal life ==
Percy married Mary Bernice Townsend, a medical technician, on November 7, 1946. Both studied Catholicism and were received into the Roman Catholic Church in 1947. Fearing that Percy was sterile, the married couple adopted a first daughter, Mary Pratt, but later conceived a second daughter, Ann, who became deaf at an early age. The family settled in Covington, Louisiana, across Lake Pontchartrain from New Orleans. Percy's wife and one of their daughters later had a bookstore, where the writer often worked in an office on the second floor.

=== Views ===
Percy was strongly anti-abortion. In 1981, he authored a New York Times opinion article, in which he called abortion a "banal atrocity".

Percy's final novel, The Thanatos Syndrome, condemns eugenics, senicide, and abortion. Percy was a member of the anti-communist organization the Information Council of the Americas (INCA).

== Illness and death ==
Percy underwent an operation for prostate cancer on March 10, 1988, but it had already metastasized to surrounding tissue and lymph nodes. In July 1989, he volunteered to allow his doctors at the Mayo Clinic, in Rochester, Minnesota, to use experimental medicines. Percy enrolled in a pilot study to test the effects of the drugs interferon and fluorouracil in cancer patients. In his correspondence with Foote, Percy expressed frustration over the frequent travel and hospital stays: "Hospitals are no place for anyone, let alone a sick man." Although the side effects of the experimental treatment were debilitating, Percy had a revelation when he saw children with cancer waiting in the lounges. He decided to continue the treatment at Mayo as long as he could so that the results of his treatment might be of value to others.

He died of prostate cancer at his home in Covington in 1990, eighteen days before his 74th birthday. He is buried on the grounds of St. Joseph Benedictine Abbey, in St. Benedict, Louisiana. He had become a secular oblate of the Abbey's monastic community, making his final oblation on February 16, 1990, less than three months before his death.

== Legacy and honors ==
=== Influence ===
Percy's work, which often features protagonists facing displacement, influenced other Southern authors. According to scholar Farrell O'Gorman, Percy's vision helped bring a fundamental change in southern literature where authors began to use characters concerned with "a sense of estrangement". His writing serves as an example for contemporary southern writers who attempt to combine elements of history, religion, science, and the modern world. Scholars such as Jay Tolson state that Percy's frequent use of characters facing spiritual loneliness in the modern world helped introduce different ways of writing in the south post-war.

=== Awards and honors ===
In 1962, Percy was awarded the National Book Award for Fiction for his first novel, The Moviegoer.

In 1985, Percy was awarded the St. Louis Literary Award from the Saint Louis University Library Associates.

In 1989, the University of Notre Dame awarded Percy its Laetare Medal, which is bestowed annually to a Catholic "whose genius has ennobled the arts and sciences, illustrated the ideals of the Church, and enriched the heritage of humanity".

Also in 1989, the National Endowment for the Humanities chose him as the winner for the Jefferson Lecture in the Humanities. He read his essay, "The Fateful Rift: The San Andreas Fault in the Modern Mind".

Loyola University New Orleans has multiple archival and manuscript collections related to Percy's life and work.

In 2019, a Mississippi Writers Trail historical marker was installed in Greenville, Mississippi, to honor Percy's literary contributions.

== Works ==
=== Novels ===
- The Moviegoer. New York: Knopf, 1961; reprinted Avon, 1980 — winner of the National Book Award
- The Last Gentleman. New York: Farrar, Straus, 1966; reprinted Avon, 1978.
- Love in the Ruins: The Adventures of a Bad Catholic at a Time Near the End of the World. New York: Farrar, Straus, 1971; reprinted Avon, 1978.
- Lancelot. New York: Farrar, Straus, 1977.
- The Second Coming. New York: Farrar, Straus, 1980.
- The Thanatos Syndrome. New York: Farrar, Straus, 1987.

=== Nonfiction ===
Several of the following texts are mere pamphlets, reprinted in Signposts in a Strange Land (ed. Samway).

- The Message in the Bottle: How Queer Man Is, How Queer Language Is, and What One Has to Do with the Other. New York: Farrar, Straus, 1975.
- Going Back to Georgia. Athens: University of Georgia, 1978 (also in Signposts, 1991.)
- Questions They Never Asked Me. Northridge, California: Lord John Press, 1979 (also in Signposts, 1991.)
- Bourbon. Winston-Salem, North Carolina: Palaemon Press, 1982 (also in Signposts, 1991.)
- Lost in the Cosmos: The Last Self-Help Book. New York: Farrar, Straus, 1983.
- How to Be an American Novelist in Spite of Being Southern and Catholic. Lafayette: University of Southwestern Louisiana, 1984 (also in Signposts, 1991.)
- The City of the Dead. Northridge, California: Lord John Press, 1985 (also in Signposts, 1991.)
- Conversations with Walker Percy. Lawson, Lewis A., and Victor A. Kramer, eds. Jackson: University Press of Mississippi, 1985.
- Diagnosing the Modern Malaise. New Orleans: Faust, 1985. (Also in Signposts, 1991.)
- Novel-Writing in an Apocalyptic Time. New Orleans: Faust Publishing Company, 1986. (Also in Signposts, 1991.)
- State of the Novel: Dying Art or New Science. New Orleans: Faust Publishing Company, 1988. (Also in Signposts, 1991.)
- Signposts in a Strange Land. Samway, Patrick, ed. New York: Farrar, Straus, 1991.
- More Conversations with Walker Percy. Lawson, Lewis A., and Victor A. Kramer, eds. Jackson: University Press of Mississippi, 1993.
- A Thief of Peirce: The Letters of Kenneth Laine Ketner and Walker Percy. Samway, Patrick, ed. Jackson: University Press of Mississippi, 1995.
- The Correspondence of Shelby Foote and Walker Percy. Tolson, Jay, ed. New York: Center for Documentary Studies, 1996.
- Symbol and Existence: A Study in Meaning: Explorations of Human Nature by Walker Percy. Edited by Ketner, Kenneth Laine, Karey Lea Perkins, Rhonda Reneé McDonell, Scott Ross Cunningham. Macon, GA: Mercer University Press, 2019. Percy's previously unpublished book on his working theory.

== See also ==
- William Alexander Percy
