= The Pleasure of the Text =

1973 book by Roland Barthes

- Cover of the first edition
- Author: Roland Barthes
- Original title: Le Plaisir du Texte
- Language: French
- Subject: Literary theory
- Publisher: Éditions du Seuil
- Publication date: 1973
- Publication place: France
- Media type: Print
- Pages: 105
- ISBN: 2-02-006060-4
- OCLC: 10314663

The Pleasure of the Text (French: Le Plaisir du Texte) is a 1973 book by the French literary theorist Roland Barthes.

== Summary ==
Barthes sets out some of his ideas about literary theory. He divides the effects of texts into two: plaisir ('pleasure') and jouissance, translated as 'bliss' (but the French word also carries the meaning of 'orgasm').

The distinction corresponds to a further distinction Barthes makes between texte lisible and texte scriptible, translated respectively as 'readerly' and 'writerly' texts (a more literal translation would be 'readable' and 'writable'). Scriptible is a neologism in French. The pleasure of the text corresponds to the readerly text, which does not challenge the reader's position as a subject. The writerly text provides bliss, which explodes literary codes and allows the reader to break out of his or her subject position.

The "readerly" and the "writerly" texts were identified and explained in Barthes's S/Z. Barthes argues that "writerly" texts are more important than "readerly" ones because he sees the text's unity as forever being re-established by its composition, the codes that form and constantly slide around within the text. The reader of a readerly text is largely passive, whereas the person who engages with a writerly text has to make an active effort, and even to re-enact the actions of the writer himself. The different codes (hermeneutic, action, symbolic, semic, and historical) that Barthes defines in S/Z inform and reinforce one another, making for an open text that is indeterminant precisely because it can always be written anew.

As a consequence, although one may experience pleasure in the readerly text, it is when one sees the text from the writerly point of view that the experience is blissful.

== Influences ==
Few writers in cultural studies and the social sciences have used and developed the distinctions that Barthes makes. The British sociologist of education Stephen Ball has argued that the National Curriculum in England and Wales is a writerly text, by which he means that schools, teachers and pupils have a certain amount of scope to reinterpret and develop it. On the other hand, artist Roy Ascott's pioneering telematic artwork, La Plissure du Texte ('The Pleating of the Texte', 1983) drew inspiration from Barthes's Le Plaisir du Texte. Ascott modified the title to emphasize the pleasure of collective textual pleating. In Ascott's artwork, the pleating of the text resulted from a process that the artist calls "distributed authorship", which expands Barthes' concept of the "readerly text". In Ascott's work, the text itself is the result of a collaborative reading/writing process among participants around the world, connected via computer networking (telematics). Ascott's work thus unravels the distinction between readers and writers, demonstrating a much greater degree of permeability than Barthes's distinction permits (and beyond Barthes's theory of the death of the author). Moreover, the mechanism of distributed authorship enabled Ascott's "planetary fairytale" to self-pleat in a way that, like a surrealist exquisite corpse, could not have been the product of a single mind. Rather, Ascott suggests, the work emerged as the result of an emergent field of collective intelligence that joined minds together in a global field of consciousness.
