= Ihab Hassan =

American literary theorist

- Born: October 17, 1925; Cairo, Kingdom of Egypt
- Died: September 10, 2015 (aged 89); Milwaukee, Wisconsin, U.S.

Ihab Habib Hassan (Arabic: إيهاب حبيب حسن; October 17, 1925 – September 10, 2015) was an Egyptian-American literary theorist and writer. He was known for popularizing the concept of postmodernism in literary studies with his influential 1971 book, The Dismemberment of Orpheus: Toward a Postmodern Literature.

== Biography ==
Ihab Hassan was born in Cairo, Egypt, and emigrated to the United States in 1946. He was Emeritus Vilas Research Professor at the University of Wisconsin–Milwaukee. His writings include influential books such as The Dismemberment of Orpheus: Toward a Postmodern Literature (1971, 1982), Paracriticisms: Seven Speculations of the Times (1975), and The Postmodern Turn: Essays in Postmodern Theory and Culture (1987). In his later years, he published a number of short stories in various literary magazines. Before his death he completed The Changeling and Other Stories. He also wrote more than 300 essays and reviews on literary and cultural subjects, and delivered over 500 public lectures in North America, Europe, Asia, Africa, Australia, and New Zealand.

== Modernism and postmodernism ==
In The Dismemberment of Orpheus, Hassan set out the differences between modernism and postmodernism.

Modernism	Postmodernism
Romanticism/Symbolism	Pataphysics/Dadaism
Form (conjunctive, closed)	Antiform (disjunctive, open)
Purpose	Play
Design	Chance
Hierarchy	Anarchy
Mastery/Logos	Exhaustion/Silence
Art Object / Finished Work	Process/Performance/Happening
Distance	Participation
Creation/Totalization	Decreation/Deconstruction
Synthesis	Antithesis
Presence	Absence
Centering	Dispersal
Genre/Boundary	Text/Intertext
Semantics	Rhetoric
Paradigm	Syntagm
Hypotaxis	Parataxis
Metaphor	Metonymy
Selection	Combination
Root/Depth	Rhizome/Surface
Interpretation/Reading	Against Interpretation / Misreading
Signified	Signifier
Lisible (Readerly)	Scriptible (Writerly)
Narrative / Grande Histoire	Anti-narrative / Petite Histoire
Master Code	Idiolect
Symptom	Desire
Type	Mutant
Genital/Phallic	Polymorphous/Androgynous
Paranoia	Schizophrenia
Origin / Cause	Difference-Differance / Trace
God the Father	The Holy Ghost
Metaphysics	Irony
Determinacy	Indeterminacy
Transcendence	Immanence

Hassan's "Table of Differences between Modernism and Postmodernism" ends with the statement: "Yet the dichotomies this table represents remain insecure, equivocal. For differences shift, defer, even collapse; concepts in any one vertical column are not all equivalent; and inversions and exceptions, in both modernism and postmodernism, abound."

== Works ==
Hassan's written works include:

- Radical Innocence: Studies in the Contemporary American Novel (1961)
- The Literature of Silence: Henry Miller and Samuel Beckett (1967)
- The Dismemberment of Orpheus: Toward a Postmodern Literature (1971, 1982)
- Paracriticisms: Seven Speculations of the Times (1975)
- The Right Promethean Fire: Imagination, Science, and Cultural Change (1980)
- Out of Egypt: Scenes and Arguments of an Autobiography (1985)
- The Postmodern Turn: Essays in Postmodern Theory and Culture (1987)
- Selves at Risk: Patterns of Quest in Contemporary American Letters (1990)
- Rumors of Change: Essays of Five Decades (1995)
- Between the Eagle and the Sun: Traces of Japan (1996)
- In Quest of Nothing: Selected Essays, 1998-2008 (2010)

== Academic achievements ==
- Guggenheim Fellowship (1958, 1962)
- Faculty of the School of Letters, Indiana University (1964)
- Faculty of the Salzburg Summer Seminars in American Studies (1965,1975)
- Senior Fulbright Lectureships (1966, 1974, 1975)
- Visiting Fellow at the Woodrow Wilson International Center for Scholars (1972)
- Senior Fellow at the Camargo Foundation in Cassis, France (1974–1975)
- Resident Scholar at the Rockefeller Study Center in Bellagio (1978)
- Senior Fellow at the Humanities Research Center in Canberra (1990, 2003)
- Resident Fellow at the Humanities Research Institute of the University of California, Irvine (1990)
- Faculty of the Stuttgart Summer Seminars in Cultural Studies (1991)
- Honorary degree: Faculty of Humanities at Uppsala University, Sweden (1996)
- Honorary degree: University of Giessen (1999)
- Faculty of the Scandinavian Summer School of Literary Theory and Criticism in Karlskrona (2000, 2001, 2004).

Hassan also received Alumni Teaching Award and the Honors Program Teaching Award at the University of Wisconsin in Milwaukee, where he taught for 29 years.
