= Regarding the Pain of Others =

2003 book-length essay by Susan Sontag

- Cover depicting plate 36 ("Tampoco") from Goya's series The Disasters of War, 1810–20
- Author: Susan Sontag
- Cover artist: Francisco Goya
- Language: English
- Publisher: Farrar, Straus and Giroux
- Publication date: 2003
- Publication place: United States
- Media type: book
- Pages: 131
- ISBN: 978-0-374-24858-1
- OCLC: 51446024

Regarding the Pain of Others is a 2003 book-length essay by American writer Susan Sontag, which was nominated for the National Book Critics Circle Award. It was her last published book before her death in 2004. Sontag regarded the book as a sequel to her 1977 essay collection On Photography and reassessed some of the views she held in the latter. The essay is especially interested in war photography.

The book discusses how images of war and suffering shape our perception of reality. Sontag argues that photographs often distort or aestheticise violence, turning real suffering into something distant, consumable, or even voyeuristic. Rather than deepening understanding, repeated exposure to such images can dull emotional response and encourage a detached, spectator-like attitude. In contrast, Sontag suggests that words, not images, may better foster reflection and empathy.

== Previous publications ==
On December 9, 2002, The New Yorker had published Sontag's article "Looking at War. Photography's View of Devastation and Death", where she discussed similar views as those later expanded in her book Regarding the Pain of Others. In contrast with the book, this article included Robert Capa's photograph of the Falling Soldier from the Spanish Civil War. Further, she had presented parts of these views in an Amnesty Lecture at Oxford University in February 2001 that were later published in the collection Human Rights, Human Wrongs.

== Contents ==
Regarding the Pain of Others explores the ethical and emotional complexities of viewing photographs depicting suffering. Like her previous book On Photography, this work contains no images, reflecting her skepticism about photography’s ability to truthfully represent reality. Sontag critiques how media and society consume images of pain—often desensitized, treating horrors as distant spectacles rather than urgent human tragedies.

While challenging a certain number of common ideas concerning images of pain, horror, and atrocity, Regarding the Pain of Others both underscores their importance and undercuts hopes that they can communicate very much. On the one hand, narrative and framing confer upon images most of their meaning, and on the other, Sontag says, those who have not lived through such things "can't understand, can't imagine" the experiences such images represent.

Using photography as evidence for her opinions, Sontag sets out to answer a question first posed in Virginia Woolf's 1938 book Three Guineas, "How in your opinion are we to prevent war?" While Woolf had reflected on the causes of war, the role of gender and society, and the importance of maintaining a sense of shared humanity in the face of conflict, Sontag shifts the focus to the role of photography and visual representation in shaping the public perception of war. Echoing Woolf's use of the word we, Sontag asserts her conviction that the effect of photographs of war and suffering is shaped by the viewer’s intellectual and emotional reaction, as she stated: "No "we" should be taken for granted when the subject is looking at other people's pain."

Sontag discusses both historical and contemporary examples where photographs were staged or manipulated, such as Roger Fenton’s sanitized Crimean War images or the iconic, but partially staged and edited Red Flag over the Reichstag. Further, she recalls well-known documentary images of human suffering, including those of emaciated inmates in Buchenwald concentration camp, the Spanish Civil war, the Vietnam War, the September 11 attacks of the World Trade Center or dead bodies in Jenin refugee camp.

Sontag argues that such images, while powerful, risk becoming mere aesthetic objects, stripped of their moral weight when shown in galleries or magazines. Rather, she proposes that such powerful images should be experienced privately, not as part of a casual gallery visit. Ultimately, she places greater trust in language than in images, suggesting that words can provide context and encourage reflection in ways pictures alone cannot.

The cover of the U.S. edition depicts a detail of the engraving no. 36 ("Tampoco") from Francisco Goya's series The Disasters of War, (1810–20).

== Reception ==
Regarding the Pain of Others was nominated for the National Book Critics Circle Award. The essay received both wide appreciation as well as criticism in public media and academic scholarship. It was translated into several languages, including French, German, Spanish, Korean, Chinese and Armenian.

In his review for The Guardian, Peter Conrad portrayed the book as a serious but limited meditation on how modern media turns distant suffering into something we observe rather than truly comprehend. On a critical note, the reviewer is sceptical of some of Sontag’s claims. He doubts that images are as easily turned into political symbols as she suggests and finds her argument repetitive and insufficiently supported by examples, especially since the book itself contains no photographs. He mentions, however, the sole photograph on the inside back flap of the U.S. edition – a flattering portrait of Sontag herself taken by Annie Leibovitz – as a contradiction between her arguments and her own vanity. The reviewer concludes by critiquing the book’s brevity.

A commentary in the Kirkus Reviews appreciated some of Sontag's statements such as “All memory is individual, unreproducible – it dies with each person.” “To remember is, more and more, not to recall a story but to be able to call up a picture.” and “Narratives can make us understand. Photographs do something else: they haunt us.” In general, however, it called Sontag's discussion "only imperfectly satisfying" and summarized the essay as "Moments of brilliance and wonder amid the generally disappointing."

John Leonard's review in The New York Times offered both appreciation and criticism of Sontag’s essay. Leonard praised Sontag’s intellectual rigor and her "usual archaeology" in tracing the history of war photography from Roger Fenton to the atrocities of the Khmer Rouge. He highlighted her ability to provoke thought about the ethical and moral dimensions of viewing such suffering and her call to move beyond passive consumption of images to active questioning of their causes and responsibilities. On the critical side, Leonard implied that Sontag’s tone can be combative and her arguments sometimes sweeping, as she "loses her temper" and dismissed certain theoretical perspectives, like those of Guy Debord and Jean Baudrillard, as "merely impudent" in the face of real suffering.

== Editions ==
- New York: Farrar, Straus and Giroux, 2003. ISBN 978-0-374-22626-8.
- London: Penguin, 2019 . ISBN 978-0-14-101237-7

== See also ==
- Camera Lucida
- Photography and Non-Logical Form
