= Semiotic literary criticism =

Semiotic literary criticism, also called literary semiotics, is the approach to literary criticism informed by the theory of signs or semiotics. Semiotics, tied closely to the structuralism pioneered by Ferdinand de Saussure, was extremely influential in the development of literary theory out of the formalist approaches of the early twentieth century.

== History ==
The early forms of literary semiotics grew out of formalist approaches to literature, especially Russian formalism, and structuralist linguistics, especially the Prague school. Notable early semiotic authors included Vladimir Propp, Algirdas Julius Greimas, and Viktor Shklovsky. These critics were concerned with formal analysis of narrative forms which would resemble a literary mathematics, or at least a literary syntax, as far as possible. They proposed various formal notations for narrative components and transformations and attempted a descriptive taxonomy of existing stories along these lines.

Propp's Morphology of the Folktale (orig. Russian pub. 1928; English trans. 1958) provides an example of the formal and systematic approach. In successive chapters, Propp analyzes the characters, plot events, and other elements of traditional folktales (primarily from Russia and Eastern Europe). For each of these key components he provides a letter designation (with superscripts to designate specific subtypes). He proceeds to analyze individual tales by transposing them into this notation and then to generalize about their structure. For example:

Analysis of a simple, single-move tale of class H-I, of the type: kidnapping of a person.

131. A tsar, three daughters (α). The daughters go walking (β³), overstay in the garden (δ¹). A dragon kidnaps them (A¹). A call for aid (B¹). Quest of three heroes (C↑). Three battles with the dragon (H¹–I¹), rescue of the maidens (K^{4}). Return (↓), reward (w°). (Propp 128)

He then gives the complete structure of this story in one line of notation, the analysis complete and ready to be compared systematically with other tales:

αβ³δ¹A¹B¹C↑H¹–I¹K^{4}↓w°

Later semiotic approaches to literature have often been less systematic (or, in some special cases such as Roland Barthes's S/Z, they have been so specifically and exhaustively systematic as to render the possibility of a complete literary semiotics doubtful). As structuralist linguistics gave way to a post-structuralist philosophy of language which denied the scientific ambitions of the general theory of signs, semiotic literary criticism became more playful and less systematic in its ambitions. Still, some authors harbor more scientific ambition for their literary schemata than others. Later authors in the semiotic tradition of literary criticism include Tzvetan Todorov, Mikhail Bakhtin, Roland Barthes, Juri Lotman, Julia Kristeva, Michael Riffaterre, and Umberto Eco.

== See also ==
- Structuralist literary criticism
