= The Death of the Author =

1967 essay by Roland Barthes

"The Death of the Author" (French: La mort de l'auteur) is a 1967 essay by the French literary critic and theorist Roland Barthes (1915–1980), which spawned the homonymous literary theory. Barthes argues against traditional literary criticism's practice of relying on the intentions and biography of an author to definitively explain the "ultimate meaning" of a text. Instead, the essay emphasizes the primacy of each individual reader's interpretation of the work over any "definitive" meaning intended by the author, a process in which subtle or unnoticed characteristics may be drawn out for new insight. The essay's first English-language publication was in the American journal Aspen, no. 5–6 in 1967; the French debut was in the magazine Manteia, no. 5 (1968). The essay later appeared in an anthology of Barthes' essays, Image-Music-Text (1977), a book that also included his "From Work to Text".

== Content ==
In his essay, Barthes argues against the method of reading and criticism that relies on aspects of an author's identity to distill meaning from the author's work. In this type of criticism against which he argues, the experiences and biases of the author serve as a definitive "explanation" of the text. For Barthes, however, this method of reading may be apparently tidy and convenient but is actually sloppy and flawed: "To give a text an author" and assign a single, corresponding interpretation to it, "is to impose a limit on that text".

Thus, readers must, according to Barthes, separate a literary work from its creator in order to liberate the text from interpretive tyranny (a notion similar to Erich Auerbach's discussion of narrative tyranny in biblical parables). Each piece of writing contains multiple layers and meanings. In a well-known passage, Barthes draws an analogy between text and textiles, declaring that a "text is a tissue [or fabric] of quotations", drawn from "innumerable centers of culture", rather than from one, individual experience. The essential meaning of a work depends on the impressions of the reader, rather than the "passions" or "tastes" of the writer; "a text's unity lies not in its origins", or its creator, "but in its destination", or its audience.

No longer the focus of creative influence, the author is merely a "scriptor" (a word Barthes uses expressively to disrupt the traditional continuity of power between the terms "author" and "authority"). The scriptor exists to produce but not to explain the work and "is born simultaneously with the text, is in no way equipped with a being preceding or exceeding the writing, [and] is not the subject with the book as predicate." Every work is "eternally written here and now", with each re-reading, because the "origin" of meaning lies exclusively in "language itself" and its impressions on the reader.

Barthes notes that the traditional critical approach to literature raises a thorny problem: how can we detect precisely what the writer intended? His answer is that we cannot. He introduces this notion of intention in the epigraph to the essay, taken from Honoré de Balzac's story Sarrasine in which a male protagonist mistakes a castrato for a woman and falls in love with him. When, in the passage, the character dotes over his perceived womanliness, Barthes challenges his own readers to determine who is speaking, and about what. "Is it Balzac the author professing 'literary' ideas on femininity? Is it universal wisdom? Romantic psychology? ... We can never know." Writing, "the destruction of every voice", defies adherence to a single interpretation or perspective. (Barthes returned to Sarrasine in his book S/Z, where he gave the story a rigorous close reading.)

Acknowledging the presence of this idea (or variations of it) in the works of previous writers, Barthes cited in his essay the poet Stéphane Mallarmé, who said that "it is language that speaks." He also recognized Marcel Proust as being "concerned with the task of inexorably blurring ... the relation between the writer and his characters"; the Surrealist movement for employing the practice of "automatic writing" to express "what the head itself is unaware of"; and the field of linguistics as a discipline for "showing that the whole of enunciation is an empty process." Barthes' articulation of the death of the author is a radical and drastic recognition of this severing of authority and authorship. Instead of discovering a "single 'theological' meaning (the 'message' of the Author-God)", readers of a text discover that writing, in reality, constitutes "a multi-dimensional space", which cannot be "deciphered", only "disentangled".

"Refusing to assign a 'secret', an ultimate meaning" to text "liberates what may be called an anti-theological activity, an activity that is truly revolutionary since to refuse meaning is, in the end, to refuse God and his hypostases—reason, science, law."

== Influences and overview ==
Ideas presented in "The Death of the Author" were anticipated to some extent by New Criticism, a school of literary criticism important in the United States from the 1940s to the 1970s. New Criticism differs from Barthes' theory of critical reading because it attempts to arrive at more authoritative interpretations of texts. Nevertheless, the crucial New Critical precept of the "intentional fallacy" declares that a poem does not belong to its author; rather, "it is detached from the author at birth and goes about the world beyond his power to intend about it or control it. The poem belongs to the public." Barthes himself stated that the difference between his theory and New Criticism comes in the practice of "disentangling". Barthes' work has much in common with the ideas of the "Yale school" of deconstructionist critics, which numbered among its proponents Paul de Man and Barbara Johnson in the 1970s, although they are not inclined to see meaning as the production of the reader. Barthes, like the deconstructionists, insists upon the disjointed nature of texts, their fissures of meaning and their incongruities, interruptions, and breaks. A. D. Nuttall's essay "Did Meursault Mean to Kill the Arab? The Intentional Fallacy Fallacy" (Critical Quarterly 10:1–2, June 1968, pp. 95–106) exposes the logical flaws in the "Intentional fallacy" argument.

Michel Foucault also addressed the question of the author in critical interpretation. In his 1969 essay "What is an Author?", he developed the idea of "author function" to explain the author as a classifying principle within a particular discursive formation. Foucault did not mention Barthes in his essay but its analysis has been seen as a challenge to Barthes' depiction of a historical progression that will liberate the reader from domination by the author.

Jacques Derrida paid ironic homage to Barthes' "The Death of the Author" in his essay "The Deaths of Roland Barthes".

Literary theorist Seán Burke dedicated an entire book to opposing "The Death of the Author", pointedly called The Death and Return of the Author.

In the satirical essay "Roland Barthes' Resurrection of the Author and Redemption of Biography" (Cambridge Quarterly 29:4, 2000, pp. 386–393), J.C. Carlier (a pseudonym of Cedric Watts, Research Professor of English at the University of Sussex) argues that the essay "The Death of the Author" is the litmus test of critical competence. Those who take it literally automatically fail that test; those who take it ironically and recognize a work of fine satiric fiction are those who pass the test.

Scholarship on pedagogy has also taken up several themes from "Death of the Author" and applied them to different domains of academic and instructional research. While specific projects vary, concerns across research construct theoretical frameworks that rely on Barthes' notion of emphasizing the reader's impressions in textual practices. However, viewed through a pedagogical lens, researchers regard encounters between students and texts as dialogic, empowering transactions that should draw on the student's knowledge to take on language's multiplicity. Along these lines, scholarship has explored broad and varied topics within pedagogy, such as information literacy instruction, critical thinking skills and literary interpretation, academic subjectivity, and writing pedagogies. For example, a model of information literacy instruction for librarians extends Barthes' idea of deemphasizing author-centered ways of understanding texts by promoting dialogues between librarians and students. The goal of this model is for the librarian to listen to the student's values and beliefs and move from being a "fact provider" and adopt a "learner-centered" approach. Additional research on developing critical thinking skills in interpreting literary texts extends this idea of shifting responsibility of learning onto the learner. Specific to the classroom environment, this research considers how literature can be used as a conceptual link for students to bridge the classroom content to the outside world. In a Barthesian tradition, its pedagogical aim stresses the student's subjectivity by scaffolding literary questions that start at the surface but eventually rise to an interpretive level encouraging students to express their own views. Importantly, personal response is emphasized in this model over "right or wrong" answers.

Other research has drawn on "The Death of the Author" only to subvert its original ideas of disrupting the singularity of author-centered literary criticism and interpretation by suggesting collaborative methods of authorship that enable plural pathways of knowledge. For example, in a recent attempt to challenge the "individualist author model of scholarship in the humanities", scholars experimented with forms of peer production and publishing by pursuing an authorial collaboration of writing among scholars. Although the model articulates an authorial stance, it advances Barthes' ideas of encouraging multiple perspectives, interpretations, and ideological positions through the use of language by rendering authorship a pursuit of collective intelligence that calls into question traditional norms of scholarship. Additional studies further this notion with nuanced attention to collective authorship. The first explores having a group of youth with disabilities convey their life-narratives through fictional stories, while the second looks at teacher candidates writing autobiographies with specific attention to their values about teaching. Both take up the idea of a text's potential for dialogic engagement with its constructor of meaning, and how that dialogic process is essential for self-reflexivity and empowerment in the literacy process.

== Analysis ==
=== Applications for critical pedagogy ===
Themes from Roland Barthes' essay have also been applied to research on critical pedagogy. Previous research projects have emphasized foregrounding students' knowledge in literacy practices, and in this way stress Barthes' central idea of relying on the reader's impressions for literary study. These studies advocate learning for students that is dialogic in nature, claiming that students should arrive at their own knowledge by exploring and questioning a text's multiple meanings. While the theoretical frameworks, methods, research designs, and audiences of particular studies vary, the central idea across projects, commonly seen in constructivist methods of pedagogy, is to increase a sense of student ownership and autonomy by having them consider multiple forms of knowledge against their own beliefs and values. For example, in one study, a model of information literacy instruction encourages a conversational approach to recommending and locating texts between librarians and students, rather than only suggesting texts by genre or author names. These projects extend one of Barthes' underlying points in his essay in which he emphasizes trusting subjective knowledge over depending on traditional and authoritative bodies of knowledge.

Other research has subverted Barthes' original thesis of disrupting author-centered literary criticism by suggesting collaborative methods of authorship. These studies describe writing models in which multiple authors "co-construct" stories and articles together, inviting writers to contribute their own ideas and knowledge and create a product that resembles an assemblage of voices and perspectives. Although the premise of these models advance the author's position, the collective, peer-based process of how these texts are constructed challenge traditional authority of singular authorship. These studies extend Barthes' initial ideas of how a text contains multiple ideological positions and interpretive possibilities, as well as disputing authorial influence and force, by offering a democratic and pluralistic framework for authorship.

=== Wikipedia ===
The online encyclopedia Wikipedia, with its open collaborative nature, has been described as realizing the death of the author, by blurring the line between readership and authorship.

== See also ==
- Art for art
- Authorial intent
- Lisible
- Not in Heaven
- Postmodernism
- Reader-response criticism

== Sources ==
- Barthes, Roland. Susan Sontag, ed. A Barthes Reader. New York: Hill and Wang, 1982.
