= Impasse des Bourdonnais =

Street in the 1st arrondissement of Paris

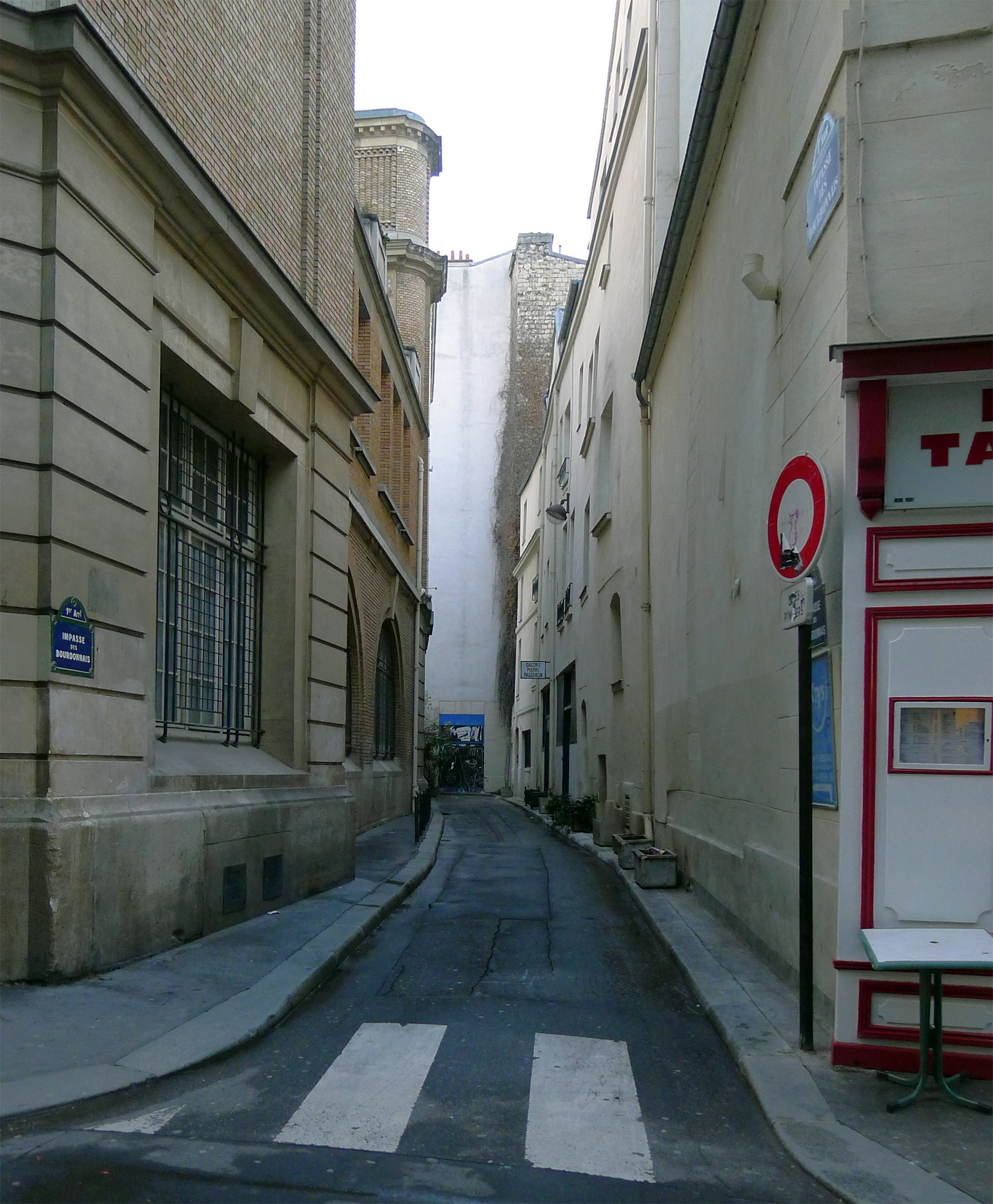
The street in 2012.

Impasse des Bourdonnais is a street in the 1st arrondissement of Paris.

== History ==
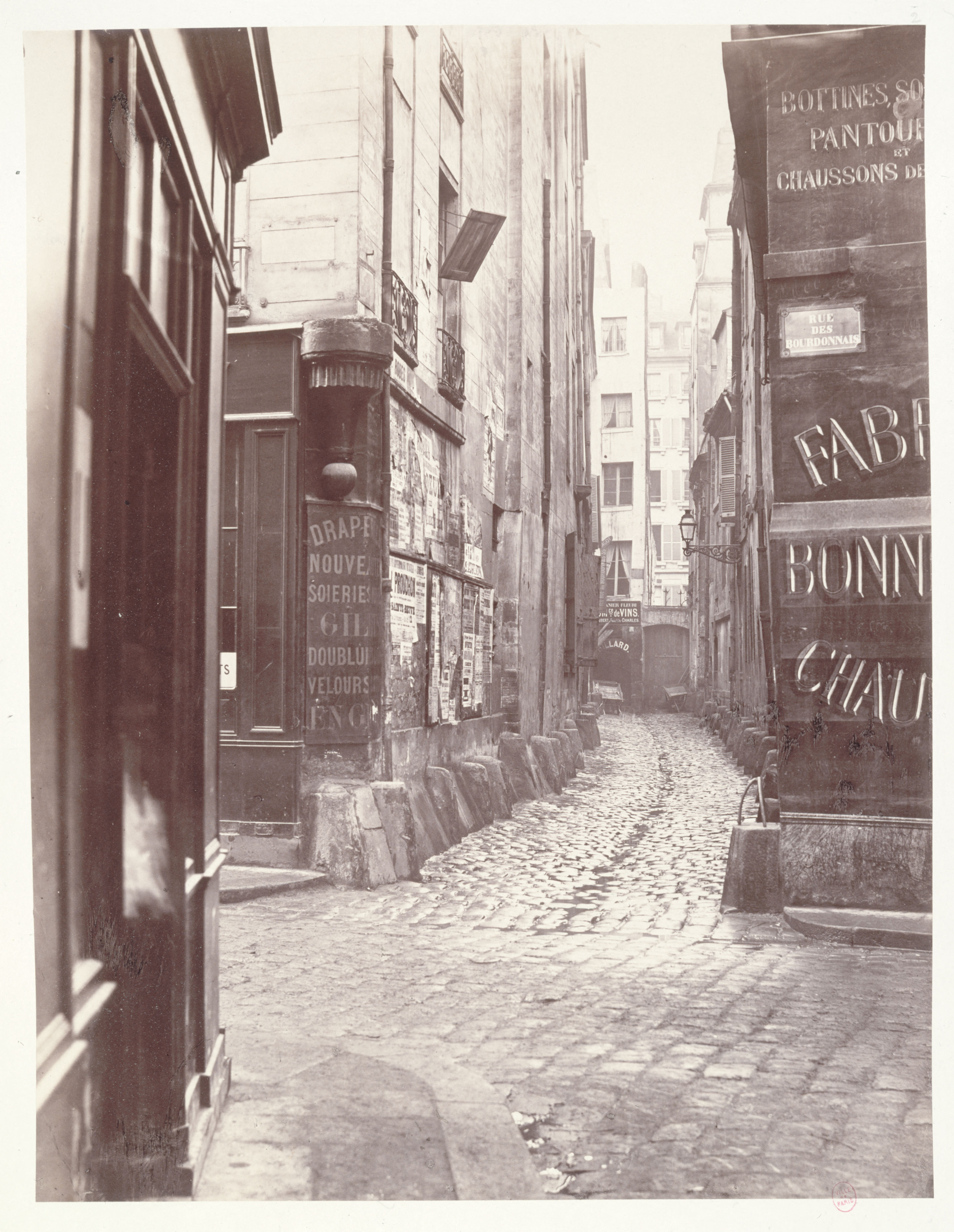
The street photographed by Charles Marville (1816-1879).

Like the rue des Bourdonnais, the street owes its name to Adam and Guillaume Bourdon, civic administrators in the 12th century.

In the Middle Ages, the street served as a deposit for refuse, corpses and other filth from the surrounding area. There was a pig market there until around 1360. The place had a sinister reputation at the time. Two witches were burned alive there in 1319; the place also saw the execution by boiling of counterfeiters.

The school located at the street's intersection with the rue des Bourdonnais was built around 1830, on the site of a house that had belonged to the philologist and historian Henri de Valois.

The street was photographed by Charles Marville during his documentation of Haussman's renovation of Paris.
