= Author function =

The author function is the author as a function of discourse. The term was developed by Michel Foucault in his 1969 essay "What Is an Author?" where he discusses whether a text requires or is assigned an author. Foucault posits that the legal system was central in the rise of the author, as an author was needed (in order to be punished) for making transgressive statements. This is made evident through the rise of the printing press during the time of the Reformation, when religious texts that circulated challenged the authority of the Catholic Church.

The author function does not affect all texts in the same way. For example, the author of a science text book is not as clear or definable as the author of a novel. It is not a spontaneous creation or entity, but a carefully constructed social position.

== See also ==
- Roland Barthes
- Death of the Author
