= The Eiffel Tower and Other Mythologies =

Collection of essays by Roland Barthes

- Author: Roland Barthes
- Original title: La Tour Eiffel
- Translator: Richard Howard
- Language: French
- Subject: Semiotics, structuralism, cultural studies
- Publisher: University of California Press
- Publication date: 1979
- Publication place: France
- Pages: 152
- ISBN: 978-0-520-20982-4

The Eiffel Tower and Other Mythologies is a collection of essays by the French literary theorist Roland Barthes. It is a companion volume to his earlier book, Mythologies, and follows the same format of a series of short essays which explore a range of cultural phenomena, from the Tour de France to laundry detergents.
