= Mythologies (book) =

1957 book on semiotics by Roland Barthes

- Cover of the first edition
- Author: Roland Barthes
- Original title: Mythologies
- Translator: Annette Lavers
- Language: French
- Subjects: Semiotics; Structuralism
- Publisher: Les Lettres nouvelles
- Publication date: 1957
- Publication place: France
- English publication date: 1972 / 2012

Mythologies (French: Mythologies) is a 1957 book by Roland Barthes. It contains a collection of fifty-three short essays written between 1954 to 1956, most of which were first published in the French literary review Les Lettres nouvelles. In these essays, Barthes examines the tendency of contemporary social value systems (specifically that of the bourgeoisie) to create modern myths. In the book Barthes also analyzes the semiology of the process of myth creation itself, updating Ferdinand de Saussure's system of sign analysis by adding a second level where signs are elevated to the level of myth.

Mythologies was first published in English in abridged form in 1972. In 2012, Hill & Wang published a new English language edition of the book, Mythologies: The Complete Edition, in a New Translation, translated by Richard Howard (Part I: Mythologies) and Annette Lavers (Part II: Myth Today).

== Mythologies ==
Mythologies is divided into two parts: Mythologies and Myth Today, with the first section consisting of a collection of short essays on selected modern myths, and the second section offering an extended analysis of the concept. Each of the "mythologies" describes a modern cultural phenomena, ranging from "Einstein's Brain" to "Soap Powders and Detergents," chosen for their status as modern myths and for the meaning that has been conferred upon them.

In a typical example, Barthes describes the image that has been built up around red wine and how it has been adopted as a French national drink, how it is seen as a social equaliser and the drink of the proletariat, partly because it is seen as blood-like (as in Holy Communion) and points out that very little attention is paid to red wine's harmful effects to health, but that it is instead viewed as life-giving and refreshing — 'in cold weather, it is associated with all the myths of becoming warm, and at the height of summer, with all the images of shade, with all things cool and sparkling.'

In another chapter, Barthes explores the myth of professional wrestling. Unlike boxing, he writes, the aim of theatrical stunt fighting is not the winner's 'demonstration of excellence'. It is instead a staged spectacle, acting out society's basic concepts of good and evil (of 'Suffering, Defeat and Justice'). The actors pretending to be wrestlers, like characters in a pantomime, portray grossly exaggerated stereotypes of human weakness: the traitor, the conceited, the 'effeminate teddy-boy'. The audience expects to watch them suffer and be punished for their own transgressions of wrestling's rules in a theatrical version of society's ideology of justice.

=== Essays in the original English translation of Mythologies ===
- "The World of Wrestling" (professional wrestling)
- "The Romans in Films" (the 1953 American film Julius Caesar)
- "The Writer on Holiday" (an article in Le Figaro about André Gide's travels in the Congo)
- "The 'Blue Blood' Cruise" (a yacht cruise taken by European royalty to celebrate the coronation of Queen Elizabeth II)
- "Blind and Dumb Criticism"
- "Soap-powders and Detergents" (advertisements for Omo and Persil detergents)
- "The Poor and the Proletariat" (Charlie Chaplin)
- "Operation Margarine" (From Here to Eternity; the Jules Roy play Les Cyclones; Graham Greene's The Living Room; advertisements for Astra brand margarine)
- "Dominici, or the Triumph of Literature" (the Dominici Affair)
- "The Iconography of the Abbé Pierre"
- "Novels and Children" (Elle magazine on women novelists)
- "Toys"
- "The Face of Garbo" (Greta Garbo in Queen Christina)
- "Wine and Milk"
- "Steak and Chips"
- "The Nautilus and the Drunken Boat" (the novels of Jules Verne)
- "The Brain of Einstein"
- "The Jet-man"
- "The Blue Guide"
- "Ornamental Cookery" (food photography in Elle magazine)
- "Neither-Nor Criticism"
- "Striptease"
- "The New Citroën" (the Citroën DS 19)
- "Photography and Electoral Appeal" (photographs of French politicians)
- "The Lost Continent"
- "Astrology"
- "Plastic"
- "The Great Family of Man" (the touring photography exhibition known in English-speaking countries as The Family of Man)
- "The Lady of the Camellias"

== Myth today ==
In the second half of the book Barthes addresses the question of "What is a myth, today?" with the analysis of ideas such as: myth as a type of speech, and myth as a type of politics.

The front cover of the Paris Match magazine that Barthes analyzes

Following on from the first section, Barthes justifies and explains his choices and analysis. He calls upon the concepts of semiology developed by Ferdinand de Saussure, who described the connections between an object (the signified) and its linguistic representation (such as a word, the signifier) and how the two are connected. Working with this structure Barthes continues to show his idea of a myth as a further sign, with its roots in language, but to which something has been added. So with a word (or other linguistic unit) the meaning (apprehended content) and the sound come together to make a sign. To make a myth, the sign itself is used as a signifier, and a new meaning is added, which is the signified. But according to Barthes, this is not added arbitrarily. Although we are not necessarily aware of it, modern myths are created with a reason. As in the example of the red wine, mythologies are formed to perpetuate an idea of society that adheres to the current ideologies of the ruling class and its media.

Barthes demonstrates this theory with the example of a front cover from Paris Match edition no. 326, of July 1955, showing a young black soldier in French uniform saluting. The signifier, a saluting soldier, cannot offer us further factual information of the young man's life. But it has been chosen by the magazine to symbolise more than the young man; the picture, in combination with the signifieds of Frenchness, militariness, and relative ethnic difference, gives us a message about France and its citizens. The picture does not explicitly demonstrate 'that France is a great empire, that all her sons, without any colour discrimination, faithfully serve under her flag,' etc., but the combination of the signifier and signified perpetuates the myth of imperial devotion, success and thus, a property of 'significance' for the picture.

I am at the barber’s, and copy of Paris-Match is offered to me. On the cover, a young Negro in a French uniform is saluting, with his eyes uplifted, probably fixed on a fold of the tricolour. All this is the meaning of the picture. But whether naively or not, I see very well what it signifies to me: that France is a great Empire, that all her sons, without any colour discrimination, faithfully serve under the flag, and that there is no better answer to the detractors of an alleged colonialism than the zeal shown by this Negro in serving his so-called oppressors ...

=== Myth and power ===
Exploring the concept of myth, Barthes seeks to grasp the relations between language and power. He assumes that myth helps to naturalize particular worldviews.

According to Barthes, myth is based on humans’ history, and myth cannot naturally occur. There are always some communicative intentions in myth. Created by people, myth can easily be changed or destroyed. Also, myth depends on the context where it exists. By changing the context, one can change the effects of myth. At the same time, myth itself participates in the creation of an ideology. According to Barthes, myth doesn't seek to show or to hide the truth when creating an ideology, it seeks to deviate from the reality. The major function of myth is to naturalize a concept, a belief. Myth purifies signs and fills them with a new meaning which is relevant to the communicative intentions of those who are creating the myth. In the new sign, there are no contradictions that could raise any doubts regarding the myth. Myth is not deep enough to have these contradictions; it simplifies the world by making people believe that signs have inherent meaning. Myth “abolishes the complexity of human acts, it gives them the simplicity of essences…”

Furthermore, Barthes states that: 'The power of myth is in its impressive character. It seeks to surprise the audience. This impression is far more powerful than any rational explanations which can disprove the myth. Myth works not because it hides its intentions, but because the intentions of myth have been naturalized. Through the usage of myths, one can naturalize “the Empire, [the] taste for Basque things, the Government.”'

Speaking of myth and power, Barthes asserts that myth is a depoliticized speech. He uses the term ex-nomination (or exnomination), by which he "means 'outside of naming'. Barthes' point was that dominant groups or ideas in society become so obvious or common sense that they don't have to draw attention to themselves by giving themselves a name. They're just the 'normality', against which everything else can be judged." For example, he says, "[the bourgeoisie] makes its status undergo a real ex-nominating operation: the bourgeoisie is defined as the social class which does not want to be named" (italics in original). Myth removes our understanding of concepts and beliefs as created by humans. Instead, myth presents them as something natural and innocent. Drawing upon Karl Marx, Barthes states that even the most natural objects include some aspect of politics. Depending on how strong the political side of myth is, Barthes defines the strong and the weak myths (des mythes forts et des mythes faibles). Depoliticization of the strong myths happens abruptly, as the strong myths are explicitly political. The weak myths are the myths which have already lost their political character. However, this character can be brought back by “the slightest thing”.

The model of semiosis suggested by Barthes.

Barthes also provides a list of rhetorical figures in bourgeois myths:

- The inoculation. The government admits the harm brought by one of the institutes. Focusing on one institute, myth hides the inconsistency of the system. Inoculation consists in "admitting the accidental evil of a class-bound institution in order to conceal its principal evil." A "small inoculation of acknowledged evil" protects against "the risk of a generalized subversion."
- The privation of History. A history standing behind a myth gets removed. People don't wonder where the myth comes from; they simply believe it.
- Identification. The ideology of the bourgeoisie seeks sameness and denies all concepts that don't fit into its system. The bourgeoisie either ignores subjects that differ from them, or they strive to make this subject the same as the bourgeoisie.
- Tautology. The myths of the bourgeoisie define the concepts through the same concepts (Barthes provides an example of theatre, “Drama is drama”)
- Neither-Norism (le ninisme). Two concepts are defined by each other, and both of the concepts are considered inconsistent.
- The quantification of quality. Myth measures reality by numbers, not by quality. This way, myth simplifies reality.
- The statement of fact. Myth doesn't explain the reality. Myth asserts a certain picture of the world without explanation just like a proverb does.

The model of semiosis suggested by Barthes seeks to link signs with the social myths or ideologies that they articulate.

== Mythologisation and cultural studies ==
Barthes refers to the tendency of socially constructed notions, narratives, and assumptions to become "naturalized" in the process, that is, taken unquestioningly as given within a particular culture. Barthes concludes Mythologies by examining how and why myths are established by the bourgeoisie in its various manifestations. He returns to this theme in later works, including The Fashion System.

There are analogies between Mythologies (1957) and Marshal McLuhan's The Mechanical Bride (1951), in which a series popular mass culture products (such as advertisements and magazine articles) are exhibited and critically analyzed.

== English-language editions ==
Mythologies was first published in English in 1972, translated by Annette Lavers and issued by Jonathan Cape in England and by Hill & Wang in the United States. This abridged English-language edition included the book’s explanatory analysis, “Myth Today,” in full, but excluded twenty-five of the book’s original fifty-three essays.

In 2012, Hill & Wang published a new unabridged edition of the book, Mythologies: The Complete Edition, in a New Translation, with all fifty-three essays newly translated by Richard Howard, some of which appear in English for the first time. This edition retains Annette Lavers’ full translation of Barthes’ explanatory analysis, “Myth Today,” as the second part of the book.

== See also ==
- Camera Lucida
- Nouvelles Mythologies
- On Photography
- Photography and Non-Logical Form

== Bibliography ==
- Barthes, Roland, Mythologies. Paris, Editions du Seuil, 1957.
- Barthes, Roland, translated by Annette Lavers. Mythologies. London, Paladin, 1972. ISBN 0-374-52150-6. Expanded edition (now containing the previously untranslated 'Astrology'), with a new introduction by Neil Badmington, published by Vintage (UK), 2009. ISBN 978-0-09-952975-0
- Barthes, Roland, translated by Richard Howard. The Eiffel Tower and Other Mythologies. New York, Hill and Wang, 1979. ISBN 0-520-20982-6
- Welch, Liliane. "Reviews: Mythologies by Roland Barthes: Annette Lavers." The Journal of Aesthetics and Art Criticism. Volume 31, Number 4. (Summer 1973).
