= Charles Marville =

French photographer (1816–1879)

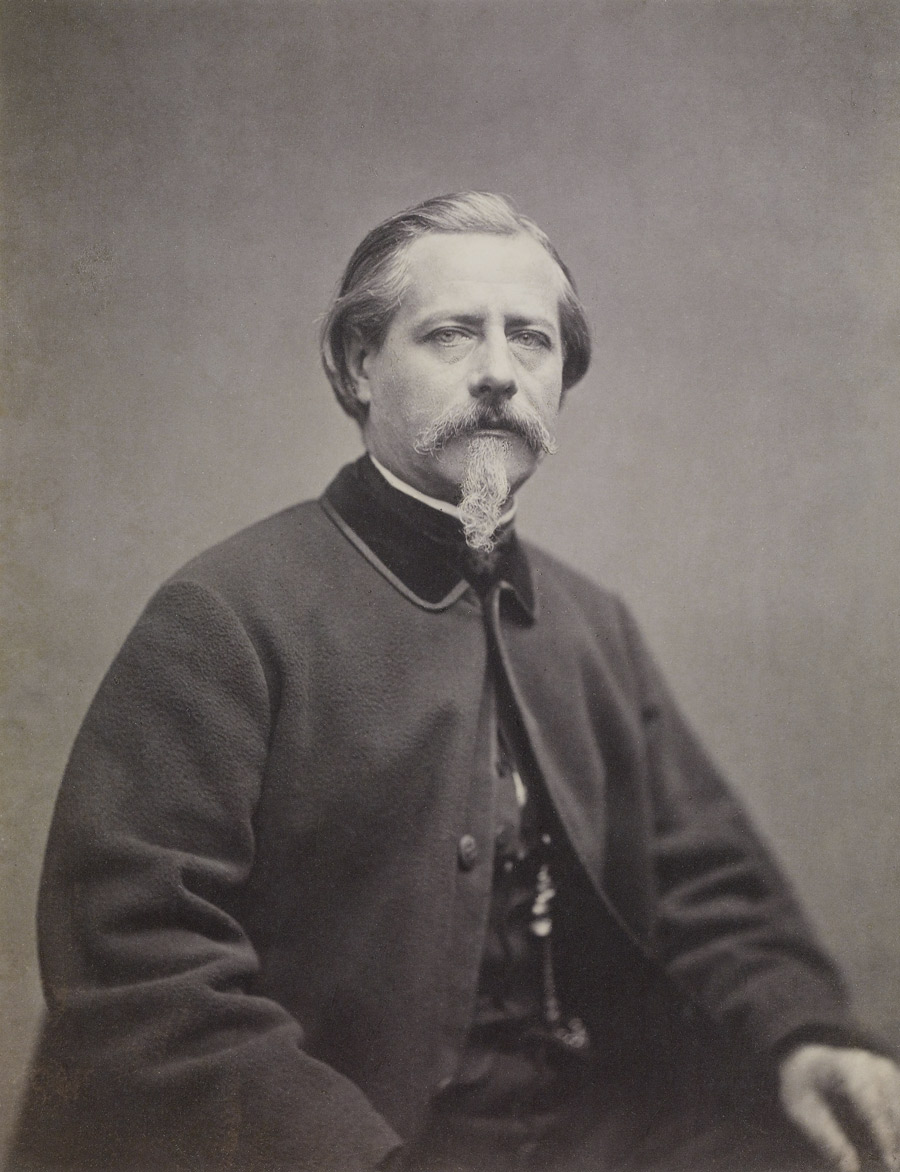
Charles Marville, photographic self-portrait, c. 1861

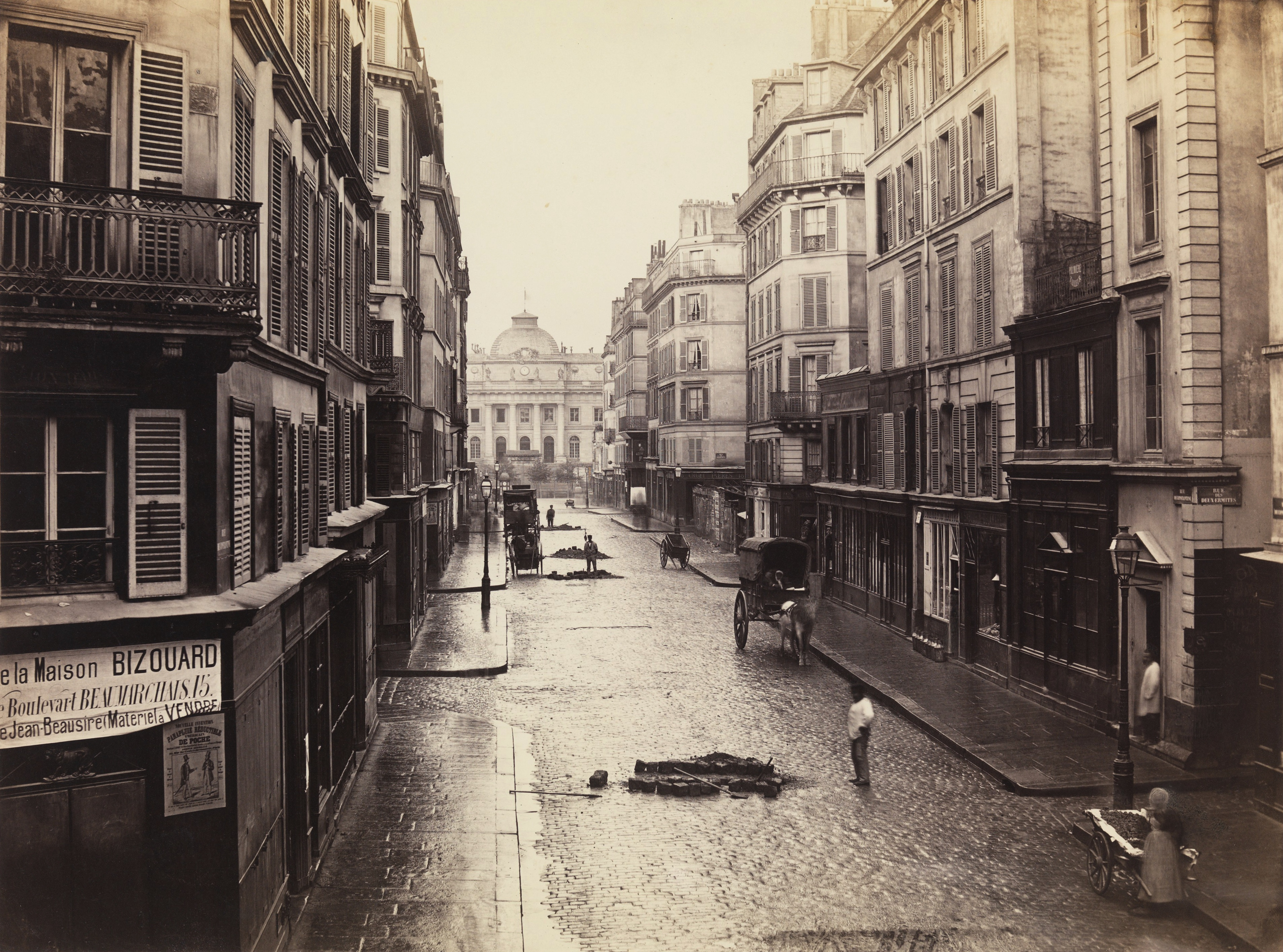
"Rue de Constantine", c. 1865

Charles Marville, the pseudonym of Charles François Bossu (18 July 1816 – 1 June 1879), was a French photographer, who mainly photographed architecture, landscapes and the urban environment. He used both paper and glass negatives. He is most well known for taking pictures of ancient Parisian quarters before they were destroyed and rebuilt under "Haussmannization", Baron Haussmann's plan for modernization of Paris. "Marville created a model of photographic perception of the architectural environment that we still use and rely on today". In 1862, he was named official photographer of Paris.

Art historian Ekaterina Vasilyeva notes that two points attract attention in Marville's photographs: complete indifference to pictorial photography, which at that time was the main form of artistic thinking, and attention to visual solutions that were non-standard for that moment.

== Biography ==
Marville's past was largely a mystery until Sarah Kennel of the National Gallery of Art and independent researcher Daniel Catan discovered that Marville's given name was Charles-François Bossu. That newly-found association allowed them to discover a variety of biographical information, including photographs of his family which had been considered lost to time.

Bossu was born in 1816 in Paris. Coming from an "established" Parisian family, he trained as a painter, illustrator and engraver. Concerned that his name would cause professional difficulties (bossu means "hunchback" in French), he assumed the pseudonym Charles Marville around 1832, and began working in his field. For ten years, his primary activity was producing illustrations on wooden blocks for later engraving and printing (woodblock printing). The demands of composition on the small rectangular blocks, in the reverse of what would be the final appearance when printed, are similar to the constraints of composition on the ground glass of a view camera.

The invention of the calotype, with its potential for reproducibility, led him to take up photography around 1850, after 17 years working as an illustrator. His earliest known photographs were made while working for Louis Désiré Blanquart-Evrard, who started one of the world's first photographic publishing firms providing images for artists, designers, and collectors.

In 1853, he was commissioned to photograph Notre Dame Cathedral decorated for the marriage of Napoleon III; three years later, he photographed the baptism of the emperor's son, Eugène-Louis.

After the firm of Blanquart-Evrard closed in 1855, Marville began to find other clients for his work, as well as working as a printer and distributor for several photographers working in the Middle East and North Africa.

Beginning in 1858, he was charged––by the municipal administration and by individual architects––with photographing renewal projects in Paris. In 1862, he was officially named "Photographer of the City of Paris." This position entailed both documenting old streets that were earmarked for destruction, showing their overcrowded state, with little light or sanitary amenities, and photographing the new streets and monuments to show the beauty and improved quality of life that the renovations had brought to the capital. These photos were shown side-by-side at the Exposition Universelle of 1878.

He was also made an income documenting artwork from 1859 on, proposing to document all work under consideration at the Louvre, though he did not become official photographer to the Louvre until 1861 under the director Count Émilien de Nieuwerkerke. He made significant albums of photographic reproductions of drawings from the Louvre, Egyptian artifacts working with Auguste Mariette, and returned from a trip to Italy with over 100 plates of reproductions of drawings by Italian masters as well as a gold medal from the Italian king, Vittorio Emmanuele. He also photographed for many contemporary artists, of greater and lesser stature. His documentation of Ingres' drawings for the sculptor and medal engraver Jacques-Édouard Gatteaux is still invaluable to scholars, as the originals were destroyed by fire in 1871. He also took a celebrated photograph of Ingres on his deathbed.

Marville was commissioned to photograph the ruins of the old Hôtel de Ville, which had been destroyed during the Paris Commune, and then to document the rebuilding process. He died in 1879, before this project could be completed. He had no family, but a long-time companion, Jeanne-Louise Leuba, was included in his will.

== Exhibition ==
In 2013, the National Gallery of Art with The Metropolitan Museum of Art and the Museum of Fine Arts, Houston organized an exhibit profiling Marville’s work in Charles Marville: Photographer of Paris. The show began at the National Gallery (September 29, 2013 – January 5, 2014) before travelling to the Metropolitan Museum (January 27-May 4, 2014) and Museum of Fine Arts, Houston (June 15-September 14, 2014).

== Publications ==
- Sarah Kennel. Charles Marville: Photographer of Paris 2013 University of Chicago Press; exhibition catalog ISBN 978-0226092782
- Vasilyeva E. (2022) 36 essays on photographers. St. Petersburg: Palmira. pp. 121 - 132.
- Bertrand Lemoine, Charles Marville, 1813-1879, du pinceau à la chambre noire, Presses des Ponts, 2024, 656 pages (text in French) (ISBN 978-2-85978-572-7).
