= Raymond Picard =

French scholar

- Born: 6 August 1917; Paris
- Died: 5 September 1975 (aged 58); Bligny, Aube
- Occupation: Literary critic

Raymond Picard (6 August 1917 – 5 September 1975) was a French author, prominent Sorbonne professor and Jean Racine scholar.

== Work ==
Picard is noted for his scathing tract "Nouvelle critique ou nouvelle imposture?" ("New Criticism or New Fraud?"), which was aimed at the "subjective" analytical approach of Roland Barthes (as found in "On Racine") and other non-traditional approaches by writers and academics of "New Criticism", including Lucien Goldmann, Charles Mauron, Jean-Paul Weber and Jean-Pierre Richard. Barthes' response to this critique came in the form of Critique et vérité, which postulated a 'science of criticism' to replace the 'university criticism' perpetuated by Picard and his colleagues The heated, public debate between Picard and Barthes became somewhat of a watershed moment in the development of literary structuralism. Picard felt that "Barthes was 'the instrument of a criticism that operates by instinct,' that uses a pseudoscientific jargon to make inept and absurd assertions in the name of biological, psychoanalytic and philosophic knowledge" and of "New Criticism" believed that "the mixture of impressionism and dogmatism set to a modernist rhythm of indetermination 'makes it possible to say absolutely any stupid thing'."

== Bibliography ==
- The Career of Jean Racine
- The Complete Works of Racine
- New Criticism or New Fraud?
