= Open text =

In semiotic analysis (the studies of signs or symbols), an open text is a text that allows multiple or mediated interpretation by the readers. In contrast, a closed text leads the reader to one intended interpretation.

The concept of the "open text" comes from Umberto Eco's collection of essays The Role of the Reader, but it is also derivative of Roland Barthes's distinction between 'readerly' (lisible) and 'writerly' (scriptible) texts as set out in his 1968 essay "The Death of the Author".

== Content ==
In this essay, Umberto Eco describes a special kind of musical works that can be organized and re-organized by the performers before they are played to the audience. He then applied this idea of "open works" to literary texts and other works of art.

Every work of art can be read, according to Eco, in three distinct ways: the moral, the allegorical and the anagogical. Each is not only distinct but can be fully anticipated and directed by the author (or the artist) of the work. An example of this kind of reading is found in the stories by Kafka, in which his symbolic actions cannot be read in one definitive way; each reading will end up with similar and multiple meanings.

The reader will read a certain work differently every time, depending on his/her emotional state, physical state and political world view. We can find an example of this in plays written by Brecht, which are "open" in the same way that an argument between two people is open: both sides (the actors and the viewers) want and anticipate a solution at the end, but no solution ever comes, leaving us to wander to find meaning.

Umberto Eco makes a distinction between these kinds of works, which are "open" in their interpretation, to the musical works from the beginning, which are open in their structural sense. These kinds of "openness" is not only for musical works, it might be any kind of artistic work (painting, poem, performance etc.)

This kind of "openness" is derived from the science of the time, he says. When people believed in a geocentric world, they expected every work of art to have only one definitive interpretation, but as people found out about the universe and the magnitude of stars in the sky and their hierarchy, they began to expect more ideas to be interpreted from every work.

He continues by comparing open works to Quantum mechanics, and he arrives at the conclusion that open works are more like Einstein's idea of the universe, which is governed by precise laws but seems random at first. The artist in those open works arranges the work carefully so it could be re-organized by another but still keep the original voice or intent of the artist.

Every work can be read in infinite ways, depending on an individual's state of mind and perspective, and it also depends on a third person intervention, either the players of the orchestra or the curator at the museum. Eco understand the difficulties with this perspective, but he ends by saying that this article, as all works, is still a "work in movement", an "open work" and still a "work in progress".

== See also ==
- cf. open data, open access
