= Art for art's sake =

Slogan for art without any didactic, moral or utilitarian function

Art for art's sake—the usual English rendering of l'art pour l'art (pronounced [laʁ puʁ laʁ]), a French slogan from the latter half of the 19th century—is a phrase that expresses the philosophy that 'true' art is utterly independent of all social values and utilitarian functions, be they didactic, moral, or political. Such works are sometimes described as autotelic (from Greek: autoteles, 'complete in itself'), a concept also applied to "inner-directed" or "self-motivated" persons.

The phrase is sometimes used commercially. A Latin version of this phrase, ars gratia artis (Classical Latin: [ˈars ˈɡraːtiaː ˈartɪs]), is used as a motto by Metro-Goldwyn-Mayer film studio, appearing in the film scroll around the roaring head of Leo the Lion in its logo, despite being ungrammatical: in Latin gratiā follows the noun, so it should be ars artis gratiā.

== History ==
The phrase "l'art pour l'art" had been used by Parisian intellectuals since the beginning of the 19th century, but it was Théophile Gautier (1811–1872) who first fully articulated its current metaphysical meaning in the prefaces of his 1832 poetry volume Albertus and 1835 novel Mademoiselle de Maupin.

The phrase also appeared in the lectures and writings of Victor Cousin and Benjamin Constant. In his essay "The Poetic Principle" (1850) Edgar Allan Poe argues:

We have taken it into our heads that to write a poem simply for the poem's sake, and to acknowledge such to have been our design, would be to confess ourselves radically wanting in the true poetic dignity and force:– but the simple fact is that would we but permit ourselves to look into our own souls we should immediately there discover that under the sun there neither exists nor can exist any work more thoroughly dignified, more supremely noble, than this very poem, this poem per se, this poem which is a poem and nothing more, this poem written solely for the poem's sake.

"Art for the sake of art" became a bohemian creed in the 19th century; a slogan raised in defiance of those—from John Ruskin to the later Communist advocates of socialist realism—who thought that the value of art was to serve some moral or didactic purpose. It was a rejection of the Marxist aim of politicising art. "Art for the sake of art" affirmed that art was valuable in itself; that artistic pursuits did not need moral justification, and indeed, could legitimately be morally neutral or subversive.

James McNeill Whistler wrote the following, deprecating the accustomed role of art in the service of the state or official religion, as had been common practice since the Counter-Reformation of the 16th century: "Art should be independent of all claptrap – should stand alone...and appeal to the artistic sense of eye or ear, without confounding this with emotions entirely foreign to it, as devotion, pity, love, patriotism and the like." In this brusque dismissal, the artist also rejected sentimentalism. All that remains of Romanticism in this statement is the reliance on the artist's own eye and sensibility as the arbiter.

In English art and letters, the slogan is associated with Walter Pater and his Aesthetic Movement, which self-consciously rebelled against Victorian moralism. It first appeared in print in English in Algernon Charles Swinburne's study William Blake (1866) and soon after in Pater's review of William Morris's poetry in the Westminster Review (1868). However, William Makepeace Thackeray had used the term privately in an 1839 letter to his mother in which he recommended Thomas Carlyle's Miscellanies, writing that Carlyle had done more than any other to give "art for art's sake ... its independence." A modified form of Pater's review appeared in his Studies in the History of the Renaissance (1873), one of the most influential texts of the Aesthetic Movement.

Arnold Bennett made the facetious riposte: "Am I to sit still and see other fellows pocketing two guineas apiece for stories which I can do better myself? Not me. If anyone imagines my sole aim is art for art's sake, they are cruelly deceived."

In Germany, the poet Stefan George was one of the first artists to translate the phrase (Kunst für die Kunst) and adopt it for his own literary programme, presented in the first volume of his literary magazine Blätter für die Kunst (1892). He was inspired mainly by Charles Baudelaire and the French Symbolists whom he had met in Paris, where he was friends with Albert Saint-Paul and consorted with the circle around Stéphane Mallarmé.

== Criticism ==
=== By Nietzsche ===
Friedrich Nietzsche argued that there is 'no art for art's sake', the arts always express human values and communicate core beliefs:

When the purpose of moral preaching and of improving man has been excluded from art, it still does not follow by any means that art is altogether purposeless, aimless, senseless—in short, l'art pour l'art, a worm chewing its own tail. "Rather no purpose at all than a moral purpose!"—that is the talk of mere passion. A psychologist, on the other hand, asks: what does all art do? does it not praise? glorify? choose? prefer? With all this it strengthens or weakens certain valuations. Is this merely a "moreover"? an accident? something in which the artist's instinct had no share? Or is it not the very presupposition of the artist's ability? Does his basic instinct aim at art, or rather at the sense of art, at life? at a desirability of life? Art is the great stimulus to life: how could one understand it as purposeless, as aimless, as l'art pour l'art?

=== By Marxists and socialists ===
Marxists have argued that art should be politicised for the sake of transmitting the socialist message.

George Sand, who was not a Marxist but a socialist writer, wrote in 1872 that L'art pour l'art was an empty phrase, an idle sentence. She asserted that artists had a "duty to find an adequate expression to convey it to as many souls as possible," ensuring that their works were accessible enough to be appreciated.

Senegalese president and co-founder of Negritude Léopold Sédar Senghor and anti-colonial writer Chinua Achebe have both criticized the slogan as a limited, Eurocentric view on art and creation. Senghor argued that, in "black African aesthetics," art is "functional" and that in "black Africa, 'art for art's sake' does not exist." Achebe is more scathing in his collection of essays and criticism entitled Morning Yet on Creation Day, in which he asserts that "art for the sake of art is just another piece of deodorised dog shit."

Walter Benjamin, one of the developers of Marxist hermeneutics, discusses the slogan in his seminal 1936 essay "The Work of Art in the Age of Mechanical Reproduction". He first mentions it in regard to the reaction within the realm of traditional art to innovations in reproduction, in particular photography. He even terms the "L'art pour l'art" slogan as part of a "theology of art" in bracketing off social aspects. In the Epilogue to his essay, Benjamin discusses the links between fascism and art. His main example is that of Futurism and the thinking of its mentor Filippo Tommaso Marinetti. One of the slogans of the Futurists was "Fiat ars – pereat mundus" ('Let art be created, though the world perish'). Provocatively, Benjamin concludes that as long as fascism expects war "to supply the artistic gratification of a sense of perception that has been changed by technology," then this is the "consummation," the realization, of "L'art pour l'art."

Diego Rivera, who was a member of the Mexican Communist Party and "a supporter of the revolutionary cause," claims that the art for the sake of art theory would further divide the rich from the poor. Rivera goes on to say that since one of the characteristics of so-called "pure art" was that it could only be appreciated by a few superior people, the art movement would strip art of its value as a social tool and ultimately make art into a currency-like item that would only be available to the rich.

Chinese communist leader Mao Zedong said: "There is in fact no such thing as art for art's sake, art that stands above classes, art that is detached from or independent of politics. Proletarian literature and art are part of the whole proletarian revolutionary cause; they are, as Lenin said, cogs and wheels in the whole revolutionary machine."

== See also ==
- Critical theory
- Intrinsic motivation
- Parnassianism
- Art for art
- Naïve art
- Outsider art
