= Criticism and Truth =

- First edition (French)
- Author: Roland Barthes
- Original title: Critique et verité
- Translator: Katrine Pilcher Keuneman
- Language: French
- Publisher: The Athlone Press
- Publication date: 1966
- Publication place: France
- English publication date: 1987
- Media type: Print (Softcover)

Criticism and Truth (French: Critique et vérité) is a 1966 work by Roland Barthes, first translated into English in 1987.

The book is a response to Raymond Picard's criticism of Barthes' earlier 1963 work, Sur Racine. The feud between Barthes and Picard is credited with spreading Barthes' name outside France.
