= Camera Lucida (book) =

Book by Roland Barthes

- Cover of the first edition
- Author: Roland Barthes
- Original title: La Chambre claire
- Translator: Richard Howard
- Language: French
- Subject: Photography, philosophy
- Publisher: Hill and Wang
- Publication date: 1980
- Publication place: France
- English publication date: 1981
- Media type: Print (Softcover)
- ISBN: 0-8090-3340-2
- OCLC: 7307145
- Dewey Decimal: 770/.1 19
- LC Class: TR642 .B3713 1981

Camera Lucida: Reflections on Photography (French: La Chambre claire, pronounced [la ʃɑ̃bʁ klɛʁ]) is a short book published in 1980 by the French literary theorist and philosopher Roland Barthes. It is simultaneously an inquiry into the nature and essence of photography and a eulogy to Barthes' late mother. The book investigates the effects of photography on the spectator (as distinct from the photographer, and also from the object photographed, which Barthes calls the "spectrum").

In a deeply personal discussion of the lasting emotional effect of certain photographs, Barthes considers photography as asymbolic, irreducible to the codes of language or culture, acting on the body as much as on the mind. The book develops the twin concepts of studium and punctum: studium denoting the cultural, linguistic, and political interpretation of a photograph, punctum denoting the wounding, personally touching detail which establishes a direct relationship with the object or person within it.

Camera Lucida, which takes its name from the optical device the camera lucida, consists of 48 chapters divided into two parts. The book is composed in free form and does not follow a particularly rigid structure. Barthes does not present a fixed thesis, but instead, highlights the evolution of his thought process as the book unfolds. As such, he consistently returns to ideas expressed in previous chapters to complete them, or even deny them. The story becomes increasingly personal in the second half, as scientific terminology, precise vocabulary, and numerous scholarly and cultural references give way to increasingly subjective and intimate language. The book is illustrated by 25 photographs, old and contemporary, chosen by the author. Among them are the works of famous photographers such as William Klein, Robert Mapplethorpe and Nadar, in addition to a photograph from Barthes' private collection.

== Context ==
Camera Lucida, along with Susan Sontag's On Photography, was one of the most important early academic books of criticism and theorization on photography. Neither writer was a photographer, however, and both works have been much criticised. Nevertheless, it was by no means Barthes's earliest approach to the subject. Barthes mentions photography in one of his 'little mythologies'—articles published in the journal Les Lettres Nouvelles starting in 1954, and gathered in Mythologies, published in 1957 (and in English translation in 1972). The article "Photography and Electoral Appeal" is more obviously political than Camera Lucida.

In the 1960s and entering the next decade, Barthes's analysis of photography develops more detail and insight through a structuralist approach; the treatment of photography in Mythologies is by comparison tangential and simple. There is still in this structural phase a strong political impulse and background to his theorizing of photography; Barthes connects photography's ability to represent without style (a 'perfect analogon': "The Photographic Message", 1961) to its tendency to naturalise what are in fact invented and highly structured meanings. His examples deal with press photographs and advertising, which make good use of this property (or bad use of it, as the case may be).

Published two months prior to his death in 1980, Camera Lucida is Barthes's first and only book devoted to photography. By now his tactics in writing, always shifting and complex, favouring the dialectical to the morally or politically 'committed' (Sartre), had once again changed. If sentimentality can be seen as a tactic in the late career of Roland Barthes, then Camera Lucida belongs to such an approach. It is novelistic, in line with the developments towards this new type of writing which Barthes had shown with A Lover's Discourse and Roland Barthes by Roland Barthes. However, the ideas about photography in Camera Lucida are certainly prepared in essays like "The Photographic Message", "Rhetoric of the Image" (1964), and "The Third Meaning" (1971). There is a movement through these three pieces of which Camera Lucida can be seen as the culmination. With "The Third Meaning" there is the suggestion that the photograph's reality, aside from all the messages it can be loaded with, might constitute an avant-garde value: not a message as such, aimed at the viewer/reader, but another kind of meaning that arises almost accidentally yet without being simply 'the material' or 'the accidental'; this is the eponymous third meaning. This essay of 1970, ostensibly about some Eisenstein stills, anticipates many of Camera Lucida's ideas and connects them back to still earlier ones. One could almost swap the term third meaning for the punctum of Camera Lucida.

Yet the personal note of pain in Camera Lucida is not present in these earlier writings and is unmistakable. Written after his mother's death, Camera Lucida is as much a reflection on death as it is on photography. Barthes died after being struck by a laundry van soon after the publication of Camera Lucida, and many have read the book as Barthes' eulogy for himself.

== Influence ==
Camera Lucida has been widely read and cited in discussions of photography. Writing in 2009, Geoffrey Batchen described it as "perhaps the most influential book yet written about the photographic experience" and noted that it is "surely the most quoted book in the photographic canon," introducing terms such as studium and punctum into the vocabulary of photographic discourse. The book had gone through eighteen printings by 1996, and its vocabulary and allusive style have been noted as influential in photographic writing.

The book has also been cited as influential by a number of artists. According to Dillon, photographers and visual artists including Gerhard Richter, Christian Boltanski, Tacita Dean, and Fiona Tan have produced work that engages with Barthes's concept of the photograph as an "imperious sign" of death. Dillon also notes that the writer W. G. Sebald acknowledged a direct debt to Camera Lucida; in Austerlitz, the protagonist's search for an image of his lost mother has been compared to Barthes's own account.

== Editions ==
=== First edition ===
- Roland Barthes, La chambre claire : Note sur la photographie, Paris, Seuil, 1980. 193 p.

=== English translation ===
- Barthes, Roland. Camera Lucida. New York: Hill and Wang, 1981. 119 p.

== See also ==
- On Photography
- Photography and Non-Logical Form
