= Writing Degree Zero =

1953 book by Roland Barthes

- Cover of the first edition
- Author: Roland Barthes
- Original title: Le degré zéro de l'écriture
- Language: French
- Publication date: 1953
- Publication place: France

Writing Degree Zero (French: Le degré zéro de l'écriture) is a book of literary criticism by Roland Barthes. First published in 1953, it was Barthes' first full-length book and was intended, as Barthes writes in the introduction, as "no more than an Introduction to what a History of Writing might be."

== Structure ==
Writing Degree Zero is divided into two parts, with a stand-alone introduction. Part One contains four short essays, in which Barthes distinguishes the concept of a "writing" from that of a "style" or "language". In Part Two, Barthes examines various modes of modern writing and criticises French socialist realist writers on the grounds that they typically employ conventional literary tropes that are at odds with their expressed revolutionary convictions. Barthes quotes a passage from the communist novelist Roger Garaudy and comments:

We see that nothing here is given without metaphor, for it must be laboriously borne home to the reader that "it is well written" (that is, that what he is consuming is Literature).

Against what he describes as "the well-behaved writing of revolutionaries", Barthes praises the work of writers who "create a colourless writing, freed from all bondage to a pre-ordained state of language". Barthes credits Albert Camus with the initiation of this "transparent form of speech", specifically Camus' 1942 novel The Stranger. However, Barthes also praises the novelist and poet Raymond Queneau for allowing the patterns of spoken speech in his fiction to "contaminate all the parts of the written discourse", as against Jean-Paul Sartre, in whose novels only the spoken dialogue resembled spoken language, with the result that naturalness of the dialogue in Sartre's novels resembled "arias, so to speak, surrounded by long recitatives in an entirely conventional mode of writing". Barthes ends the book on a literally Utopian note:

Feeling permanently guilty of its own solitude, it [literary writing] is none the less an imagination eagerly desiring a felicity [bonheur] of words, it hastens towards a dreamed-of language whose freshness, by a kind of ideal anticipation, might portray the perfection of some Adamic world where language would no longer be alienated.

== Translation ==
Le degré zéro de l'écriture was translated into English by Annette Lavers and Colin Smith as Writing Degree Zero and published in 1967 by Jonathan Cape.

The Lavers/Smith translation departs from the original in some respects. For example, the opening sentence of the original is:

- "Hébert ne commençait jamais un numéro du Père Duchêne sans y mettre quelques «foutre» et quelques «bougre».";
- literally: "Hébert never began a number of Le Père Duchêne without putting in a few 'fuck's and 'bugger's";
- Lavers/Smith translation: "Hébert, the revolutionary, never began a number of his news-sheet Le Père Duchêne without introducing a sprinkling of obscenities."

== See also ==
- Le Monde's 100 Books of the Century
- Cape Editions
