= Lisible =

Word

Lisible is a word from the French for 'legible' used to denote a text that requires no true participation from its audience. It was coined by the French literary critic Roland Barthes in his book S/Z and expanded from his essay "The Death of the Author". Barthes contrasts texte lisible, denoting a closed work, with texte scriptible, a text open to interpretation. In Barthes's opinion, lisible works provide no challenge to the reader's preconceived notions and thus are inferior to scriptible works, exemplified by modernist literature. Barthes contends that lisible works still emphasize the importance of the author, whereas for scriptible texts "the reader is the very space in which are inscribed, without any being lost, all the citations a writing consists of; the unity of a text is not in its origin, it is in its destination."
