= Les Lettres nouvelles =

Les Lettres nouvelles was a French literary journal, published from 1953 to 1977. It was founded by Maurice Nadeau and Maurice Saillet and published by Mercure de France.

Les Lettres nouvelles first published Samuel Beckett's "Imagination Dead Imagine" and his French translation of Krapp's Last Tape, the French translation of Dylan Thomas's Under Milk Wood, and (between 1954 and 1956) Roland Barthes's recurring column "Mythology of the Month" (later collected as Barthes's Mythologies).
