= Ekaterina Vasileva (art historian) =

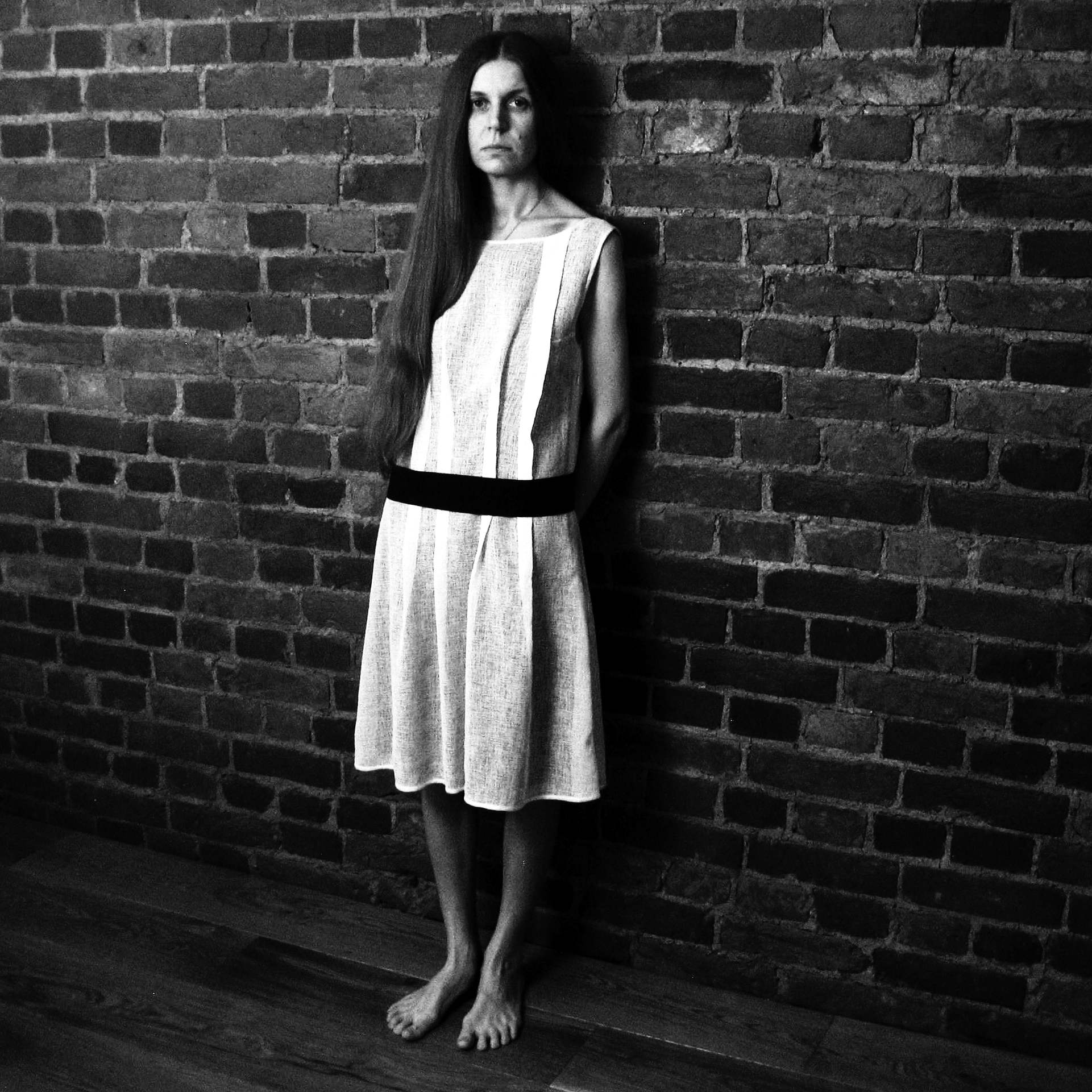
- Born: Ekaterina Viktorovna Vasileva; 29 July 1972; Leningrad, Russian SFSR
- Education: Saint Petersburg State University
- Occupations: Art historian, educator, art critic

Ekaterina Viktorovna Vasileva (born July 29, 1972) is a Russian art critic, specialist in the history and theory of photography, fashion, design and contemporary art. Candidate of Sciences, Associate Professor at Saint Petersburg State University. Member of the Union of Artists of Russia, member of the Union of Photographers of Russia, member of the International Association of Art Critics (AICA, UNESCO), member of the Union of Journalists of Russia. The works of Ekaterina Vasilyeva are in the collections of the largest Russian libraries, as well as in the collections of the Library of Congress (Washington), the Warburg Library (London), and the Cini Foundation Library (Venice).

== Biography ==
In 1994 she graduated from the Faculty of History of Saint Petersburg State University. In 2005, under the guidance of Tatyana Gorbunova, she defended her doctoral dissertation “The Image of the City in Artistic Photography of France in the second half of the 19th – early 20th centuries” (official opponents: T.E. Shekhter and G.N. Gabriel). Associate Professor, Faculty of Arts, Saint Petersburg State University. Teaches the theory of contemporary art, design, photography and fashion at Saint Petersburg State University, European University at Saint Petersburg, Higher School of Economics (Moscow), and Garage Museum of Contemporary Art (Moscow).

Author of numerous studies on photography theory, fashion and contemporary art. She has taken part in educational and research meetings at the Hamburger Kunsthalle, the Uffizi Gallery Library (Florence) and the Querini Stampaglia Foundation (Venice). Analyst of the Venice Biennale, Venice Biennale of Architecture and exhibition projects of the Cini Foundation. Member of the Fulbright program and research projects of the Giorgio Cini Foundation, Venice. Laureate and participant of state grants in the field of culture. One of the leading experts in the field of fashion theory and photography.

== Research ==
=== Theory and history of photography ===
Ekaterina Vasilyeva is the author of normative theories devoted to the study of photography as an analytical discipline. The principles mentioned in the book «Photography and Non-Logical Form» form the basic concepts in the field of photography. The author's analytical program connects the forms of modern culture with the circumstances of archaic consciousness and illogical thinking. Scientific interests: linguistic phenomenon, value theory, fashion concepts, theory of photography, theory of design. Author of research concepts on the study of photography and language, photography and the phenomenon of time, photography and illogical form, problems of character and personality in photography, the study of the traditional component in the fashion system.

=== History and theory of fashion ===
Ekaterina Vasilyeva is one of the few experts who considers fashion an analytical discipline. Author of the monograph “Fashion Theory”. Myth, Consumerism and Value System, as well as numerous articles on the history and theory of costume. Ekaterina Vasilyeva's research is related to the systematic study of the history and theory of fashion. In her works she touches on a wide range of problems related to the dynamics of social systems, the theory of social action, the culture of everyday life, the study of the ideological program of fashion, the study of the value system, the study of fashion as a linguistic system, the phenomenology of the body, the mythological program of fashion, the concept of novelty and the dichotomy of traditional culture. Author of extensive lecture projects on the history of fashion of the twentieth century.

=== History and theory of design ===
Author of formative theories on the history and theory of design, general theory of fashion, general theory of photography and the theory of artistic modernism (international style). She views design as a subject of academic study. Ekaterina Vasilyeva's works are related to the general theory of design, and are also dedicated to different periods and directions of design. In particular, areas such as Scandinavian design, Swiss style, international style, and International Typographic Style. It considers design from the point of view of the problem of the thing, the system of language and the problem of the ideal. Author of main concepts in the field of graphic and object design. Author of formative theories and research in the fields of international modernity, minimalism, Swiss style and Scandinavian design traditions.

== Educational and information projects ==
Works as an assistant professor at Saint Petersburg State University. Over the years, she was invited to give lectures at educational institutions such as Saint Petersburg State University, Saint Petersburg Stieglitz State Academy of Art and Design, Higher School of Economics (Moscow), European University (St. Petersburg), St. Petersburg. St. Petersburg State University of Technology and Design (St. Petersburg), Garage Museum of Contemporary Art (Moscow), Mikkeli University of Applied Sciences (Finland), Uppsala University (Sweden), Leipzig University (Germany).[2]

== In the field of fashion ==
Specialist in the field of fashion theory and the history of costume of the twentieth century. She views fashion as an analytical system. Author of normative concepts in the field of fashion theory. Author of a number of articles and lecture projects on the theory of fashion and the history of fashion design of the twentieth century. Analyst and regular contributor to magazine «Fashion Theory: The Journal of Dress, Body & Culture». Consultant and translator for fashion houses: Hermès, Chaumet, Salvatore Ferragamo, Sonia Rykiel, John Lobb, Wolford, Luciano Barbera, Luigi Borrelli, Borsalino, Faliero Sarti, Bosco di Ciliegi and others.

== Media ==
Expert in fashion journalism. Over the years - editor, columnist and author of Kommersant, Afisha, ELLE Decoration, ELLE, L'Officiel, Foto & Video publishing projects. She headed the St. Petersburg office of ELLE magazine. Editor of Kommersant and Kommersant Weekend publishing projects in St. Petersburg. Member of the Union of Journalists of Russia.

== Academic publication projects ==
Author, reviewer and editor of publication projects: Bulletin of St. Petersburg University, International Journal of Cultural Studies, Actual Problems of Theory and History of Art, Emergency Reserve, Fashion Theory: The Journal of Dress, Body & Culture.

== Selected scientific works ==
=== Monographs ===
- Vasiljeva E. Photography and illogical form. M.: Nová literární revue, 2019. 312 p.
- Vasiljeva E. Fashion Theory: Myth, Consumption and Value System. St. Petersburg; Moscow: RUGRAM_Palmira, 2023. 387 p.
- Vasiljeva E. 36 essays about photographers. St. Petersburg: Palmira, 2022. 255 p.
- Vasiljeva E. NA. City and shadow. Image of the city in artistic photography of the 19th - early 20th centuries. Saarbrücken: LAP LAMBERT, 2013. 280 p.

=== Articles ===
- Vasileva, Ekaterina. Fashion and the Question of the Symbolic: The Ideology of Value and Its Limits. Vestnik of Saint Petersburg University. Arts, 2023, No. 13(2), 376–392.
- Vasiljeva E. Fashion and minimalism: ideology, structure and form / Terra artis. Art and design. 2022. No. 3, pp. 12–27.
- Vasiljeva E. Photography: to the problem of things / Bulletin of St. Petersburg University. History of Art, 2022, v. 12, no. 2, pp. 275–294.
- Vasiljeva E. The body as an object: phenomenology of the body and the fashion system / Theory of fashion: clothing, body, culture. 2022. No. 1 (63). pp. 85–103.
- Vasiljeva E. Swiss style: prototypes, emergence and problem of regulations / Terra Artis, 2021, No. 3, pp. 84–101.
- Vasiljeva E. Fashion and its theoretical practice / Theory of fashion: clothing, body, culture. 2021. No. 3 (61). pp. 347–354.
- Vasiljeva E. Early urban photography: to the problem of iconography of space / International Journal of Cultural Studies, 2020, No. 1 (37), pp. 65–86.
- Vasiljeva E. "The scene in the library": the problem of the thing and the rhetoric of photography / International Journal of Cultural Studies. 2020. No. 3.
- Vasiljeva E. National romance and international style: to the problem of identity in the Finnish design system / Man. Culture. Education. 2020, 3 (37), pp. 57–72.
- Vasiljeva E. Petersburg fashion school: from minimalism to deconstruction / The transformation of the old and the search for the new in the culture and art of the 90s of the XX century. Materials of the scientific conference. St. Petersburg: Art Museum of St. Petersburg XX-XXI century, 2020. pp. 46–53.
- Vasiljeva E. Shukhov Stereography: Design and Space / Unknown Russian Photographic Art: A Collection of Articles. M.: Three squares, 2020.
- Vasiljeva E. Finnish Glass Design: Appropriation, Identity and the Problem of International Style / Fashion Theory: Body, Clothing, Culture. 2020, No. 55, pp. 259–280.
- Vasiljeva E. Fashion strategy: the phenomenon of the new and the principle of sustainability / Theory of fashion: clothing, body, culture. 2019, No. 54, pp. 19–35.
- Vasiljeva EV Principle of object - space of form. Maurice Marino / Fashion Theory: Clothing, Body, Culture. 2019. No. 4 (54). pp. 347–352..
- Vasiljeva E. Deconstruction and fashion: order and disorder / Theory of fashion: clothing, body, culture. 2018. No. 4, pp. 58–79.
- Vasiljeva E. Eugene Atget: artistic biography and mythological program / International Journal of Cultural Studies, No. 1 (30) 2018, p. 30 — 38.
- Vasiljeva E. V. Language, photo, sign. On the question of the semiotic status of the image and the object / Current problems of art theory and history: coll. scientific articles. Problem. 8. St. Petersburg: St. Petersburg State University Publishing House, 2018, pp. 567–574.
- Vasiljeva E. The phenomenon of fashion photography: rules of mythological systems / International Journal of Cultural Studies, No. 1 (26) 2017, p. 163-169.
- Vasiljeva E. The figure of the noble and the crisis of the ideology of the modern era / Theory of fashion: body, clothing, culture. 2018. No. 47. S. 10 - 29.
- Vasiljeva E. The ideology of the sign, the phenomenon of language and the "Mode System" / Theory of fashion: body, clothing, culture. 2017. No. 45. S.11 - 24.
- Vasiljeva E. Traditional system and principle of fashion / Theory of fashion: body, clothing, culture. 2017. No. 43, pp. 1–18.
- Vasiljeva E. Photography and illogical form. Taxonomic model and figure Others / Reserve. A debate on politics and culture. 2017, No. 1 (111). pp. 212–225.
- Vasiljeva E. Ideal and utilitarian in the system of international style: subject and object in the design concept of the 20th century. / International Journal of Cultural Studies. 2016. No. 4 (25). pp. 72–80.
- Vasiljeva E. Feminine phenomenon and sacred figure / Theory of fashion: body, clothing, culture. 2016. No. 42, pp. 160–189.
- Vasiljeva E. Düsseldorf school of photography: social and mythological / Bulletin of St. Petersburg University. Series 15. History of art. 2016. Edition. 3, pp. 27–37.
- Vasiljeva E. The idea of signs and the principle of exchange in the field of photography and the system of language / Bulletin of St. Petersburg University. Series 15. History of art. 2016 edition. 1, pp. 4–33.
- Vasilieva E. Musical form and photography: language system and meaning structure / Bulletin of St. Petersburg University. Series 15. History of art. 2015 edition. 4, pp. 28–41.
- Vasiljeva E. Photography and phenomenology of the tragic: the idea of propriety and the figure of responsibility / Bulletin of St. Petersburg University. Series 15. History of art. 2015 edition. 1, pp. 26–52.
- Vasiljeva E. Susan Sontagová on photography: the idea of beauty and the problem of norms / Bulletin of St. Petersburg University. Series 15. History of art. 2014 edition. 3, pp. 64–80.
- Vasiljeva E. Photography and the phenomenon of time / Bulletin of St. Petersburg University. Series 15. History of art. 2014 edition. 1, pp. 64–79.
- Vasiljeva E. Figure and mask in 19th century photography / Bulletin of St. Petersburg University. Series 15. History of art. 2012 edition. 4, pp. 175–186.

== See also ==
- Photography and Non-Logical Form
- Women photographers

== Further reading and reviews ==
- Bandorina K. Book by Ekaterina Vasilyeva “Fashion Theory: Myth, Consumption and Value System” // Terra artis, 2023, N 3.
- Pozdnyakova K.G. Theory of photography in 36 chapters. About Ekaterina Vasilyeva’s book “36 essays on photography” // Bulletin of Culture and Arts. 2023. No. 1 (73). pp. 96–101.
- Pozdnyakova K. G. Review of Ekaterina Vasilyeva's book “Fashion Theory: Myth, Consumerism and Value System” // Bulletin of Tomsk State University. Cultural studies and art history, 2023.
- Stepanov M.A. Image outside of Logos // International Journal of Cultural Research. 2019. No. 3. P. 231–235.
- “Photography and Non-Logical Form” by Ekaterina Vasilyeva - the Logic of Meaning // Review of the site photographer.ru, 2020.
