= On Photography =

1977 collection of essays by Susan Sontag

- Cover of the first edition
- Author: Susan Sontag
- Language: English
- Subject: Photography
- Genre: Criticism
- Publisher: Farrar, Straus and Giroux
- Publication date: 1977
- Publication place: United States
- Media type: Print (hardcover and paperback)
- Pages: 207
- ISBN: 0374226261

On Photography is a 1977 collection of essays by American writer Susan Sontag. The book originated from a series of essays Sontag published in The New York Review of Books between 1973 and 1977.

In On Photography, Sontag examines the history and contemporary role of photography in society. She contrasts the work of Diane Arbus with Depression-era documentary photography and explores the evolution of American photography from Walt Whitman's idealistic notions to the cynicism of the 1970s. Sontag argues that photography fosters a voyeuristic relationship with the world and can diminish the meaning of events. The book discusses the relationship between photography and politics and the tension between recording and intervention. On Photography received both acclaim and criticism, with some reviewers questioning its academic rigor.

== Contents ==
In the book, Sontag expresses her views on the history and present-day role of photography in societies as of the 1970s. Sontag discusses many examples of modern photography. Among these, she contrasts Diane Arbus's work with that of Depression-era documentary photography commissioned by the Farm Security Administration.

She also explores the history of American photography in relation to the idealistic notions of America put forth by Walt Whitman and traces these ideas through to the increasingly cynical aesthetic notions of the 1970s, particularly in relation to Arbus and Andy Warhol.

Sontag argues that the proliferation of photographic images had begun to establish within people a "chronic voyeuristic relation to the world." Among the consequences of this practice of photography is that the meaning of all events is leveled and made equal.

As she argues, perhaps originally with regard to photography, the medium fostered an attitude of anti-intervention. Sontag says that the individual who seeks to record cannot intervene, and that the person who intervenes cannot then faithfully record, for the two aims contradict each other. In this context, she discusses in some depth the relationship of photography to politics. One of the themes that is connected with the book is the problem of the norm and the repressive function of the idea of the norm in society.

== Reception ==
On Photography won the National Book Critics Circle Award for Criticism for 1977 and was selected among the top 20 books of 1977 by the editors of The New York Times Book Review. In 1977, William H. Gass, writing in The New York Times, said the book "shall surely stand near the beginning of all our thoughts upon the subject" of photography.

In a 1998 appraisal of the work, Michael Starenko, wrote in the magazine Afterimage: "On Photography has become so deeply absorbed into this discourse that Sontag's claims about photography, as well as her mode of argument, have become part of the rhetorical 'tool kit' that photography theorists and critics carry around in their heads". He added that "no other photography book, not even The Family of Man (1955), which sold four million copies before finally going out of print in 1978, received a wider range of press coverage than On Photography."

In 2003, Sontag published Regarding the Pain of Others, which reassesses some of the views she espoused in On Photography. Sontag considered that book to be a sequel to On Photography. Sontag's publishing history includes a similar sequence with regard to her 1978 book Illness as Metaphor and AIDS and Its Metaphors a decade later, which expands on some of the ideas contained in the earlier work.

== Editions ==
- New York: Farrar, Straus and Giroux, 1977. ISBN 9780374226268.
- London: Allan Lane, 1978. ISBN 9780713911282.
- New York: Anchor Books, 1990. ISBN 9780385267069.
- New York: Picador, 2001. ISBN 9780312420093.
- Reprinted in Sontag: Essays of the 1960s & 1970s, Library of America, 2013. ISBN 9781598532555. Includes endnotes.

Earlier versions of these essays appeared in The New York Review of Books:

- Volume 20, No. 16 (October 18, 1973): "Photography".
- Volume 20, No. 18 (November 15, 1973): "Freak Show".
- Volume 21, No. 6 (April 18, 1974): "Shooting America".
- Volume 21, No. 19 (November 28, 1974): "Photography: The Beauty Treatment".
- Volume 23, No. 21 & 22 (January 20, 1977): "Photography in Search of Itself".
- Volume 24, No. 11 (June 23, 1977): "Photography Unlimited".

== See also ==
- Regarding the Pain of Others
- Camera Lucida
- Photography and Non-Logical Form
