= Art for art =

Contemporary art movement

Art for art is an international contemporary art movement. Akin to the 19th-century slogan Art for art's sake, or "l'art pour l'art", the work of art is seen as a self-sufficient product independent from the personality of its creator.

== Categorization ==
Art for Art is a movement in visual contemporary art, represented by a group of American, European, and Chinese artists. They work in various styles and techniques, but hold to the same ideology, supporting the idea of the value and significance of the piece of art as an act of creation and self-expression. This movement denies the social influence of the artist's name on the artwork's true value, but relies on the principle of anonymity in art, hence the name of the movement "Art for Art" that underlines the elimination of the artist from the work. The term 'Art for Art' is also associated with the deliberate abandonment of the art elitism and returning to its initial decorative and aesthetic functions. Such artists usually hide their real identities under monikers and thus conceal the personal data that can influence the judgement of their works.

Artists that belong to the Art for Art movement are Harry Carlson, John Atwood, Bertha Delisi, Alice Zimmermann, Patrick Duchamp, Max Rey, Jing Wu, Otto Wagner, Ursula Larsen, Sofia Rossi, and Sofia Delano.

The term 'Art for Art,' inspired by the 19th-century movement Art for art's sake, was chosen by the founding group of artists and first officially used in 2016 as the name of their inaugural Art Exhibition in Monaco and organized by Franck Monsonego who used all his long experience for the launch of this new artistic project, although this direction, as an association of independent artists, had existed for some time.

A 2018 exhibition in Moscow received significant media attention.

== Exhibitions ==
- Monaco, 2016
- Brussels, BFAF, 2017
- Luxembourg, ART3F, 2017.
- Moscow, RA&AF, 2018
