= Photography and Non-Logical Form =

Book and research concept by art critic and historian Ekaterina Vasilyeva

- Book cover
- Author: Ekaterina Vasileva
- Language: Russian
- Genre: Non-fiction, art history
- Publication place: Russia

Photography and Non-Logical Form is a book and research concept by art critic and art historian Ekaterina Vasilyeva. The book provides an idea that draws attention to the irrational basis of photography. The study considers photography as a tool that reveals the irrational and archaic principle of thinking. Considered one of the formative books in the field of photography theory. The book is created as a collection of essays published in the 2010s in academic sources. The texts touch on aspects of a single topic and raise the general problem of the phenomenon of the non-logical in photography. It was published as a separate book by New Literary Review in 2019.

== General aspects ==
The study considers photography as a phenomenon in which not only the visual but also the semantic component is important. The basis of the concept is the representation of photography as an irrational system that uses a non-logical form as a main mechanism. The concept of the book synthesizes the theory of photography and the theory of thinking, considering the rational and non-logical as a single mechanism. In photography, the non-logical form can be considered as part of the civilizational consciousness. The photographic system reveals that forms of thought traditionally defined as archaic are an integral component of modern consciousness.

== Photography and the non-logical: general principles ==
The modern analytical system considers logical thinking to be its basis: rational knowledge is built on its principles. The concept of a non-logical system connects the photography with the space of the irrational. Photography, like many other civilizational forms, retains elements of prelogical consciousness. This concept was partly presented in the works of Roland Barthes, Jean Baudrillard, Rosalind Krauss and subsequently formulated in the book Photography and Non-Logical Form. The concept is based on the study of the principles of non-logical consciousness, initiated by Ernst Cassirer, Lucien Lévy-Bruhl and Claude Lévi-Strauss. Ekaterina Vasilyeva's research deals with the ability of photography to support a non-logical system. Photography violates the principle of language and meaning, changes the usual continuity of time, otherwise defines the system and structure of space.

== The idea of a sign and the system of language ==
The book draws attention to the fact that photography noticeably violates the principle of language. Photography cannot reproduce the linguistic principle of the exchange between the signifier and the signified and draws attention to itself as a phenomenon that specifically forms the structure of meaning. This observation was also expressed by other researchers in their studies. Ekaterina Vasilyeva draws attention to the fact that photography cannot act as a sign and cannot use the system of meaning formation inherent in language. Photography demonstrates the principle of meaning formation, independent of the sign. The book emphasizes that the phenomenon of photographic meaning is characterized by semantic uncertainty. The photograph demonstrates the possibility of a principle unrelated to the monetary or linguistic system. Along with other researchers, the author comes to the conclusion that photography does not support the language system.

== Photography and the categorical structure of thinking ==
Photography breaks the standard taxonomic model and overcomes the system of categorical thinking. Categories, generalizations and concepts in photography are replaced by literal images. In a photograph, a general representation of the subject is impossible. The frame allows a specific image of a given subject. In photography, the principle of system and structure is replaced by the idea of a literal list. This brings photography closer to both archaic thinking and modern principles of object consciousness.

== Photography and taxonomic model ==
Photography violates the principles of classification adopted in the civilizational system and subject to categorical or hierarchical thinking. The photographic representation does not support the root taxon system and the underlying classified entities. Civilizational thinking is a hierarchy of subordinate concepts. Photography operates on principles that are not linked by circumstances of subordination. Photography forms a fundamentally different model: it does not use general or generalizing concepts, but is a literal list of specific, often secondary, objects. This literal listing (or representation) of specific objects cannot be used as an element of subordinate categories. Researchers pay attention to the fact that the principle of generalization, on which the taxonomic system is built, is not possible in photography. Photography is addressed to specific subjects, and not to their generalization and systematization. “Classification is ... the separation of the main and the secondary. The taxonomic model presupposes an order of precedence, a hierarchy of the important and the insignificant, the main and the peripheral.” Researchers point out that photography, in fact, does not allow for the possibility of such a division.

== Photo and time category ==
Photography is often considered one of those phenomena that reveals a specific position in the system of time. Photography does not refute the pattern of linear time, but it does not support it either. Photography is characterized by inconsistency with the system of time, tied to the continuity of past, present and future. “The photograph sees the time flow as a set of isolated “nows” that violate the idea of linearity and build a chaotic environment,” notes photography researcher Ekaterina Vasilieva. Photography radically mixes the emphasis between past, present and future: frames as events can be arranged in any sequence. At the same time, photography always belongs to the present and, at the same time, is always connected with the past. .

== Photography and the problem of depicting space ==
The study is based on the assumption that photography uses a specific model of space. Its peculiarity lies not only in the ability to convert a three-dimensional volume into a two-dimensional image, but also in the ability to represent space as a specific structure. Photography does not reproduce space as a single organism, but considers it as a set of fragments. Photography presents the elements of space as qualitatively different, destroying the idea of the world as a single system. This way of representing space can be considered typical for archaic systems and mythological consciousness. “Photography captures the surrounding space as a set of fragments.” The author of the book notes that pictorial space refers to the idea of the whole. Other authors have made similar observations. “Photography opens up space as a form of optical illusion, moving ever further away from the idea associated with the wall of the picture.” The photographic system faces the same system as the mythological space: its parts are fragmentary and are not connected with each other either meaningfully or logically. Photography divides physical space into fragments and constructs a new spatial environment on their basis. The effect of “metaphysical emptiness” has acquired particular significance in photography. An example of a metaphysical representation of space is the photographs of Eugène Atget.

== Photography and the problem of presence ==
The photograph presents a specific paradox in terms of the circumstance of presence. The author of the book draws attention to the fact that when talking about photography, we do not always understand what means “to be”, and what “not to be” means. In particular, Martin Heidegger spoke about the possibility of defining being by time, and time by being. When the components of this connection are broken, the idea of presence and existence in photography appears as a paradox. Photography, which initially violates the picture of time, demonstrates a paradoxical situation in terms of the picture of presence. If the picture of time is broken in a photograph, it is difficult to determine what “to be” means in relation to the frame. The study defines the specifics of photography as a violation of the unity of being and time.

== Criticism ==
Critics evaluate the book as an important precedent in the field of photography theory. They characterize the book as a study in an attempt to consider photography as part of an irrational system in today's culture. The researchers believe that the book is "one of the few attempts in recent years to move away from traditional research patterns that have developed in the field of photography." Critics believe that the study forms its own analytical program and forms a new analytical vector in the study of photography.

Critics note the importance of the concept for the study of modern culture in general. “Vasilyeva’s research shows the presence in a number of media phenomena of modern culture of elements that have their own activity and logic, beyond the control of human rationality.”

== Libraries ==
The book Photography and Non-Logical Form is presented in the collections of the following libraries:

- Library of Congress, Washington, D.C., US
- Warburg Library, London, UK
- Library of the Cini Foundation, Venice, Italy
- National Library of Finland, Helsinki, Finland
- Russian State Library, Moscow, Russia
- The National Library of Russia, Saint Petersburg, Russia
- Library of the Russian State University for the Humanities, Moscow, Russia
- Library of Saint Petersburg State University, Saint Petersburg, Russia

== First edition ==
- Vasileva E. (2019) Photography and Non-Logical Form. M.: New Literary Review, 312 p.

== See also ==
- Roland Barthes
- Susan Sontag
- Ekaterina Vasileva (art historian)
- On Photography
- Camera Lucida
