= Roland Barthes =

French philosopher and essayist (1915–1980)

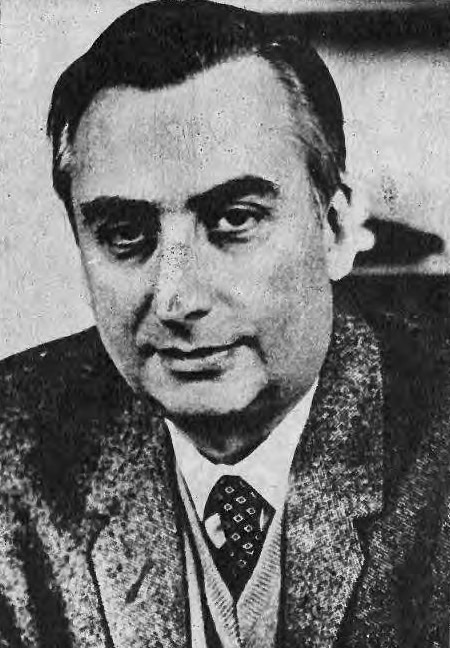
- Born: Roland Gérard Barthes; 12 November 1915; Cherbourg, France
- Died: 26 March 1980 (aged 64); Paris, France

Education
- Education: University of Paris (BA, MA)
- Academic advisor: Paul Mazon

Philosophical work
- Era: 20th-century philosophy
- Region: Western philosophy
- School: Continental philosophy Structuralism; Semiotics; Post-structuralism
- Institutions: University of Paris VIII; École des Hautes Études en Sciences Sociales (the VIe section of the EPHE until 1975); Collège de France
- Doctoral students: Sylvère Lotringer; Tzvetan Todorov
- Notable students: Jacques-Alain Miller; Julia Kristeva; Benoît Peeters
- Main interests: Semiotics (literary semiotics, semiotics of photography, comics semiotics, literary theory), narratology, linguistics
- Notable works: Writing Degree Zero (1953); Mythologies (1957) "The Death of the Author" (1967)
- Notable ideas: Effect of reality Structural analysis of narratives Texte lisible vs texte scriptible

Roland Gérard Barthes (/bɑːrt/; French: [ʁɔlɑ̃ baʁt]; 12 November 1915 – 26 March 1980) was a French literary theorist, essayist, philosopher, critic, and semiotician. His work engaged in the analysis of a variety of sign systems, mainly derived from Western popular culture. His ideas explored a diverse range of fields, including structuralism, anthropology, literary theory, and post-structuralism, and influenced the development of multiple schools of theory.

Barthes is particularly notable for his 1957 essay collection Mythologies, which contained reflections on popular culture, and the 1967/1968 essay "The Death of the Author", which critiqued traditional approaches in literary criticism. During his academic career he was primarily associated with the École des Hautes Études en Sciences Sociales (EHESS) and the Collège de France.

== Biography ==
=== Early life ===
Roland Barthes was born on 12 November 1915 in the town of Cherbourg in Normandy. His father, naval officer Louis Barthes, was killed in a battle during World War I in the North Sea before Barthes's first birthday. His mother, Henriette Barthes, and his aunt and grandmother raised him in the village of Urt and the city of Bayonne. In 1924, Barthes's family moved to Paris, though his attachment to his provincial roots would remain strong throughout his life.

=== Student years ===
Barthes spent 1935 to 1939 at the University of Paris (Sorbonne), where he earned a licence in classical literature. He was plagued by ill health throughout this period, suffering from tuberculosis, which often had to be treated in the isolation of sanatoria. His repeated physical breakdowns disrupted his academic career, affecting his studies and his ability to take qualifying examinations. They also exempted him from military service during World War II.

His life from 1939 to 1948 was largely spent obtaining a licence in grammar and philology, publishing his first papers, taking part in a medical study, and continuing to struggle with his health. He received a DES (diplôme d'études supérieures, roughly equivalent to an MA) from the University of Paris in 1941 for his work on Greek tragedy under the direction of Paul Mazon.

=== Early academic career ===
In 1948, he returned to purely academic work, gaining multiple short-term positions at institutes in France, Romania, and Egypt. During this time, he contributed to the leftist Parisian paper Combat, out of which grew his first full-length work, Writing Degree Zero (1953).

In 1952, Barthes settled at the Centre National de la Recherche Scientifique, where he studied lexicology and sociology. During his seven-year period there, he began to write a popular series of bi-monthly essays for the magazine Les Lettres Nouvelles, in which he dismantled myths of popular culture (gathered in the Mythologies collection that was published in 1957). Consisting of fifty-four short essays, mostly written between 1954 and 1956, Mythologies were acute reflections of French popular culture ranging from an analysis on soap detergents to a dissection of professional wrestling. Knowing little English, Barthes taught at Middlebury College in 1957 and befriended the future English translator of much of his work, Richard Howard, that summer in New York City.

=== Rise to prominence ===
Barthes spent the early 1960s exploring the fields of semiology and structuralism, chairing various faculty positions around France, and continuing to produce more full-length studies. His works challenged traditional academic views of literary criticism and of renowned figures of literature. His unorthodox thinking led to a conflict with a well-known Sorbonne professor of literature, Raymond Picard, who attacked the French New Criticism (a label that he inaccurately applied to Barthes) for its obscurity and lack of respect towards France's literary roots. Barthes's rebuttal in Criticism and Truth (1966) accused the old, bourgeois criticism of a lack of concern with the finer points of language and of selective ignorance towards challenging theories, such as Marxism.

By the late 1960s, Barthes had established a reputation for himself. He traveled to the US and Japan, delivering a presentation at Johns Hopkins University. During this time, he wrote a groundbreaking text, the 1967 essay "The Death of the Author" which, in light of the growing influence of Jacques Derrida's deconstruction, would prove to be a transitional piece in its investigation of the logical ends of structuralist thought.

=== Mature critical work ===
Barthes continued to contribute with Philippe Sollers to the avant-garde literary magazine Tel Quel, which was developing similar kinds of theoretical inquiry to that pursued in Barthes's writings. In 1970, Barthes produced what some consider to be his most ambitious and sustained structural analysis, the dense, critical reading of Balzac's Sarrasine entitled S/Z. Throughout the 1970s, Barthes continued to develop his literary criticism; he developed new ideals of textuality and novelistic neutrality. In 1971, he served as visiting professor at the University of Geneva. In those same years he became primarily associated with the École des Hautes Études en Sciences Sociales (EHESS).

In 1975 he wrote an autobiography titled Roland Barthes and in 1977 he was elected to the chair of Sémiologie Littéraire at the Collège de France. In the same year, his mother, Henriette Barthes, to whom he had been devoted, died, aged 85. They had lived together for 60 years. The loss of the woman who had raised and cared for him was a serious blow to Barthes. His last major work, Camera Lucida, is partly an essay about the nature of photography and partly a meditation on photographs of his mother. The book contains a number of reproductions of photographs, though none of them is of Henriette.

Barthes had a small role in the 1979 French film The Brontë Sisters, playing William Makepeace Thackeray.

== Death ==
On 25 February 1980, having just finished lunch with (future President) François Mitterrand, Barthes was struck by a laundry van as he stepped off a Paris sidewalk on Rue des Écoles, opposite of the Collège de France. One month later, on 26 March, he died of pulmonary complications resulting from the traffic accident.

== Writings and ideas ==
=== Early thought ===
Barthes's earliest ideas reacted to the trend of existentialist philosophy that was prominent in France during the 1940s, specifically to the figurehead of existentialism, Jean-Paul Sartre. Sartre's What Is Literature? (1947) expresses a disenchantment both with established forms of writing and more experimental, avant-garde forms, which he feels alienate readers. Barthes's response was to try to discover that which may be considered unique and original in writing. In Writing Degree Zero (1953), Barthes argues that conventions inform both language and style, rendering neither purely creative. Instead, form, or what Barthes calls "writing" (the specific way an individual chooses to manipulate conventions of style for a desired effect), is the unique and creative act. However, a writer's form is vulnerable to becoming a convention once it has been made available to the public. This means that creativity is an ongoing process of continual change and reaction.

In Michelet, a critical analysis of the French historian Jules Michelet, Barthes developed these notions, applying them to a broader range of fields. He argued that Michelet's views of history and society are obviously flawed. In studying his writings, he continued, one should not seek to learn from Michelet's claims; rather, one should maintain a critical distance and learn from his errors, since understanding how and why his thinking is flawed will show more about his period of history than his own observations. Similarly, Barthes felt that avant-garde writing should be praised for its maintenance of just such a distance between its audience and itself. In presenting an obvious artificiality rather than making claims to great subjective truths, Barthes argued, avant-garde writers ensure that their audiences maintain an objective perspective. In this sense, Barthes believed that art should be critical and should interrogate the world, rather than seek to explain it, as Michelet had done.

=== Semiotics and myth ===
Barthes's many monthly contributions, collected in his Mythologies (1957), frequently interrogated specific cultural materials in order to expose how bourgeois society asserted its values through them. For example, Barthes cited the portrayal of wine in French society. Its description as a robust and healthy habit is a bourgeois ideal that is contradicted by certain realities (i.e., that wine can be unhealthy and inebriating). He found semiotics, the study of signs, useful in these interrogations. He developed a theory of signs to demonstrate this perceived deception. He suggested that the construction of myths results in two levels of signification: the "language-object", a first order linguistic system; and the "metalanguage", the second-order system transmitting the myth. The former pertains to the literal or explicit meaning of things while the latter is composed of the language used to speak about the first order.

Barthes explained that these bourgeois cultural myths were "second-order signs," or "connotations." A picture of a full, dark bottle is a signifier that relates to a specific "signified": a fermented, alcoholic beverage. However, the bourgeoisie relate it to a new signified: the idea of healthy, robust, relaxing experience. Motivations for such manipulations vary, from a desire to sell products to a simple desire to maintain the status quo. These insights brought Barthes in line with similar Marxist theory. Barthes used the term "myth" while analyzing the popular, consumer culture of post-war France in order to reveal that "objects were organized into meaningful relationships via narratives that expressed collective cultural values."

Mythologies is a seminal work that consists of a collection of essays originally published as magazine articles, in which he examines elements of French popular culture through the lens of semiotics. In this work, Barthes argues that cultural signs are not neutral but are deeply embedded in ideological structures that reinforce dominant social values. Drawing on concepts associated with Western Marxist thought—such as ideology, authenticity, and commodity fetishism—Barthes decodes everyday phenomena like the Citroën car, professional wrestling, magazine covers, and children’s toys. For example, he interprets the Citroën as a modern cathedral symbolizing the fetishization of consumer goods, and a magazine cover featuring a Black soldier saluting the French flag as a subtle reinforcement of colonial ideology. Through such analyses, Barthes illustrates how ordinary cultural products function as tools of ideological reproduction in modern society.

=== Structuralism and its limits ===
As Barthes's work with structuralism began to flourish around the time of his debates with Picard, his investigation of structure focused on revealing the importance of language in writing, which he felt was overlooked by old criticism. Barthes's "Introduction to the Structural Analysis of Narrative" is concerned with examining the correspondence between the structure of a sentence and that of a larger narrative, thus allowing narrative to be viewed along linguistic lines. Barthes split this work into three hierarchical levels: 'functions', 'actions' and 'narrative'. 'Functions' are the elementary pieces of a work, such as a single descriptive word that can be used to identify a character. That character would be an 'action', and consequently one of the elements that make up the narrative. Barthes was able to use these distinctions to evaluate how certain key 'functions' work in forming characters. For example, key words like 'dark', 'mysterious' and 'odd', when integrated together, formulate a specific kind of character or 'action'. By breaking down the work into such fundamental distinctions Barthes was able to judge the degree of realism given functions have in forming their actions and consequently with what authenticity a narrative can be said to reflect on reality. Thus, his structuralist theorizing became another exercise in his ongoing attempts to dissect and expose the misleading mechanisms of bourgeois culture.

=== Transition ===
Such thought led Barthes to consider the limitations not just of signs and symbols, but also of Western culture's dependency on beliefs of constancy and ultimate standards. He travelled to Japan in 1966 where he wrote Empire of Signs (published in 1970), a meditation on Japanese culture's contentment in the absence of a search for a transcendental signifier. He notes that in Japan there is no emphasis on a great focus point by which to judge all other standards, describing the centre of Tokyo, the Emperor's Palace, as not a great overbearing entity, but a silent and nondescript presence, avoided and unconsidered. As such, Barthes reflects on the ability of signs in Japan to exist for their own merit, retaining only the significance naturally imbued by their signifiers. Such a society contrasts greatly to the one he dissected in Mythologies, which was revealed to be always asserting a greater, more complex significance on top of the natural one.

In the wake of this trip Barthes wrote what is largely considered to be his best-known work, the essay "The Death of the Author" (1967). Barthes saw the notion of the author, or authorial authority, in the criticism of literary text as the forced projection of an ultimate meaning of the text. By imagining an ultimate intended meaning of a piece of literature one could infer an ultimate explanation for it. But Barthes points out that the great proliferation of meaning in language and the unknowable state of the author's mind makes any such ultimate realization impossible. As such, the whole notion of the 'knowable text' acts as little more than another delusion of Western bourgeois culture. Indeed, the idea of giving a book or poem an ultimate end coincides with the notion of making it consumable, something that can be used up and replaced in a capitalist market. "The Death of the Author" is considered to be a post-structuralist work.

=== Textuality and S/Z ===
Since Barthes contends that there can be no originating anchor of meaning in the possible intentions of the author, he considers what other sources of meaning or significance can be found in literature. He concludes that since meaning can't come from the author, it must be actively created by the reader through a process of textual analysis. In his S/Z (1970), Barthes applies this notion in an analysis of Sarrasine, a Balzac novella. The result was a reading that established five major codes for determining various kinds of significance, with numerous lexias throughout the text – a "lexia" here being defined as a unit of the text chosen arbitrarily (to remain methodologically unbiased as possible) for further analysis.

=== Neutral and novelistic writing ===
In the late 1970s, Barthes was increasingly concerned with the conflict of two types of language: that of popular culture, which he saw as limiting and pigeonholing in its titles and descriptions, and neutral, which he saw as open and noncommittal. He called these two conflicting modes the Doxa (the official and unacknowledged systems of meaning through which culture is absorbed)) and the Para-doxa. While Barthes had sympathized with Marxist thought in the past (or at least parallel criticisms), he felt that, despite its anti-ideological stance, Marxist theory was just as guilty of using violent language with assertive meanings, as was bourgeois literature. In this way they were both Doxa and both culturally assimilating. As a reaction to this, he wrote The Pleasure of the Text (1975), a study that focused on a subject matter he felt was equally outside the realm of both conservative society and militant leftist thinking: hedonism. By writing about a subject that was rejected by both social extremes of thought, Barthes felt he could avoid the dangers of the limiting language of the Doxa. The theory he developed out of this focus claimed that, while reading for pleasure is a kind of social act, through which the reader exposes him/herself to the ideas of the writer, the final cathartic climax of this pleasurable reading, which he termed the bliss in reading or jouissance, is a point in which one becomes lost within the text. This loss of self within the text or immersion in the text, signifies a final impact of reading that is experienced outside the social realm and free from the influence of culturally associative language and is thus neutral with regard to social progress.

Despite this newest theory of reading, Barthes remained concerned with the difficulty of achieving truly neutral writing, which required an avoidance of any labels that might carry an implied meaning or identity towards a given object. Even carefully crafted neutral writing could be taken in an assertive context through the incidental use of a word with a loaded social context. Barthes felt his past works, like Mythologies, had suffered from this. He became interested in finding the best method for creating neutral writing, and he decided to try to create a novelistic form of rhetoric that would not seek to impose its meaning on the reader. One product of this endeavor was A Lover's Discourse: Fragments in 1977, in which he presents the fictionalized reflections of a lover seeking to identify and be identified by an anonymous amorous other. The unrequited lover's search for signs by which to show and receive love makes evident illusory myths involved in such a pursuit. The lover's attempts to assert himself into a false, ideal reality is involved in a delusion that exposes the contradictory logic inherent in such a search. Yet at the same time the novelistic character is a sympathetic one, and is thus open not just to criticism but also understanding from the reader. The result is one that challenges the reader's views of social constructs of love, without trying to assert any definitive theory of meaning.

=== Mind and body ===
Barthes also attempted to reinterpret the mind–body dualism theory. Like Friedrich Nietzsche and Emmanuel Levinas, he also drew from Eastern philosophical traditions in his critique of European culture as "infected" by Western metaphysics. His body theory emphasized the formation of the self through bodily cultivation. The theory, which is also described as ethico-political entity, considers the idea of the body as one that functions as a "fashion word" that provides the illusion of a grounded discourse. This theory has influenced the work of other thinkers such as Jerome Bel.

=== Photography and Henriette Barthes ===
Throughout his career, Barthes had an interest in photography and its potential to communicate actual events. A number of his monthly myth articles in the 1950s had attempted to show how a photographic image could represent implied meanings and thus be used by bourgeois culture to infer 'naturalistic truths'. But he still considered the photograph to have a unique potential for presenting a completely real representation of the world. When his mother, Henriette Barthes, died in 1977 he began writing Camera Lucida as an attempt to explain the unique significance a picture of her as a child carried for him.

Reflecting on the relationship between the obvious symbolic meaning of a photograph (which he called the studium) and that which is purely personal and dependent on the individual, that which 'pierces the viewer' (which he called the punctum).

=== Posthumous publications ===
A posthumous collection of essays was published in 1987 by François Wahl, Incidents. It contains fragments from his journals: his Soirées de Paris (a 1979 extract from his erotic diary of life in Paris); an earlier diary he kept which explicitly detailed his paying for sex with men and boys in Morocco; and Light of the Sud Ouest (his childhood memories of rural French life). In November 2007, Yale University Press published a new translation into English (by Richard Howard) of Barthes's little known work What is Sport. This work bears a considerable resemblance to Mythologies and was originally commissioned by the Canadian Broadcasting Corporation as the text for a documentary film directed by Hubert Aquin.

In February 2009, Éditions du Seuil published Journal de deuil (Journal of Mourning), based on Barthes's files written from 26 November 1977 (the day following his mother's death) up to 15 September 1979, intimate notes on his terrible loss:

The (awesome but not painful) idea that she had not been everything to me. Otherwise I would never have written a work. Since my taking care of her for six months long, she actually had become everything for me, and I totally forgot of ever have written anything at all. I was nothing more than hopelessly hers. Before that she had made herself transparent so that I could write.... Mixing-up of roles. For months long I had been her mother. I felt like I had lost a daughter.

He grieved his mother's death for the rest of his life: "Do not say mourning. It's too psychoanalytic. I'm not in mourning. I'm suffering." and "In the corner of my room where she had been bedridden, where she had died and where I now sleep, in the wall where her headboard had stood against I hung an icon—not out of faith. And I always put some flowers on a table. I do not wish to travel anymore so that I may stay here and prevent the flowers from withering away."

In 2012 the book Travels in China was published. It consists of his notes from a three-week trip to China he undertook with a group from the literary journal Tel Quel in 1974. The experience left him somewhat disappointed, as he found China "not at all exotic, not at all disorienting".

== Key terms ==
Readerly and writerly are terms Barthes employs both to delineate one type of literature from another and to implicitly interrogate ways of reading, like positive or negative habits the modern reader brings into one's experience with the text itself. These terms are most explicitly fleshed out in S/Z, while the essay "From Work to Text", from Image—Music—Text (1977), provides an analogous parallel look at the active–passive and postmodern–modern ways of interacting with a text.

=== The Author and the scriptor ===
Author and scriptor are terms Barthes uses to describe different ways of thinking about the creators of texts. "The author" is the traditional concept of the lone genius creating a work of literature or other piece of writing by the powers of his/her original imagination. For Barthes, such a figure is no longer viable. The insights offered by an array of modern thought, including the insights of Surrealism, have rendered the term obsolete. In place of the author, the modern world offers a figure Barthes calls the "scriptor," whose only power is to combine pre-existing texts in new ways. Barthes believes that all writing draws on previous texts, norms, and conventions, and that these are the things to which the reader must turn to understand a text.

As a way of asserting the relative unimportance of the writer's biography compared to these textual and generic conventions, Barthes says that the scriptor has no past, but is born with the text. He also argues that, in the absence of the idea of an "author-God" to control the meaning of a work, interpretive horizons are opened up considerably for the active reader. As Barthes puts it, "the death of the author is the birth of the reader."

== Criticism ==
In 1964, Barthes wrote "The Last Happy Writer" ("Le dernier des écrivains heureux" in Essais critiques), the title of which refers to Voltaire. In the essay he commented on the problems of the modern thinker after discovering the relativism in thought and philosophy, discrediting previous philosophers who avoided this difficulty. Disagreeing roundly with Barthes's description of Voltaire, Daniel Gordon, the translator and editor of Candide (The Bedford Series in History and Culture), wrote that "never has one brilliant writer so thoroughly misunderstood another."

The sinologist Simon Leys, in a review of Barthes's diary of a trip to China during the Cultural Revolution, disparages Barthes for his seeming indifference to the situation of the Chinese people, and says that Barthes "has contrived—amazingly—to bestow an entirely new dignity upon the age-old activity, so long unjustly disparaged, of saying nothing at great length."

== In popular culture ==
Barthes's A Lover's Discourse: Fragments was the inspiration for the name of 1980s new wave duo The Lover Speaks.

Jeffrey Eugenides's The Marriage Plot draws out excerpts from Barthes's A Lover's Discourse: Fragments as a way to depict the unique intricacies of love that one of the main characters, Madeleine Hanna, experiences throughout the novel.

In the film Birdman (2014) by Alejandro González Iñárritu, a journalist quotes to the protagonist Riggan Thompson an extract from Mythologies: "The cultural work done in the past by gods and epic sagas is now done by laundry-detergent commercials and comic-strip characters".

In the film The Truth About Cats & Dogs (1996) by Michael Lehmann, Brian is reading an extract from Camera Lucida over the phone to someone he thinks to be a beautiful woman but is actually her more intellectual and less physically desirable friend.

In the film Elegy, based on Philip Roth's novel The Dying Animal, the character of Consuela (played by Penélope Cruz) is first depicted in the film carrying a copy of Barthes's The Pleasure of the Text on the campus of the university where she is a student.

Laurent Binet's novel The 7th Function of Language is based on the premise that Barthes was not merely accidentally hit by a van driver but that he was instead murdered, as part of a conspiracy to acquire a document known as the "Seventh Function of Language".

== Bibliography ==
=== Original French ===
- (1953) Le degré zéro de l'écriture
- (1954) Michelet par lui-même
- (1957) Mythologies, Seuil: Paris.
- (1963) Sur Racine, Editions du Seuil: Paris
- (1964) Éléments de sémiologie, Communications 4, Seuil: Paris.
- (1970) L'Empire des signes, Skira: Geneve.
- (1970) S/Z, Seuil: Paris.
- (1971) Sade, Fourier, Loyola, Editions du Seuil: Paris.
- (1972) Le Degré zéro de l'écriture suivi de Nouveaux essais critiques, Editions du Seuil: Paris.
- (1973) Le plaisir du texte, Editions du Seuil: Paris.
- (1975) Roland Barthes, Éditions du Seuil: Paris
- (1977) Poétique du récit, Editions du Seuil: Paris.
- (1977) Fragments d'un discours amoureux, Paris
- (1978) Préface, La Parole Intermédiaire, F. Flahault, Seuil: Paris
- (1980) Recherche de Proust, Editions du Seuil: Paris.
- (1980) La chambre claire: note sur la photographie. [Paris]: Cahiers du cinéma: Gallimard: Le Seuil, 1980.
- (1981) Essais critiques, Editions du Seuil: Paris.
- (1982) Littérature et réalité, Editions du Seuil: Paris.
- (1988) Michelet, Editions du Seuil: Paris.
- (1993) Œuvres complètes, Editions du Seuil: Paris.
- (2009) Carnets du voyage en Chine, Christian Bourgeois: Paris.
- (2009) Journal de deuil, Editions du Seuil/IMEC: Paris.

=== Translations to English ===
- The Fashion System (1967), University of California Press: Berkeley.
- Writing Degree Zero (1968), Hill and Wang: New York. ISBN 0-374-52139-5
- Elements of Semiology (1968), Hill and Wang: New York.
- Mythologies (1972), Hill and Wang: New York.
- The Pleasure of the Text (1973), Hill and Wang: New York.
- S/Z: An Essay (1975), Hill and Wang: New York. ISBN 0-374-52167-0
- Sade, Fourier, Loyola (1976), Farrar, Straus and Giroux: New York.
- Image—Music—Text (1977), Hill and Wang: New York.
- Roland Barthes by Roland Barthes (1977)
- The Eiffel Tower and other Mythologies (1979), University of California Press: Berkeley.
- Camera Lucida: Reflections on Photography (1981), Hill and Wang: New York.
- Critical Essays (1972), Northwestern University Press
- A Barthes Reader (1982), Hill and Wang: New York.
- Empire of Signs (1983), Hill and Wang: New York.
- The Grain of the Voice: Interviews 1962–1980 (1985), Jonathan Cape: London.
- The Responsibility of Forms: Critical Essays on Music, Art, and Representation (1985), Basil Blackwell: Oxford.
- The Rustle of Language (1986), B. Blackwell: Oxford.
- Criticism and Truth (1987), The Athlone Pr.: London.
- Michelet (1987), B.Blackwell: Oxford.
- Writer Sollers (1987), University of Minnesota Press: Minneapolis.
- Roland Barthes (1988), Macmillan Pr.: London.
- A Lover's Discourse: Fragments (1990), Penguin Books: London.
- New Critical Essays (1990), University of California Press: Berkeley.
- Incidents (1992), University of California Press: Berkeley.
- On Racine (1992), University of California Press: Berkeley
- The Semiotic Challenge (1994), University of California Press: Berkeley.
- The Neutral: Lecture Course at the Collège de France (1977–1978) (2005), Columbia University Press: New York.
- The Language of Fashion (2006), Power Publications: Sydney.
- What Is Sport? (2007), Yale University Press: London and New Haven. ISBN 978-0-300-11604-5
- Mourning Diary (2010), Hill and Wang: New York. ISBN 978-0-8090-6233-1
- The Preparation of the Novel: Lecture Courses and Seminars at the Collège de France (1978–1979 and 1979–1980) (2011), Columbia University Press: New York.
- How to Live Together: Notes for a Lecture Course and Seminar at the Collège de France (1976–1977) (2013), Columbia University Press: New York.
