= S/Z =

Book by Roland Barthes

- Cover of the first edition
- Author: Roland Barthes
- Original title: S/Z
- Language: French
- Subject: "Sarrasine"
- Publication date: 1970
- Publication place: France
- Media type: Print (hardcover and paperback)
- ISBN: 978-0374521677
- OCLC: 10314663

S/Z, published in 1970, is Roland Barthes' structural analysis of "Sarrasine", the short story by Honoré de Balzac. Barthes methodically moves through the text of the story, denoting where and how different codes of meaning function. Barthes' study had a major impact on literary criticism and is historically located at the crossroads of structuralism and post-structuralism.

== Relation to structuralism ==
Barthes's analysis is influenced by the structuralist linguistics of Ferdinand de Saussure; both Barthes and Saussure aim to explore and demystify the link between a sign and its meaning. However, Barthes moves beyond structuralism, criticizing narratology's tendency to establish the overall system out of which all individual narratives are created, a practice that makes the text lose its specificity (différance) (I).

Barthes employs five specific "codes" that thematically, semiotically/semiologically, and otherwise make a literary text reflect structures that are interwoven, but not in a definite way that closes the meaning of the text (XII). Barthes insists on the (different degrees of) plurality of a text — a plurality that should not be reduced by any privileged interpretation. He also flags the way in which the reader is an active producer of interpretations of the text, rather than a passive consumer. (II).

== Codes ==
Barthes proposes five codes that, together, define a network (or a topos) and form a conceptual space through which the text runs. These codes and their mutual relations are not restrictive structures, and so do not fully specify how the text is to be understood or interpreted (i.e., do not "close" the text); thus, Barthes defines the codes vaguely: each of the textual units marks a virtual digression toward a catalogue of other units, and each code also appears as a "voice" such that, together, they "weave" the text—though each of them may, singly, dominate the text for a while (XII).

Two of the codes are sequential, and structure the text in an irreversible way (XV): the hermeneutic code concerns enigmas that, simultaneously, move the narrative forward, and yet provide for delays and obstacles which maintain suspense; the proairetic code organises (small) intertwined sequences of behaviors, with each sequence possessing its own regularity that does not (necessarily) follow the narrative's logic, though it is used in it. (XI)

The remaining three codes are reversible (XV). Two of them structure the text, viz. the semantic and symbolic codes. The former—semantic—code denotes signifiers of a special kind (e.g. person, place, object), to which adhere unstable meanings and by which are enabled the development of a theme throughout the story (XI, LXXXI). The symbolic code, similarly, also comprises connotative meanings (e.g. those stemming from rhetoric or sexuality); but these tend to provide—versus those of semantic code—a "deeper" or larger interpretive framework, and more often involve oppositions between binaries, or associations the text can only represent via metonymies; and so, thereby, is the text rendered yet further open to interpretation (XI, XCII).

The last, cultural code refers to meanings external to the text, e.g. in science or traditional wisdom (sagesse) (XI).

Barthes does not provide an overall structure for how the codes are to be integrated, as he wishes to preserve the plurality (or "multivalence") of the text: since reading is plural (IX), a different reading (reader) might invoke and/or combine the codes in a different way; and so, thereby, end up with a different understanding. Moreover, whereas the classical text tends to enforce a particular model of integrating the codes, the modern plural text does not (XII).

As Barthes guides the reader through the entirety of Balzac’s text, he systematically notes and explains the usage of each of these codes as they occur. He also offers a more academic outline of the text in Annex 3.

=== Hermeneutic code: the mysteries of the text ===
The hermeneutic code is associated with enigmas of the text: puzzles and mysteries that the text may or may not eventually answer, and of which the final resolution (if present) is likely to be deferred and subject to misdirection—thus keeping the reader guessing. When Barthes identifies an enigma in the text, he marks it "HER." (short for hermeneutic). The process of revealing truth by solving enigmas is further broken down in the following sequence (LXXXIX):

1. Thematisation: What in the narrative is an enigma?
2. Positioning: Additional confirmations of the enigma.
3. Formulation of the enigma.
4. Promise of an answer of the enigma.
5. Fraud: Circumvention of the true answer.
6. Equivocation: Mixture of fraud and truth.
7. Blocking: The enigma cannot be solved.
8. Suspended answer: Halting the revelation after having begun.
9. Partial answer: Some facets of the truth are revealed.
10. Disclosure of the truth.

Because the hermeneutic code involves a move from a question to an answer, it is one of the two codes (the other being the proairetic, or action, code) which Barthes calls “irreversible” (XV): once a secret is revealed, it cannot be unrevealed—the moment of cognition is permanent for the reader. Compared to the detailed sequential actions of the proairetic code, the hermeneutic code encompasses larger questions about the story's entire narrative.

=== Proairetic code: the narrative drive of the text ===
The proairetic code, often referred to as the action code and so marked with "ACT." by Barthes, encompasses the actions or small (scene-like) sequences of the narrative (Annex 2) which create narrative tension. By telling us that someone 'had been sleeping', we now anticipate their waking up—thus constructing a small unit of narrative tension and expectation. From these units, the whole narrative acquires a forward drive. This is connected with Barthes' notion of the “readerly” text: the reader assimilates distinct pieces of information in a prescribed order; even acts of psychological introspection in the novel are classified, by the reader, in terms of the occurrence of movements or activities; thus, the proairetic code constitutes the text as a location, with both spatial and temporal dimensions through which the reader moves.

=== Semantic code: the resonances of the text ===
The semantic (or, sometimes, semic; marked with "SEM.") code concerns meaning, but at the level of connotation in relation to character—that is, the meanings beyond the 'literal' denotation of the words: the 'resonances', or additional linguistic associations, between signifier and character. The semantic code will thus work to construct an evolving character through signifiers such as name, costume, physical appearance, psychological traits, speech, and lexis, all of which may also have different connotations in other contexts elsewhere in the story.

=== Symbolic code: the symbolic structure of the text ===
The symbolic ("SYM.") code produces a structure of (often paired) symbolic meanings, accumulated throughout the text to establish a larger structure within which the meanings of the story unfold. These symbolic clusters of meanings might be organized around such oppositions as male/female, inside/outside, hidden/revealed, or hot/cold. Some of the key symbolic processes in Sarrasine, according to Barthes, are: (1) rhetorical (transgression of the rhetorical figure: antitheses); (2) sexual (transgression of the sex: castration); and (3) economic (transgression of the origin of wealth) (XCII). This structure is not itself stable, and the work of the 'writerly' reader is to pursue these structures until they begin to break down—a symbolic collapse that is a key part of the pleasures of the text.

=== Cultural code: the background knowledge of the text ===
The cultural code—in Barthes' shorthand, "REF."—is constituted by the points at which the text refers to common bodies of knowledge. These might be agreed, shared knowledge (e.g. the real-world existence of the Faubourg Saint-Honoré) or an assertion of axiomatic truths (e.g. the first sentence's assertion that all men daydream at parties, no matter how lively the party is); Barthes calls the latter a "gnomic code".

== Voices ==
The five codes together constitute a way of interpreting the text which suggests that textuality is interpretive; that the codes are not superimposed upon the text, but rather approximate something intrinsic to the text. The analogy Barthes uses to clarify the relationship of codes to text is to the relationship between a performance and the commentary that can be heard off-stage. In the “stereographic space” created by the codes, each code becomes associated with a voice. To the proairetic code Barthes assigns the Voice of Empirics; to the semic the Voice of the Person; to the cultural the Voice of Science; to the hermeneutic the Voice of Truth; and to the symbolic the Voice of Symbol.
