= Knowledge and Human Interests =

1968 book by Jürgen Habermas

- Cover of the first edition
- Author: Jürgen Habermas
- Original title: Erkenntnis und Interesse
- Translator: Jeremy J. Shapiro
- Language: German
- Subject: Sociology of knowledge
- Publisher: Suhrkamp Verlag, Heinemann Educational Books
- Publication date: 1968
- Publication place: Germany
- English publication date: 1972
- Media type: Print (Hardcover and Paperback)
- Pages: 392 (1987 Polity edition)
- ISBN: 0-7456-0459-5 (Polity edition)

Knowledge and Human Interests (German: Erkenntnis und Interesse) is a 1968 book by the German philosopher Jürgen Habermas, in which the author discusses the development of the modern natural and human sciences. He criticizes Sigmund Freud, arguing that psychoanalysis is a branch of the humanities rather than a science, and provides a critique of the philosopher Friedrich Nietzsche.

Habermas's first major systematic work, Knowledge and Human Interests has been compared to the philosopher Paul Ricœur's Freud and Philosophy (1965). It received positive reviews, which identified it as forming part of an important body of work. However, critics have found Habermas's attempt to discuss the relationship between knowledge and human interests unsatisfactory, and his work obscure in style. Some commentators have found his discussion of Freud valuable, while others have questioned his conclusions.

== Summary ==
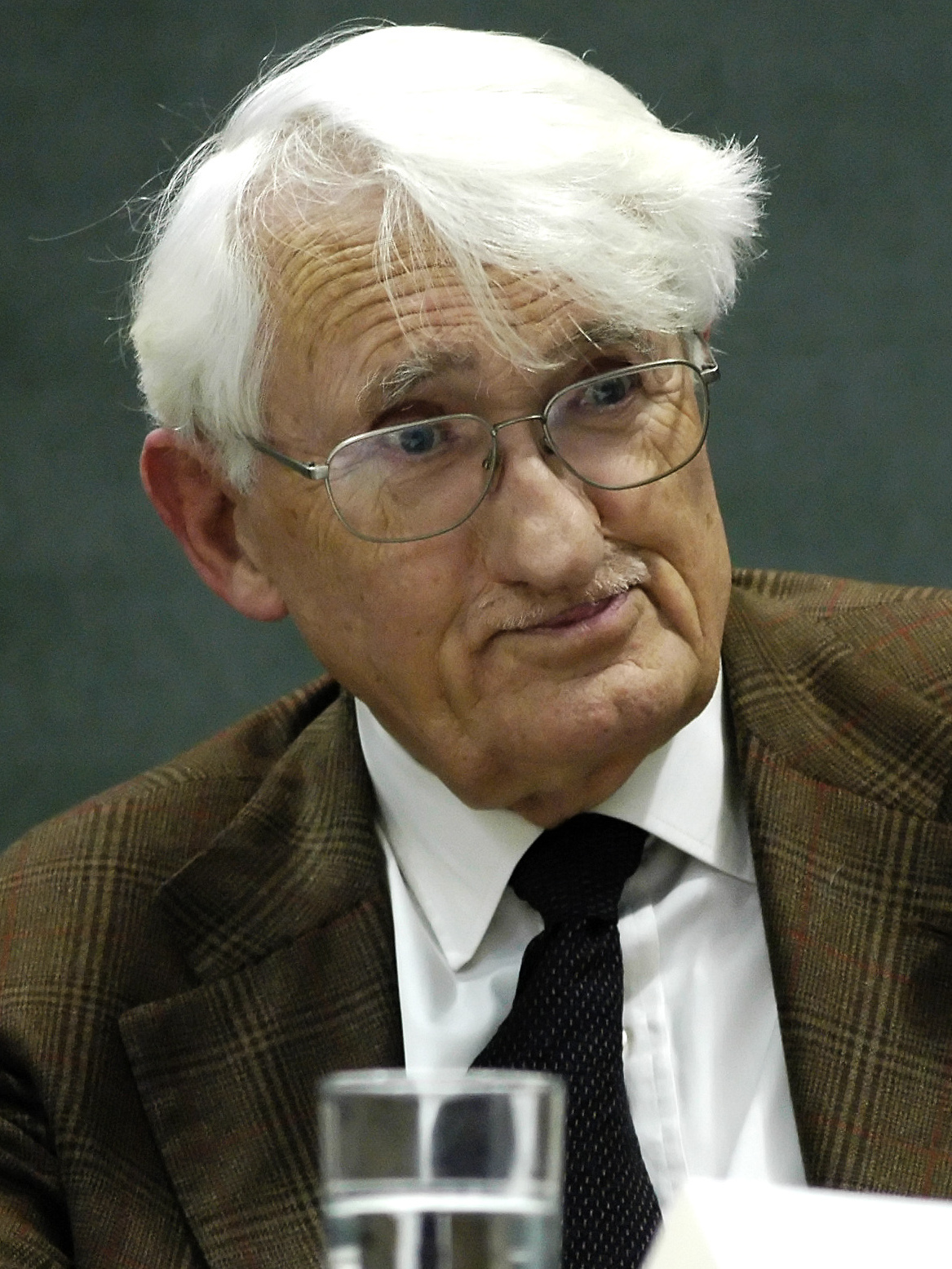
Jürgen Habermas

Habermas discusses the history of positivism, aiming to provide an analysis of "the connections between knowledge and human interests." He relates his ideas to those of the philosopher Karl Marx, explaining that he develops an idea "implicit in Marx's theory of society". He states that psychoanalysis occupies an important place as an example within his framework. He argues that modern philosophical discussion has been focused on the question of deciding how reliable knowledge is possible, the field of epistemology. In his view, rationalism and empiricism were both concerned with "the metaphysical demarcation of the realm of objects and the logical and psychological justification of the validity of a natural science characterized by formalized language and experiment."

According to Habermas, while physics was sometimes the model for "clear and distinct knowledge" in the 19th century, philosophy and science remained distinct, as did epistemology and philosophy of science. He argues that since the philosopher Georg Wilhelm Friedrich Hegel's critique of the work of the philosopher Immanuel Kant, science and philosophy have become disconnected, with the result that science is no longer "seriously comprehended by philosophy", making it necessary to reexamine the nature of science and scientific knowledge and the role of the philosophy of science. Other philosophers Habermas discusses include Johann Gottlieb Fichte, Auguste Comte, Ernst Mach, Charles Sanders Peirce, Wilhelm Dilthey, and Edmund Husserl; in the course of discussing Dilthey, he examines hermeneutics.

In his discussion of the work of Sigmund Freud, the founder of psychoanalysis, Habermas argues that psychoanalysis is the "only tangible example of a science incorporating methodical self-reflection", but that while it had the potential to exceed the limits of positivism, this has remained unrealized because of its "scientific self-misunderstanding", for which Freud was responsible. He also provides a critique of the philosopher Friedrich Nietzsche, arguing that Nietzsche tacitly accepted some "basic positivist assumptions".

== Background and publication history ==
According to Habermas, he first expounded the views he developed in the book in his Frankfurt inaugural address of June 1965, while his discussion of positivism, pragmatism and historicism had its origins in lectures he delivered in Heidelberg in 1963 and 1964. He expressed his indebtedness to the philosopher Karl-Otto Apel and the psychoanalysts Alexander Mitscherlich and Alfred Lorenzer.

Knowledge and Human Interests was first published by Suhrkamp Verlag in 1968, with the exception of its appendix, which had been published in Merkur in 1965 (reprinted in Technik und Wissenschaft als 'Ideologie', 1968). In 1972, an English translation by the philosopher Jeremy J. Shapiro was published by Heinemann Educational Books. In 1987, an English edition was published by Polity Press in association with Blackwell Publishers.

== Reception ==
Knowledge and Human Interests received positive reviews from Fred E. Jandt in the Journal of Applied Communication Research, Thomas B. Farrell in the Quarterly Journal of Speech, and the sociologist Anthony Giddens in the American Journal of Sociology, a mixed review from the sociologist Steven Lukes in the British Journal of Sociology, and a negative review from the sociologist David Martin in the Jewish Journal of Sociology.

Jandt found the book promising, though he considered it difficult to assess because of Habermas's competence in fields ranging from the logic of science to the sociology of knowledge. Farrell found the book ambitious in its goals and dispassionate in its approach. He believed that it formed part of a body of work which "comprises a dialectic sufficiently rigorous to indict and perhaps dislodge behavioral and scientistic theories of communication." Giddens described the book as one of Habermas's "major writings", adding that it was comparable to works such as Legitimation Crisis (1973) and "culminates the first phase of Habermas's career and remains perhaps the most hotly debated of his works." He credited Habermas with developing and clarifying his arguments that the social sciences require connecting hermeneutics with empiricist philosophies of science.

Lukes found the book disappointing. He wrote that, "Its style is unnecessarily obscure and high-flown, its lack of fine-grained philosophical analysis disappointing, and its concentration on the exegesis of other thinkers essentially diversionary." He maintained that while Habermas had interesting things to say about several thinkers, especially Freud, most of the exegesis was "familiar", while some of it was "perverse", such as Habermas's "juxtaposition of Comte and Mach under the label of 'positivism'." He credited Habermas with providing a systematic account of his view of his "philosophical ancestors", which he considered valuable since Habermas was an important representative of the Frankfurt School, but believed Habermas failed to provide a satisfactory discussion of critical science or a direct discussion of the connection between knowledge and human interests. Martin argued that the work reflected the "impasse of the sociology of knowledge" and failed to explain how transforming social relations would make objectivity possible.

Knowledge and Human Interests was discussed by Paul Ricœur in the Journal of the American Psychoanalytic Association, Rainer Nagele, Roland Reinhart, and Roger Blood in New German Critique, Kenneth Colburn Jr. in Sociological Inquiry, Steven Vogel in Praxis International, Richard Tinning in Quest, Jennifer Scuro in The Oral History Review, and Myriam N. Torres and Silvia E. Moraes in the International Journal of Action Research. In Philosophy of the Social Sciences, it was discussed by Stephen D. Parsons and Michael Power.

Ricœur endorsed Habermas's view that psychoanalysis misunderstood itself by claiming to be a natural science. Colburn questioned whether Habermas's attempt to demonstrate the connection between knowledge and interest helped him to critique positivism. He argued against Habermas that interest is not independent of knowledge. He criticized Habermas's definition of knowledge. Torres and Moraes described Knowledge and Human Interests as a "seminal work", and credited Habermas with providing "the theoretical framework for understanding curriculum and educational research."

The philosopher Walter Kaufmann criticized Habermas for poor scholarship in his treatment of Nietzsche. He noted that Habermas relied on the inadequate edition of Nietzsche's works prepared by Karl Schlechta. The philosopher Leszek Kołakowski identified Knowledge and Human Interests as one of Habermas's principal books. However, he questioned the accuracy of Habermas's understanding of both psychoanalysis and Marx's work, and criticized Habermas for failing to clearly define the concept of "emancipation". The philosopher Adolf Grünbaum noted that Habermas's conclusions had influenced both philosophers and psychoanalysts. However, he criticized Habermas's discussion of the scientific status of psychoanalysis. He described Habermas's arguments as inconsistent and his conclusions about the therapeutic effects of psychoanalytic treatment as incoherent as well as incompatible with Freud's hypotheses. He also argued that Habermas had a limited understanding of science and put forward a mistaken contrast between the human sciences and sciences such as physics. He rejected Habermas's view that it is the acceptance of psychoanalytic interpretations by patients in analytic treatment that establishes their validity and accused Habermas of quoting Freud out of context to help him make his case.

The philosopher Douglas Kellner credited Habermas with demonstrating the importance of psychoanalysis for "increasing understanding of human nature and contributing to the process of self-formation". He suggested that Habermas made better use of several Freudian ideas in Knowledge and Human Interests than did Marcuse in Eros and Civilization. The philosopher Jeffrey Abramson compared Knowledge and Human Interests to Herbert Marcuse's Eros and Civilization (1955), Norman O. Brown's Life Against Death (1959), Philip Rieff's Freud: The Mind of the Moralist (1959) and Paul Ricœur's Freud and Philosophy (1965). He wrote that these books jointly placed Freud at the center of moral and philosophical inquiry. The philosopher Tom Rockmore described Knowledge and Human Interests as a "complex study". He suggested that it may eventually be recognized as Habermas's most significant work. He found Habermas's discussion of Freud valuable, but argued that by attributing a view of knowledge and interest similar to his to Freud, he "cloaks his own theory in the prestige of Freud's." The philosopher Jonathan Lear blamed Knowledge and Human Interests, along with Ricœur's Freud and Philosophy, for convincing some psychoanalysts that reasons cannot be causes. He credited Grünbaum with effectively criticizing Habermas.

The historian Paul Robinson described Habermas's thinking about the nature of analytic cures as obscure. The critic Frederick Crews criticized Habermas for helping to inspire unscientific defenses of Freud and psychoanalysis. He also charged him with misunderstanding Freud. He endorsed Grünbaum's criticism of Habermas. The philosopher Alan Ryan argued that Knowledge and Human Interests represented Habermas's "most radical thoughts about the connection between philosophical speculation and social emancipation". However, he maintained that the implications of its ideas for the social sciences were unclear, and that Habermas failed to develop them in his later work. He observed that readers who had initially been impressed by Habermas had been disappointed by this. The sociologist William Outhwaite described Knowledge and Human Interests as "enormously ambitious and challenging". However, he noted that, following its publication, Habermas's interests shifted away from its focus on epistemological questions and toward "language and communicative action." The philosopher Jon Barwise identified Knowledge and Human Interests as Habermas's first major systematic work.

== See also ==
- Freud and His Critics
- Main Currents of Marxism
- The Foundations of Psychoanalysis
