= Sontag: Her Life and Work =

2019 book by Benjamin Moser

- Front cover and spine of first edition Susan Sontag, New York, April 10, 1978, photograph by Richard Avedon
- Author: Benjamin Moser
- Audio read by: Tavia Gilbert
- Cover artist: Richard Avedon (photo); Allison Saltzman (design)
- Language: English
- Subject: Susan Sontag
- Publisher: Ecco
- Publication date: September 17, 2019
- Publication place: United States
- Media type: Print (hardcover and paperback), e-book, audiobook
- Pages: 832
- Awards: Pulitzer Prize for Biography or Autobiography
- ISBN: 978-0-06-289639-1 (hardcover)
- OCLC: 1057731049
- Dewey Decimal: 818/.5409 B
- LC Class: PS3569.O6547 Z767 2019
- Website: www.benmoser.com/books/sontag

Sontag: Her Life and Work is a 2019 biography of American writer Susan Sontag written by Benjamin Moser.

The book won the 2020 Pulitzer Prize for Biography or Autobiography. Judges of the prize called the book "an authoritatively constructed work told with pathos and grace, that captures the writer's genius and humanity alongside her addictions, sexual ambiguities, and volatile enthusiasms."

== Background ==
On February 27, 2013, John Williams of The New York Times reported that writer Benjamin Moser signed an agreement to write the authorized biography of Susan Sontag. Moser was approached by Sontag's son, David Rieff, and the literary agent Andrew Wylie to write the biography. Moser previously wrote Why This World (2009), a biography of the Brazilian writer Clarice Lispector. The book was a finalist for the 2009 National Book Critics Circle Award for Biography. Moser wrote at the time that he expected to take at least three to four years to complete a biography of Sontag.

In preparation of the biography, Moser was given access to Sontag's restricted archive of unpublished journals, medical files, personal papers, and computer files. Moser also conducted hundreds of interviews with Sontag's family, friends and adversaries, including individuals who had previously not spoken publicly about Sontag such as Salman Rushdie and Annie Leibovitz.

== Contents ==
=== Authorship claim ===
In May 2019, Alison Flood reported in The Guardian that Benjamin Moser would present evidence in Sontag: Her Life and Work that while Philip Rieff's book Freud: The Mind of the Moralist was based partly on Rieff's research, the book was actually written by Sontag rather than by Rieff. According to Flood, Moser told The Guardian that Sontag agreed for the book to be published as Rieff's work only because she was involved in an "acrimonious divorce" with him and wanted to prevent "her ex-husband from taking her child."

In an extract from his book published in Harper's Magazine, Moser stated that Sontag always claimed to be the real author of Freud: The Mind of the Moralist after its publication. Moser maintained that there were "contemporary witnesses" to her authorship of the book, and that Sontag's views were apparent in its comments on women and homosexuality. According to Moser, Sontag permitted Rieff to claim to be its author despite advice from her friend Jacob Taubes, and Rieff granted only that Sontag was "co-author" of the book. The journalist Janet Malcolm criticized Moser's claims, arguing in The New Yorker that he failed to substantiate them and that they reflected his dislike of Rieff. Len Gutkin, who observed that Rieff's reputation rested partly on Freud: The Mind of the Moralist, wrote in The Chronicle of Higher Education that much of Moser's evidence was "compelling". He also suggested that whoever wrote the book had plagiarized from the critic M. H. Abrams's The Mirror and the Lamp (1953), arguing that it contains closely similar passages. Kevin Slack, a professor at Hillsdale College, and William Batchelder, a professor at Waynesburg University, have challenged Moser's claim by arguing Moser has a bias against Rieff. They compare Freud: The Mind of the Moralist to Rieff's earlier dissertation, which they argue Moser shows no evidence of having read in Sontag: Her Life and Work. They argue that Sontag's sole authorship is highly unlikely because much of the book is drawn from the dissertation: "To defend his position, Moser would have to make the absurd argument that Sontag wrote every word of Rieff's earlier dissertation, an argument even Moser balks at making."

== Publication ==
Sontag: Her Life and Work was published in hardcover, e-book and audiobook format by Ecco, an imprint of HarperCollins, on September 17, 2019. The audiobook is narrated by Tavia Gilbert. The book's dust jacket was designed by Allison Saltzman and features a photograph of Susan Sontag in New York on April 10, 1978, photographed by Richard Avedon.

A trade paperback edition of the book will be published by Ecco on September 15, 2020.

== Reception ==
Kirkus Reviews called the book "a comprehensive, intimate—and surely definitive" biography of Sontag.

Publishers Weekly called it a "doorstopper biography" but felt the book was "likely to deter all but her most ardent admirers" due to its length.

In her review for The Atlantic, Merve Emre panned the biography as a failure of its subject and criticized Moser's interpretation of Sontag as clinical and relying on "armchair psychology". Emre also called it "no more psychologically revealing" than Sontag's diaries or the unauthorized biography by Carl Rollyson and Lisa Paddock, Susan Sontag: The Making of an Icon (2000) ISBN 978-0-393-04928-2.

== Publication history ==
- Sontag: Her Life and Work. New York: Ecco. 2019. ISBN 978-0-06-289639-1.
- Sontag: Her Life. London: Allen Lane. 2019. ISBN 978-0-241-00348-0.
- Sontag. Haar leven en werk (in Dutch). Translated by Biekmann, Lidwien. Amsterdam: De Arbeiderspers. 2019. ISBN 978-90-295-3978-4.
- Sontag: Vida e Obra (in Portuguese). Translated by Couto, José Geraldo. São Paulo: Companhia das Letras. 2019. ISBN 978-85-359-3283-6.

== Film adaptation ==
In February 2023, it was announced that a biographical film adaptation by Kirsten Johnson and starring Kristen Stewart as Sontag was in development, with a working title of Sontag. Filming was expected to take place in California, New York, Paris and Sarajevo in late 2023.
