= Freud: The Mind of the Moralist =

1959 book by Philip Rieff

- Cover of the first edition
- Author: Philip Rieff
- Language: English
- Subject: Sigmund Freud
- Publisher: Viking Press
- Publication date: 1959
- Publication place: United States
- Media type: Print (Hardcover and Paperback)
- Pages: 441 (1961 edition)
- ISBN: 978-0226716398

Freud: The Mind of the Moralist (1959; second edition 1961; third edition 1979) is a book about Sigmund Freud, the founder of psychoanalysis, by the sociologist Philip Rieff, in which the author places Freud and psychoanalysis in historical context. Rieff described his goal as being to "show the mind of Freud ... as it derives lessons on the right conduct of life from the misery of living it."

One of Rieff's most influential writings, Freud: The Mind of the Moralist has been called "brilliant" and a "great book". It helped to establish Rieff's reputation, and to place Freud at the center of moral and philosophical inquiry; it has been compared to works such as the philosopher Paul Ricœur's Freud and Philosophy (1965). The writer Susan Sontag, Rieff's wife at the time, contributed to the work to such an extent that she has been considered its unofficial co-author and was recognized as such by Rieff himself in his inscription of a copy of the book he gave decades later to her: "Susan, Love of my life, mother of my son, co-author of this book: forgive me. Please. Philip"; it has also been claimed that she was its true author, but she gave up claiming recognition as a result of a separation agreement.

== Summary ==
Rieff describes his objective as being to "show the mind of Freud ... as it derives lessons on the right conduct of life from the misery of living it." He also discusses the psychiatrist Carl Jung, the psychoanalysts Wilhelm Reich and Erich Fromm, and the novelist D. H. Lawrence.

== Publication history ==
Freud: The Mind of the Moralist was first published in 1959. In 1961, it was published by Anchor Books. In 1979, a third edition was published by University of Chicago Press.

== Reception ==
Freud: The Mind of the Moralist was influential, and brought Rieff to the attention of psychiatrists, psychologists, social scientists, and intellectuals. It has been credited with helping to place Freud at the center of moral and philosophical inquiry, and has been praised by many authors. The book has been compared by Aeschliman to the cultural anthropologist Ernest Becker's The Denial of Death (1973), the psychologist Paul Vitz's Sigmund Freud's Christian Unconscious (1988), by philosopher Jeffrey Abramson to the Herbert Marcuse's Eros and Civilization (1955), the classicist Norman O. Brown's Life Against Death (1959), and the philosopher Jürgen Habermas's Knowledge and Human Interests (1968). The book has also been compared to the philosopher Paul Ricœur's Freud and Philosophy (1965) by both Abramson and Ricœur.

Elisabeth Lasch-Quinn and the sociologist Neil Smelser both considered Freud: The Mind of the Moralist brilliant, while M. D. Aeschliman and Stephen L. Gardner both described it as a "great book". The critic Frederick Crews called Freud: The Mind of the Moralist the most helpful book about Freud for "placing psychoanalysis in the context of the intellectual and scientific history and the ethical assumptions from which it emerged". The historian Paul Robinson argued that Freud: The Mind of the Moralist shows that Rieff was the most "erudite and forceful" right-wing author to portray Freud as a thinker whose theories had conservative implications. The philosopher John Forrester considered the book a "classic work" and the indispensable guide to the way in which Freud viewed his work as "embodying essential elements of the cultural traditions to which he was self-consciously heir". Gary Alan Fine and Philip Manning considered it part of a body of work with ongoing relevance to contemporary social theory, and Howard L. Kaye believed it showed why Freud was culturally central, and Rieff an essential social theorist. Lasch-Quinn called the book an "intellectual biography of uncommon suppleness, and a genuine literary achievement". She considered Rieff's expression "psychological man" a memorable term for a new human type who is forever "anxious and insecure" and has an unprecedented obsession with self. Kaye argued that the decline of Freud's reputation since the publication of Freud: The Mind of the Moralist does not diminish its value.

The book critic George Scialabba called the book a "penetrating and imaginative study" and a "vigorous dissent" from the standard interpretation of Freud as a proponent of liberation from morality. He maintained that its "melodramatic" style foreshadowed Rieff's later "apocalyptic abstractions", and suggested that the historian Christopher Lasch provided a better discussion of contemporary narcissism. However, the book has been criticized by the philosophers Donald C. Abel and Adolf Grünbaum. Abel questioned Rieff's argument that Freud's theory is not hedonistic and his view that Freud did not counsel people to follow the pleasure principle, instead advocating following the reality principle. He argued that in opposing the pleasure principle and the reality principle, Rieff ignored the fact that the latter is an extension of the former. Grünbaum rejected Rieff's view that Freud, in his psychology of religion, was guilty of the "genetic fallacy", and that all psychoanalytic interpretations are tantamount to moral judgments. He accused Rieff of trying to increase support for religion by using psychology to discredit atheism. Smelser considered the work difficult reading for those not familiar with the works of Freud, Jung, Reich, and Lawrence.

Freud: The Mind of the Moralist received positive reviews from the sociologist Richard LaPiere in the American Journal of Sociology and the psychologist Henry Murray in American Sociological Review. The book was also reviewed by Education. LaPiere praised the work, calling it "elegant and erudite" and "an intellectual tour de force." He believed that it provided a better explanation of "Freudian concepts" than any other source. Murray wrote that the book was "subtle and substantial" and well-organized. He considered it "one of those rare products of profound analytic thought and judgment whose most distinctive benefits are inevitably reserved for those who will sit down and brood on it, withholding verdicts until digestion is complete". He also called Freud: The Mind of the Moralist an "unsentimental work composed by a coolly critical, closely identified admirer after a penetrating, scrupulous examination of the whole wide scope of the Master's published writings." He credited Rieff with providing a "detailed and exact" survey of Freud's view of the human personality, and "superbly balanced" judgments of Freud's work.

Carl Rollyson and Lisa Paddock described Freud: The Mind of the Moralist as the work that established Rieff's reputation. They also identified Sontag as its unofficial co-author, noting Rieff worked on the book while he was married to her. They cited the fact that Rieff, in his acknowledgements for the first edition of the book, "thanked Susan in conventionally feminine terms" and gave her name as "Susan Rieff", as evidence of his conservatism, noting also that Rieff, after his divorce from Sontag, deleted her name from the acknowledgements of subsequent editions of the book. They dismissed Rieff's view that Freud "anchored himself in the traditional in order to subvert it".

In May 2019, Alison Flood reported in The Guardian that the writer Benjamin Moser, in his biography of Sontag titled Sontag: Her Life and Work due to be published in September 2019, would present evidence that while Freud: The Mind of the Moralist was based partly on Rieff's research, the book was actually written by Sontag rather than by Rieff. According to Flood, Moser told The Guardian that Sontag agreed for the book to be published as Rieff's work only because she was involved in an "acrimonious divorce" with him and wanted to prevent "her ex-husband from taking her child." Moser, in an extract from his book published in Harper's Magazine, stated that Sontag always claimed to be the real author of Freud: The Mind of the Moralist after its publication. Moser maintained that there were "contemporary witnesses" to her authorship of the book, and that Sontag's views were apparent in its comments on women and homosexuality. According to Moser, Sontag permitted Rieff to claim to be its author despite advice from her friend Jacob Taubes, and Rieff granted only that Sontag was "co-author" of the book. The journalist Janet Malcolm criticized Moser's claims, arguing in The New Yorker that he failed to substantiate them and that they reflected his dislike of Rieff. Len Gutkin, who observed that Rieff's reputation rested partly on Freud: The Mind of the Moralist, wrote in The Chronicle of Higher Education that much of Moser's evidence was "compelling". He also suggested that whoever wrote the book had plagiarized from the critic M. H. Abrams's The Mirror and the Lamp (1953), arguing that it contains closely similar passages. Kevin Slack and William Batchelder, showing examples of Moser's bias against Rieff, also provide evidence to dispute Moser's claim. Comparing the book to Rieff’s earlier dissertation, they argue that Sontag’s sole authorship of the book is impossible because much of it is drawn from the dissertation: "To defend his position, Moser would have to make the absurd argument that Sontag wrote every word of Rieff’s earlier dissertation, an argument even Moser balks at making."

== See also ==
- Freud: A Life for Our Time
