= Hello, Hello Brazil: Popular Music in the Making of Modern Brazil =

Book by historian Bryan McCann

- Author: Bryan McCann
- Language: English
- Published: May 2004
- Publisher: Duke University Press
- Publication place: United States
- Pages: 396

Hello, Hello Brazil: Popular Music in the Making of Modern Brazil is a book by historian Bryan McCann published by Duke University Press in 2004.

This book discusses the social impacts of Brazilian music in society and culture between the 1920s and 1950s. Alongside the social impacts during the time period, the book analyzes the long-term effects of the music in Brazilian culture and how it shaped modern-day Brazil.

== Synopsis ==
McCann's thesis in this book is that through the political movement of President Getúlio Vargas and the Estado Novo (third Brazilian Republic), the growth of the Brazilian culture industry and the country's rapid industrialization, a new music was formed in conscious effort to help shape Brazil to be a modern country. Because of these three factors, modern Brazil was impacted past the 1930s to 1950s when most of these changes were occurring. The book analyzes the creation of that new popular music and explores its deeper implications. It also explores how these processes enabled the creation of enduring cultural tendencies which supports his thesis that music produced during the set time period would help structure Brazilian culture life well into the twenty-first century.

McCann analyzes the political effect on radio and music as well as the link between culture and national identity to the music created and produced. The composer Lamartine Babo and musician Almirante are two of the many people he credits for helping turn the musical and popular culture tide in Brazil. Their Afro-Brazilian fusion of music, and their performance style for the radio and other audiences, helped cement popular culture for years to come.

McCann makes note of the potential critiques about his research, including that he concentrates almost entirely on the music produced in Rio de Janeiro and not in other cities. He explains that the primary audience for the music is the metropolitan Brazilian, and Rio was the bureaucratic and cultural capital of the nation, home to Brazil's principal recording studios and radio stations.

== Critical reception ==
Review by Frederick Moehn in the Latin American Music Review 28 (2007): 309-315.

Review by Christopher Dunn in the Luso-Brazilian Review 43 (2006): 156-160.

Review by Sean Stroud in the Journal of Latin American Studies 37 (2005): 398-400.

== Awards ==
- Winner, 2005 Roberto Reis Prize, from the Brazilian Studies Association
- Winner, 2005 Woody Guthrie Award, International Association for the Study of Popular Music
