= Nona Balakian Citation for Excellence in Reviewing =

Annual American literary award

The Nona Balakian Citation for Excellence in Reviewing, established in 1991, is an annual literary award presented by the National Book Critics Circle (NBCC) to honor Nona Balakian, one of three NBCC founders. The award recognizes an NBCC's members "outstanding work" and has been called "the most prestigious award for book criticism in the country."

== Recipients ==
John Leonard Prize winners and honors
Year	Recipient	Result	Ref.
1991	George Scialabba	Winner	
1992	Elizabeth Ward	Winner	
1993	Brigitte Frase	Winner	
1994	JoAnn C. Gutin	Winner	
1995	Laurie Stone	Winner	
1996	Dennis Drabelle	Winner	
1997	Thomas Mallon	Winner	
1998	Albert Mobilio	Winner	
1999	Benjamin Schwarz	Winner	
2000	Daniel Mendelsohn	Winner	
2001	Michael Gorra	Winner	
2002	Maureen N. McLane	Winner	
2003	Scott McLemee	Winner	
2004	David Orr	Winner	
2005	Wyatt Mason	Winner	
2005	Katherine Powers	Finalist	
2005	Allen Barra	Finalist	
2005	Carlin Romano	Finalist	
2006	Steven G. Kellman	Winner	
2006	Ron Charles	Finalist	
2006	Kathryn Harrison	Finalist	
2006	Gideon Lewis-Kraus	Finalist	
2006	Donna Rifkind	Finalist	
2007	Sam Anderson	Winner	
2007	Adam Kirsch	Finalist	
2007	Brooke Allen	Finalist	
2007	Ron Charles	Finalist	
2007	Walter Kirn	Finalist	
2008	Ron Charles	Winner	
2008	Kathryn Harrison	Finalist	
2008	Laila Lalami	Finalist	
2008	Michael Antman	Finalist	
2008	Todd Shy	Finalist	
2009	Joan Acocella	Winner	
2009	Donna Seaman	Finalist	
2009	Michael Antman	Finalist	
2009	Wendy Smith	Finalist	
2009	William Deresiewicz	Finalist	
2010	Parul Sehgal	Winner	
2010	Kathryn Harrison	Finalist	
2010	Ruth Franklin	Finalist	
2010	Sarah L. Courteau	Finalist	
2010	William Deresiewicz	Finalist	
2011	Kathryn Schulz	Winner	
2011	William Deresiewicz	Finalist	
2011	Ruth Franklin	Finalist	
2011	Garth Risk Hallberg	Finalist	
2011	Kathryn Harrison	Finalist	
2012	William Deresiewicz	Winner	
2012	Abigail Deutsch	Finalist	
2012	Lev Grossman	Finalist	
2012	Garth Risk Hallberg	Finalist	
2012	Kathryn Harrison	Finalist	
2013	Katherine A. Powers	Winner	
2013	Ruth Franklin	Finalist	
2013	James Marcus	Finalist	
2013	Roxana Robinson	Finalist	
2013	Alexandra Schwartz	Finalist	
2014	Alexandra Schwartz	Winner	
2014	Charles Finch	Finalist	
2014	B. K. Fischer	Finalist	
2014	Benjamin Moser	Finalist	
2014	Lisa Russ Spaar	Finalist	
2015	Carlos Lozada	Winner	
2015	Ruth Franklin	Finalist	
2015	James Parker	Finalist	
2015	Roxana Robinson	Finalist	
2015	Leo Robson	Finalist	
2016	Michelle Dean	Winner	
2016	Julia M. Klein	Finalist	
2016	Christian Lorentzen	Finalist	
2016	Becca Rothfeld	Finalist	
2016	Leo Robson	Finalist	
2017	Charles Finch	Winner	
2017	David Biespiel	Finalist	
2017	Maureen Corrigan	Finalist	
2017	Ruth Franklin	Finalist	
2017	James Marcus	Finalist	
2018	Maureen Corrigan	Winner	
2018	David Biespiel	Finalist	
2018	Julia Klein	Finalist	
2018	Becca Rothfield	Finalist	
2018	Wendy Smith	Finalist	
2019	Katy Waldman	Winner	
2019	David Biespiel	Finalist	
2019	Josephine Livingstone	Finalist	
2019	Wendy Smith	Finalist	
2019	David L. Ulin	Finalist	
2020	Josephine Livingstone	Winner	
2020	Dean Rader	Finalist	
2020	Jake Cline	Finalist	
2020	Rumaan Alam	Finalist	
2020	Sophie Haigney	Finalist	
2021	Merve Emre	Winner	
2021	Christoph Irmscher	Finalist	
2021	Julian Lucas	Finalist	
2021	Jeremy Lybarger	Finalist	
2021	Jennifer Wilson	Finalist	
2022	Jennifer Wilson	Winner	
2022	Sarah Chihaya	Finalist	
2022	Christoph Irmscher	Finalist	
2022	Lauren Michele Jackson	Finalist	
2022	Ruth Margalit	Finalist	
2023	Becca Rothfeld	Winner	
2023	Rhoda Feng	Finalist	
2023	Christoph Irmscher	Finalist	
2023	Sophie Pinkham	Finalist	
2023	Audrey Wollen	Finalist	
2024	Lauren M. Jackson	Winner	
2024	Joanna Biggs	Finalist	
2024	Sarah Chihaya	Finalist	
2024	Rhoda Feng	Finalist	
2024	Jeremy Lybarger	Finalist	
2025	Rhoda Feng	Winner	
2025	Edna Bonhomme	Finalist	
2025	Priscilla Gilman	Finalist	
2025	Julia Klein	Finalist	
2025	James Marcus	Finalist	
