= W. J. Cash =

American journalist and writer

- Born: May 2, 1900; Gaffney, South Carolina, United States
- Died: July 1, 1941 (aged 41) (suicide); Hotel Reforma, Mexico City
- Education: Wake Forest College
- Occupations: Journalist, writer
- Spouse: Mary Bagley Ross Northrup (December 24, 1940 - July 1, 1941, his death)
- Writing career
- Language: English
- Years active: 1926-1941
- Genres: Sociology, editorials
- Subjects: American South, fascism
- Notable work: The Mind of the South (1941)
- Notable awards: Pulitzer Prize for Editorial Writing (nominated, 1941); Guggenheim Fellowship (1941)

Wilbur Joseph "Jack" Cash (May 2, 1900 – July 1, 1941) was an American journalist known for writing The Mind of the South (1941), a controversial and influential interpretation of the character and history of the American South.

A protégé of H. L. Mencken and Alfred A. and Blanche Knopf, Cash suffered throughout his life from depression. He died by hanging himself shortly after the publication of the book.

== Life and career ==
=== Early life and education ===
Cash, known as "Jack" throughout his life, was born Joseph Wilbur Cash — he later reversed the order of his given names, and normally used only the initials — and grew up mostly in the mill village of Gaffney, South Carolina. His parents were Nanette Lutitia Hamrick, the organist at the local Baptist church who had previously taught music in the public school, and John William Cash, who managed the company store at the Limestone Mills. His ancestry was German and Scotch-Irish. He had three brothers and a sister, all younger. He was educated at the local public school up to age 12, until his family moved 14 miles away to his mother's home town, Boiling Springs, North Carolina. There, his father became a partner with Cash's maternal grandfather in a general store. For school, Cash attended Boiling Springs High School, a Baptist academy, where his high school classmates called him "Sleepy", due to his tendency to daydream. When he graduated from high school in April 1917, he gave the commencement address. Cash worked at his grandfather's farm in the summers.

Although Cash's mother was a pious Baptist, and he adored her, Cash himself eventually turned away from religion. His relationship with his father was distant and somewhat fraught, as the rigidly conventional man considered his son to be a deviant for not following the religious and social customs of the time. Once when Cash was beaten up in a schoolyard fight, his father sent him back in order to teach him to behave like a man. John William Cash would later say that he did not recognize until much later how bright his son was, although his wife did. "I never did teach [him] that he was smart," he said, "I never did want him to think that he was smarter than most other people."

In 1917 and 1918, Cash did odd jobs at shipyards and military camps from Maryland to Florida. He spent most time in Spartanburg, South Carolina at Camp Wadsworth; his father organized a fleet of cars there to help transport soldiers.

For two school years in 1918–19, Cash followed his father's wish and attended Wofford College, a Methodist school. Cash left because he objected to the school's narrow provincialism. He enrolled in Valparaiso University, a Lutheran college in Valparaiso, Indiana, dropping out around Christmas 1919. In 1920, again at his father's urging, he entered the Baptist school Wake Forest College, despite it being what he considered to be a "preacher college".

The president of Wake Forest at the time was the controversial William Louis Poteat, whose liberal theological stance and espousal and teaching of Darwin's theory of evolution was disturbing to many conservative North Carolina Baptists who supported the school. Poteat and others on the college's faculty encouraged Cash to challenge conventional orthodoxies, and under their tutelage, Cash turned away from enthusiasm for Southern writers such as Thomas Dixon Jr. — whose white supremacist novel The Clansman: A Historical Romance of the Ku Klux Klan (1905) was the basis for D. W. Griffith's 1915 silent film The Birth of a Nation — and towards the work of more cosmopolitan writers such as Joseph Conrad, Fyodor Dostoyevsky, Henry Adams, and Sigmund Freud. Cash affected the style of a bohemian and became known as the campus iconoclast.

During Cash's final two undergraduate years, he served first as managing editor and then associate editor of the college newspaper, the Old Gold & Black, where he emulated H. L. Mencken's style of writing. In his editorials, he opposed the state's Baptist newspaper The Biblical Recorder on issues such as evolution and social dancing. In the summer, he worked at the hosiery mill at which his father was then the superintendent. Cash graduated in 1922 with an A.B., and then attended law school there for a year, before deciding not to pursue a legal career. Cash later declared that he left law school because it "required too much mendacity."

Immediately following college, Cash served a 1923 summer apprenticeship as a reporter for the Charlotte Observer, during which he covered a quickly-suppressed textile mill strike, a lynching, and other events that caused him to begin to see the South in a more realistic way.

For two years, Cash taught English at Georgetown College in Georgetown, Kentucky, and at a high school in North Carolina, before experiencing a nervous collapse. Throughout his life, Cash suffered from manic depression or affective disorder, which manifested itself in breakdowns, periods of depression, fear of sexual impotency, and physical ailments such as not being able to swallow or choking when he spoke. He also suffered from a hyperthyroid condition, occasional alcoholism, and excessive smoking. Cash usually referred to his condition as "neurasthenia".

After his breakdown, at great strain on their finances, Cash's parents paid for him to take a bicycle tour of Western Europe, during which he recovered. When he came back he turned permanently to journalism as his profession.

=== Newspaper career ===
From 1926 to 1928, Cash held several newspaper jobs: a year in Chicago writing for the now-defunct Chicago Evening Post; several months with The Charlotte News during which he wrote a wistful philosophical column titled "The Moving Row"; and a four-month stint during the fall of 1928 as the chief editor of a small semi-weekly newspaper, the Cleveland (County) Press, in Shelby, North Carolina, which he ran almost by himself. In his editorials for the paper, an increasingly liberal Cash excoriated the Ku Klux Klan, championed Democratic presidential candidate Al Smith, a New Yorker, over Republican Herbert Hoover, and decried the anti-Catholic bias which animated Southern Democrats' loathing of Smith. Following Smith's defeat, Cash had another emotional breakdown, and the newspaper folded.

Afterwards, Cash moved back into his parents' house in Boiling Springs – where he lived with his extended family, including his two brothers and their pregnant wives – and became a free-lance journalist, not easy to do in a busy and noisy household. He contributed to H. L. Mencken's The American Mercury magazine, and received encouragement from Mencken. From 1929 to 1935, Cash wrote eight articles about various aspects of the South, (Note: His first piece published in The American Mercury was"Jehovah of the Tar Heels", an attack on U.S. Senator Furnifold M. Simmons from North Carolina, who led efforts to disenfranchise black voters and return Democrats to power in the state. It appeared in July, 1929.) including one in October 1929 called "The Mind of the South", which would become the basis for the later book. (Note: Cash had been inspired by lectures given by Professor C. C. Pearson on "The Mind of Virginia" and "The Mind of North Carolina" he had heard as an undergraduate.)

During the period of primary writing on The Mind of the South (1929 to 1937), Cash continued to live with his parents in Boiling Springs. When his contributions to The American Mercury ended after Lawrence Spivak took over ownership of the magazine, Cash supported himself with freelance weekly book reviews to The Charlotte News from 1935 to 1939, for each of which he received a payment of $3, equivalent to about $60-$65 in 2023. The "book reviews" often became fierce analytical diatribes penetrating the mindset of Nazism under Hitler and Fascism under Mussolini. Cash also wrote occasional editorials for the paper focusing primarily on the danger of Hitler and Mussolini to worldwide democracy, a topic on which he regularly expounded from 1935 and by the late 1930s would overtake his interest in the South and further delay completion of the book.

Despite his focus on the European situation, he also continued to explore local subjects such as health conditions in the Black communities of Charlotte, the violence and depravity of lynchings, and the poor quality of policing in the area, much to the dismay of city boosters, who protested the negative publicity. He also reviewed favorably the writing which was emanating from the Harlem Renaissance in New York, as well as the new generation of Southern writers such as Thomas Wolfe, Erskine Caldwell, and William Faulkner, as well as James Branch Cabell, Lillian Smith, Ellen Glasgow, and Claude McKay.

In October 1937, the strength of the freelance book reviews earned Cash a job as associate editor of the newspaper, which he held until May 1941, and which enabled him to move out of his parents' house. In his new position, Cash was assigned to cover foreign affairs – perhaps to keep him away from angering the local powers-that-be. He wrote editorials on every conceivable topic and stressed the international situation. The Charlotte News was at the time a lively progressive newspaper enjoying the largest circulation of any afternoon daily in the Carolinas, and its broad readership expanded admiration for Cash's writing and extraordinary prescience on the developing war news out of Europe and the Pacific. His writing was considered so eerily predictive of coming events in the war that fellow staff writers at The News affectionately nicknamed him "Zarathustra." Cash also wrote frequent book reviews.

Cash was nominated for a Pulitzer Prize for Editorial Writing in 1941 for his work during 1940 on World War II for the newspaper.

=== The Mind of the South ===
The cover of Cash's The Mind of the South

Cash's seminal article, "The Mind of the South", was published in The American Mercury in October 1929. The aggressive style of the article was heavily influenced by that of Mencken, as Cash had yet to develop his own distinctive voice, but on the basis of the article, and Mencken's enthusiasm for Cash, Blanche Knopf, the wife and partner of the magazine's publisher, Alfred A. Knopf of New York, invited Cash to submit a plan or manuscript for a book-length expansion of the article. In April 1930, with the help of University of North Carolina sociologist Howard W. Odum, Cash submitted a sketch of the proposed book, on the basis of which the Knopfs offered Cash a contract. Over the next 10 years, as Cash worked on the book, the Knopfs – who were known for their sharp instincts about up-and-coming writers – provided both encouragement and small monetary advances to keep him going.

Shortly after he had submitted the sketch of The Mind of the South to the Knopfs, Cash had a physical collapse which prevented him from writing for two years, under doctors' orders to stop writing and get more outdoor exercise. In 1932, however, he began to write seriously again, using the unheated back room of the Boiling Springs Post Office, where his aunt was the postmistress. A perfectionist, he discarded more pages then he kept, but made progress; he also continued to do free-lance writing, despite his poor health, his lack of money, and his significant writer's blocks.

After Cash had some success at The Charlotte News, he finally had the personal and professional confidence he had previously lacked, and his work there helped him to develop his unique style of writing. He also met and fell in love with Mary Bagley Ross Northrup (later known as Mary Maury), a divorced woman who also wrote for the paper, and who helped him to complete the book through his periods of depression, and his continued focus on events in Europe. During this period, Cash would listen to the news on the radio about the Anschluss with Austria, the invasion of Poland, or the fall of France and would pace around the room, biting his nails, hands, and wrists, leaving marks. He would become so upset that he would leave the house and walk the streets at night.

Finally, on July 27, 1940, the last pages of the manuscript were finished and sent to New York. Five months later, on Christmas Eve, Cash and Northrup were married by a justice of the peace in York, South Carolina.

On February 10, 1941, The Mind of the South was published by Knopf. The book, an intuitive socio-historical exploration of Southern culture, received wide critical acclaim at the time and garnered for Cash praise from such sources as Time, The New York Times, The Saturday Review of Literature, and most Southern newspapers of note, although criticism came from the Agrarian group out of Vanderbilt University in Nashville. Cash also received the thanks of Walter White, the director of the NAACP, for the book's liberalism in regard to race and its exposure of the bigotry of the South. Time said of The Mind of the South "Anything written about the South henceforth must start where [Cash] leaves off."

==== Analysis ====
Cash's work has been the subject of continuing debate among scholars since publication and the subject of numerous treatises in academic journals. The book has never been out of print: the first paperback edition was published in 1954, and a new edition was published in 1991 under the Vintage Books imprint of Random House. The book has enjoyed a wide and diverse readership through time and has often been assigned reading in course work in colleges and universities, both in and outside the South. The book had its greatest following during the 1950s and 1960s, at the height of the Civil Rights Movement. It has been praised by many scholars as the virtual bible on the origins of Southern culture and required reading for any serious student on the social history of the South and its conflicts through time.

According to the biographer Bruce Clayton, the central themes in The Mind of the South were romanticism, violence, hyperbolic rhetoric, individualism, and white racial solidarity. Class consciousness was of minor importance. Historian George B. Tindall wrote of the book:

Two major themes dominate the book: the uniformity of the southern mind and its continuity. Class conflict in Cash's view, was limited by the "proto-Dorian bond" by which the common white (like the Doric knight of Sparta) was elevated to the dominant class through the "vastly ego-warming and ego-expanding distinction between the white man and the black." While there were in truth many Souths, the "man at the center" was the back country yeoman farmer of the Old South and his descendants, the people from whom Cash himself sprang. The book challenged both the shopworn cavalier myth of the Old South and the legend of a progressive and modernized South. The region was like "a tree with many age rings, with its limbs and trunk bent and twisted by all the winds of the years, but with its tap root still in the Old South."

Cash explored many tenacious paradoxes – the juxtaposition of class unity and class exploitation, individualism and the "savage ideal" of conformity, fundamentalist morality and the "hell-of-a-fellow complex" – and the complicated interrelationship of these with race, romanticism, rhetoric, leisure, the cult of womanhood (the "lily-pure maid of Astolat"), the rape complex, violence, paternalism, demagoguery, and suspicion of outsiders.

Cash's emphasis on continuity rather than change, thereby downplaying the effects of the Civil War and Reconstruction, led some critics to attack his generalizations. Historian C. Vann Woodward, while praising Cash's vigorous style, rejected Cash's consensus thesis of unity and continuity. Woodward contends that Cash routinely ignored contrary evidence, underrated the Founding Fathers and the Jeffersonians, missed the power of the southern aristocracy, downplayed Blacks, minimized the central importance of slavery, failed to appreciate the Populist movement, and overemphasized the plain white farmers and the Piedmont region, as opposed to the more influential plantation owners in the Black Belt. Perhaps most significantly, Cash's essential Southerness manifests itself in his admiration for many of the core aspects of the region, and leads him to blame much of the South's problems on Northern hatred and "Yankee intervention", a weakness that is seen throughout the book, but is perhaps most significant in Cash's failure to see through the myth that the Reconstruction era was one of Black Republican and carpetbagger misdeeds. This myth, the standard Southern view of the era, has since been thoroughly destroyed by post-World War II scholarship, but there was sufficient evidence debunking it at the time Cash was writing the book if he had chosen to research the subject more completely, and was not blinded by his own prejudices.

Historian Bertram Wyatt-Brown, in his introduction to the 1991 50th anniversary edition of the book, confirms some of Cash's oversights:

[H]e knew nothing of the Charleston, New Orleans and Mobile antebellum planter-merchant classes and little about the sugar and cotton barons who established vast landed estates and built elaborate mansions along the lower Mississippi River. The Blue Grass of Kentucky and the Nashville Basin and the wire grass of Alabama were equally beyond his ken.

Even so, according to Wyatt-Brown, "Cash's major contribution is his exposition of Southern cultural and class patterns... [and] he also has important things to suggest regarding matters of gender and race." He describes The Mind of the South as "more than a social thesis that uses a slightly eccentric methodology. It is a great and brilliantly crafted work in the tradition of the literature of moral advocacy... [which] is Southern in every line." He quotes literary historian Richard H. King as writing that Cash "fuses the Southern capacity for rhetorical extravagance with the less typical capacity for satire and irony. The result is a masterpiece of discursive prose, stylistically one of the most sophisticated works in American historiography."

In his book The South and the Sectional Conflict (1968), historian David M. Potter calls Cash's book a "brilliant synthesis what was especially effective in showing how frontier strains of romanticism merged with upper class chivalric strains in forming a Southern romantic image of life."

The penultimate paragraph from The Mind of the South is often cited as a distillation of the entire book:

Proud, brave, honorable by its lights, courteous, personally generous, loyal, swift to act, often too swift, but signally effective, sometimes terrible, in its action -- such was the South at its best. And such at its best it remains today, despite the great falling away in some of its virtues. Violence, intolerance, aversion and suspicion toward new ideas, an incapacity for analysis, an inclination to act from feeling rather than from thought, an exaggerated individualism and too narrow concept of social responsibility, attachment to fictions and false values, above all too great attachment to racial values and a tendency to justify cruelty and injustice in the name of those values, sentimentality and a lack of realism – these have been its characteristic vices in the past. And, despite changes for the better, they remain its characteristic vices today.

=== In Mexico ===
In March 1941, largely on the strength of the critical success of the book, Cash was awarded a Guggenheim Fellowship, which included a small stipend which would allow him to spend a year writing a novel about the progress of three generations of a Southern cotton mill family, like his own, from the Old South into the modern era. Cash had always considered himself to be superior at writing fiction to non-fiction, as he stated in his October, 1940 application to the Guggenheim Foundation, and so he embraced with great eagerness the opportunity to try his hand at a novel for a year.

Cash had made, first in 1932, then in 1936, two previous applications for Guggenheim grants: the first to have been a study of Lafcadio Hearn, to have been titled "Anatomy of a Romantic," using Hearn as an exemplar by which to study Southern romantics generally, and the second to have been a study of the Nazi mindset by spending a year in Germany, a contrasting reprise of Cash's bicycle tour of pre-Nazi Europe during the summer of 1927. Likely because of Cash's lack of a published major work at the time, both applications were rejected. The third and successful application was sponsored by the Knopfs and by Raleigh News & Observer editor and Guggenheim recipient, Jonathan W. Daniels, who had befriended Cash in 1938. The Fellowship carried with it great prestige, Cash being placed in the select company of Daniels, Thomas Wolfe, and playwright Paul Green, as the only North Carolinians to have received the grant by 1941.

Cash and his wife chose Mexico to spend their year on the Fellowship because it was cheap to live there, and they would have to watch every penny; they embarked on their trip to Mexico City on May 30, 1941. Cash had been invited by University of Texas president Homer Rainey to provide the main commencement address to the 1941 graduating class on June 2 in Austin, Texas. Cash addressed some 1,400 graduates on "The South in a Changing World", focusing on the main developmental socio-psychological themes of the South through history into the modern era. (Note: A recording of this half-hour speech survives and is available at the University of North Carolina Southern Historical Collection in Chapel Hill.)

While in Mexico City, Cash came under an apparent psychotic delusion. On June 30, he told his wife that he heard Nazi assassins whispering in the next room, plotting to kill him. The next day, when he was calmer, she went to get help. On her return with a correspondent they had met earlier, Cash was not in the room. Hours later, he was located in another hotel, the Hotel Reforma, where he had hanged himself with his tie from the bathroom door. (Note: Joseph L. Morrison, in W. J. Cash, Southern Prophet, debunks conspiracy theories about Cash's death.) An autopsy failed to find evidence of a brain tumor. Cash's remains were cremated, and a funeral service was held in the First Baptist Church in Shelby. The ashes were later envaulted in Sunset Cemetery in Shelby.

== Legacy ==
Two biographies of Cash have been published, W. J. Cash: Southern Prophet, by Joseph L. Morrison (Knopf, 1967), and W. J. Cash: A Life, by Bruce Clayton (L.S.U. Press, 1991).

In 1991, to celebrate the fiftieth anniversary of the publication of The Mind of the South, two widely hailed seminars on the South and the impact through time of Cash's book on the South were held at Wake Forest and at the University of Mississippi. Each seminar attracted numerous prominent scholars, journalists and political leaders in multi-day sessions, resulting in two published works of essays, W. J. Cash and the Minds of the South (1992, Louisiana University Press), edited by Paul D. Escott, and The Mind of the South Fifty Years Later (1992, University Press of Mississippi), edited by Charles W. Eagles.
