= Making Samba =

Making Samba: A New History of Race in Brazil
- Author: Marc A. Hertzman
- Language: English
- Genre: Music criticism
- Published: 2013
- Publisher: Duke University Press
- Publication place: United States
- Media type: Print (hardcover paperback)/ Online
- ISBN: 9780822354154

Making Samba: A New History of Race and Music in Brazil is a book by Marc A. Hertzman published by Duke University Press in 2013. Hertzman's concern with the historical narrative surrounding how Samba became one of Brazil's most valuable cultural staples prompted him to write this book. By tracing the careers of Donga and Gilberto Gil from the late nineteenth century to the 1970s, Hertzman explores various themes such as intellectual property claims, popular music, race, gender, national identity, and the history of Afro-Brazilians in Rio de Janeiro, and how they all contribute to the making of Samba within the Brazilian State.

== Synopsis ==
Hertzman's main argument in this book is that the historical narrative surrounding the emergence of samba in Brazil has either been over-criticized, or exceedingly fetishized. By using wide-ranging evidence, such as Brazilian musicians' salary contracts, their involvement and activism with various musical associations, and their encounters with law enforcement, Hertzman explores their struggles in exerting their agency by claiming their music as what he calls, "intellectual property." While Hertzman's book explores different themes such as "musical blackface" and "the purity of samba," Hertzman discusses them within the context of Afro-Brazilian figures that were heavily involved with the progress of Samba so that his argument doesn't get off track.

== Critical reception ==
Making Samba: A New History of Race and Music in Brazil has been highly praised by a variety of historical scholars. Three critical reviews come from Charles A. Perrone in the Luso-Brazilian Review 51 (2014): 209–213. Marshall Eakin in Social History 39 (2014): 287–289. As well as Paulina Alberto in Americas 73 (2016): 266–268. All of these scholars agree that Hertzman's work has been a big success in his field and that it "offers a substantial, indeed superb, contribution to the already robust literature about the birth of samba in the aftermath of slavery in Brazil and its rise to the status of national rhythm by the early twentieth century." Perrone adds, "Even seasoned veterans of this subject will find some edifying surprises."

== Awards ==
The Latin American Studies Association awarded Making Samba Honorable Mention for the 2014 Bryce Wood Book Award.

- Conrad Humanities Scholar (2017–2022)
- New England Council of Latin American Studies Best Dissertation Prize (2009)
- Fulbright-Hays (2004)
