= The Invention of the Beautiful Game =

The Invention of The Beautiful Game: Football and the Making of Modern Brazil
- Author: Gregg Bocketti
- Language: English
- Subject: Football, Brazil
- Genre: History
- Published: 2016
- Publisher: University of Florida Press
- Publication date: May 31
- Publication place: United States
- Pages: 320
- ISBN: 978-0-8130-6255-6
- Website: http://upf.com/book.asp?id=9780813062556

The Invention of The Beautiful Game: Football and the Making of Modern Brazil is a book by historian Gregg Bocketti published by the University of Florida Press in 2016. The book examines “the changes in Brazilian football from the era of Charles Miller and the sportsmen to the consolidation of the ideas of the beautiful game and of Brazil’s ownership of the game, the transition from foot-ball to futebol.”

== Synopsis ==
In the book, the author links football to larger historical themes of contemporary Brazil, and further divides into four chapters that each focuses on separate time frames in the perspective of race, class, region, gender, and nationality. Moreover, through social, cultural, and political lenses, the book explores “Brazilian ideas about the game between 1894 and 1938, and the choices Brazilians made about how to explain football during that period.” In analyzing his collected historical evidences, the author emphasizes several key terms such as professionalization, amateurism, nationalization, popularization, racial exclusivity, and social hierarchies. The book contains 20 illustrative figures and incorporates historical records of prominent football clubs, popular magazines, and sports press as evidence for the author's research.

== Critical reception ==
Critical reception was generally positive. In a review for the Hispanic American Historical Review, writer Bernardo Borges Buarque de Hollanda states that he believes the book made an impactful contribution to adding multiple perspectives to Brazilian football through “questioning the nature of a much-used cliché, the beautiful game, which was crucially internalized as part of common sense and by a portion of the national intellectual community.” Moreover, he marks the book's preeminence in taking an unorthodox way of historical research yet still leaving an impressive remark in providing a fresh content with historical objectivity that was not “swayed by the native exoticism or stereotypes.” H-Net also reviewed the work, with the reviewer stating that the book was “a nuanced and insightful analysis of the contending narratives about the emergence and expansion of football in Brazil, and of how they have produced the powerful nationalist narrative of the futebol nation.” Writing for the Luso-Brazilian Review, Christopher Gaffney praised the book as "a well-written, expertly researched examination of the ways in which [futebol] unfolded among and for elites in Rio and São Paulo" while also commenting that Bocketti "neglect[ed] to reinsert football into broader urban and cultural dynamics".
