= Anti-Zionism: A Jewish History =

2026 book by Benjamin Moser

- First edition cover
- Author: Benjamin Moser
- Audio read by: Benjamin Moser
- Language: English
- Subject: Anti-Zionism
- Publisher: Doubleday
- Publication date: September 22, 2026
- Publication place: New York City
- Media type: Print (hardcover and paperback), e-book, audiobook
- Pages: 400
- ISBN: 9780385551243 (hardcover)
- Website: www.benmoser.com/anti-zionism

Anti-Zionism: A Jewish History is a 2026 non-fiction book written by Benjamin Moser. Published in September 2026, it is a history of Jewish anti-Zionists.

== Synopsis ==
Anti-Zionism: A Jewish History covers the history of Jewish opposition to Zionism through biographical profiles of prominent artists, rabbis, poets, lawyers, activists, journalists, and politicians who challenged Zionism from its birth in the late 19th century to the present. These biographical accounts include Theodor Herzl's contemporary critics, Edwin Montagu and Hannah Arendt. Moser focuses on disagreements over the moral and political implications of Zionism and the movement's relationship to European nationalism, antisemitism, and the history of the Israeli-Palestinian conflict. Through the varying biographies, Moser argues that Jewish opposition to Zionism has a longstanding and diverse intellectual tradition that challenges the conventional narratives surrounding Zionism.

Los Angeles Review of Books described the book: "It doesn't break new ground, nor does it intend to, and it is not a 'history' per se. Rather, it is a kind of literary resurrection, a personal search through lost Jewish choices, following paths long overgrown and figures that history thought best forgotten [...] He doesn't set out to be comprehensive, and his argument is not that the lives and ideas of these figures subvert the Zionist vision of history. Rather, they demonstrate how recent a phenomenon the Zionist consensus is.

== Publication ==
The book was published by Doubleday on September 22, 2026. Moser had previously written on the subject of anti-Zionism in The New York Times and Washington Post.

== Reception ==
Publishers Weekly assessed the book as a "trenchant history of Jewish opposition to Zionism" and said it "highlights Israel's history of mistreatment of both Palestinians and Jewish minorities like Orthodox Jews and Iraqi Jewish immigrants [...] These illuminating profiles in courage challenge the myth of Zionism's unilateral consensus".

Tom Sperlinger of The Guardian wrote, "It is contentious to oppose Zionism today, but Moser wants contemporary Jewish activists to 'feel less alone' by showing that debates about Zionism were once mainstream in Jewish communal life. [...] Moser's focus on individual lives is affecting. He makes no claims to be writing a definitive history and is aware of the Palestinian lives that shadow those of his protagonists but fall outside the scope of this study. There are nonetheless gaps," going on to cite the Satmar Hasidic movement, which is not mentioned in the book, as an example that anti-Zionism can "also be theological and conservative".

In the Los Angeles Review of Books, Rabbi Shaul Magid wrote, "To give voice to these stories is an act of fidelity to those who suffered at the hands of an emerging national project in a time of trauma."

In his review for The New York Times, Wesleyan University president Michael S. Roth criticized the book as painting "a fraught world in black and white" by overstating Israeli and Palestinian roles as "evil perpetrator and a virtuous victim", respectively, and said Moser "waves away" the historic presence of Jews in the region. Roth describes Moser's writing as "someone whose heart has been broken by his illusions about Jews, and who now wants to make amends by praising Palestinians". He argues that Moser contradicts his own opposition to Zionist claims to the Promised Land by adopting a "sentimental attachment to land-based nationalism" through adherence to settler-colonial theory, which Roth dismisses as "Europeans are bad and non-Europeans are good". Roth further criticizes Moser as not valuing dialogue and believing "with his dualism of good and evil he has achieved 'the correct understanding, which is that there is an occupier and a people under occupation.'" Roth concludes his review by writing that the overall character of Anti-Zionism "is not the mythic anti-rationalism of turn-of-the-century Vienna, but the siren sound of reductionist academic theory" and contends that Moser has merely "transposed the filial piety of his youth to new 'childish things'". In an interview on Piers Morgan Uncensored, Moser responded to the review by calling it "absolutely correct", saying that he does in fact believe the Israeli–Palestinian conflict is black and white and that Zionism as a project was racist from the very beginning.

In The New Yorker, writer Isaac Chotiner said the book "reminds Jewish Americans that another tradition is available, one that opposes Israel's existence rather than merely seeks to curb its worst impulses". However, Chotiner echoed Roth's conclusion, writing that Moser "merely inverted the triumphalist exceptionalism" of the "fairy tale" history he learned in his childhood. Chotiner continued that "Moser does not detail what a future resolution might entail" and has "no patience for complexity", saying "Moser's biggest failure, though, may be his inability to escape the very solipsism that he denounced in his Equator essay." Chotiner's review also accuses Moser of repeatedly misrepresenting historical sources and making "elementary factual errors" to sustain his thesis.
