= Race, State, and Armed Forces in Independence-Era Brazil =

Book by Hendrik Kraay published in 2002

Race, State, and Armed Forces in Independence-Era Brazil: Bahia 1790s to 1840s is a book by historian Hendrik Kraay published by Stanford University Press in 2002.

== Critical reception ==
Reviewed by Vitor Izecksohn in the Hispanic American Historical Review 86 (2006): 176-17.

Reviewed by Andrew J. Kirkendall, Andrew J. in the American Historical Review 110 (2005): 527-528.

Reviewed by Frank D. McCann in the Luso-Brazilian Review 47 (2010): 253-254.
