= Ken Graves and Eva Lipman =

American photographic duo

Ken Graves (June 27, 1942 – 2016) and Eva Lipman (born 1946), American photographers, worked as a collaborative duo for three decades. Their work included depicting "American social rites that mediate touch, particularly between men"—demolition derbies, boxing, wrestling, rodeo, military, and athletics events, proms and ballroom-dancing competitions. Graves and Lipman's joint work is held in the collection of the San Francisco Museum of Modern Art.

== Life and work ==
Graves was born in 1942 in Portland, Oregon. He died in 2016, aged 74. Lipman was born in 1946 in Děčín, Czechoslovakia. They met while photographing a ballroom dance competition in Ohio in 1986 and later married.

Their book Ballroom: Photographs (1989) contains "poignantly awkward studies of proms and ballroom-dancing competitions". In the mid-to-late 1990s, Graves taught at Pennsylvania State University and Lipman worked as a mobile therapist and social worker in rural Pennsylvania. Their "The Making of Men" series "documents military training sessions, demolition derbies, rodeos, and other customs that foment masculinity". Their book Derby, made at this time but not published until 2021, depicts competitive demolition derbies in and around Pennsylvania. According to a review in Hyperallergic:

"Graves and Lipman's black and white photos depict the events' hardscrabble drivers and mangled cars, but avoid the dangerous crashes that derbies are known for. Instead . . . the series exposes the surprisingly tender and at times erotically charged moments that happen before and after impact, when human and machine bodies come into close contact."

Becca Rothfeld, reviewing their book Restraint and Desire (2021) in The New Yorker, wrote that

"Touch is Graves and Lipman's great subject: they are fascinated by the way that its possibility animates even bodies in isolation . . . Military and athletic settings, and the fraught collisions they stage, are a recurrent fixation: restraint and desire are the central themes not only of Graves and Lipman's final book but also of an œuvre that returns over and over to the American social rites that mediate touch, particularly between men."

== Publications by Graves and Lipman ==
- Ballroom: Photographs. Seeing Double Series of Collaborative Books. Minneapolis, MN: Milkweed, 1989. ISBN 9780915943449.
- Derby. Oakland, CA: TBW, 2021. ISBN 978-1-942953-47-0.
- Restraint and Desire. Oakland, CA: TBW, 2021. ISBN 978-1-942953-46-3.

== Collections ==
Graves and Lipman's work is held in the following permanent collection:

- San Francisco Museum of Modern Art, San Francisco, CA: 8 prints (as of 28 December 2024)
- Smithsonian American Art Museum, Washington, D.C.: 1 print (as of 29 December 2024)
