= Pretty Modern =

2010 anthropology book

- Author: Alexander Edmonds
- Language: English
- Publisher: Duke University Press
- Publication date: December 2010
- Publication place: Brazil
- Awards: Winner, 2013 Eileen Basker Memorial Prize, presented by the Society for Medical Anthropology Honorable Mention, 2011 Sharon Stephens Book Prize, presented by the American Ethnological Association Honorable Mention, 2012 Roberto Reis Award, presented by BRASA Winner, Diana Forsythe Prize from the Society for the Anthropology of Work section, American Anthropological Association
- ISBN: 9786613251879

Pretty Modern: Beauty, Sex, and Plastic Surgery in Brazil is a book by anthropologist Alexander Edmonds published by Duke University Press in 2010. Edmonds examines plastic surgery as a social domain and uses it to explore the social, medical and psychological landscape and conflicts in modern-day Brazil. In this book, he seeks to answer the question "how did plastic surgery—a practice often associated with body hatred and alienation—take root in this city known for its glorious embrace of sensuality and pleasure?” He examine what constitutes a perfect Brazilian body and how the social and racial dynamic of Brazil affect this.

== Synopsis ==
The book contains three main sections, each addressing a particular aspect of plastic surgery culture in Brazil. Edmonds uses mainly interviews and observations of procedures as well as academic theories and publications. He interviews an array of people from various socio-economic backgrounds.

=== Part One: The Self-Esteem in Each Ego Awakens ===
This section of the book examines the roles of medicine and psychology in defining physical defects as an illness. It focuses on the career and philosophy of Dr. Ivo Pitanguy and his idea that everyone has "the right to beauty" and how the lines between what constitutes reconstructive and aesthetic surgery are blurred. He is an advocate for free cosmetic surgery in public hospitals and affordability and believes in the therapeutic rational and mental treatment of plastic surgery for mental suffering.

=== Part Two: Beautiful People ===
This part of the book addresses race in relation to beauty standards in Brazil. He examines how the idea of a racial democracy and mestiçagem (rainbow of colors) allows racism to be ignored in Brazilian culture. He explores how the ideal Brazilian body as a mixture of both black and white features but he also explores how this standard still perpetuates racism.

=== Part Three: Engineering the Erotic ===
This section explores gender and sexuality in relation to cosmetic surgery. He uses socio-biological theories to examine society's preference for youthful features. The widely held belief, by both surgeons and patients alike, that a maternal body being unattractive is addressed.

== Critical reception ==
Alexander Edmonds received good reviews on this book from how he addressed such a multi-faceted topic from all angles whilst maintaining respect for Brazilian culture. Hilda Lloréns wrote: "Pretty Modern is a masterful ethnography about the medicalization of beauty". The book was reviewed as a "beautifully written and intimate portrait of the private worlds of Brazilian socialites, middle-class madams, and their working-class maids, all of them striving,..., for beauty, sexual prowess, social recognition, and ultimately a modicum of self-love and self-esteem through cosmetic surgery" by Nancy Scheper-Hughes.

Review by Susan Besse in the Luso-Brazilian Review 50 (2013): 282–285.

Review by Donna Goldstein in American Ethnologist 39 (2012): 627-627.

Review by Nancy Scheper-Hughes in Current Anthropology 53 (2012):514-518.

== Awards ==
- Winner, 2013 Eileen Basker Memorial Prize, presented by the Society for Medical Anthropology
- Honorable Mention, 2011 Sharon Stephens Book Prize, presented by the American Ethnological Association
- Honorable Mention, 2012 Roberto Reis Award, presented by the Brazilian Studies Association (BRASA).
