= Equator (magazine) =

British political and literary magazine

- Categories: Politics, Culture, Art
- Founded: 2025
- First issue: October 2025
- Country: United Kingdom
- Based in: London
- Website: equator.org

Equator is a magazine of "politics, culture, and art" based in London. Founded in 2025, its publishers declared their fundamental motivation was their outrage at Israel's conduct following the October 7 attacks in the ensuing Gaza War. It aims to move beyond an Anglophone, Western-centric worldview, but instead publish a variety of cosmopolitan writing to "hold up a mirror to a global audience of readers and writers who don’t yet recognise themselves as belonging together."

Equator's first issue featured articles from such writers and scholars as Yuri Slezkine, Benjamin Moser, and Adom Getachew.
