= Left in Dark Times =

2008 book by Bernard-Henri Lévy

- Author: Bernard-Henri Levy
- Translator: Benjamin Moser
- Publication date: October 13, 2009
- ISBN: 9780812974720

Left in Dark Times: A Stand Against the New Barbarism is a 2008 book by Bernard-Henri Lévy, translated by Benjamin Moser.

== Premise ==
In this book, Lévy argues that in the wake of the failure of communism, the Western left has lost its ideals. It now fails to uphold universal ideas of justice, fails to sympathize with the oppressed, and has lost its commitment to truth. The left, according to Levy, has replaced those ideals with a pathological hatred of America, of Jews and Israel, and of freedom and liberty itself.

Levy also attempts to debunk what he identifies as the six chief claims of the contemporary European and American left. Liberalism is not merely the free market, it is also about democracy and human rights. Europe is about more than capitalism. America is not a fascist nation. Humanitarian intervention is humanitarian, not an imperialist ploy. Israel is not the cause of anti-Semitism. Islamism is homegrown, not caused by the West, and it threatens the West just as seriously as fascism once did.

The contemporary left, according to Levy, believes that any opponent of America or capitalism is good by definition. It is this reasoning that has led the left to support the dictatorship of Saddam Hussein; to turn the World Conference against Racism 2001 into a forum for anti-Semitic hatred, and the Sudanese government's attacks first on southern Sudan and now on the people of Darfur because that government is anti-American and no anti-American government is to be criticized.

== Genesis ==
Levy, who continues to consider himself a member of the "left", says that the book grew out of a phone call he received from French President Nicolas Sarkozy on January 23, 2007 asking for his support in the Presidential campaign. Levy responded that, "no matter how much I like and respect you, the Left is my family", to which Sarkozy replied, "These people who've spent 30 years telling you to go (expletive) yourself? Do you really believe what you're saying, that these people are your family?"

The phone call set Levy thinking, and he concluded that his abiding commitment to the left is rooted in his "adherence to the freedom and dignity of the individual, anti-fascism, anti-colonialism and 'the anti-totalitarianism that is the legacy of May '68'."

== Critique ==
The "New Barbarism" thesis has been criticised by Dag Tuastad, who argues that the New Barbarian writers tend to equate "terrorism" with "Islam" and "the Arab Mind", explaining the former as irrational, and therefore a threat from backward cultures. This neo Orientalist approach justifies continuation of colonialist violence in the Middle East and elsewhere It has also been argued by Paul Richards that the widely-perceived "barbarism" of rebel groups in resource-rich regions (like Sierra Leone), is not so "irrational" once you understand the distorted images of dominated people. The New Barbarism tends to blame the victims for their own condition, so justifying their hegemony.

== See also ==
- Euston Manifesto
