= Laurie Stone =

American writer and critic (born 1946)

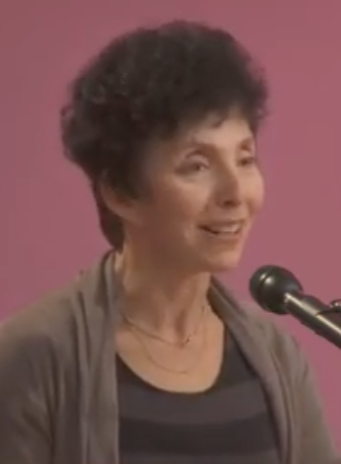
- Reading at the San Francisco Public Library in 2015
- Born: 1946 (age 79–80)
- Education: Barnard College; Columbia University (MA)
- Occupations: Writer, critic

Laurie Stone (born 1946) is an American writer and critic.

== Biography ==
Stone is a graduate of Barnard College (1968) and holds an MA from Columbia University (1969).

She taught at Hunter College and Queens College from 1969 to 1975.

She spent many years as a journalist at The Village Voice (1974–1999). She was also a theater critic for The Nation and critic-at-large for NPR's Fresh Air.

Her books include a story collection, My Life as an Animal (Northwestern University Press); essay collections, Laughing in the Dark (Ecco Press) and Streaming Now: Postcards from the Thing That Is Happening (Dottir Press); and a novel, Starting with Serge (Doubleday).

== Awards ==
In 1995, Stone won the Nona Balakian Citation for Excellence in Reviewing from the National Book Critics Circle.
