= Sophie Pinkham =

American journalist and writer

Sophie Pinkham is an American journalist and writer. She is a professor of practice in the Comparative Literature Department at Cornell University. She was a finalist for the Nona Balakian Citation for Excellence in Reviewing. She won the 2023 British Journalism Award for Travel Journalism.

Pinkham grew up in New York City. She graduated from Yale University, and Columbia University.

Pinkham's work has appeared in the Baffler, Dissent, Harper's, The Nation, n + 1, The Paris Review, The New Statesman, the New York Review of Books. and the New Yorker.

== Books ==
- Black Square: Adventures in the Post-Soviet World (W. W. Norton, 2016)
- The Oak and the Larch: A Forest History of Russia and Its Empires (2026)
