= Gideon Lewis-Kraus =

American journalist and author

Gideon Lewis-Kraus is an American journalist and author. He is a staff writer at The New Yorker.

He has written for The New York Times Magazine, Wired, and Harper's.

== Biography ==
Lewis-Kraus grew up in New Jersey. He graduated from the Pingry School in 1998. He graduated from Stanford University in 2002. Lewis-Kraus was the last research assistant to the philosopher Richard Rorty.

In 2006, Lewis-Kraus was a finalist for the Nona Balakian Citation for Excellence in Reviewing of the National Book Critics Circle Awards.

In 2012, Lewis-Kraus authored the book A Sense of Direction: Pilgrimage for the Restless and the Hopeful.

In 2020, Lewis-Kraus joined The New Yorker as a staff writer.
