= Why This World =

Biography of Clarice Lispector

Why This World: A Biography of Clarice Lispector
- Author: Benjamin Moser
- Genre: Biography
- Published: 2009
- Publisher: Oxford University Press
- Pages: 479
- ISBN: 978-0-19-538556-4

Why This World: A Biography of Clarice Lispector is a book by Benjamin Moser published by Oxford University Press in 2009. Benjamin Moser details the majority of Clarice Lispector's life and then discusses the connections between her life and her work.

== Synopsis ==
Moser discusses how Clarice Lispector's work reflects her life, from her birth in Ukraine to her literary success in Brazil. He does this by citing her own texts, letters, other scholarly work and what few interviews there are of her. Moser goes into great detail on the connections that can be made between Lispector's writing and her life. Moser uses letters written to and from Lispector, Lispector's own sisters, Elisa Lispector's autobiography, interviews with Lispector and Lispector's own writings.

== Critical reception ==
Critical reception for Why This World was largely positive. Common praise for the book centered around Moser addressing many of Lispector's texts that were untranslated or not as widely read outside of Brazil, which one reviewer for Shofar stated brought more of her work to a wider audience. Reviewing the book for the Luso-Brazilian Review, Earl E. Fitz remarked on the book's handling of Lispector's texts that were lesser known outside of Brazil, criticizing it on how the texts were interpreted.

== Awards ==
Why This World was a 2009 National Book Critics Circle Award Biography finalist.
