= Jo Livingstone =

British literary critic

Jo Livingstone is a British literary critic who publishes primarily in American venues. They are the former staff writer for culture at The New Republic and one of the eight writers of a letter to the New York Times complaining of anti-trans bias. As of 2023, they publish the blog The Stopgap with Daniel M. Lavery.

== Early life and education ==
Livingstone received a B.A. in English language and literature from the University of Oxford in 2010 and a PhD from New York University in medieval literature in 2015.

== Career ==
Livingstone wrote cultural criticism for The New Republic between 2017 and 2022. They have also written for Bookforum. They are one of the eight writers of a 2023 letter to the New York Times complaining of anti-trans bias that was signed by over 1000 contributors to the Times. As of 2023, they publish the blog The Stopgap with Daniel M. Lavery. They are a visiting assistant professor in Graduate Communications Design at Pratt Institute in Brooklyn, New York.

== Awards and recognition ==
Livingstone received the 2017 Newswomen's Club of New York's Front Page Award for opinion writing and the 2020 National Book Critics' Circle's Nona Balakian Citation for Excellence in Reviewing.
