= Jeremy J. Shapiro =

American philosopher

Jeremy J. Shapiro

Jeremy J. Shapiro (born 1940) is an American academic, educational performance artist, translator, and activist. He is professor emeritus at Fielding Graduate University and works in the area of critical social theory with emphasis on the social and cultural effects of information technology and systems, social change, and the aesthetics of music. His main intellectual products and innovations include

- the concept of the universal semiotic of technological experience: a language of images, symbols, and technologies that integrates the conscious and unconscious, the public and the private, in advanced industrial civilization;
- zen socialism, an approach to socialism that focuses on the need for simultaneous change at the personal, interpersonal and social levels, blends activism and non-attachment, and aims at the minimally, rather than maximally rational society;
- mindful inquiry in social research (developed together with Valerie Malhotra Bentz), which integrates phenomenology, hermeneutics, critical theory, and Buddhism as a framework for research (Mindful Inquiry in Social Research, Sage Publications, 1998, 2d edition 2025);
- metaphorical metadata, amplifying standard analytical and conceptual classification schemes through classification based on metaphors, symbols, and analogies;
- an expanded conception of information literacy as a liberal art (developed together with Shelley K. Hughes); and
- the notion of the streaming body (developed together with Linda F. Crafts);
- the notion that the philosopher and musicologist Theodor W. Adorno's model of how to listen to modern music based on his analysis of the individuated nature of a modern musical work is a model for how to be an individuated person in contemporary society.

In addition he works in the following areas: the sociology of digital simulation and of on-line environments; the experience of multiple identities and multiple realities among users of information and communication technologies; and enhancing the experience of music listening. He has worked as a computer programmer/analyst, as a director of academic computing and networking, and as a computer journalist. He has been corresponding editor for the journals Theory and Society and Zeitschrift für kritische Theorie and also writes cultural criticism and reviews. At Fielding Graduate University he served as senior consultant for academic information projects.

== Education ==
After graduating from the High School of Music and Art in New York City, where he studied bassoon and conducting, he studied at Harvard with Robert Paul Wolff and Barrington Moore Jr.; at the Institute for Social Research in Frankfurt am Main with Herbert Marcuse, Theodor W. Adorno, and Jürgen Habermas; at Brandeis University with Maurice Stein and Kurt H. Wolff; and at the City University of New York with Abbe Mowshowitz. He received his Ph.D. from Brandeis in 1976.

== Translations ==
Through his translations he introduced Habermas's work (Toward a Rational Society and Knowledge and Human Interests) and Marcuse's early work (Negations) to the English-speaking world.

== Selected publications ==
- "Herbert Marcuse (1898-1979) ". Telos 41 (Fall 1979). New York: Telos Press.
- Valerie Malhotra Bentz and Jeremy J. Shapiro, Mindful Inquiry in Social Research (Thousand Oaks: Sage Publications, 1998)
- John Downing, Rob Fasano, Pat Friedland, Michael F. McCullough, Terry Mizrahi, Jeremy J. Shapiro (eds.), Computers for Social Change and Community Organizing (New York: The Haworth Press, 1991).
- "One-Dimensionality: The Universal Semiotic of Technological Experience," (1970) in: Paul Breines (ed.), Critical Interruptions: New Left Perspectives on Herbert Marcuse (New York: Herder and Herder.)
- "The Slime of History: embeddedness in nature and critical theory," in John O'Neill (ed.), On Critical Theory (New York: Seabury, 1976)
- "My Funeral Music", in Carolyn Bereznak Kenny, ed., Listening, Playing, Creating: Essays on the Power of Sound (Albany: SUNY Press, 1995)
- "Evaluating the Internet: a social progress matrix", (co-author with Shelley K. Hughes) in Proceedings of INET '96 (Montreal: Internet Society, 1996)
- Information Literacy as a Liberal Art: Enlightenment proposals for a new curriculum"
- "Interdisciplinary Knowledge Integration and Intellectual Creativity" [Original title: "Metaphorical and Symbolic Metadata for Interdisciplinary Knowledge Integration and Intellectual Creativity"], in M. J. Lopez-Huertas (ed.), Challenges in Knowledge Representation and Organization for the 21st Century: Integration of Knowledge Across Boundaries (Proceedings of the Seventh International ISKO Conference, Granada, 10–13 July 2002), (Würzburg: Ergon-Verlag, 2002), pp. 100–106.
- "The Case of the Inflammatory E-mail: Building Culture and Community in OnLine Academic Environments," (co-author with Shelley K. Hughes), in Kjell Rudestam and Judith Schoenholtz-Read (eds.), Handbook of Online Learning: Innovations in Higher Education and Corporate Training (Thousand Oaks: SAGE Publications, 2002). pp. 91–124.
- "Digitale Simulation: Theoretische und geschichtliche Grundlagen", in Zeitschrift für kritische Theorie 17 (2003).
- "The Streaming Body as the Site of Telecommunications Convergence," (co-author with Linda F. Crafts), in Kristóf Nyíri (ed.), Integration and Ubiquity: Towards a Philosophy of Telecommunications Convergence. Vienna: Passagen Verlag, 2008.
- "Adorno´s Praxis of Individuation Through Music Listening", in Zeitschrift für kritische Theorie, XVII:32-33 (2011), and Música em Perspectiva, Vol. 3, No 2 (2010).

== See also ==
- American philosophy
- List of American philosophers
