= George Scialabba =

American literary critic

George Scialabba (born 1948) is an American book critic and retired building manager at Harvard University. His reviews have appeared in Agni, The Boston Globe, Dissent, the Virginia Quarterly Review, The Nation, The American Prospect, Commonweal, and many other publications. In 1991, Scialabba received the first annual Nona Balakian Citation for Excellence in Reviewing from the National Book Critics Circle.

== Life ==
Scialabba was born and raised in East Boston to working-class Italian-American parents. In his younger days, he was a member of Opus Dei. He is an alumnus of Harvard University (AB, 1969) and Columbia University (MA, 1972). After working as a substitute teacher and a social worker (Massachusetts Department of Public Welfare, 1974–1980), he was a building manager at Harvard from 1980 until 2015. In acknowledgement of his retirement, Cambridge City council declared an official "George Scialabba Day".

== Writing ==
Scialabba has been writing freelance book reviews since 1980. In 2015, after retiring from Harvard, he began writing a books column for The Baffler.

A collection of his reviews appeared in his first book, Divided Mind, published in 2006 by Arrowsmith Press. Four subsequent collections of his essays have been published by poet William Corbett's publishing house, Pressed Wafer: What Are Intellectuals Good For? (2009), The Modern Predicament (2011), For the Republic (2013), and Low Dishonest Decades: Essays & Reviews, 1980-2015.

The Modern Predicament was chosen by James Wood in The New Yorker's year-end roundup of the best books of the year:

he has an enviably wide range: he writes superbly here about D. H. Lawrence, the philosopher Charles Taylor, about Michel Foucault, Philip Rieff, Kierkegaard, and many others. Scialabba was a member of Opus Dei, and subsequently lost his faith under the pressure of ordinary, secular education (at Harvard, in the late sixties and early seventies). This background equips him to be a shrewd, learned, undogmatic guide to contemporary debates about theology and postmodernity.

His 2018 book How To Be Depressed bookends four decades of his therapists' notes with two short essays and an interview reflecting on his experience with depression. In a review for Commonweal, Matthew Sitman praises the book for both its portrayal of the futility of depression, but also for the compassion the author presents for fellow sufferers: "Scialabba refuses to view such compassion only in private, personal terms, as if it could be discussed apart from politics and public policy."

== Bibliography ==
- Divided Mind (2006)
- What Are Intellectuals Good For? (2009)
- The Modern Predicament (2011)
- For the Republic: Political Essays (2013)
- Low Dishonest Decades (2016)
- Slouching Toward Utopia (2018)
- How to Be Depressed (2018)
- "What were we thinking?". Commonweal. 150 (1): 20–25. January 2023.
- Only a Voice: Essays. London: Verso. 2023.
- The Sealed Envelope (2026)
