= Becca Rothfeld =

American essayist (born 1991)

- Born: October 8, 1991 (age 34)
- Education: Dartmouth College (BA); University of Cambridge (MPhil)
- Occupations: Writer; critic

Becca Rothfeld (born October 8, 1991) is an American literary critic and essayist. She won the Nona Balakian Citation for Excellence in Reviewing and the Silvers-Dudley Prize.

== Life ==
She attended Dartmouth College, graduating with a B.A. degree. She received her MPhil degree from University of Cambridge. Rothfeld later pursued a Ph.D. in Philosophy at Harvard University, but as of 2024 has not completed a dissertation.

In March 2023, she was hired by The Washington Post as its non-fiction book critic.

In 2024, Rothfeld revealed on her blog that she has been undergoing treatment for early-stage thyroid cancer. As of 2026, she no longer has thyroid cancer.

On February 4, 2026, Rothfeld was laid off by The Washington Post when it reduced its staff by one-third and eliminated the newspaper's books and sports sections. On February 10, 2026, The New Yorker announced that Rothfeld would be joining them as a staff writer later that month.

She is Jewish.

== Works ==
- Rothfeld, Becca (April 2, 2024). All Things Are Too Small. New York: Metropolitan Books. ISBN 978-1-250-84991-5.
