= Philip Rieff =

American sociologist & cultural critic (1922–2006)

- Born: December 15, 1922; Chicago, Illinois, U.S.
- Died: July 1, 2006 (aged 83); Philadelphia, Pennsylvania, U.S.
- Occupations: Sociologist, cultural critic
- Known for: Freud: The Mind of the Moralist
- Awards: Guggenheim Fellowship (1969)

Academic background
- Education: University of Chicago (BA 1946; MA 1947; PhD 1954)

Academic work
- Discipline: Sociology
- Sub-discipline: Psychoanalysis; Cultural criticism
- Institutions: Brandeis University (1952–1959); University of California, Berkeley (1959–1961); University of Pennsylvania (1961–1992)

Philip Rieff (December 15, 1922 – July 1, 2006) was an American sociologist and cultural critic, best known for his early-career work on Sigmund Freud and later criticisms of modern culture. He taught sociology at the University of Pennsylvania from 1961 until 1992 after briefer positions at the University of Chicago, Brandeis University, and the University of California, Berkeley. He was the author of a number of books on Sigmund Freud and his legacy, including Freud: The Mind of the Moralist (1959) and The Triumph of the Therapeutic: Uses of Faith after Freud (1966).

As a graduate instructor at the University of Chicago, he married his undergraduate student Susan Sontag after 10 days of courtship in 1950. The marriage lasted eight years. Sontag and Rieff had a son together, David Rieff, a writer and the editor of his mother's personal journals.

== Early life and education ==
Philip Rieff was born on December 15, 1922 in Chicago, Illinois, the son of Lithuanian Jewish refugees. He attended the University of Chicago for both undergraduate and graduate study, earning a BA in 1946, an MA in 1947, and a PhD in political science in 1954. Rieff wrote his dissertation, Freud’s Contribution to Political Philosophy, under Leo Strauss. He first intended to be a sportswriter, specifically a baseball journalist, and his studies were interrupted for service in the US Army Air Force, where he was an attaché to an Air Force general.

== Career ==
Rieff taught at the University of Chicago until moving to Boston to teach at Brandeis University in 1952, then to the University of California, Berkeley in 1959 after a one-year fellowship at Stanford University. He settled for the remainder of his career at the University of Pennsylvania in 1961. There, he became University Professor of Sociology and then the named chair the Benjamin Franklin Professor; he retired emeritus in 1992. He was awarded a Guggenheim Fellowship in 1969.

Rieff's early career was defined by his analyses and critiques of Sigmund Freud and psychoanalysis, particularly the books Freud: The Mind of the Moralist in 1959 and The Triumph of the Therapeutic: Uses of Faith After Freud in 1966. In addition to these, in the same period he edited a ten-volume edition of Freud's collected works that was published by Collier Books in 1963.

Freud was immediately well-received. Harvard psychologist Henry Murray's review in the American Sociological Review declared it "remarkably subtle and substantial" and the "product of profound analytic thought," while Berkeley sociologist and psychoanalyst Neil Smelser recalled "the work seemed to be on everybody's lips, and was generally believed to be the best and most important critical reading of Freud yet." Rieff's moralistic interpretation of Freud was contrasted with psychoanalysts's scientific interpretations, Lionel Trilling's tragic interpretation, and Herbert Marcuse and Norman O. Brown's radical political interpretations. As the title suggested, Rieff viewed Freud as first of all a moralist, but an ironic moralist of an unusual kind facing a crisis of prior moral cultures: facing the impossibility of maintaining substantive, positive moral communities on past bases of faith in religious or scientific grounding. Rieff credited Freud with developing a new, faithless therapeutic mentality to meet this crisis, one that recast questions of good and evil into questions of healthy and sick.

The Triumph of the Therapeutic continued Rieff's exploration of therapeutic mentalities and morality, focusing critically on three claimed moral successors and critics of Freud: Carl Jung, Wilhelm Reich, and D. H. Lawrence. In contrast to Freud's faithless moralism, Rieff presented each of these successors as would-be creators of new faiths and new communities of moral commitment to those new faiths – but also as failures in their attempts.

Near the end of his life in 2003, Rieff's work was the topic of a special issue of the Journal of Classical Sociology: vol. 3 no. 3, "The significance of Philip Rieff."

== Personal life and death ==
As a graduate instructor at the University of Chicago, Rieff met Susan Sontag as a seventeen-year-old undergraduate auditing one of his classes, and they married after a 10-day romance in 1950. She later wrote of him that "he was the first person with whom she could ever really talk." Sontag and Rieff had a son together born 1952, David Rieff, a writer and the editor of his mother's personal journals. The marriage lasted eight years until divorce in 1959, after a year in which Rieff had taken a fellowship at Stanford University while Sontag had traveled to Paris.

In 1963, Rieff married Alison Douglas Knox (1933–2011), an Oxford graduate and professor of philosophy and later a lawyer (JD 1977), and they remained married for over forty years until his death.

Rieff died of heart failure on July 1, 2006 in Philadelphia, Pennsylvania. His wife Alison survived him; she died December 12, 2011. Rieff's correspondence is held at the University of Pennsylvania's Kislak Center for Special Collections.

== Selected works ==
=== Articles ===
- Rieff, Philip (April 1951). "The Meaning of History and Religion in Freud's Thought". The Journal of Religion. 31 (2): 114–131. JSTOR 1197638.
- Rieff, Philip (July 1953). "Aesthetic Functions in Modern Politics". World Politics. 5 (4): 478–502. doi:10.2307/2009180. JSTOR 2009180.
- Rieff, Philip (Winter 1954). "George Orwell and the Post-Liberal Imagination". The Kenyon Review. 16 (1): 49–70. JSTOR 4333463.
- Rieff, Philip (April 1956). "The Origins of Freud's Political Psychology". Journal of the History of Ideas. 17 (2): 235–249. doi:10.2307/2707744. JSTOR 2707744.
- Rieff, Philip (Fall 1972). "Fellow Teachers". Salmagundi (20): 5–85. JSTOR 40546710.
- Rieff, Philip (Fall–Winter 1982). "VII A Last Word: The Impossible Culture: Wilde As A Modern Prophet". Salmagundi (58/59): 406–426. JSTOR 40547581.
- Rieff, Philip (Spring–Summer 1987). "For the Last Time Psychology: Thoughts on the Therapeutic Twenty Years After". Salmagundi (74/75): 101–117. JSTOR 40547954.

=== Books ===
- Freud: The Mind of the Moralist. Viking, 1959.
  - Third edition: University of Chicago Press, 1979. ISBN 978-0-226-71639-8
- Collected Papers of Sigmund Freud (ed.). Translated by C. J. M. Hubback. Collier Books, 1963.
- The Triumph of the Therapeutic. Harper & Row, 1966.
  - 40th Anniversary edition: ISI Books, 2006. ISBN 978-1-932236-80-4
- (edited) On Intellectuals: Theoretical Studies, Case Studies. Doubleday, 1969. LCCN 69-12225
- Fellow Teachers. Harper & Row, 1973. ISBN 0-06-013554-9
- The Feeling Intellect. University of Chicago Press, 1990. ISBN 978-0-226-71641-1
- Sacred Order/Social Order Trilogy, in 3 volumes:
  - My Life Among the Deathworks. University of Virginia Press, 2006. ISBN 978-0-81-3925-16-5
  - The Crisis of the Officer Class. University of Virginia Press, 2008. ISBN 978-0-81-3926-76-6
  - The Jew of Culture. University of Virginia Press, 2008. ISBN 978-0-81-3927-06-0
- Charisma. Pantheon, 2007.
  - Vintage paperback edition: Vintage, 2008. ISBN 978-0-307-27753-4

== Sources ==
- Aeschliman, M.D. (17 July 2006). "The Aesthetics of Moloch". National Review. Vol. 58, no. 13. pp. 41–42.
- Fine, Gary Alan; Manning, Philip (2003). "Preserving Philip Rieff: The Reputation of a Fellow Teacher". Journal of Classical Sociology. 3 (3): 227–233. doi:10.1177/1468795X03003300.
- Glenn, David (November 11, 2005). "Prophet of the 'Anti-Culture'". Chronicle of Higher Education.
- Hawtree, Christopher (August 1, 2006). "Obituary: Philip Rieff". The Guardian.
- King, Richard H. (June 1976). "From Creeds to Therapies: Philip Rieff's Work in Perspective". Reviews in American History. 4 (2): 291–296. doi:10.2307/2701568. JSTOR 2701568.
- Kleinschmidt, Hans J. (Fall 1966). "Beyond Philip Rieff: The Triumph of Sigmund Freud". American Imago. 23 (3): 244–256. JSTOR 26302408.
- Lapsley, James N. (January 1967). "Review: The Triumph of the Therapeutic: Uses of Faith after Freud, by Philip Rieff". Theology Today. 23 (4): 573. doi:10.1177/0040573667023004.
- Manning, Philip (November 2003). "Philip Rieff's Moral Vision of Sociology From Positive to Negative Communities – and Back?". Journal of Classical Sociology. 3 (3): 235–246. doi:10.1177/1468795X030033002.
- McFadden, Robert D. (July 4, 2006). "Philip Rieff, Sociologist and Author on Freud, Dies at 83". The New York Times. Archived from the original on March 25, 2014.
- Murray, Henry A. (April 1960). "Reviewed Work: Freud: The Mind of the Moralist. by Philip Rieff". American Sociological Review. 25 (2): 299–300. doi:10.2307/2092656. JSTOR 2092656.
- Scialabba, George (2007). "The Curse of Modernity". Boston Review. 32 (4).
- Smelser, Neil J. (September 2007). "Philip Rieff: The Mind of a Dualist". Social Psychology Quarterly. 70 (3): 221–229. JSTOR 20141785.
