= Quest (journal) =

- Discipline: Philosophy
- Language: English, French

Publication details
- History: 1987–present
- Publisher: Afrika-Studiecentrum, Leiden (Netherlands)
- Frequency: biannually

Standard abbreviations
- ISO 4: Quest

Indexing
- ISSN: 1011-226X

Links
- Journal homepage; Online access

Quest: An African Journal of Philosophy is an academic journal publishing philosophical discussions on problems that arise out of the radical transformations Africa and Africans are undergoing. Quest includes materials on both current subjects related to Africa, and subjects of general philosophical interest, serving an international public of professional philosophers and intellectuals in other disciplines with philosophical interest. Quest publishes original articles written in either English or French, each with a summary in the other language.
