= Alfred Lorenzer =

Alfred Lorenzer (April 8, 1922, Ulm – June 26, 2002, Perugia) was a German psychoanalyst and sociologist regarded as a pioneer of interdisciplinary psychoanalysis. He integrated the psychological, the biological and the sociological dimension in the science of man, especially with regard to psychoanalytic theory.
