= Ruth Franklin =

American literary critic

- Born: Baltimore, Maryland, United States
- Education: B.A., English Language and Literature, 1995, Columbia University; M.A., comparative literature, Harvard University
- Occupation: Author
- Awards: National Book Critics Circle Award for Biography
- Website: ruthfranklin.net

Ruth Franklin is an American literary critic. She is a former editor at The New Republic and an Adjunct professor at New York University's Arthur L. Carter Journalism Institute. Her first biography, Shirley Jackson: A Rather Haunted Life, won the National Book Critics Circle Award for Biography and was named a New York Times Notable Book of 2016.

== Early life and education ==
Growing up, Franklin attended the Park School of Baltimore. During her senior year of high school, Franklin interned at a newspaper where she experienced sexual harassment from older reporters. After graduating, Franklin enrolled in Columbia University for her Bachelor of Arts degree in English Language and Literature. She later graduated from Harvard University with a Master's degree in Comparative Literature.

== Career ==
In 1999, Franklin began her literary critiquing career at The New Republic. While working as a senior critic, she published her first book titled A Thousand Darknesses: Lies and Truth in Holocaust Fiction in 2010. In Franklin's book A Thousand Darknesses, she critiqued the assumption that Holocaust survivor testimonies were completely factual and should be taken as such. "Her study questions the privileging of autobiography over fiction and endorses imagination as a form of truth-telling," wrote Heidi E. Bollinger. Franklin instead argued that Holocaust literature was better understood through fiction. As a result, she was the co-recipient of the 2012 Roger Shattuck Prize for Criticism alongside David Yaffe and named a finalist for the Sami Rohr Prize.

The following year, she was the recipient of a Guggenheim Fellowship and began writing her second book, Shirley Jackson: A Rather Haunted Life. She spent six years conducting research for her book, including sorting through Jackson's archives at the Library of Congress. Upon its publication, she won the 2017 National Book Critics Circle Award for Biography and was named a finalist for the PEN/Jacqueline Bograd Weld Award for Biography. The book was also named a New York Times Notable Book of 2016 and one of Time magazine's top nonfiction book of the year. The following year, she received the 2017 Phi Beta Kappa Society Book Award and Plutarch Award.

In 2025, Franklin published The Many Lives of Anne Frank, a biography of the German-born diarist and Holocaust victim Anne Frank. In it, she highlights Frank's diary, published as The Diary of a Young Girl, as "the deliberate and carefully edited work of a maturing artist", and analyzes how Frank's legacy has come to overshadow her life and identity. On March 28, 2026, Franklin participated in a SWAN Day program hosted by Jan Lisa Huttner honoring the life of Anne Frank; later that year, on June 12, Franklin participated in another program, hosted by iSWANs, honoring Anne Frank's 97th birthday.

== Bibliography ==
=== Books ===
- A Thousand Darknesses: Lies and Truth in Holocaust Fiction (2010)
- Shirley Jackson: A Rather Haunted Life (2016)
- The Many Lives of Anne Frank (2025)

=== Essays, reporting and other contributions ===
- Foreword to Shirley Jackson: A Companion (2021)
- "Into the void : a cautionary tale about science raises cautionary questions about fiction". The Critics. Books. The New Yorker. 97 (28): 73–76. September 13, 2021. (Note: Reviews, inter alia, Benjamin Labatut's When we cease to understand the world. Online version is titled "A cautionary tale about science raises uncomfortable questions about fiction".)

———————
