= Luiz Alfredo Garcia-Roza =

Brazilian professor and novelist (1936–2020)

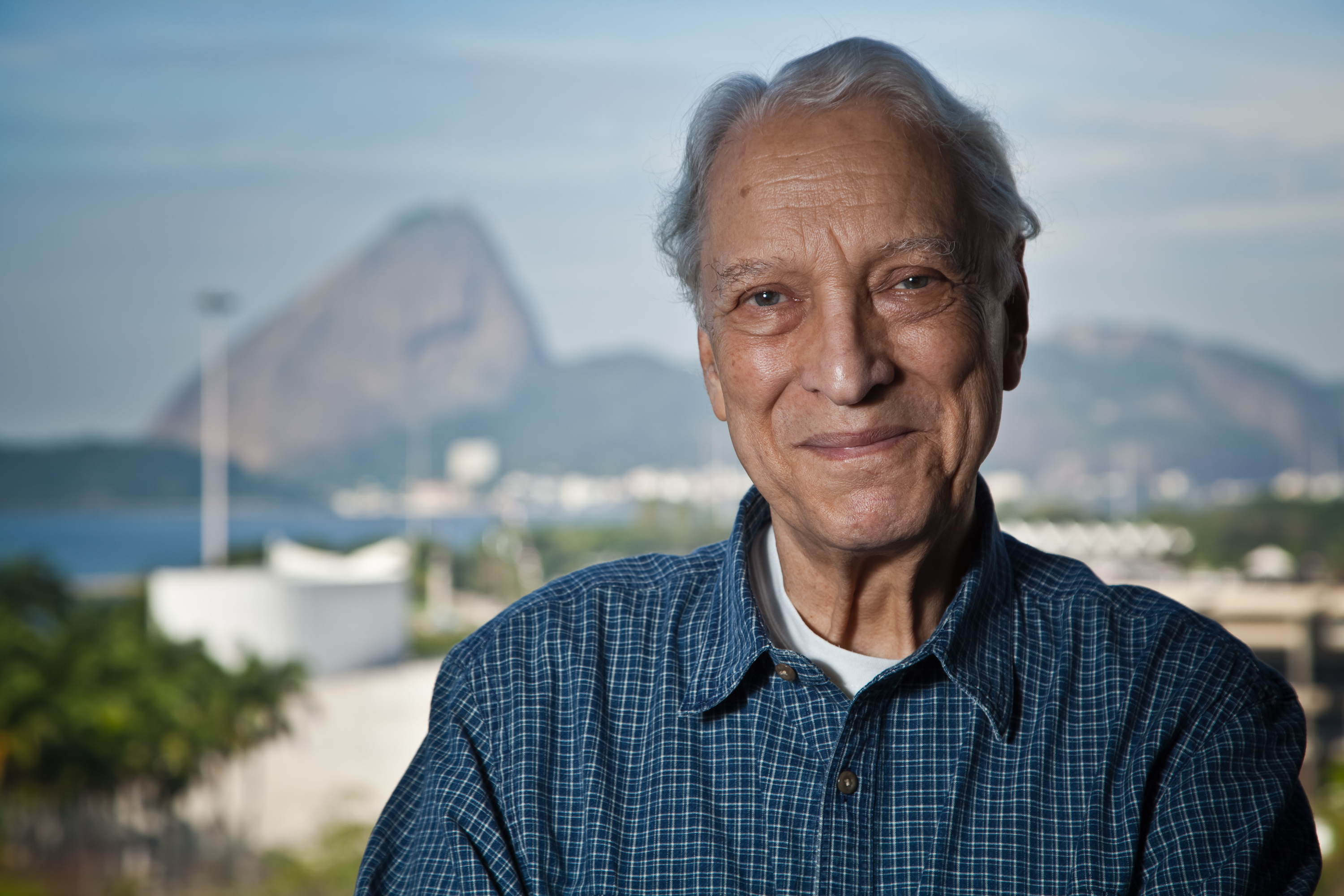

Luiz Alfredo Garcia-Roza (16 September 1936 – April 16, 2020) was a Brazilian professor and novelist, born in Rio de Janeiro. As an academic he wrote philosophy and psychology textbooks, and taught at the Federal University of Rio de Janeiro, where he founded the first postdoctorate in psychoanalytic theory in Brazil.

After retiring from academia he became known as a novelist and shared the Prêmio Jabuti for Literature in 1997. He is known for his Detective fiction, in particular his Inspector Espinosa Mystery series. He had little knowledge of crime or police-work before he began writing. Some of his works have been translated into English.

Garcia-Roza died on April 16, 2020, in Rio de Janeiro.

== Works in English ==
=== Inspector Espinosa mysteries ===
- The Silence of the Rain (2003) ISBN 0312421184 [Original: O silêncio da chuva, 1996]
- December Heat (2004) ISBN 978-0312423438 [Original: Achados e perdidos, 1998]
- Southwesterly Wind (2004) ISBN 978-0312424541 [Original: Vento sudoeste, 1999]
- A Window in Copacabana (2006) ISBN 978-0312425661 [Original: Uma Janela em Copacabana, 2001]
- Pursuit (2006) ISBN 978-0805074390 [Original: Perseguido, 2003]
- Blackout (2009) ISBN 978-0312428860 [Original: Espinosa Sem Saida, 2006]
- Alone in the Crowd (2010) ISBN 978-0312429881 [Original: Na Multidão, 2007]

The character of Espinosa has been brought to the screen twice. First, in the eight episode 2015 TV series Romance Policial: Espinosa starring Domingos Montagner, and the 2020 film version of The Silence of the Rain starring Lázaro Ramos.

== Other books in Series ==
- Céu de Origamis (2009) ISBN 978-8-535-91567-9 [Portuguese]
- Freud e o Inconsciente (2009) ISBN 978-85-7110-003-9 [Portuguese]
- L'Etrange Cas du Dr Nesse (2010) ISBN 978-2-742-76459-4 [French]
- Fantasma (2012) ISBN 978-8-535-92102-1 [Portuguese]
- Nuit d’orage à Copacabana (2015) ISBN 978-2-330-03906-6 [French]
