= Benjamin Moser =

American writer and translator (born 1976)

- Moser in 2026
- Born: September 14, 1976 (age 50); Houston, Texas, U.S.
- Education: Brown University (BA); Utrecht University (MA, PhD)
- Occupations: Writer; translator
- Partner: Arthur Japin
- Relatives: Laura Moser (sister)
- Writing career
- Notable work: Sontag: Her Life and Work (2019)
- Notable awards: Pulitzer Prize for Biography (2020)

Benjamin Moser (born September 14, 1976) is an American writer and translator. He received the Pulitzer Prize in 2020 for his biography of Susan Sontag, titled Sontag: Her Life and Work.

== Biography ==
Moser was born in Houston, Texas. His grandfather arrived in Houston in 1942 as a Jewish refugee from Nazi Germany. Moser attended St. John's School and graduated from Brown University with a degree in history. He came to Brown with the intention of studying Chinese, but soon switched to Portuguese, a choice that would have great influence on his subsequent work. He worked briefly in publishing and was living in New York City when he met his partner, Dutch novelist Arthur Japin. Moser then moved to several different cities in Europe before eventually settling in the Netherlands where he earned his MA and PhD from Utrecht University. He is the brother of author and progressive political activist Laura Moser.

== Career ==
=== Writing ===
Moser’s first book, Why This World, was published in 2009, and was widely recognized as introducing the Brazilian writer Clarice Lispector, up until that point largely unknown in the United States, to an international public.

In 2016, Moser published a book of essays in Portuguese called Autoimperialismo: três ensaios sobre o Brasil (Autoimperialism: Three Essays on Brazil). The book was dedicated to Ocupe Estelita, an urban preservation movement in Recife, and proceeds from the book were donated to the group. Moser describes the constant violence of Brazilians upon other Brazilians as a form of "autoimperialism". The book was noted for its harsh criticism of Oscar Niemeyer. The book received positive reviews and was a bestseller in Brazil.

In 2013, he was named the authorized biographer of the American writer Susan Sontag. In 2019, he published Sontag: Her Life and Work, which won the Pulitzer Prize for Biography in 2020. The citation called it "[a] authoritatively constructed work told with pathos and grace, that captures the writer's genius and humanity alongside her addictions, sexual ambiguities and volatile enthusiasms. The book received critical acclaim from such publications as Artforum, the Times Literary Supplement, and The New Republic. In February 2023, it was announced that Kristen Stewart would be playing Sontag in a film adaptation of the book directed by Kirsten Johnson.

In 2022, Moser published The Upside-Down World, a personal account of his moving to the Netherlands when he was young, and his encounters with the Dutch artists of the age of Rembrandt and Vermeer. The book received positive reviews in the Washington Post and The Wall Street Journal.

In September 2026, Doubleday published Moser's Anti-Zionism: A Jewish History, a subject he had previously written about in The New York Times and The Washington Post. In it, Moser documents and advocates anti-Zionism from a Jewish perspective. Moser did some of the research and writing of this book while he was a 2025-2026 Cullman Center Fellow at the New York Public Library.

=== Translation ===
Following his publication of Why This World, Moser was named Series Editor at New Directions Publishing for a new translation of the complete works of Clarice Lispector. The ongoing project, which now stretches to eleven volumes, was carried out with a team of translators, with Moser contributing several translations of his own.

The series has been recognized for its contribution toward the increased readership of Lispector. "The revival of the hypnotic Clarice Lispector has been one of the true literary events of the 21st century," wrote Parul Sehgal in The New York Times.

For his work as biographer, editor, and translator of Lispector, Moser was awarded the Prize for Cultural Diplomacy from the Brazilian Ministry of Foreign Relations in 2016.

On October 7, 2021, he was elected to one of the twenty chairs reserved for foreigners at the Brazilian Academy of Letters, a lifelong position.

In addition to translations from Portuguese, Moser has also published translations from French.

=== Journalism ===
Moser served as New Books Columnist for Harper's Magazine from 2009 to 2011, and was a Bookends columnist at The New York Times Book Review.

Moser became a contributing writer at The Nation magazine in 2021.

== Personal life ==
Moser has lived in France, the Netherlands, and elsewhere. He currently lives in the Netherlands and in France. His partner is the Dutch novelist Arthur Japin.

== Awards and honors ==
- 2009 National Books Critics Circle Award (Biography) finalist for Why This World
- 2014 Nona Balakian Citation for Excellence in Reviewing finalist
- 2016 Prêmio Itamaraty de Diplomacia Cultural
- 2017 Guggenheim Fellowship
- 2020 Pulitzer Prize for Biography or Autobiography for Sontag: Her Life and Work
- 2021 Sócio Correspondente of the Brazilian Academy of Letters

== Bibliography ==
=== Books ===
- Why This World: A Biography of Clarice Lispector, Oxford University Press (2009)/Haus Publishing Limited, ISBN 978-0-19-538556-4 (US), 978-1906598426 (UK)
- Autoimperialismo: três ensaios sobre o Brasil, Planeta, 2016
- Sontag: Her Life and Work, Ecco 2019.
- Frans Hals op de tweesprong, Arbeiderspers, 2020. ("Frans Hals at the Crossroads")
- The Upside-Down World: Meetings with the Dutch Masters, Liveright, 2023
- Anti-Zionism: A Jewish History, Doubleday, 2026

=== Translations ===
- Luiz Alfredo Garcia-Roza:
  - The Silence of the Rain: An Inspector Espinosa Mystery. Macmillan (2003) ISBN 978-0-3124-2118-2
  - Southwesterly Wind: An Inspector Espinosa Mystery, trans. Benjamin Moser. (2004) ISBN 978-0-3124-2454-1
  - December Heat: An Inspector Espinosa Mystery, trans. Benjamin Moser. Macmillan (2004) ISBN 978-0-3124-2343-8
  - Pursuit: An Inspector Espinosa Mystery, trans. Benjamin Moser. Macmillan (2006) ISBN 978-0-8050-7439-0
- Bernard-Henri Lévy, Left in Dark Times: A Stand Against the New Barbarism. Random House Publishing Group (2008) ISBN 978-1-5883-6757-0
- Clarice Lispector:
  - The Hour of the Star. New Directions (2011) ISBN 978-0-8112-1949-5
  - The Chandelier, co-translated with Magdalena Edwards. New Directions (2018) ISBN 978-0-8112-2313-3
  - The Woman Who Killed the Fish. New Directions (2022). ISBN 978-0-8112-2960-9
  - The Apple in the Dark. New Directions (2023). ISBN 978-0-8112-2675-2
