= The Party of Eros =

1972 book

- Title page for The Party of Eros: Radical Social Thought and the Realm of Freedom (1972)
- Author: Richard King
- Publisher: University of North Carolina Press
- Publication date: 1972
- Pages: 227

The Party of Eros: Radical Social Thought and the Realm of Freedom is a book-length contemporaneous intellectual history of the New Left written by Richard King and published by University of North Carolina Press in 1972. It analyzes the intellectual development of figures including Norman O. Brown, Paul Goodman, Herbert Marcuse, Dwight Macdonald, and Wilhelm Reich.

== Bibliography ==
- Bien, Joseph (1972). "Review of The Party of Eros: Radical Social Thought and the Realm of Freedom". The Annals of the American Academy of Political and Social Science. 404: 302–303. doi:10.1177/000271627240400174. ISSN 0002-7162. JSTOR 1038734. S2CID 144948067.
- Fowler, Robert Booth (1973). "Review of The Party of Eros: Radical Social Thought and the Realm of Freedom; Political Hysteria in America: The Democratic Capacity for Repression; Radical Libertarianism: A New Political Alternative". The American Political Science Review. 67 (3): 991–992. doi:10.2307/1958648. ISSN 0003-0554. JSTOR 1958648.
- Hook, Sidney (1973). "The Politics of Irresponsibility". The Virginia Quarterly Review. 49 (2): 274–282. ISSN 0042-675X. JSTOR 26435545.
- King, Peter J. (1975). "Review of Good Tidings: The Belief in Progress from Darwin to Marcuse; The Party of Eros: Radical Social Thought and the Realm of Freedom". The American Historical Review. 80 (1): 70–72. doi:10.2307/1859061. ISSN 0002-8762. JSTOR 1859061.
- Paul, Sherman (1973). "Review of The Party of Eros: Radical Social Thought and the Realm of Freedom". The Journal of English and Germanic Philology. 72 (2): 252–255. ISSN 0363-6941. JSTOR 27706366.
- Susman, Warren I. (1972). "Review of The Party of Eros: Radical Social Thought and the Realm of Freedom". The Journal of American History. 59 (3): 776–777. doi:10.2307/1900759. ISSN 0021-8723. JSTOR 1900759.
- Veysey, Laurence (1973). "Ways of Writing Contemporary History". Reviews in American History. 1 (1): 151–157. doi:10.2307/2701700. ISSN 0048-7511. JSTOR 2701700.
