= Luso-Brazilian Review =

- Discipline: literature, Latin American studies, history, social sciences
- Language: English, Portuguese
- Edited by: Kathryn Bishop-Sánchez, Rebecca J. Atencio

Publication details
- History: 1964–present
- Publisher: University of Wisconsin Press (United States)
- Frequency: Biannually

Standard abbreviations
- ISO 4: Luso-Braz. Rev.

Indexing
- ISSN: 0024-7413 (print); 1548-9957 (web)
- LCCN: 2004-212182
- JSTOR: 00247413
- OCLC no.: 51321212

Links
- Journal homepage; Content at Project MUSE

The Luso-Brazilian Review is a peer-reviewed academic journal which publishes interdisciplinary scholarship on the Portuguese, Brazilian, and Lusophone African cultures, with an emphasis on literature, history, and the social sciences. Each issue of the Luso-Brazilian Review contains articles and book reviews, written in either English or Portuguese.

The Luso-Brazilian Review was founded in 1964 at the University of Wisconsin-Madison. The founding editor was Alberto Machado da Rosa.

== Indexing ==
The journal is indexed and abstracted in the United States: History and Life, Behavioural Abstracts, Hispanic American Periodicals Index, MLA International Bibliography of Books and Articles on the Modern Languages and Literatures, Multicultural Education Abstracts, Periodicals Index Online, Scopus, Social Planning, Policy and Development Abstracts, and Sociology of Education Abstracts.
