= Berlin Childhood around 1900 =

Text by Walter Benjamin, 1932 to 1938

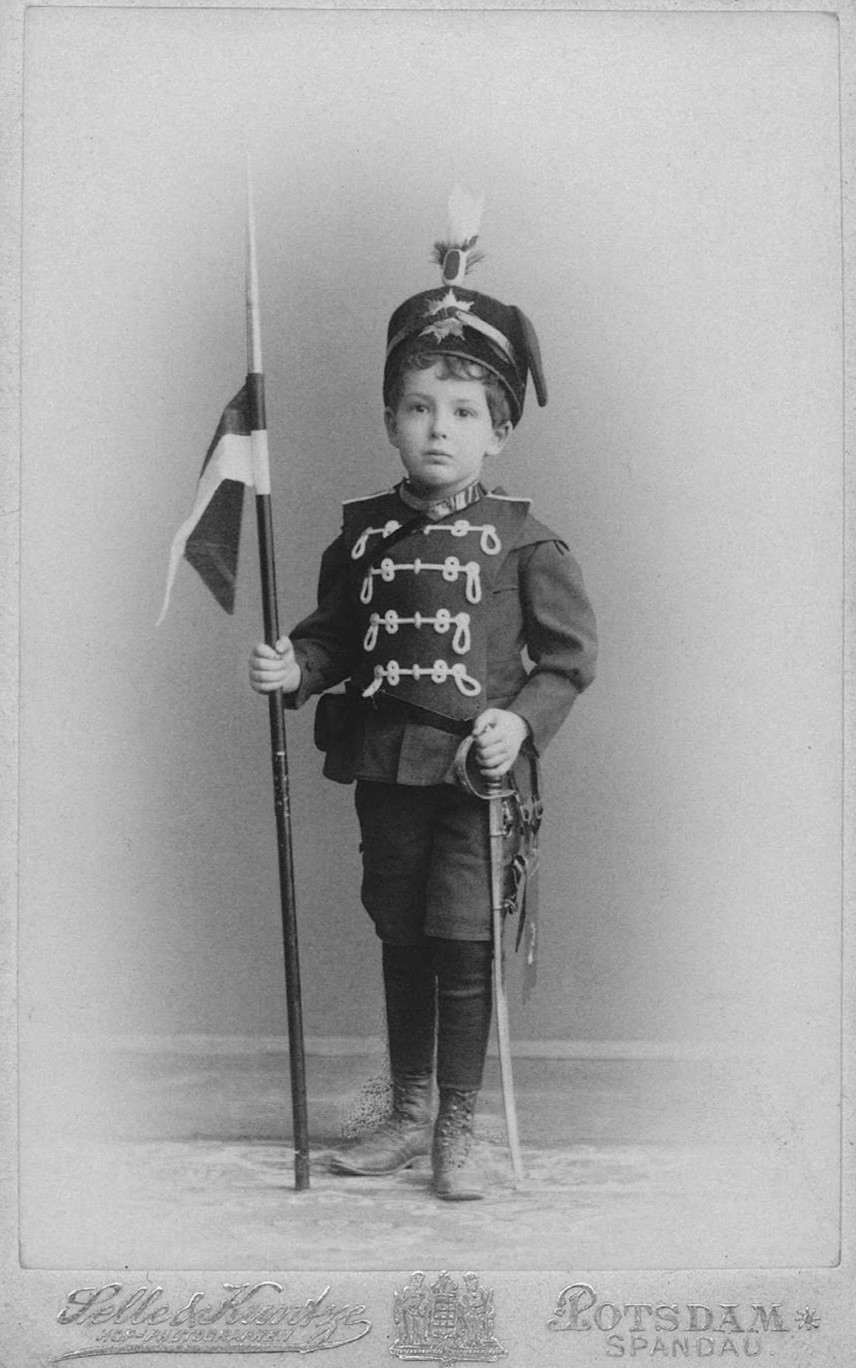
- Walter Benjamin in the uniform of a Prussian hussar; between 1897 and 1902
- Author: Walter Benjamin
- Original title: Berliner Kindheit um neunzehnhundert
- Language: German
- Genre: Autobiography Critical theory Cultural history
- Publisher: Suhrkamp Verlag
- Publication date: 1932

Berlin Childhood around 1900 (German: Berliner Kindheit um neunzehnhundert) is a work by Walter Benjamin (1892–1940) written between 1932 and 1938. The text consists of thirty fragments that have features of autobiography, prose poetry, and socio-critical historical study. Benjamin recalls various places, objects, and events in Berlin, creating, in his words, "images that reflect the perception of the big city as a child from a bourgeois family." The book is an artistic record of the historical and social upheavals of the first half of the twentieth century: the First World War, the collapse of the Weimar Republic, the destruction of the old bourgeois world with the rise of National Socialism. The presentation of the cultural topography of the city at the turn of the century is combined with a poetic presentation of the theory of memory and reflections on individual and collective history in modernity. The identification of the main motifs is complicated by the fragmentary form and the lack of a coherent narrative. The commentators highlight the following themes: the relationship between autobiography and historical research, the city as a mythical labyrinth, the spatialization of memory and threshold spaces, visual images and photography, the child's mimetic experience and the semiotics of resemblance, the disintegration of the subject, and the problem of identity and self-identification.

"Berlin Childhood" was written under conditions of personal crisis, professional failure, harassment by the authorities, and then forced emigration from Nazi Germany. After the first edition (1932), entitled "Berlin Chronicle," Benjamin continued to work on his memoirs until 1938. During his lifetime, individual texts were printed in periodicals; between 1950 and 2000, several editions of the book appeared, none of which is definitive. "Berlin Childhood" has long had a reputation as a stylistically polished collection of memoirs in the spirit of Marcel Proust, popular with the general reader but less accepted theoretically. Academic interest in the work has intensified with contemporary cultural memory studies and visual culture, of which Benjamin was a pioneer.

== History of writing and publishing ==
In a family of assimilated Jews who belonged to the upper echelons of the Berlin bourgeoisie, Walter Benjamin spent his childhood. In the second half of the 19th century, Berlin, which had become an imperial metropolis, experienced a period of unprecedented industrial, demographic, and infrastructural growth. Accelerated modernization turned the city into a concentration of social and cultural contradictions, with the wealth and luxury of bourgeois and aristocratic districts contrasting with the poverty of working-class neighborhoods. Department stores sprang up in the center of Berlin, mass advertising and industrial goods were sold. The proletarian slums remained real ghettos with their own customs and dialects. The spirit of calculation in the mentality of the citizens was combined with militaristic values, and the monuments of neoclassicism with eclectic new architecture. The image of the capital was completed by the pompous buildings of King Wilhelm II. Benjamin's family lived in various wealthy neighborhoods in West Berlin: near the Tiergarten, then in Charlottenburg and Grunewald. His childhood was marked by prosperity as well as security and isolation in a bourgeois world where the cult of things reigned.

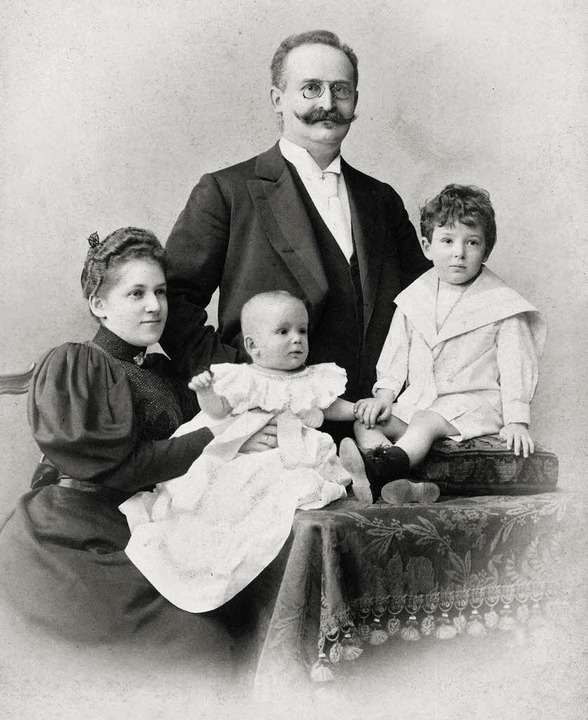
The Benjamin family in 1896: Emil and Paulina Benjamin with sons George and Walter (right)

In the fall of 1931, the magazine Die literarische Welt invited Benjamin to write a free series of personal stories about Berlin; the series was to be called Berlin Chronicle. Benjamin signed the contract in October. Although the planned quarterly publication of the short essays could not be realized, they laid the foundation for a literary representation of childhood memories. The small form followed the experiments of One-Way Streets (published in 1928). The author called it a "broken book". It reflected the lived experience of oppression, exile, and homelessness. 1932 was a particularly dark year in Benjamin's life. He experienced divorce from his wife, material hardship and professional failure, and life-threatening discrimination from the rising fascism. Benjamin's friend Gershom Scholem called this period a time of "crises and turning points":

The first drafts of The Berlin Chronicle date from January to February 1932, and the author first mentioned the work in a letter to Scholem dated February 28, in which he wrote about notes on "the history of my relationship with Berlin". Later, in a letter to Scholem in September 1932, Benjamin claimed that the genre he had chosen was more marketable and was determined by his difficult financial situation in the face of losing his job before embarking on a new major project. The bulk of the text was written in Ibiza between April and July 1932. This first draft, a manuscript of 24 fragments, was later sent to Sholem in Jerusalem. In July, Benjamin was in Nice, where he contemplated suicide and even wrote a will. These circumstances are thought to have influenced his work, although, according to Germanist Uwe Steiner, the text does not confirm this. After Nice, Benjamin moved to Poveromo (Italy), where from August to November he revised the Chronicle, based on 52 pages of original material and some fragments published in A One-Way Street. The title "Berlin Childhood around 1900" appeared in a letter to Scholem in September 1932 and then in several letters to Theodor Adorno. In April 1933, he completed a second version (the Giesen version). Scholem estimates that about two-fifths of the text of the Berlin Chronicle was incorporated into Berlin Childhood. Between December 1932 and August 1934, 25 fragments were published in the German newspapers Frankfurter Zeitung (12 fragments in the spring of 1933) and Vossische Zeitung. Benjamin had hoped for full publication in the Frankfurter Zeitung, but his plans were thwarted by the Nazis' rise to power. In February 1933 he admitted in a letter to Scholem that he had been paid a "ridiculous pittance" and suspended publication; a month later Benjamin emigrated to France. After August 1934, he was no longer allowed to publish in Germany; until 1935, the essays were printed anonymously or under the pseudonyms "Detlev Holz" and "C. Conrad. In July–August 1938, 7 final fragments appeared in Thomas Mann's émigré journal Maß und Wert (Zurich).

Benjamin repeatedly tried to get the fragments published as a single book in Germany and Switzerland, but failed. He continued his work for several years, rearranging the order of the texts, removing old elements and adding new ones, and writing a small but important preface. Between the summer of 1932 and the spring of 1938, the author prepared at least 4 different manuscript revisions. He originally planned to keep 30 fragments, then 34 and 36. Among the new fragments are "Loggias", (Note: The fragment is put in the first place instead of "The Otter".) "The Moon" (both texts written in the summer of 1933 during a second visit to Ibiza), "Imperial Panorama", "Butterfly Hunt", "Winter Morning", and "Winter Evening". By 1938, Benjamin had radically reduced and revised the text, returning to the original plan of 30 fragments; 9 autobiographical fragments were removed entirely. The text became more concise and compact, with an emphasis on imagery. The manuscript contained two additional fragments not listed in the table of contents. According to commentator Howard Island, these circumstances indicate hesitation on the part of the author and perhaps that the 1938 edition was not final.

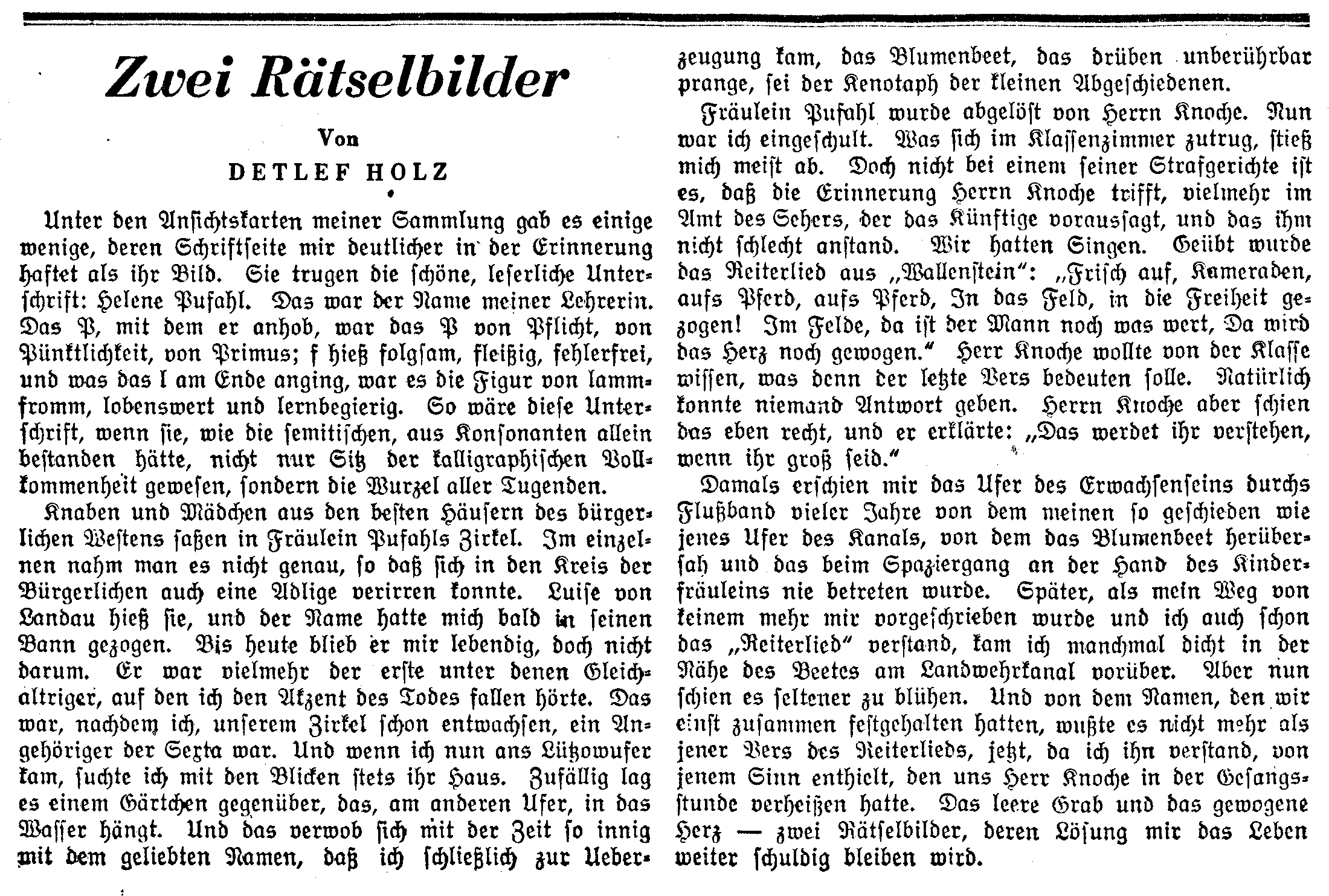
Fragment of "Two Enigmas," published in the Vossische Zeitung under a pseudonym. 1933

The editors of Benjamin's collected works, Rolf Tiedemann and Hermann Schweppenhäuser, distinguish 5 main versions of the text:

1. the Felicitas Exemplar manuscript, begun in the fall of 1932;
2. the Stefan Exemplar of late 1932, with a dedication to their son Stefan;
3. the Adorno-Rexroth expanded edition (1932-1934);
4. the Author's Copy (Note: The title page was signed by Benjamin as "Handexemplar komplett".) — "Fassung letzter Hand" (1938);
5. the Giesen edition (1932-1933).

In 1950, Adorno published Berliner Kindheit, after independently determining the number and order of the fragments. The edition contained 37 texts based on newspaper articles, typewritten manuscripts, and individual handwritten fragments. The book was not a success. In 1955, an edition of 34 fragments, also edited by Adorno, was published. The 59-page manuscript of The Berlin Chronicle was first edited and published by Scholem in 1970. On the basis of the first two publications, an expanded edition (Adorno-Rexroth version, 41 fragments, edited by Tilman Rexroth) of Volume IV of the Collected Works (1972) was compiled, which included Felicitas-Example. These versions were neither authorized by Benjamin. The author's copy of the 1938 edition, "Fassung letzter Hand", was discovered by Giorgio Agamben in 1981 in the Bibliothèque Nationale de France and published in 1987. The manuscript of the closely related 1938 version, the Giesen edition, the first complete version of Berlin Childhood in which the order of the fragments was determined by the author, belonged to the lawyer Martin Domke from Bertolt Brecht's circle. It was kept at the University of Giessen, found in 1987, and published by Suhrkamp Verlag in 2000. In English, Berlin Childhood appeared in 2002 in Volume 3 of Benjamin's Selected Works (Harvard University Press), with a separate edition in 2006. The 1972 edition has influenced the reception of the text. Modern commentators note the special importance of the "final edition" with a preface and author's table of contents. The version is heavily abridged and lacks texts that for thirty years were considered an integral part of Berliner Kindheit. In 2011, commentator Anja Lemke concluded that, in light of new publications, a historical-critical analysis of the author's editions remains a matter for the future.

== General characteristics ==
In the early 21st century, "Berlin Childhood" is one of Benjamin's most popular among the masses; the work is often seen as an autobiography, a sophisticated and elegant collection of childhood memories. Early critics (Note: Peter Sondi, Gershom Scholem, Anna Stüsi.) referred to the book as prose poetry. According to the renowned literary scholar and literary historian Peter Sondhi, Berliner Kindheit belongs to "the most beautiful poetic prose of our time"; Scholem wrote that the text is "guided by a poetic-philosophical concept". The free sequence of the fragments favors the choice of certain themes or motifs, making it difficult to recognize the coherence of the text.

Commentators, beginning with Adorno and Scholem, have often seen the text in the context of the author's exile, fascism, and related social upheavals. In the preface to the final edition, Benjamin wrote: "I realized (Note: Year 1932.) that I would soon have to say goodbye to the city in which I was born for a long time, perhaps a very long time. The shadow of impending fascism looms over the images of the memoirs, and the texts are imbued with the author's horror at the rise of Nazism. Sholem wrote that Berlin Childhood was written under the sign of suicide and the coming of National Socialism. The book intertwines motifs of loss and mourning, sadness and melancholy; the vision of early 20th-century Berlin as a dying and disappearing world coincided with the dark premonitions of Benjamin's generation. In the memoirs, one sees "symptoms of the disease" of Weimar culture destroying itself between two historical catastrophes. In the children's pictures one finds premonitions of the coming destruction of the bourgeois world by National Socialism. In the epilogue to the first edition, Adorno wrote:

...the historical archetypes that Benjamin wanted to derive in this essay from a socio-pragmatic and philosophical genesis suddenly appear in the "Berlin" book, imbued with the immediacy of memories and the grief for the irretrievable, the lost forever, which for the author became an allegory of the sunset of his own life. For in the pictures, which are even too close, there is neither an idyllic nor a contemplative mood. They are overshadowed by the shadow of Hitler's Reich... The air above the Berlin neighborhoods, which in Benjamin's description seem about to come to life, is saturated with death. The condemned man looks into these places and sees that they too are condemned.

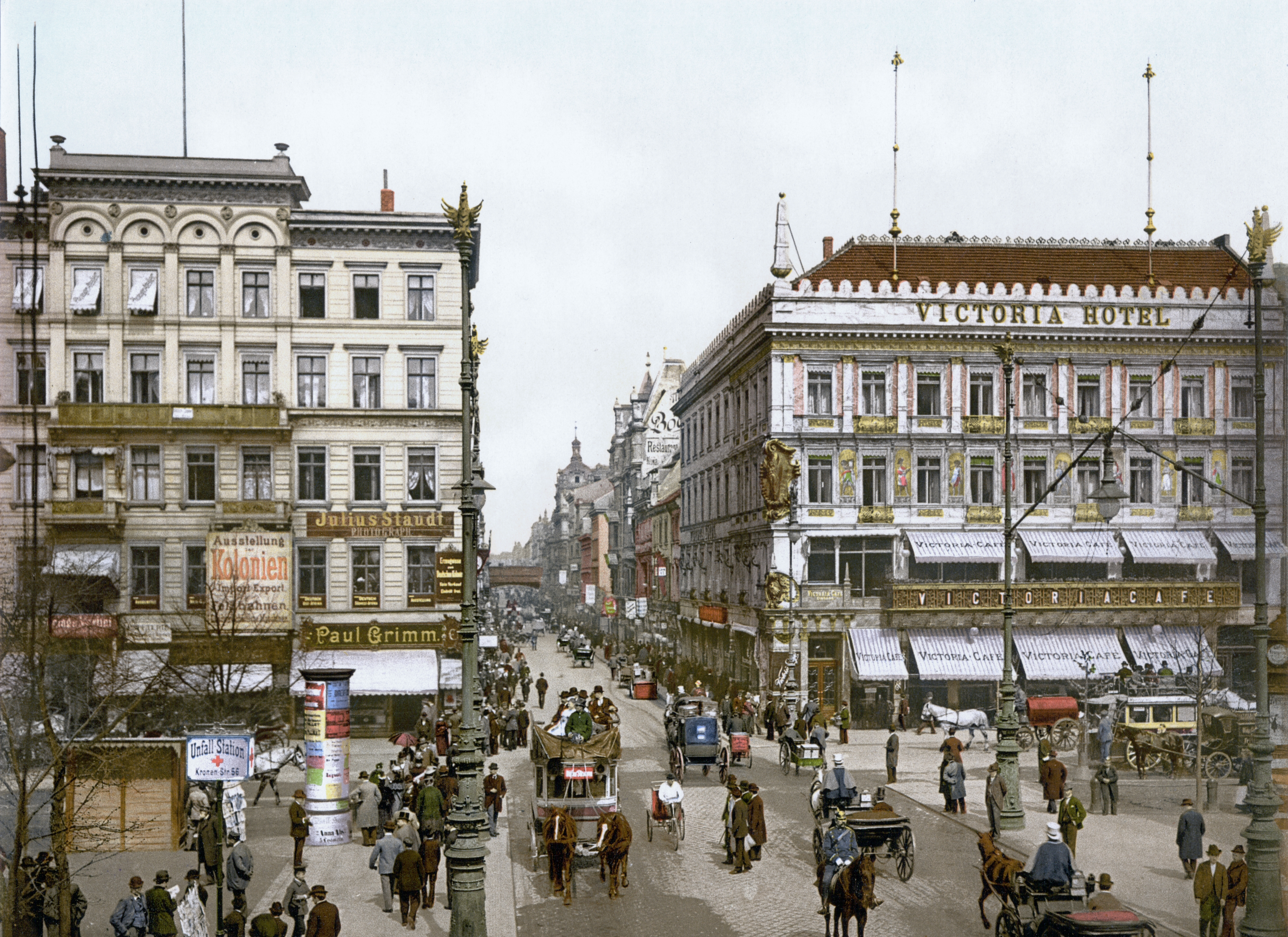
Downtown Berlin (Unter den Linden Boulevard), around 1900

The book has long been associated with M. Proust's epic "In Search of Lost Time" and defined, in contrast to the French author, as "the search for a lost future" or "memories of the future". The revision of Proust followed from Benjamin's philosophy of history, later deployed in "Theses on the Philosophy of History", and included a critique of historicism, a reinterpretation of historical materialism, and the idea of messianism. In Benjamin's metaphysics of time, memory actualizes the vanished world, and the materialist dimension of the adult corrects the child's view. Memories reveal the complex connections and ruptures of a particular historical moment and project its implications into the future, linking general and political issues with highly personal reflections. Benjamin called memoirs "the autographs of our century," adding that they "contain the most accurate portrait I can give of myself" (Letter to Scholem, 1933). The Germanist Bernd Witte noted that the thinker placed the historian-materialist's gaze within the unconscious sensations of childhood. The encounter between past and present generates meanings with a slight nostalgia, fills memories with a melancholy of absence and finitude; in its uniqueness and transgression, personal experience is inseparable from cultural history. The recourse to rhetorical figures questions the narratives of development and completion; literary space turns out to be not only a place of construction, but also of fragmentation and dispersion.

"Berlin Childhood" contains reflections on the ways memory's work is represented, and later an exposition of memory theory. The literary and cultural researcher Nicholas Petes has noted that memory is not so much a reflection of autobiographical experience as a structural and structuring element of the text. Benjamin considered modern memory, or the memory of modernity, rather than the ahistorical concept of memory. The concept of memory is based on the dialectic of remembering and forgetting, irretrievable loss and salvation of the past. The spatial model of memory is particularly emphasized. As defined by the historian Karl Schlögel, Benjamin is a "thinker of spatial imagination", deeply dependent on place; "Berlin Childhood" is "a masterpiece of topographical hermeneutics". According to Lemke, Benjamin creates a series of spatial memory schemes in order to "graphically mark the sphere of my life —Bios— on a map". Nevertheless, the Berlin texts are not reducible to a topographical structure of memory.

Many commentators have detected in the text a model of critical historical inquiry. As Adorno has noted, "Berlin Childhood":

is one of Benjamin's works on the early modern period, the history of which he worked on for the last fifteen years of his life, and represents the writer's attempt to contrast something personal with the mass of material he had already collected for his essay on Paris arcades project.

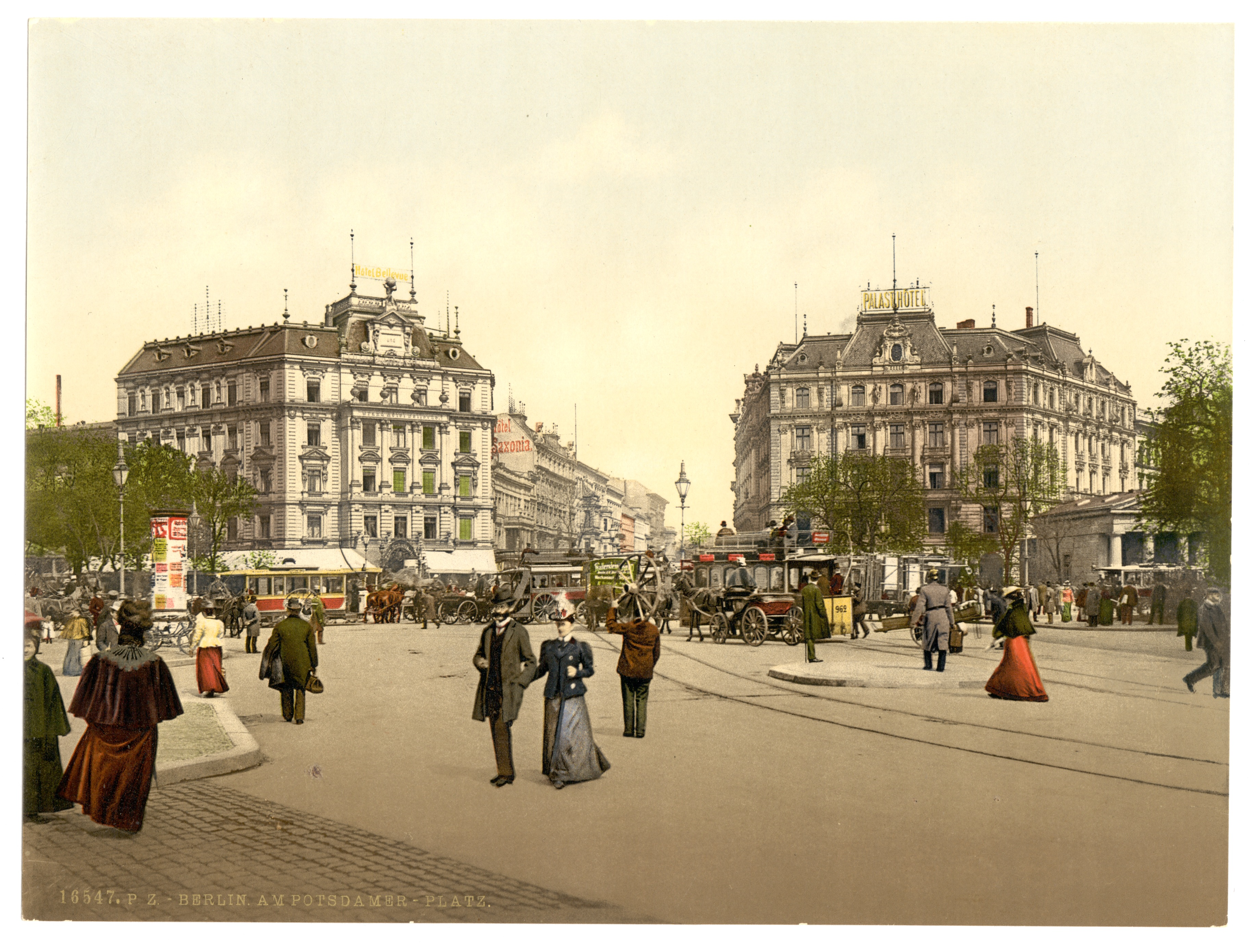
Potsdamer Platz, around 1900

One related issue is the relationship between historical research and literary autobiography. The attention to the history of the nineteenth century, to the "prehistory" (Urgeschichte) of modernity brings Berlin Childhood closer to the essay "Paris, Capital of the 19th Century" in historical and in theoretical terms. The book is seen as a methodological experiment for "Passages": the reconstruction of childhood experience and the materialist depiction of the era serve to represent the mythological space of Berlin. Benjamin saw the tasks of the two texts differently. In correspondence, he emphasized that the reflection of the prehistory of modernity in the child's gaze is fundamentally different from the signs imprinted on the "map of history." According to sociologist and cultural researcher Graham Gilloch, the attempt to turn autobiography into history ended in failure because personal memories proved to be an inadequate model for socio-historical analysis (which the author himself recognized).

In the preface to the later edition, Benjamin wrote that he wanted to "recreate images that reflect the perception of the big city by a child from a bourgeois family. In the texts created in the "moment of remembering," the era of childhood is intertwined with the space of the late 19th century city. The title refers to the connection and unity of time, space and the perceived world. Despite the title, "the cultural topography of a vanished city" tells us little about the architectural, cultural, or social characteristics of Berlin. The city is presented as a world of different interconnected spaces, spatial signs and allegories that belong to certain places (e.g. prostitutes and beggars). The children's images are characterized by a sense of powerlessness; the city looks as an enchanted, almost magical world in the child's perception. Benjamin unfolds a tangled dialectic of myth, archaism, and awakening; the city is a puzzle, a universe of hidden meanings to be deciphered. While Lemke links the representation of the spatial structure of the city to the graphic structure of memory, Gilloch draws attention to the experience of the modern metropolis, the connections between the metropolitan environment, individual memory and collective history — between memory and city, time and space. Benjamin's questions are: how does the city alter memory? how does memory shape the urban whole? is it possible to write a critical history of an epoch through individual narrative?

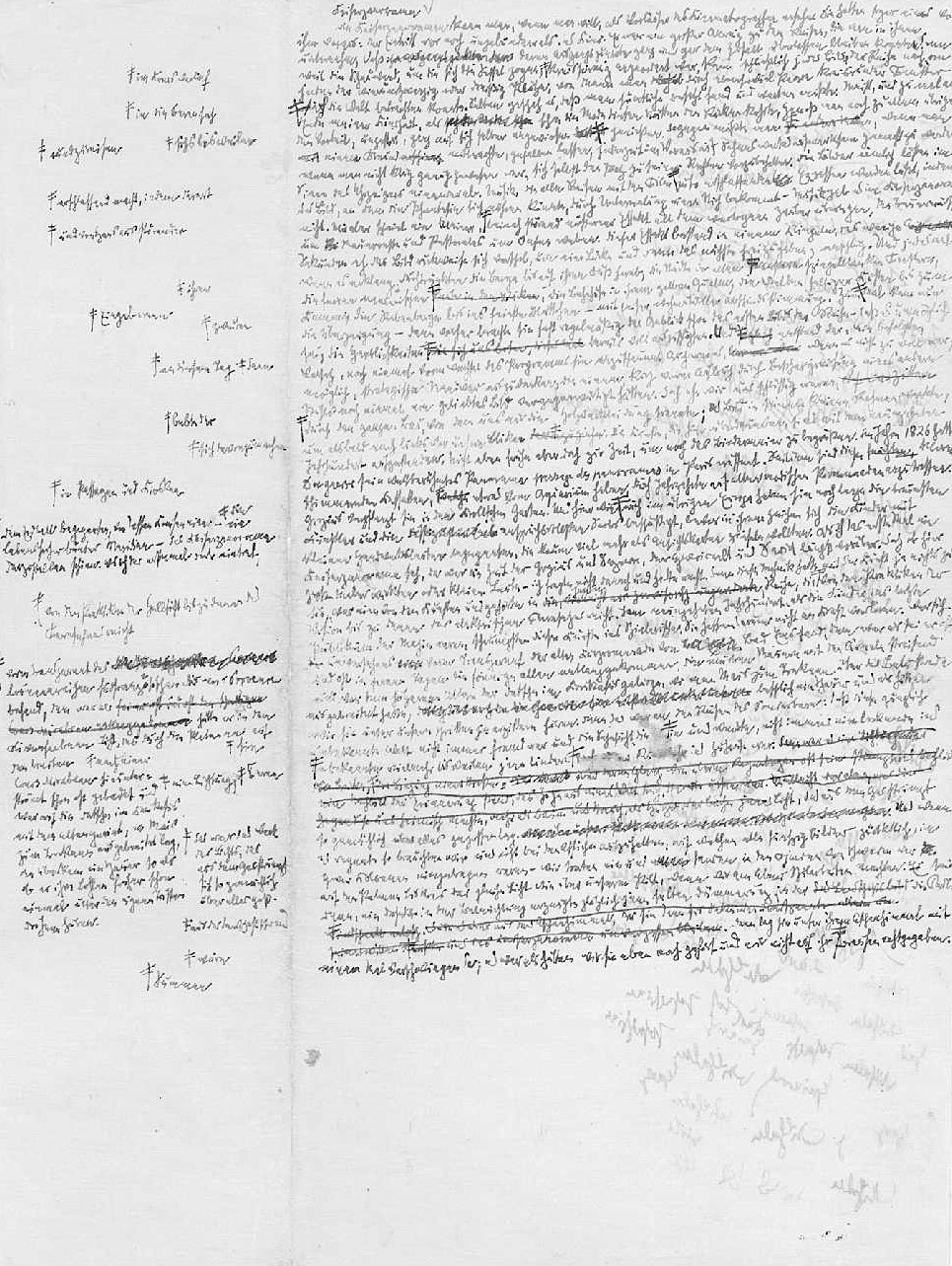
Manuscript of the fragment "Imperial Panorama". Autumn, 1932

The Berlin memoirs were also seen as the artistic embodiment of Benjamin's aporetic aesthetic theories ("A Brief History of Photography" and "The Work of Art in the Age of its Technical Reproducibility"), his concepts of similarity and mimetic capacity ("The Doctrine of Similarity" and "On Mimetic Capacity"). According to Werner Hamacher's famous summary, Benjamin's memoirs were the driving force as well as the unfolding, extrapolation and realization of the program of his theoretical work, even its radicalization. The book was linked to the author's long-standing interest in the image of the child, childhood, and the problem of experience. Benjamin's enthusiasm for the revolutionary and emancipatory aspect of the new cultural forms (cinema and photography) was combined with melancholy, a longing for the lost world of "authenticity," for the loss of historical and aesthetic experience. On the one hand, Benjamin sought to problematize the notion of the subject in the Western tradition; on the other hand, he sought a structure of experience that would confront the poverty of experience in modernity. In "Berlin Childhood", such a structure turns out to be the childlike capacity for imitation (mimesis). Memories reformulates (often in the same words), explores, and presents the themes and motifs of the 1910s and 1920s: the child's mimetic relationship to things and nature; the primordial relationship between language and name; the bourgeois apartment as prison; play as demystification and liberation.

According to Petes, Benjamin, like Sigmund Freud, is credited with initiating the modern scientific study of cultural memory. His fragmentary sketches on the cultural significance of memory, emphasizing its relationship to the crisis of tradition, reflect a key moment in the paradigm shift from traditional conceptions of memory as a repository to a constructivist model of memory, the latter initially emerging as a compensatory response —in Berlin Childhood expressed in the metaphor of grafting— to the breakdown of continuity and tradition, to the experience of crisis. Memories address the question of cultural heritage and the status of tradition, including the historical and narrative conditions of its possibility, and problematize concepts of personal identity. The "archaeology of modernity", continued by Benjamin after Charles Baudelaire, the surrealists and the photographers, later became, through the influence of Michel Foucault, an important part of cultural studies and penetrated into literature (the work of the German writer W. G. Sebald, who was influenced by "Berlin Childhood").

== Text's structure and coherence ==
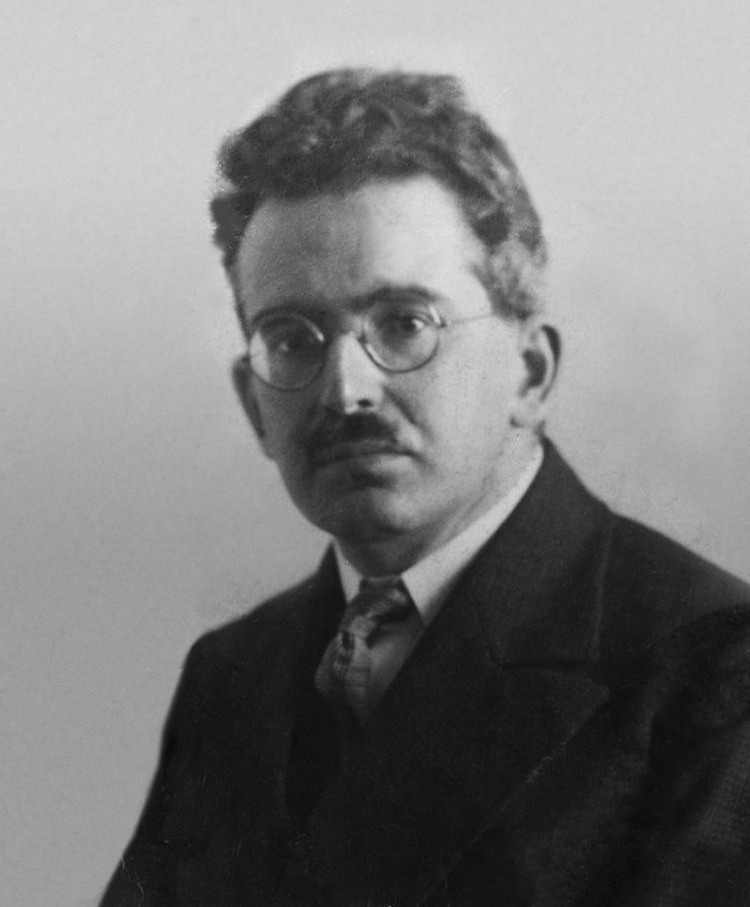
Walter Benjamin in 1928

The author constructed a series of stylistically and thematically unified short fragments — "thought images". This approach was part of Benjamin's movement after "One-Way Street" toward a dialectical method of montage, a combination of isolation and assemblage. "Berlin Childhood" has no definitive structure, but neither is it a random collection of images and memories. Benjamin attached great importance to the placement of the fragments and their number (30), which is confirmed by all the edits as well as letters and notes. At the same time, it is unclear whether he succeeded in realizing his plans for the unity of the collection and the arrangement of the fragments, since the author's very approach rejected a linear scheme; the role of the arrangement of the individual sequences remains debatable. On the basis of the final edition, Witte defined the text as a "coherence" in which several specific plots are constantly reproduced. According to Witte, the structure of the book is not merely detailed, but follows a deliberate plan that suggests the integrity of the text. The commentator drew attention to the numerological principle in the arrangement of the fragments, distinguishing two large groups of 13 texts each (again divided into groups of 5 and 7 texts, with their own "hinge texts" as central), with the fragment "The Otter" in the middle; the final texts "Two Brass Bands" and "The Little Hunchback" occupied a special place, acting as syntheses of the method and content of the whole.

On the basis of the selection of certain key themes (e.g., memories of the future in the hermeneutic interpretation of Anne Stüsi, or the motifs of the threshold and the labyrinth in the psychoanalytic study of Marianne Muthesius), commentators have tried to see the degree of coherence of the text, which is difficult to determine at first because of the free sequence of fragments. The fragmentary form —a "kaleidoscope of memories"— prevents a definitive interpretation, the isolation of individual leitmotifs and central metaphors in the text, since some variants are always excluded. The rearrangement of images generates their new combinations (constellations). According to Schweppenhäuser's observation, rhetorical figures and poetic constructions with multiple meanings constantly interrupt the act of reading, delaying the reader. The sentences are rather divisions or caesuras, they can be at the beginning or at the end; they preclude the possibility of a coherent presentation of the author's intention. As the Germanist Gerhard Richter has pointed out, Benjamin, using a method already employed in One-Way Street, has created an enigmatic self-portrait that breaks with the conventional narrative principles of the confessional genre-linearity, chronology, hypotaxis — in favor of kaleidoscope, fragmentation, parataxis.

== "Berlin Chronicle" as a preliminary work ==
The fragmentary autobiographical notes and sketches, called "Berlin Chronicle", constitute, as Scholem puts it, the "embryonic cell" of The Berlin Childhood. The early work is generally considered to be the first edition and most important preparatory draft of The Berlin Childhood, and is less studied. In contrast to the later edition, the Chronicle does not confine itself to a description of early childhood, but also includes episodes of adolescence and memories of the student years, shows political convictions and the specific circumstances of family and friends. The text has therefore often been used as a source of biographical data or information about the young Benjamin's philosophical development. The manuscript sheds light on his complex relationships with family and relatives, friends and teachers (the story of the "four rings" through which friends and girlfriends were connected); describes his first sexual experience with a prostitute; and reveals Benjamin's deeply personal relationship to various neighborhoods, streets, squares, and places (Tiergarten, Pfaueninsel, and the city's cafes). The text recounts their political activities during their college years, the dissolution of their student group, and the outbreak of the war. A special place is given to the story of an early deceased friend, Fritz Heinle, who committed suicide in 1914 in protest of the First World War. Benjamin originally dedicated The Berlin Chronicle (along with Sasha Stone, Scholem, and Asja Lacis) to his late friend. Heinle's image embodies the lost youthful illusions of cultural revival shattered by the war. All of these episodes are absent from Berlin Childhood. In his revision, Benjamin removed most of the biographical facts, including the names of people who were alive at the time (only four real names remain in the text), information about his father's profession and business connections-anything that might have been damaging to German Jews. As Gilloch summarizes, the chronicle is suffused with motifs of suicide and death. The suffering and catastrophes of the past, present, and future are placed in the spaces of the city.

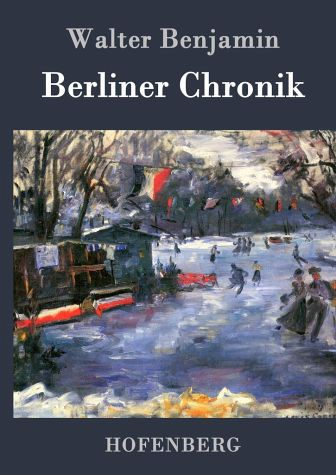
"Berlin Chronicle," German edition 2016. On the cover is Lovis Corinth's painting "Skating Rink in Tiergarten" (1909)

The chronological and traditional narrative of "Chronicle" contradicted Benjamin's theoretical orientation to replace chronology with topography, to break any link between text and reality. In Lemke's estimation, both editions are dedicated to the "mysterious work of memory", as Benjamin formulated it. The first work clearly separates narrative and reflective fragments, personal memories and programmatic theoretical sections, including assertions about the very possibility of autobiography. "Berlin Childhood" is a more literary, stylistically elegant text without theoretical digressions, and it expresses the concept of memory through the poetics of recollection. The revision of the text points to a shift in the "autobiographical pact" (in Philippe Lejeune's terms), the illusory question about the veracity of autobiography —asked from Augustine of Hippo to Jean-Jacques Rousseau— is replaced by a Proustian question about the inevitable loss of the past and its salvation, above all of childhood as a privileged mode of perception. The reworking of the text points to a shift in the "autobiographical pact" (in Philippe Lejeune's terms), the illusory question of the veracity of autobiography —asked from Aurelian Augustine to Jean-Jacques Rousseau— is replaced by a Proustian question about the inevitable loss of the past and its salvation, especially childhood as a privileged mode of perception. Witte notes that the suicide attempt had a decisive influence on the transformation of the text. The awareness of his own mortality, the perception of his life as a series of failures, and the realization that bourgeois childhood was only a small part of "historical experience" led Benjamin to abandon the chronicle in favor of symbolically charged images inscribed in collective memory. In a letter to Scholem in September 1932, Benjamin wrote that his texts "do not tell anything in the form of a chronicle, but present various expeditions into the depths of memory". One of the programmatic ideas of "Chronicle", realized in the poetics of Berlin Childhood, was the thesis that the present determines the representation of memory images, creates:

the unique environment where these images are presented and become so transparent that the contours of the future, however vague, emerge like mountain peaks. This environment is the writer's present.

The "Berlin Chronicle" is placed by the literary scholar Eric Downing in the broad context of the literature and cultural theory of the modernist period (Mann and Freud). The scholar notes the influence of photography, archaeology, and psychoanalysis on Benjamin's memoirs. Photography and archaeology, according to Downing, cannot be reduced to either empirical fields or metaphors, but have both aspects and are therefore symbolic and discursive fields within the cultural imaginary. (Note: Cultural imaginaru - a concept in modern cultural studies that combines the definition of culture as an exchange of meanings (Stuart Hall) with the concept of imagined communities (Benedict Anderson).) In the early twentieth century, various practices —the new aesthetic media (photography), the practices and discourses of classicism (archaeology), and psychology (including Freud's psychoanalysis)— influenced each other and revolutionized visual culture, bringing German culture, and especially the genre of the Bildungsroman, into crisis. In his "archaeology of modernity," Benjamin confronted the ideology of fascism, which also turned to new practices to justify racism and nationalism. On the one hand, the Berlin Chronicle fits into the tradition of German educational history as the maturation and development of the young person. On the other hand, the idea of the contingency of the subject takes the work beyond Bildungsgeschichte: not only is the bourgeois order "attacked," but also the dominant ideas about the subject.

== Intertext ==
"Berlin Childhood", like Benjamin's other texts, is saturated with quotations, allusions, and references. The most important external source is Proust's epic, although there is no direct reference to it. Together with Franz Hessel, (Note: Hessel appeared in the text as an unnamed Berlin peasant.) Benjamin translated three volumes of the Proust cycle in the mid-1920s. Memories contains references to Greek myths (Hercules, Theseus, etc.), (Note: Hamacher points to Aristophanes.) Dante, Shakespeare, and the German Romantics. The text interweaves motifs from German fairy tales and folklore (the Brothers Grimm, etc.), which define the child's perception and the poetics of the text, and themes from psychoanalysis, particularly the "heimlich-unheimlich" dichotomy. (Note: Unheimlich is a term introduced by Freud in his work of the same name. It includes connotations of the uncanny, the sinister, the alien. Unheimlich manifests itself in familiar or everyday things (that is why Freud retained the root heim – home); in English it is usually translated as uncanny.) Benjamin paraphrases Goethe and polemicizes with his legacy as well as with the views of Johann Jakob Bachowen, Hugo von Hofmannsthal, and Ludwig Klages. The image of the hunchbacked little man comes from the folklore collection "The Boy's Magic Horn," which Benjamin knew from Georg Scherer's edition; possible sources include E. T. A. Hoffmann's fairy tale "Little Zaches called Cinnabar", and T. Mann's novel "Buddenbrooks".

"Berlin Childhood" was also influenced by the French photographer Eugène Atget, whose work Benjamin appreciated for its attention to fragments and details, as far as for its depiction of an empty and deserted city, seeing in the photographs of "disappearing Paris" a demonstration of the loss of aura. A number of motifs go back to the Surrealists: the image of the labyrinth (Louis Aragon's The Paris Peasant), urban mythology and the profane dimension (André Breton's Nadia), the flaneur, the city as landscape (Hessel's "A Walk in Berlin", Léon Daudet's "Paris Lived"). Benjamin had a strong interest in the Surrealists of the late 1920s, in their radical change of language and image of the world beyond individual perception, in their "profane illumination" (emphasis on dreams and the sense of dizziness and endless falling, especially through religious as well as drug and alcohol experiences). Although he sympathized with the surrealists' "materialist inspiration" and "revolutionary nihilism," by the time he wrote his memoirs, Benjamin considered them reactionary because they denied the role of memory and overemphasized the moment.

== Benjamin and Proust. "Memories of the Future" ==
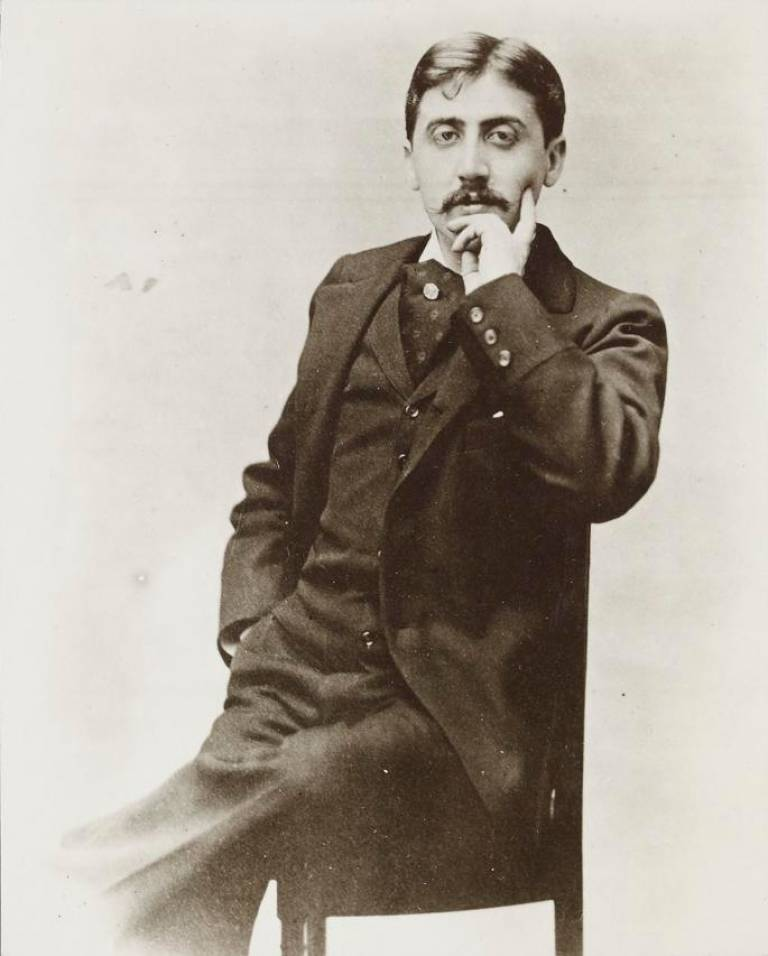
Marcel Proust in 1895

Life and hagiography are distinct and cannot fully coincide in Benjamin's conception of autobiography. These ideas are marked by the influence of Marcel Proust, whose epic "In Search of Lost Time" Benjamin admired, although he admitted to Adorno that his dependence on the French novelist troubled him. A number of motifs in the early editions are clearly derived from Proust: the key role of the mother and grandmother in the absence of information about siblings, the reception of guests (for which the mother comes to the child only to say good night), the authority of the father; the first visit to the theater, playing in the park, the appearance of the telephone and its transformation into a mythical object, the importance of photography and reading, sleeping and waking in a dark room, attention to outside noise. We can speak not only of influence, but also of a "selective affinity" between the two authors. The similarity is also related to the common historical material of the fin de siècle; both wrote about "lost time", linking past and present, the experience of the child and the experience of the adult. Commentators have noted Benjamin's use of the concept of involuntary memory (French: mémoire involontaire), a sudden, spontaneous recollection independent of conscious memory. According to Proust, the images of involuntary memory are not determined by intentional, conscious mental activity, but arise in a moment of illumination. A chain of associations and impressions suddenly and briefly awakens a long-forgotten experience, which is then lost. Like the refined fabric of Proust's childhood memories, Benjamin's childhood images are more random and independent of consciousness. According to the philosopher and Benjamin scholar Jeanne-Marie Gagnében, it is profoundly Proustian to define memory as an infinite unfolding — "the ability to interpolate endlessly what was". In "Berlin Chronicle", Benjamin wrote the following:

Autobiography is not always memories, even extended ones. And these, even those of the Berlin years, which are the only ones I am concerned with here, are not always autobiographical. Autobiography is concerned with time, with its course and with what creates the continuous flow of life. Here, on the other hand, it is about space, about moments and discontinuities. If months and years reappear here, it is only in the form they take at the moment of recollection. This strange form —it may be called fleeting or eternal— is not at all the stuff of which life is made.

In spite of the obvious parallels, Benjamin made a clear distinction between his project and that of Proust. The differences between the two authors have been explored at length (Peter Sondhi, Anna Stüsi, Christa Greffrath). As Lemke notes, Benjamin followed his own thesis from the Chronicle: "Proust, who once unfurled a fan of memories" in his "deadly game ... would hardly find more followers than he needed comrades". Proust's task is not to find the lost time but, paradoxically, to free it from its own incompleteness by placing it outside of time. In escaping time, Proust dreams of its disappearance. Sondhi noted that Proust's true goal is to escape the dangers and threats of the future, to escape death. Proust's quest is realized in the coincidence of past and present through the similarity of experience. Marcel finds happiness in finding his childhood in the taste of madeleines with tea, although he realizes with horror that he is subject to the laws of time. While for Proust the world of memory is perfect, in Benjamin's past perfection is always absent. As the philosopher, art historian and Benjamin scholar Jean-Michel Palmier summarizes, in contrast to Proust's moments of happiness and joy, the moments of Berlin's childhood appear as failures and unfulfilled promises.

In Sondhi's and Stüssi's interpretations, Benjamin, unlike Proust, does not try to free himself from temporality, nor does he strive for the ahistorical essence of things; he does not flee from the future or long for the past, but defends historical experience and knowledge (Sondhi). In contrast to Proust's subjective insights, Benjamin's images are embedded in historical knowledge. The French novelist listens attentively to the echoes of the past, while the German author searches in the past for the first signs of the future; his past is open and incomplete. Benjamin awakens the emotional chaos of childhood experience because it contains a promise, a "spark of hope"; he liberates the past in the name of the future. From this perspective, Benjamin's lost time is the future, not the past. The search for lost time becomes a search for a lost future, a "hope in the past" (Sondhi) or a "memory of the future" (Stüssi).

== "Archaeology". Images of memory ==
Commentators often quote a famous fragment from the Berlin Chronicle, where Benjamin allegorically compared immersion in memories with an archaeological dig:

Language has unmistakably indicated that memory is not an instrument for studying the past, but its scaffolding. It is the medium of the lived, just as the earth is the medium in which dead cities are buried. Whoever wants to approach his buried past must behave like a treasure hunter. This determines the tone and manner of authentic memory. One should not be afraid to return to the same material, to scatter it as one scatters the earth, to turn it as one turns the soil. For the material is only a deposit, a stratum from which only the most meticulous research can extract the true treasures hidden in the depths: images torn from all previous contexts and standing like precious fragments or torsos in a collector's gallery, in the chambers of our late understanding. To be sure, a successful excavation requires a plan. But just as necessary is the careful probing of the dark earth with the trowel. Therefore, those who keep only an inventory of finds in their records, and not this vague joy of space and place of discovery, deprive themselves of the best.

Memory is not a hermeneutic tool for thinking, a way of exploring the past, but a place or medium for remembering, experiencing, and thinking; a medium or place for gathering information about exploration and the past. In memory, memories of past experience and experience itself are created, embodied, and performed; in memory, the past is transformed. The denial of the instrumental role of memory is consistent with Benjamin's conception of language. Language, like memory, is paradoxically not reducible to a mere means of accessing an external referent; literary and cultural studies scholar Katja Haustein argues that the introduction of language as a medium or vehicle of memory allows Benjamin to avoid the distinction between active and passive memory, a model characteristic of Proust and Freud. The central building block of memory is the principle of spatiality; memory is not just a scene of remembered events, but has a spatial structure. In contrast to Proust's narrative approach, Benjamin spatializes time, people, things, and the content of consciousness. According to Lemke, Benjamin refers to the method of loci of ancient mnemonics (ags memoriae) as well as to Freud's topographical model of memory and psychoanalysis. In Benjamin's model, these elements are transformed into a poetics of memory, so that the space of the text corresponds structurally to the space of memory.

Benjamin's archaeology problematizes narratives of linearity, sequence, and progression, including the stated genre of the chronicle. The process of finding is as important as the objects found, and the excavated site is even more significant than the artifacts. Therefore, as in an archaeological excavation, it is equally important not only to inventory the finds, but also to identify the local and precise excavation site in today's soil. The movement of the shovel is both teleological and experimental, the archaeologist aims to find treasure, but luck also plays a role, and the results are torsos, rubble and fragments rather than a coherent and organic narrative. Archaeological work is not about collecting individual things, but about dispersing, atomizing, or scattering the contents of memory. Hamacher noted that dispersal is a condition of collecting. Memory contents must be plowed or foamed to produce images, at which point memory deposits must be articulated and destroyed. New layers produce new images of the past and fragments taken out of context, which have value only when their former meaning can no longer be discerned. Each time a historical text is read in a new way, which is why, Richter concludes, there is never an unchanging past to possess.

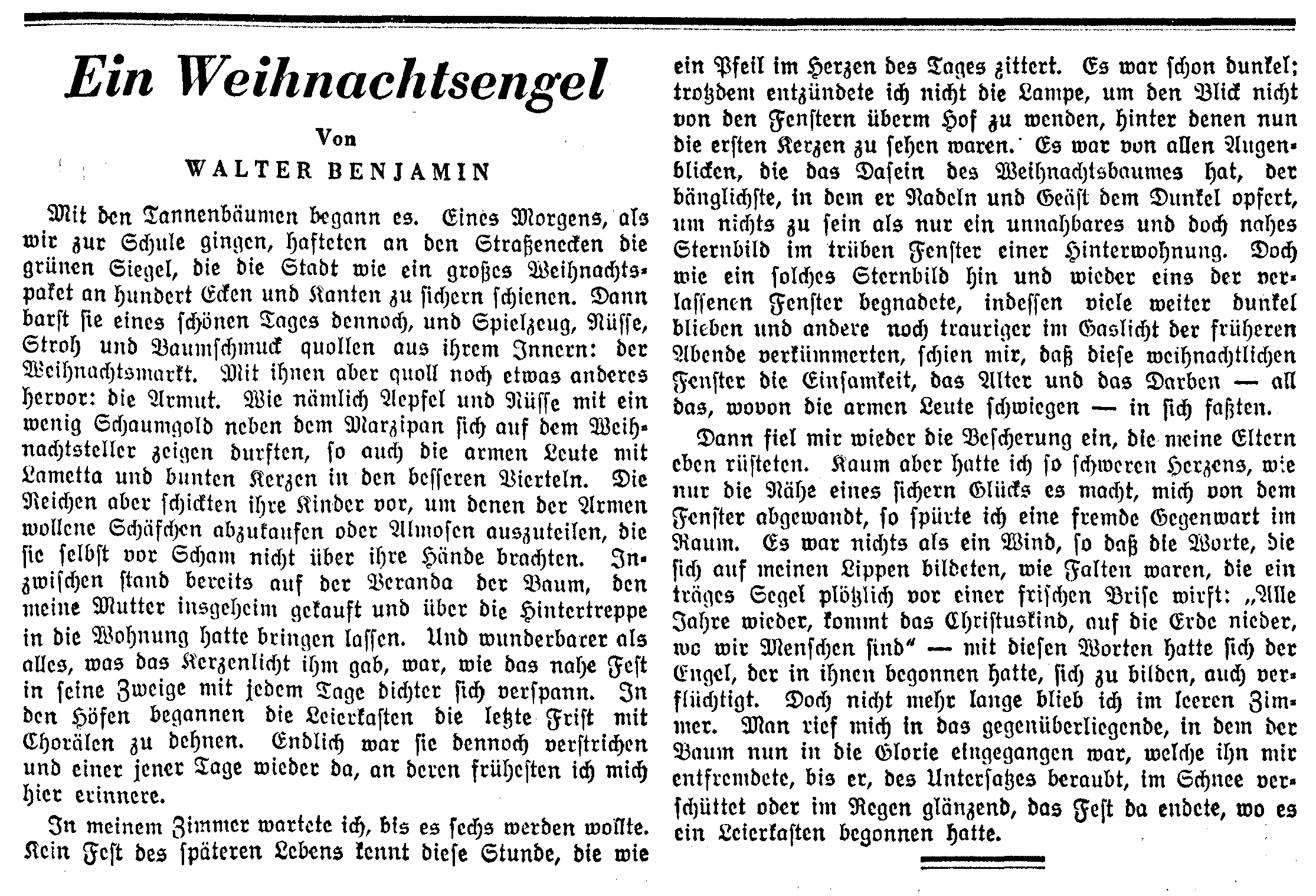
A fragment of "The Christmas Angel", published in the Vossische Zeitung. 1932

The allegory of excavation and the method of scattering is a memory of visiting Aunt Lehmann's apartment and observing the glass rhombus on the table. Inside the rhombus were toy mines, "little men pushing carts, swinging jackhammers as hard as they could, and shining flashlights into tunnels where ore-lifting baskets scurried up and down". Germanist Eric Jarosinski noted that the focus was not on the soil being explored, but on the tools of collection and inventory themselves: carts, picks, winches, and flashlights. Subsequently, the mines —and the entire neighborhood— become home to prostitutes and beggars; similarly, Aunt Lehmann, the "viceroy" of the neighborhood, originally seated on her throne in the bay window, is transformed into a caged bird. As Jarosinski suggests, Aunt Lehmann's mines represent a mini-allegory of Benjamin's other allegories. The allegory resists substantiation and nominalization, avoids touch and control, confirmation and predictability. The excavation site must remain an allegory, just as there are always images waiting to be discovered.

The deliberate recollection of "images of childhood," Benjamin wrote in the preface, was an effective method of "vaccination that heals the soul" during exile and homesickness. Benjamin added that just as nostalgia should not be stronger than thought, so a vaccine should not be stronger than a healthy body. The method of inoculation has been associated by commentators not only with nostalgia but also with impending social upheaval. Autobiographical observations become a defense strategy against possible melancholy, a kind of cathartic practice. As Jarosinski notes, the image of inoculation —the miniaturization, the germ of the whole, what is not a disease but resembles it— proclaims a critical intention based on the allegory that Benjamin finds in Baudelaire. "Berlin Childhood" represents the activation and even radicalization of allegory, for Benjamin has not only placed his life in the realm of the allegorical, but has literally transplanted allegory into himself. The literary and cultural scholar Linda Hoverti Rugg saw a reference to Freud's "Beyond the Pleasure Principle," to the idea that neurosis functions as an inoculation or defense against shock.

In the preface, Benjamin notes the "social irretrievability of the past" and concludes that "the images of a childhood spent in the big city proved capable of forming the rudiments of my perception of history". The concept of image, which is central to Benjamin's analysis of modernity, is linked to allegory in Berlin Childhood. The concept of image, considered by many scholars to be central to Benjamin and his analysis of modernity, is linked to allegory as a symbol in Berlin Childhood, and also refers to the form of the text as a "thought-image". According to commentator Eli Friedländer, understanding the depths of the past from the perspective of the present presented Benjamin with the difficult task of linking individual memory and collective memory, which required a rethinking of a number of dichotomies: external and internal, subjective and objective, private and collective, image and concept, sensation and meaning. Despite some affinity with Proustian involuntary memory, Benjamin explicitly contrasts the private (and individual) lived event with the collective experience. The images go far beyond the consciousness of the narrator, they are the memories of a particular person, but not in the context of the events of his life. By giving memory a spatial form, Benjamin transforms individual memories into collective experiences of places, moments, and situations.

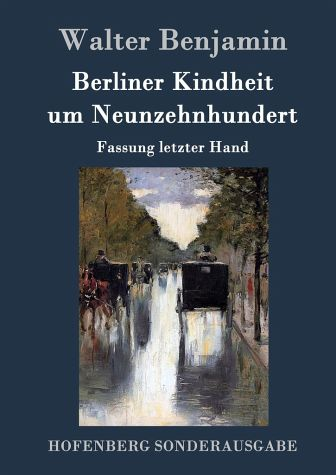
The 2016 edition of Fassung letzter Hand. The cover is Lesser Ury's painting "Berlin Street Scene" (1910)

"Forming the rudiments of perceptual history" means that the images of memory do not correspond to past perceptual experiences: the transition from past to present, from child to adult, takes place within memory. The images bring together many separate unconscious perceptions. As the Germanist Carol Jacobs has pointed out, language and memory are not identical, but are located in the same field, where images are inevitably mixed with objects of perception. It is therefore impossible to distinguish between the images of Benjamin's text and the images that an archaeologist unearths in the past. We confuse images with objects, which only testifies to the unreliability of our perception; it is always determined by images. The fact that the past is not so much reconstructed in memory as formed in it does not lead to a distortion of experience — images are formed on a fundamentally different level than conscious memory: they are fleeting and difficult to retain, but they are the gathering point for a multiplicity of meanings. Benjamin constructs an infinite series of miniature images, monads or infinitesimals (in Leibniz's sense), that stretch time in a tense rhythm, flashes. These are all images because their aesthetic completeness is a condition of their meaning, and because they must give way to others. An example is the otter from the zoological pool, which the child notices after a long wait; for a moment the otter floats to the surface, but immediately disappears into the depths. The text "Cabinets" presents the central metaphor of autobiographical memory. The child opens the larder and reaches through its contents to the far corner, where the stockings lie:

Each rolled pair was like a purse, perhaps. I knew no greater pleasure than the pleasure I felt when I slipped my fingers into the very depths of a rolled up pair of stockings...I kept pulling the "stuffing" out more and more until the amazing event happened: the "stuffing" was there in front of me, but the wallet it was in was gone! No matter how many times I repeated this experience, it wasn't enough. It showed me that the form and the content, the cover and the hidden, are one and the same.

"The Stocking" is a metaphor for the "truth" of memory, which no longer refers to an external referent or to hermeneutic depths, but is an endless unfolding of memories. Commentators have noted the erotic aspect, the element of desire. As Friedländer suggests, desire is neither fulfilled nor repressed, but inevitably dissolves or disintegrates, since disintegration is a structural condition of desire itself. The unfolding of the stocking does not allow us to penetrate the reality of the past, but gives it a stable form, a unified surface of meaning, where the distinction between object and outer shell, content and form, interior and exterior, disappears. Contradictions are also overcome in the fragment "The Sewing Box." The child is attracted by the skeins of thread; he is beckoned by the holes of the spindle, taped with paper circles embossed with the name of the company and the number of threads. Although the child succumbs to temptation and pushes through the paper with his finger, destroying the inscriptions, he already knows that the inside is empty. As Jarosinski notes in the preface, in the phrase about "images of childhood" Benjamin used the adjective "habhaft" with the meaning of mastery, grasping; the recreation of images refers to a desire that cannot be realized. The past is inaccessible to representation, yet in need of allegorical salvation. Lemke notes that it is not a matter of restoring a lost or original unity, but rather of describing the disappearance of the past in the act of writing. Describing the past, in turn, does not mean living it or knowing it "as it really was"; Benjamin is interested in translating the images of the past into the experiential space of the present, only there do the images make sense. The liberation of the past lies in its actualization, but in this liberation the past —the wallet or the books— is destined to disappear irretrievably. The necessary loss or disappearance of the past allows "the rudiments of the perception of history to be formed". In the fragment "Winter Morning," Benjamin writes of the desire to "get a lot of sleep," of which he dreamed at home, on the way to school, and in class:

I must have done it thousands and thousands of times, because in time it came true. But it was a long time before I realized that it had come true, because my hopes of finding a steady job and a secure piece of bread were always in vain.

Such a fulfillment of desire, according to Friedländer, is not a matter of mere disappointment or of parting with the illusions of the past; nor does it imply the necessity of their literal fulfillment. There is a temporal gap, a difference in experience, between the making of a wish and its fulfillment. Friedländer compares this model to that of magical fairy tales — the fulfillment of a wish may disappoint the hero because, in making the wish, he does not understand what the world in which it will come true will be like. From Lemke's perspective, Benjamin, following Freud, takes into account the temporal gap between initial unconscious perception and subsequent realization. For Freud, the "impossibility of a lossless translation" (to quote Jacques Derrida) between the unconscious and consciousness leads to a psychological reworking of traumatic experiences and memories, giving them a new meaning; Freud introduced the concept of "aftermath" (Nachträglichkeit). This concept is close to Benjamin's: memory does not recall past events, but constructs what has escaped understanding but has been preserved in the form of an unconscious trace. (Note: Lemke relates these ideas to Derrida's notions of trace and additionality.) "Berlin Childhood" does not represent past events, but creates a memory of them, as does the memory of temporal difference, which manifests itself primarily in the act of writing. According to Lemke, for Benjamin the significance of Proust's involuntary memory lay not in the randomness of the images (an aspect he criticized), but in the after-effect. Memory gives us an image of ourselves, it is impossible to possess it, and it is impossible to reflect on it.

The dream, always associated with waking, is the example of memory access. Images of the past have much in common with dreams — they are not formed by sequence or causality, but as imagination, a configuration of the dream. The dream precedes consciousness and is rather constructed during waking, (Note: The Awakening was a key theme in the Passages.) at the moment of its disappearance. In "Boy's Books", Benjamin recalls a dream about old books that disappear forever as soon as he wakes up, before he can read or even touch them. According to Hamacher, this does not mean reading, but only the possibility of reading, which is not realized upon awakening. The dream of the books disturbs the dream and interrupts the reading before it even begins — this rupture Hamacher interprets as an act of awakening in which the possible and the real come together. Despite the immersion in sleep in his "psychoarchaeology," Benjamin never rejected awakening. On the contrary, he insisted on awakening for history and action, convinced that dreams help to awaken from the nightmare of the present. According to the Italian commentator Carlo Salzani, the act of remembering a particular place and a particular historical period becomes a political action and an authentic historical experience that makes it possible to restore the link between experience and memory that has been lost in modernity and to save experience itself.

The archaeology in "The Berlin Chronicle" was focused on top-down, vertical movement, excavation, and the deep layers of memory. This approach was in line with Freud's thesis of a comparison between the work of the psychoanalyst and the work of the archaeologist. "Berlin Childhood," says Jarosinski, is marked by a softer touch, even a moment of levitation, reflecting a slight change in the epigraph dedicated to the Victory Column in the Tiergarten. Motto's "Oh, baked Victory Column with children's sweets of winter days" becomes "Oh, baked Victory Column with winter sweets of children's days". The reader's position also shifts, from depth to surface, from fragment to distortion; the archaeologist's spade remains, but is supplemented as if by a film camera's view from above. Benjamin's archaeology has become an archaeology of the present, offering, as Jarosinski puts it, a necessary yet enigmatic configuration of critical possibilities in modernity.

== Child, city, labyrinth ==
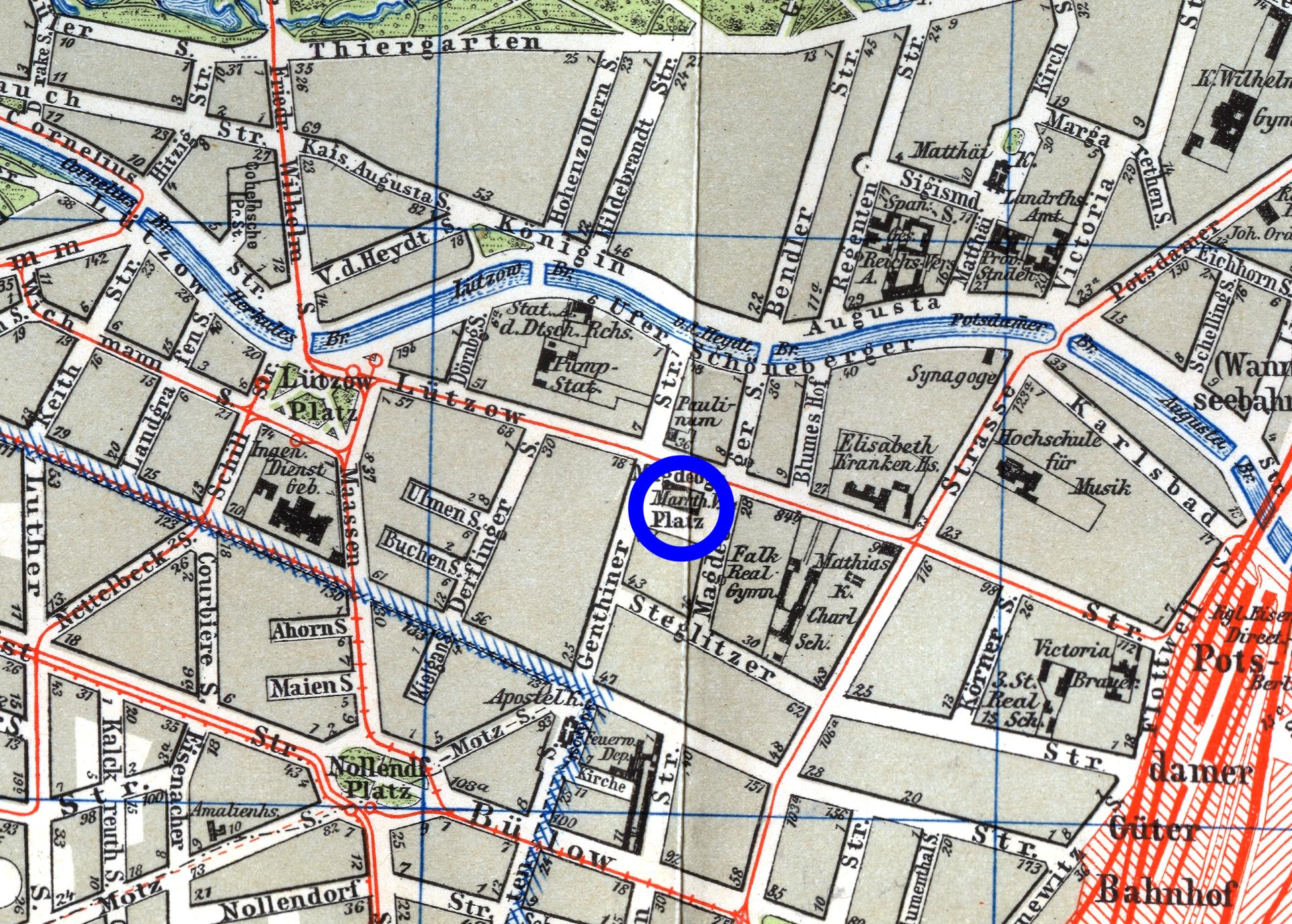
Map of a part of Tiergarten including the Landwehr Canal, Magdeburger Platz, Steglitzerstrasse (now Polstraße), Gentinerstrasse. 1896

To describe his hometown, Benjamin writes in the fragment "Tiergarten," one must "lose oneself in the city as in a forest," which "requires training. The text of the chronicle is supplemented by the sentence: "Paris taught me this art of wandering; it realized a dream whose earliest traces were the mazes on the blotters of my school notebooks. Benjamin emphasizes the importance of the guides (Note: Benjamin speaks of five guides, but two of them are definitely unknown, perhaps because of the incompleteness of the text. Scholem found three, Tiedemann and Schweppenhäuser all five. Gagneben considers Proust to be the first guide.) who introduced him to the city: the nannies who watched where he walked; Paris, who taught him to "look back" (Vorbehalt); his friend Hessel. Among the guides, Paris, the former center of Benjamin's attention in "Passages," has a special place: the entrance to the labyrinth of the native city is opened through the labyrinth of the foreign city.

In Peter Sondhi's interpretation, the Berlin memoirs represent an attempt to "convey the experience of alienation and of being a foreigner. The children's impressions and images show how the adult becomes a stranger or an outsider in the familiar space of childhood. The motif of distance, of traveling and encountering the distant in time and space, comes to the fore. Creating distance is a prerequisite for describing the city, for a journey into the past is always a journey into the distance. In Berlin, the adult Benjamin becomes a stranger in the city of his childhood. Sondhi believes that Berlin Childhood does not examine memory, but rather proves the key role of distance. The child's gaze is used by Benjamin primarily to create an unproblematic sense of distance. The child is the "unconscious" subject. Its naive and erroneous perception serves as a method of defamiliarization. The sense of distance is the best way to describe the city. In Sondhi's version, the child becomes a lens or a telescope that forms the distance between the observer and the observed, subject and object; the adult Benjamin "knows" Berlin but takes the reader back to a period of ignorance; the foreign city turns the adult back into a child. The child, a symbol of innocence, ignorance, and naiveté, opposes the adult. Gilloch, criticizing Sondhi's interpretation, wrote that the motifs of proximity and distance are linked dialectically and not for the purpose of representation. Proximity is paradoxically achieved through distance: Benjamin travels through time to get closer to things. The city and its objects "expand," approaching and enlarging (the child's gaze), receding and shrinking (the "foreign" city). Time and space are linked by two close but opposing models: traveling into the past at a distance (in Sondhi's sense) and the movement of memories as one traverses a labyrinth. According to Gagneben, childhood images undergo a triple mediation: time (child-adult), space (the writer away from his hometown), and childhood perception (credulity, incompleteness, ineptitude).

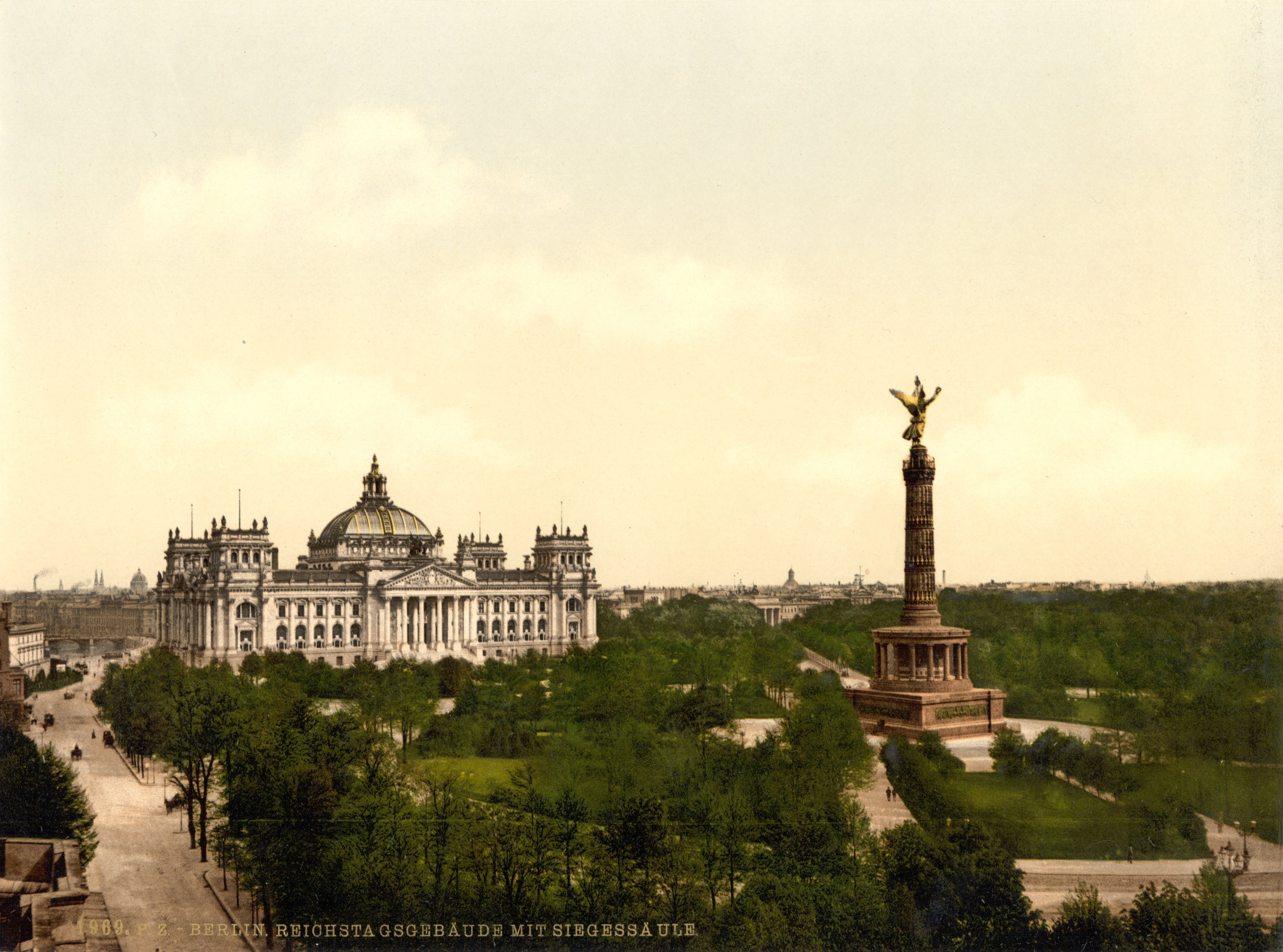
Siegessäule in the Tiergarten opposite the Reichstag. Around 1900

The fact that the city becomes a place of disorientation in the child's perception does not lead to failure or failure, according to Stüssi's interpretation. On the contrary, by losing his adult self and getting lost in the city, the child gains an intimate connection with things that the adult has lost. Stüssi noted: "What we usually regard as signifying inability and powerlessness is here evaluated as a method of mastering". The child's ignorance becomes an accomplishment, an art, something to be "practiced" and explored. Children's disorientation creates a special perception of the urban environment; the paradoxical art of not knowing or not recognizing creates a strange environment: the urban landscape. Expanding on Stüssi's thought, Gilloch wrote that the "first impression" revives the forgotten image of the city, as yet unaffected by indifference, boredom, and forgetfulness, all of which constitute the destructive power of habit. "False" knowledge makes it possible to free the forgotten objects and spaces of the city from objectification, to perform an act of critical liberation. Criticizing Stüssi's interpretation, Gilloch wrote that the inscription of the city in the labyrinth of memory fails to take into account the fundamental role of the city.

In Gilloch's interpretation, the city is brought to the foreground. The commentator sees three models of the relationship between memory and the urban landscape in the text: the labyrinth, shock and involuntary memory, and urban archaeology; the third model combines the first two. The experience of modernity represents the experience of shock and fragmentary impressions; the maelstrom of urban life destroys conscious memory as shock and other stimuli act directly on the unconscious. The traumatic experience of shock leaves hidden "scars" that are not completely forgotten and are retained by the adult. This is why involuntary memory predominates in the modern city. Gilloch suggests that Benjamin, following Proust, was trying to heal the wounds inflicted on the child's unconscious by shock. Healing or liberation is performed by the urban archaeologist, who retrieves traces of shock from the depths of the unconscious, rescues the experience of childhood from the adult. The city is an unmarked grave, a dead place desecrated by the forces of modern barbarism and amnesia. The archaeologist finds lost fragments of the past, recalls the countless forgotten lives of the forgotten dead, for whom no monuments or memorials have been erected, but whose silent shadows inhabit the city. The liberation of the utopian impulses of the past, the actualization of the shattered hopes and unrealized aspirations of past generations constitutes a political practice in the present that rescues the past from destruction and appropriation by Nazism; the urban archaeologist "scratches history against the grain" (ideas that converge with the philosophy of history in On the Concept of History). Gilloch's reconstruction has been criticized for its emphasis on the individual unconscious and for exaggerating the role of Proust's involuntary memory for Benjamin.

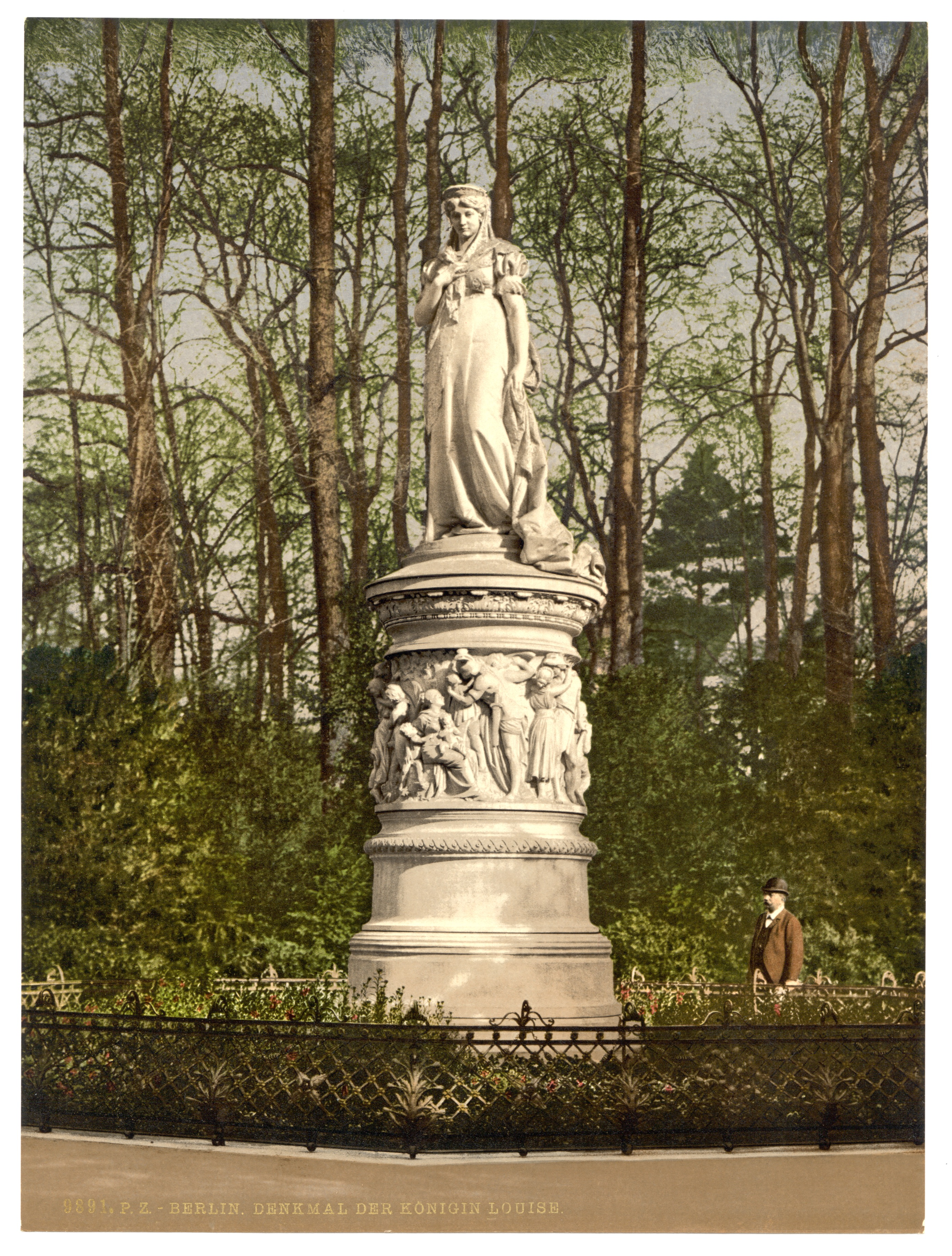
Monument to Queen Louise in Tiergarten Park. Around 1900

A labyrinth of streets, squares and corners, houses, monuments and gardens, places where a child's individual memories, cultural identities and big-city experiences converge. The Tiergarten fragment, according to Palmier, represents the entire project of Berlin childhood - to see the spirit of the fin de siècle in every object and every place. The child explores the labyrinthine city park, its winding paths, streams, woods, statues, and picnic areas. The park's alleys and canals are repeatedly compared to the image of Berlin as a labyrinth. Upon entering the park, the child immediately reaches the "goal": the monuments to Frederick William III and Queen Louise. He takes his eyes off the statues and looks at the pedestals, the inscriptions on which appear to him as unfamiliar hieroglyphics. According to Gilloch, the monuments to Frederick William and Queen Louise, representatives of the nineteenth century, are mythical idols created by the nineteenth-century bourgeoisie for self-aggrandizement and narcissism. William and Louise embody indifference and arrogance, their "timeless" figures and dead stares demand humility and submission. The impossibility of escaping the Gorgon's spell is combined with the impossibility of coherent representation, of revealing the unambiguous and definitive meaning of the monuments. Mystical links connect the signs of death and love, fiction and reality. There was Ariadne in the Tiergarten maze, and Benjamin remembered another Louise, a dead schoolmate, Louise von Landau, who revealed to him his first experience of love. In Witte's estimation, in a journey through the neighborhoods of West Berlin —where Benjamin grew up— and the Tiergarten, the child traverses the history of the West, observing simultaneously the universe of the ancient gods, the "cold beauty" of the aristocratic world, and the age of the bourgeois work ethic. The child remains outside these worlds, marked by the shadow of death; he is separated from the dead by a "water barrier", the river of oblivion (the Lutzkai on the Landwehr Canal, where Louise lived). The fragment ends with the transformation of the western quarters into a garden of the Hesperides; the mention of Hercules refers to human suffering and toil and, according to Witte, contains a utopian promise.

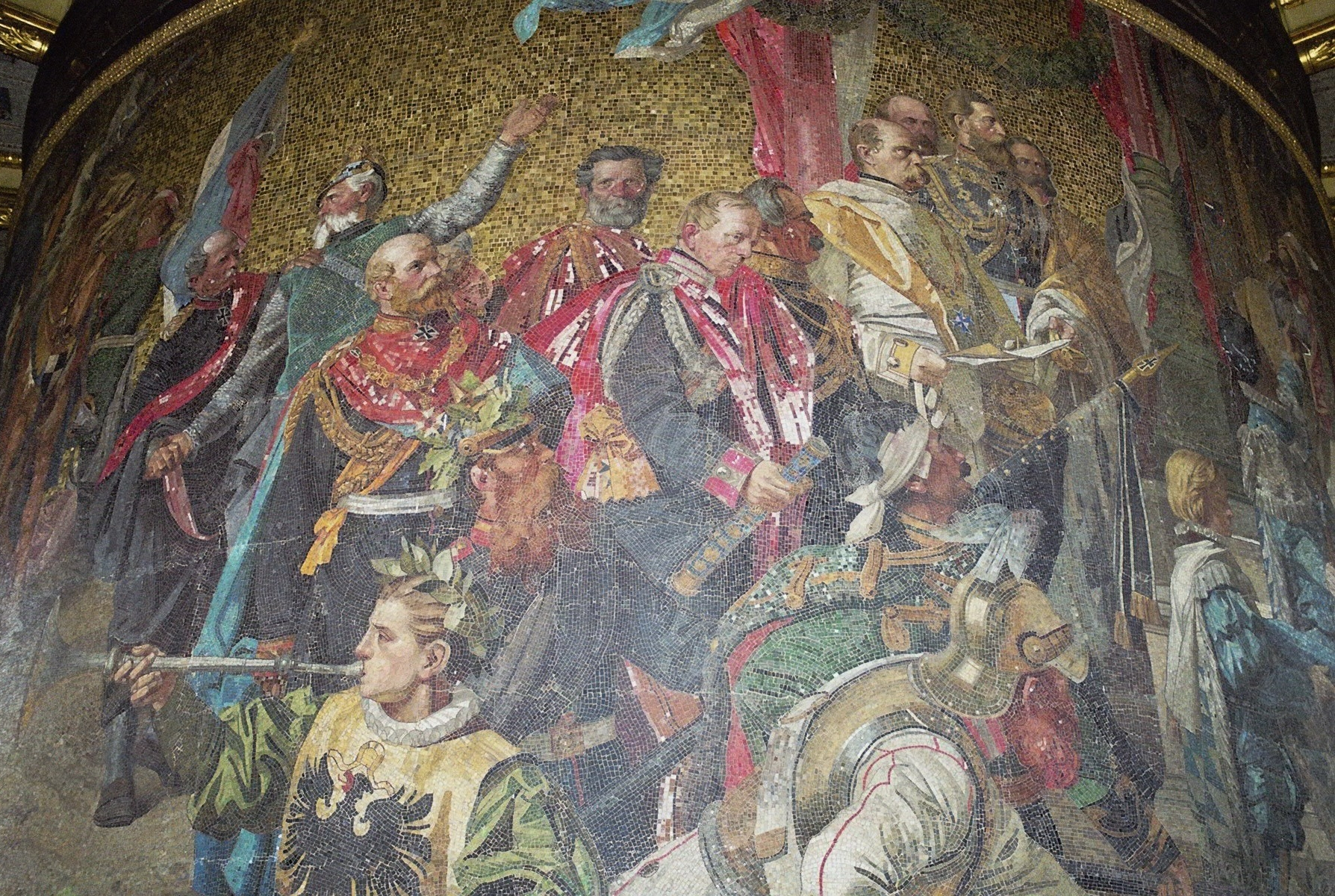
Mosaic on the Berlin Victory Column

The fragment of "Victory Column" is dedicated to the monument erected in honor of the victory in the Franco-Prussian War and the creation of the German Empire. Benjamin recalls that after the Battle of Sedan, the column "stood like an obelisk" over the "venerable tomb" into which world history had descended, leaving only the annual parades and celebrations ("the eternal day of Sedan"). The child cannot understand the exact purpose of the Victory Column; the mosaic on the slab of the covered colonnade is associated in his imagination with Dante's description of the "Underworld". According to Witte, Benjamin refers to the bourgeois cultural heritage and, paraphrasing the classical formula of emancipated life in Goethe and Hoffmannsthal, describes the upper part of the colonnade, where the heroes are depicted, as "brightly illuminated people". History, Witte concludes, unfolds as the "hell" of the defeated and the celebration of peace on "Sedan's Day". Gilloch wrote that for Benjamin, the pomp and pageantry of the celebration, the grotesque and pretentiousness of the monument distorted the past, the monument glorified war and conquest. The mythical monument establishes the cult of heroism and the omnipotence of the German Empire, but, as Stüssi notes, it actually aestheticizes or even deifies the history of barbarism - a history of vanity, cruelty, and violence. Benjamin compares the column to a "red number" on a tear-off calendar, reflecting the falsity of claims to timelessness and emphasizing their transience and impermanence. In Gilloch's view, the invocation of the column many years after Germany's defeat and the collapse of the imperial system was ironic — by the end of World War I, the monument had already become a symbol of helplessness, the monument and the parades in Benjamin's description reflecting the complacency and short-sightedness of a short-lived social order. Gilloch notes that the monument, as a product of human labor, is meant to praise civilization, but becomes alienated and fetishized and begins to dominate its creator. The paradoxical features of the modern metropolis: self-deception and stupidity, ignorance and inhumanity, myth and myopia are thus revealed by Benjamin's critical gaze. To these monuments, Gilloch suggests, Benjamin juxtaposes his own memorials in order to capture an alternative history within the city, in Stüssi's words, "the underside of history", a space of mourning, fragility, transience. Benjamin's "monuments of childhood" are memorials to the forgotten dead; they point to transience, impermanence, mortality. Opposite the Victory Column stands the House of Assemblies, (Note: It was a meeting place for activists of the youth movement. Heinle's body was found there after his suicide.) a symbol of the shattered romantic aspirations of Benjamin's generation, the hopes for a cultural revival. The alternatives to the Tiergarten statues are Louise von Landau's apartment and the grandmother's dusty apartment with its obsolete things, unnecessary junk.

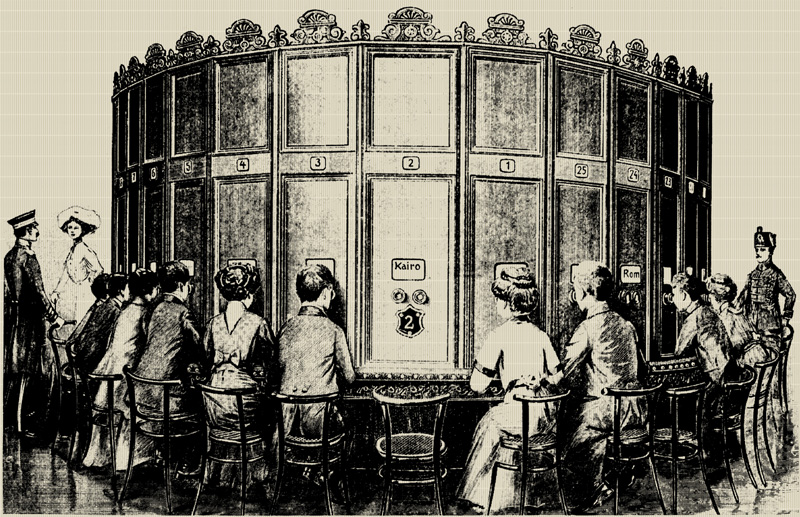
"Imperial Panorama", 1880s

In "Passages", Benjamin noted that it is impossible to deny the similarities between the world of modernist technology and the symbolic world of the archaic and mythology. In "Berlin Childhood", these connections are explored in the texts "Telephone" and "Imperial Panorama". The fragment "Telephone" shows the process of the disappearance of the immediate, acoustic communication characteristic of traditional societies and the emergence of modern media. The child not only plays at the turn of the century, but also stands on the threshold of a new media paradigm: the telephone establishes a new form of perception and consciousness, changing codes and channels of information. Benjamin focuses not on the functional aspects of the telephone, but on its spatial position and movement: from the periphery to the center, from the "dark canyon" of the corridor-where it hung on the wall next to the dirty laundry drawer and the gas meter-to the bright and inhabited rooms. At first, the phone is mistrusted and suspected by the family members, but then it suddenly becomes the center of attention. Its noise penetrates the home, disturbing the child - the call is perceived as an "alarm bell". As a mythical object, the omnipotent telephone inspires terror, threatening not only the parents' afternoon rest, but also the entire era. The second fragment links the memories to Benjamin's socio-historical studies, and describes the precursor of cinema, the "imperial panorama," a popular form of photographic plastic in the late 19th century, a device for displaying stereoscopic images. Benjamin recalls that in his childhood these "arts" were already out of fashion, the panoramas visited mostly by snobs and artists, the half-empty rooms filled with children. A child looks at successive pictures in a small frame with "views of distant countries". As Witte noted, although the pictures evoke dreams of travel - impressed by the dispositif depicting the French city of Aix-en-Provence, the child imagines himself playing on the Boulevard Mirabeau —they draw him home and even suddenly change their meaning, showing a glimpse of nothingness (the pictures lose their brightness due to lighting malfunctions). Witte correlates the description of the panorama with the structure of the autobiography— the "sadness of separation" evoked by the bell before the image changes coincides with the experience of reading Berlin Childhood, which consists of fragments and gaps. From this point of view, Benjamin, who is usually reluctant to express sentimental feelings, succumbs to "nostalgia" and tries to convey to the reader a vision of an irretrievably lost past.

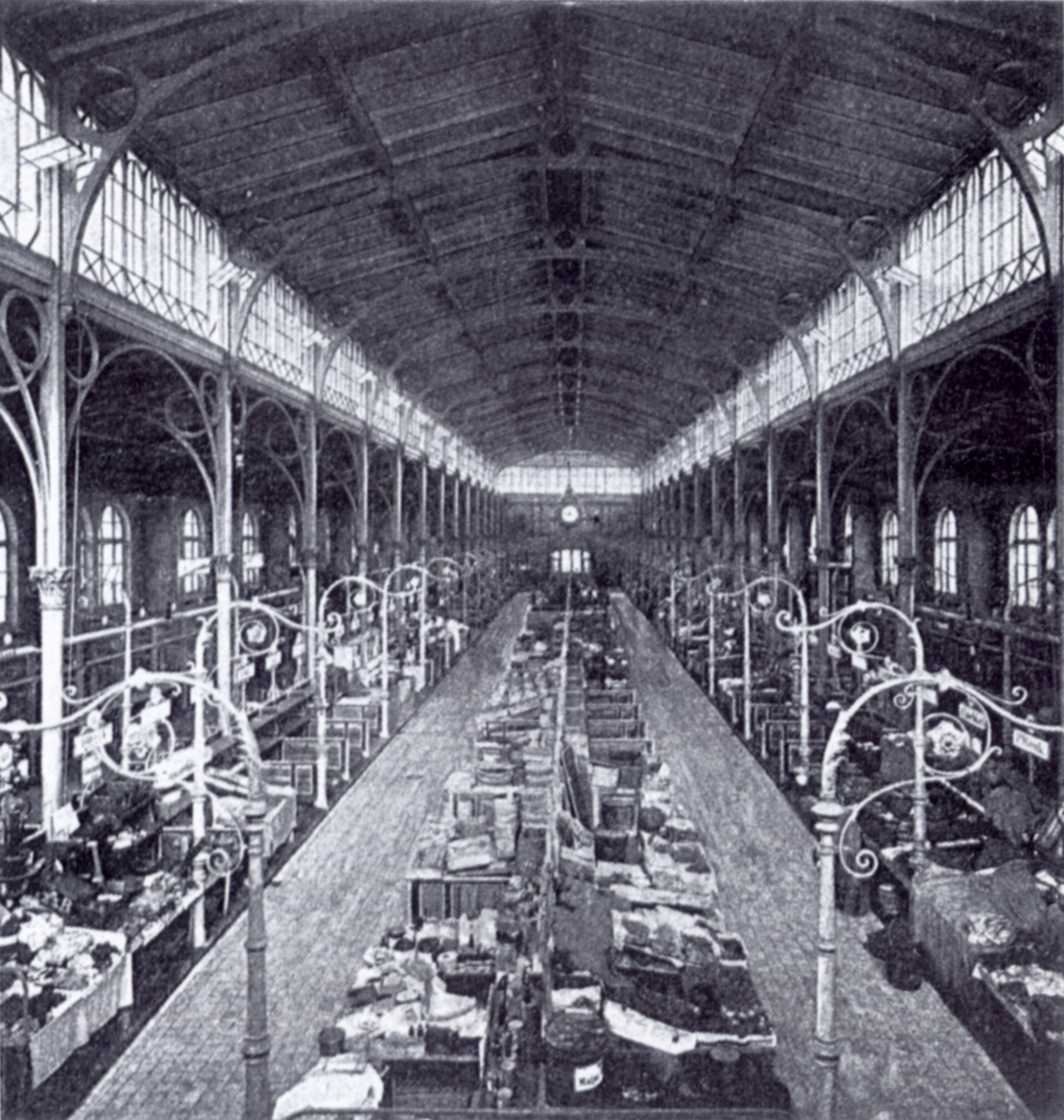
Covered market on Magdeburg Square, 1890

The fragment "Markthalle Magdeburger Platz" combines the mythology of the metropolis with class and sexual themes. The covered market at Magdeburger Square is presented as a mythical space filled with dangerous magic, clearly untouched by education and the rationality of bourgeois culture. The child's eye perceives the mythological structures that permeate the most developed social forms (Note: Georg Simmel's concept.) and are at the center of commodity capitalism. Seated on thrones behind the stalls, the burly shopkeepers —"priestesses of the venal Ceres"— appear to him as secret servants of the commodity, mystical rulers of fields and gardens, guardians of the sacred place, even as ugly woolly colossi. Something "swells and juices" under the merchants' skirts, and the child sees "fertile ground" where the god of the market throws the goods. This fertile layer, notes the cultural researcher and Benjamin scholar Michael Jennings, is contained in the soil of the entire city. The primordial landscape of the market refers, on the one hand, to the dead prehistoric landscape of the allegory in Benjamin's monograph "The Origin of German Tragic Drama" and, on the other, to the "swamp world" (Vorwelt) (Note: The term is borrowed from Bachowen. Most often identified by commentators with myth and forgetting, although Benjamin's notes are contradictory.) of Benjamin's writings on Kafka. At the same time, the mythology of the market also has a positive, emancipatory connotation: the lower classes of society (shopkeepers) are associated with genuine economic production and genuine eroticism; they are not only the source of commodities (Note: Richter sees an affinity with Marx's analysis of commodity fetishism in Capital, a rejection of the superficial view of the commodity.) and thus of the wealth of the bourgeoisie, but also the carriers of sexual energy (in the latter aspect, the influence of Bachowen is likely).

The labyrinth, one of the key images of "Berlin Childhood", not only expresses the space of the city, but is also a metaphor for the temporal connections between past, present, and future. According to Gagneben, the image reveals the subject's relationship to himself in the circles of love, travel, reading, and writing. It is as if the child is walking through a labyrinth as she freezes at the window, hides behind furniture, is late for school or synagogue. In the empty "labyrinth without Minotaur" (C. Greffrath) there is no goal, it excludes a stable identity of the subject or a definitive representation, in it only the search for the self through change is possible. According to Gagneben, the labyrinth represents the mystical structure of desire, the underside of culture. The past is reflected in the image of the labyrinth, whose objects and spaces appear as if for the first time, approached from different perspectives. Time is not linear and chronological — the past keeps moving and reappears behind. The absence of linearity corresponds to Benjamin's method from his theoretical works. Gagnében noted that the "death of intention," proclaimed in the epistemological preface to the monograph on Baroque drama, meant a rejection of linear discursivity in favor of "umständlich" thinking, whose temporal structure is described in terms of roundabouts, detours, stops, returns, waiting, cyclical movement, oscillation, and so on. The method is similar to the scattered attention of Surrealism and the Freudian notion of free-floating attention-thinking and writing unfold unconsciously. The perpetual circling of memories corresponds to the non-linear form of Benjamin's texts. The labyrinths of the modern city and the workings of memory are inscribed in the formal characteristics of the texts, which are essentially labyrinthine. In Stüssi's formulation, "each chapter of Berlin Childhood is an image of a labyrinth: there is no development, the goal remains hidden".

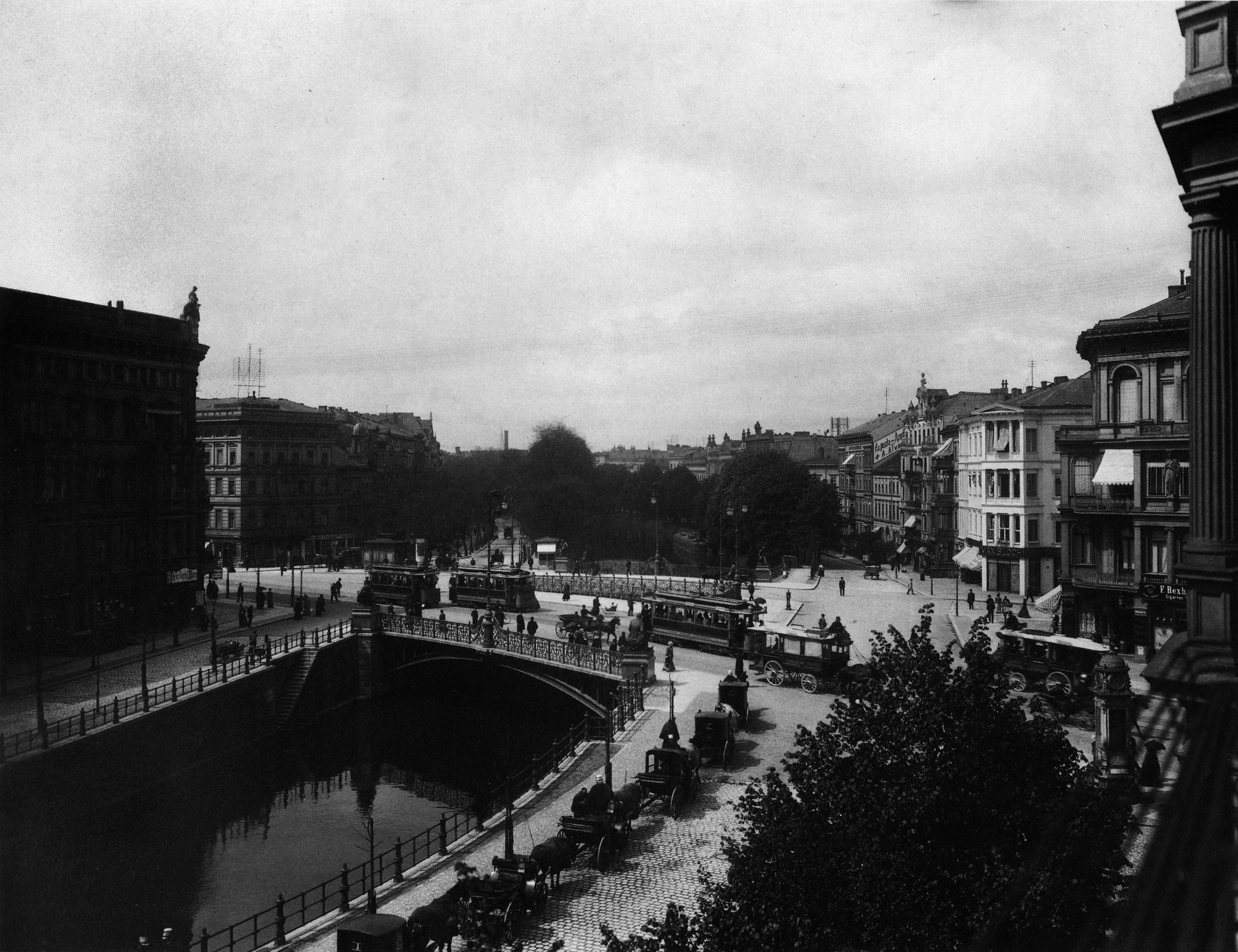
Landwehr Canal and Potsdam Bridge, 1899.

== The danger of objects and threshold spaces ==
The child finds himself in a multitude of dungeons —he is a prisoner not only of the neighborhoods of West Berlin, but also of his little body, his illness, the horrors of his apartment, its stifling furnishings and Biedermeier decorations. Family and social strategies aim to conceal the existence of others— the poor and the rebellious, as well as thieves, arsonists, revolutionaries (the image of the proletariat or the Other). The child sees only a glimpse of the outside world when he happens to meet beggars and prostitutes, and is surprised by the vulgarity of the merchants of the covered market. The child is protected by collections of postcards, illustrated books and stamps; the rhythm of life is regulated by birthdays, receptions, family visits, Christmas parties, holidays. The walls of the home are fortifications that protect the bourgeois world from fear, poverty and death. The most striking example is Tante Lehmann's apartment in the Tiergarten, (Note: In "At the corner of Steglitzerstrasse and Gentinerstrasse".) protected like Kafka's Gates of the Law. Her "treasure chamber" is guarded by countless sentries-mute caryatid figures, stairs, doors, curtains, servants. The "double protection" includes a dark door with a jingling bell in the vestibule and a door to the entrance hall, between which a narrow and steep staircase rises ("At the Corner of Steglitzer and Gentiner Strasse"). Domestic spaces tend to repress hardship and even death; in them:

There was no place even for death...Death was not foreseen here. That's why this place seemed to be the epitome of coziness during the day, but in the evening it became a realm of darkness.

"The age-old sense of bourgeois reliability" ("Blumenhof, 12") does not protect the private sanctuaries of Berlin apartments from ominous danger. Despite all the protection, Stüssi notes, the child feels threatened even in his grandmother's apartment, which is safer than the parental home; private property and parental omnipotence are threatened from the outside. As Lemke writes, the safe interior cannot be permanently shielded from what it attempts to exclude — this attempt produces the excluded. The bourgeois world of the late nineteenth century is invaded by ghosts, fires, gangs of robbers and murderers ("Occurrences and Crimes"); according to Witte, the text demonstrates the movement of history from childlike happiness and innocence to the experience of nothingness. The child's gaze perceives the fragility of things and creates terrible chimeras. Ominous signs and dangers emanate from ordinary objects, even Christmas toys or a sewing box represent the forces of evil. They threaten the child's illusions of bodily integrity and the integrity and control of things. The bourgeois idyll is shattered the moment the child turns to the sewing box and begins to question its purpose. Skeins of thread are not only erotic, but also a Dionysian force of chaos:

Apart from the upper chambers, where the threads lay in rows, the black needle-books shone, and the scissors protruded from their leather sheaths, there was in this drawer a gloomy dungeon, an eerie chaos, where the unraveled tangle reigned and swarmed with twisted rubber bands, hooks and loops, and scraps of silk.

Nothingness and death are discussed in the fragment "The Moon". The beginning of the text reproduces a Proustian episode — a child wakes up in terror at night. The similarities end there: in Proust, the awakening stops the processes of the disintegration of consciousness and the disappearance of space and time; past and present are reunited, the unity of consciousness and the bourgeois identity of the narrator are restored. In Benjamin's fragment, the child awakened by the moonlight finds himself in a state of abandonment. The moonlight distorts his perception of things, banishes him from his room, his life, and even his body: the child is afraid to go back to bed, it seems to him that he is already there. The child has no past and no future, because "all places are already filled with the past". The world is plunged into nothingness and the child's very existence is called into question: all that remains is a "residue of loneliness. The experience of alienation and isolation in the face of death, the sense of social disintegration, also characterizes Benjamin's personal situation — "The Moon" was written in emigration.

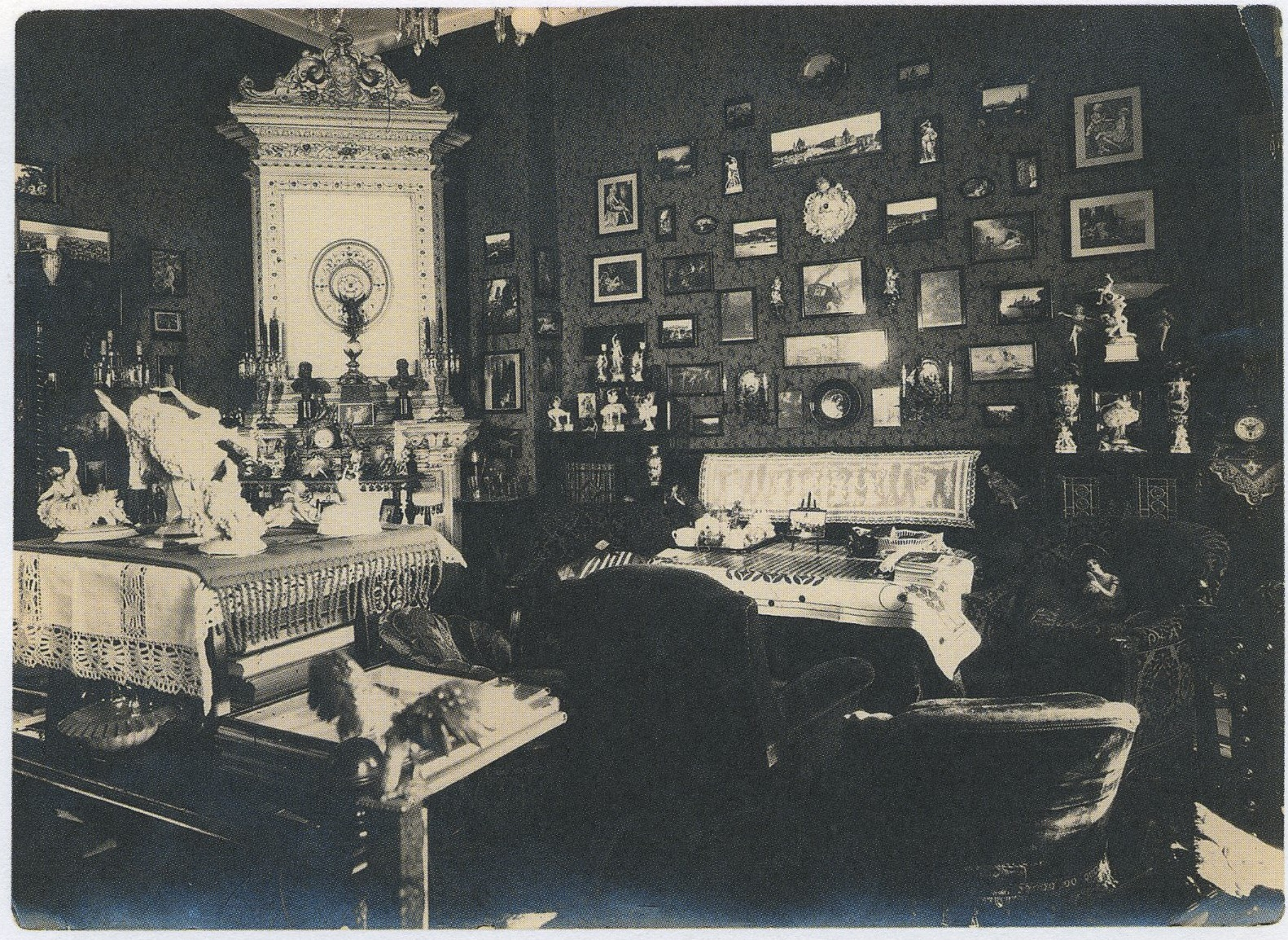
A bourgeois interior in Berlin. Photograph by Sasha Stone. About 1914.

A number of fragments focus on the idea of a threshold or boundary. "Berlin Childhood" describes thresholds of all kinds: entrances, lobbies, openings, galleries, verandas. As Stüssi has shown, the child prefers places with unclear status: courtyards and their verandas, corridors and lobbies, servants' quarters, etc. These spaces connect the bourgeois world with the world of work and need (the proletariat). At thresholds, Stüssi notes, "time drifts". The multiple meanings of threshold spaces are revealed in the texts "Loggias" and "The Humpbacked Man". The fragments describe the gap between the bourgeois and proletarian spheres and indicate the threshold between centuries. In addition to the themes of social boundaries, thresholds refer to the realm of the unconscious and dreams, as well as folklore and fairy tales. According to Lemke, psychoanalytically, spaces are divided into the familiar and the uncanny, light and dark, urban space and underground labyrinth, order and chaos, day and night. The binary structure determines both the memory and the structure of the text — in most of the fragments, poetic spaces and psychoanalytic dream images are intertwined. The topography of memory is heterogeneous, memory is always on the threshold between dream and awakening, the unconscious and the conscious, these realms flow into each other. The opposition heimlich-unheimlich affects not only the objects of bourgeois everyday life, but also the public spaces of the city, which can become dangerous at any moment. In "Crooked Street," the swimming pool is transformed into a mythical underworld whose hostile laws subjugate the child. Having crossed the threshold, he said goodbye to the earthly world and found himself at the mercy of the goddess "with slanting eyes", who dwelt in the element of water. The threshold between the two worlds was also the entrance to the grandmother's house ("Blumeshof, 12"):

The lobby I entered came in the lair of an insidious elf, whose will made my arms and legs heavy and weak, and when the threshold was two or three steps away, the evil spirit's sorcerous charms bound me irresistibly. Such nightmares were the price I paid for comfort.

Benjamin wrote of the fragment "Loggias" that it contained his most accurate self-portrait; in the final edition, the author placed the text first. From the loggia, the child's observations of the city and the adult's memories begin. The loggias with caryatids, the interior balconies typical of Berlin architecture in the era of Wilhelm II, are located at the back of the houses of the great bourgeoisie and face the courtyards, the servants' quarters, and the quarters of the poor. They represent a topographical and sociological threshold: "A Berliner's loggia is the border of his home. Berlin lives on the loggia, the very god of this city". The threshold space of the loggia connects the inside and the outside, the private and the public. The uninhabitable nature of loggias refers to Benjamin's situation in exile. The loggia is "like a mausoleum built in advance for him" in which the child is afraid of becoming a thing. In Witte's interpretation, the comparison with the empty mausoleum shows the ambivalence of the images of memory: the mausoleum is a symbol of death and royal dignity. On the loggia, the child avoids the adult world and asserts himself. Freed from the suffocating environment of his parents' apartment, he feels like the "master of the house". Social barriers and class differences are revealed to the child from the balcony, and their realization is manifested at Christmas: while waiting for presents, the child hears street organs in the courtyards, notices pitiful Christmas trees in the windows of proletarian apartments, and sees poor children anxiously watching their attempts to sell Christmas toys to the children of the rich. Out of solidarity with the poor, he feels alienated by the "celebration" of the ornate home Christmas tree, until it is stripped of all its decorations and thrown into the street ("The Christmas Angel"). According to Witte's commentary, in the child's anarchist view, what is commonly accepted is seen as negative, while what is despised and forgotten contains hope.

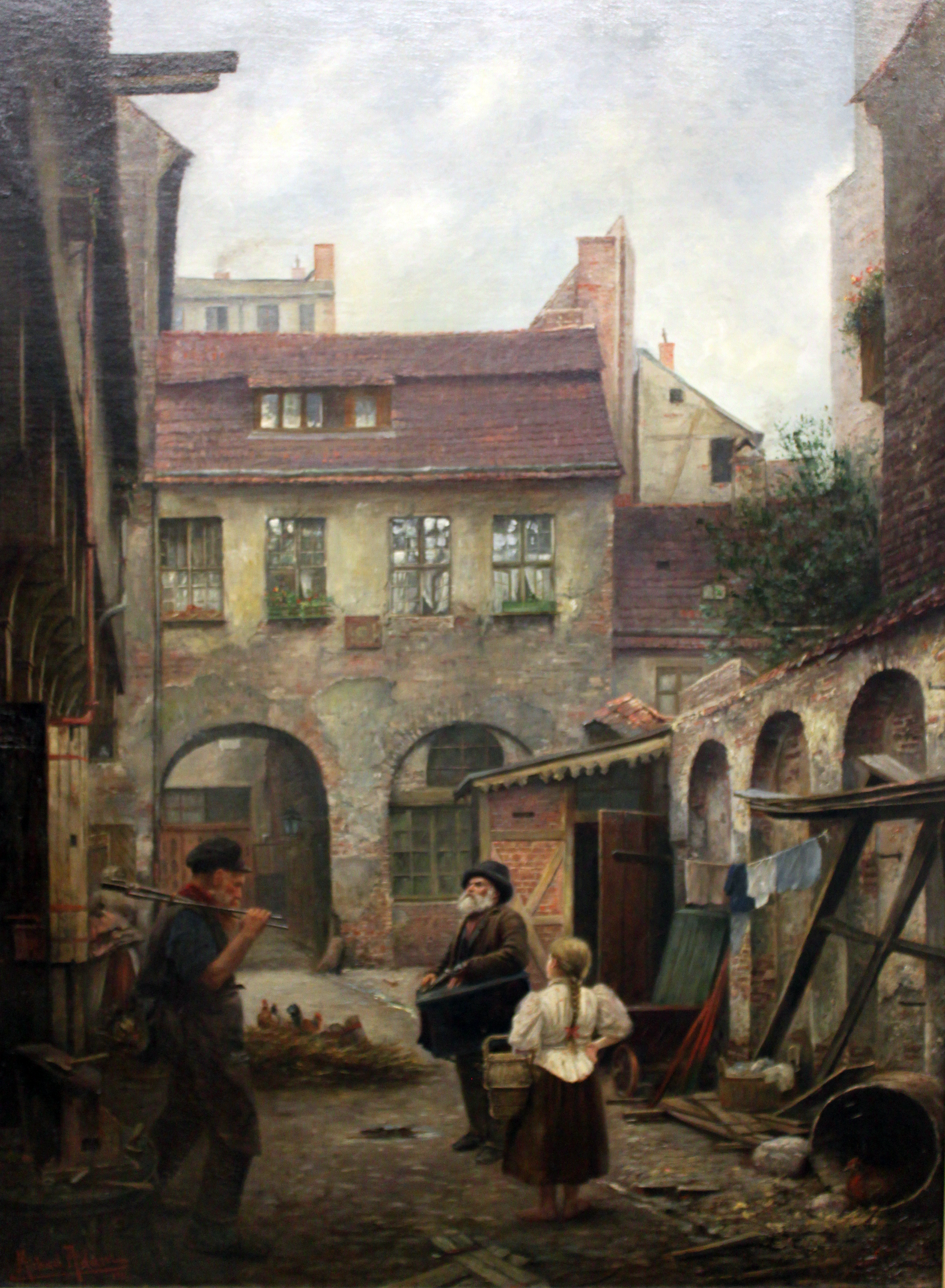
A poor neighborhood in the center of Berlin as depicted by artist Michael Adam ("Krögel" in Berlin, 1901)

From the loggia, the child looks out into the courtyard and notices the patch of bare earth under the cast-iron fence where the tree grows; he thinks about what is happening in the "black pit". As Jennings notes, Berlin Childhood is based on the idea that the understanding of myth is a condition of truth. (Note: Benjamin's theory of myth had been developed since the mid-1910s and had changed significantly by the time he wrote Berlin Childhood. In early considerations, under the influence of the neo-Kantian H. Cohen, myth was opposed to truth.) Myth has an ambivalent nature: the chthonic depths under the tree, when viewed from a certain position (the loggia), contain not only ambiguity but also the promise of true knowledge. According to Winfried Menninghaus's famous interpretation, premodern forms of experience and modern rationality collide in "threshold moments," generating a perspective of perception important to Benjamin's project of liberation. The interplay of old and new creates a kind of revolutionary energy in memory that cannot simply be transferred to progressive ideological models; it is inherently directed toward the past. According to Menninghaus:

Benjamin's interest in thresholds corresponds to a fundamental aspect of his theory of experience. The disappearing archaic forms of experience are obsolete, anti-modern in their orientation; but the farewell to a dying form of meaning structure is not simply a matter of evoking the past. On the contrary, it is through and in the past that the present becomes recognizable.

While walking, the child observes "horizontal gates" in front of shop windows, sees manholes that "did not lead out into the street but rather underground" and peers through bars. During the day, the child sees the signs of poverty on the other side of the bars: a canary in a cage, the light of a daylight lamp, or a nameless inhabitant, all of which take on a magical dimension. At night, he dreams that dwarfs in pointed caps cast glances from the dungeons that "nail one to the spot" ("The Little Humpbacke"). The cellar gaze has often been interpreted in a political or social sense, as the realization by the child of a bourgeois family of the right of surveillance of the lower classes, analogous to the surveillance of prisoners in Foucault's "Discipline and Punish" (Stüssi), or as an inverted and anonymous voyeurism reflecting the political situation of the adult Benjamin, his exile (Schneider). The adult is only able to put himself in the place of the observed objects when he finds himself at the bottom of society, in exile, without a home or a future (Stüssi). According to Gagneben, the pale light from the cellars, like the figures on the mosaic of the covered colonnade of the Victory Column, reflect an uncomfortable political truth the constant hidden presence of the defeated and humiliated people. At the same time, Benjamin describes the space of the threshold without reference to any particular political experience. As interpreted by commentator Marianne Schuller, the horizontal doorway represents the broken boundaries between the upper world of light and the lower world of darkness. In a sociological sense, the former includes the world of goods and shops, the latter represents the impoverished neighborhoods of the metropolis, something between an ordinary basement and a mythical underworld. In the psychoanalytic sense, the lower world is the realm of the unconscious and dreams. In dreams, the boundary between observer and observed, as well as between inside and outside, up and down, light and darkness, is erased. The position of the child-observer becomes a spatial threshold, external in relation to the internal and internal in relation to the external. According to Schuller, this displacement entails a restructuring of the existing social order. The dungeon dwellers who frighten the child and threaten bourgeois security —the "nocturnal passersby" or "beggar rabble"— are compared by the author to the needle and pin of the Brothers Grimm's fairy tale "All kinds of rabble". As Lemke concludes, this reference does not lead to a definitive identification of the dream images, but merely points to another threshold of the text that calls into question the clear division between fiction and reality.

The transfer of mythology from the public sphere to the bourgeois home, the unmasking of myth in the material objects of modern culture, brought Benjamin closer to the proponents of the philosophy of life (Ludwig Klages, Carl Gustav Jung, Wilhelm Jensen) and to his other implacable opponents, including fascist ideologues. As Downing suggests, Benjamin, realizing the danger, eliminates the potentially heroic and vitalist dimension: the objects of bourgeois everyday life become ordinary, banal, even kitsch. They are too historical and bourgeois for any identification and therefore cannot serve any eternal or archaic truth and cannot be appropriated by fascism.

== The Little Hunchback and the forgetting ==
The fragment about the little hunchback concludes all editions of "Berlin Childhood", which was probably Benjamin's intention. The image of the hunchback binds the space of the text; it cannot be reduced to clear symbolism. The little hunchback, who appeared in the essay on Kafka as the "inhabitant of a distorted life", appears in the last fragment as the "gray ruler," the lord of the dungeons forbidden to the bourgeois child. Like the other characters of German fairy tales, such as Domovs, kobolds, and gnomes, the hunchbacked little man is invisible, he belongs to the world of dreams, night, and distortion. The little man appears in the text in connection with the gnomes; the child never notices the little man when he observes him, like the gnomes, he escapes his gaze. In Benjamin's deleted fragment of the text, the hunchback possesses images of "a whole life" that flash before the dying man's eyes. He turns out to be the true "author" of the images of the memoirs behind which the author of the autobiography hides. The Germanist Burckhardt Lindner believed that the hunchback resembles the child he looks at: like a child, the little man hides behind the things and events of life and watches them disappear. The model of the all-seeing hunchback was associated with the panopticon from Foucault's "To Supervise and Punish": the little man had the power to "arrest" the child, but he only had to watch him, causing the child to drop or break something.

The relationship between the hunchback, the adult (narrator), and the child is quite complex because, as Rugg pointed out, the ominous dwarf is neither an adult nor a child. The hunchback is both guardian and captive, both binding and being bound by the child and the narrator. He embodies both the oppressed and the oppressor, the image of the Other and domination at the same time. The hunchbacked man reflects the child's fears and also acquires a prophetic dimension: in this vision of the future, the child will not get the independence and adult protection he desires. Rugg drew attention to an aspect of anti-Semitism: the hunchback, belonging to the "race" of dwarves, has a clear resemblance to images in Nazi propaganda, where Jews were usually depicted with physical abnormalities (especially a long nose). The association of ugliness with evil was present in German folklore and literature long before Hitler, although the little hunchback did not always represent evil. Rugg noted that Benjamin was not only opposed to German identity, but refused to belong to both the Jewish secular family and the Zionists in Scholem's circle. The hunchback thus reflects the fate of Benjamin himself: he appears at the intersection of German and Jewish traditions and has no clear identity.

The hunchbacked little man embodies the irreducible element of memory — forgetting; his image links the text to the philosophy of history, making Berlin Childhood a special case of Benjamin's historical epistemology. According to common interpretations, the little man represents an allegory of ineptitude, failure, and forgetfulness-all that distinguishes the child from the adult, the unconscious from the conscious, and is shunned by the power of the autonomous and conscious subject. The dwarf is to blame for the child's troubles and misfortunes, responsible for his clumsiness and inattention to the world around him. For the adult, the hunchback is the embodiment of the forgotten, of things that have been forgotten. This uncanny forgetfulness cannot be forgotten, it is always present in the world and in ourselves. The hunchback, according to Schuller, is close to Leibniz's monad, whose folds extend into infinity and which, like Benjamin's memory, cannot imagine itself. Leibniz's image of the monad is "a garden full of plants and a pond full of fish"; Benjamin's monad is disfigured by the hunchback and traumatized (in the Freudian sense) by forgetting. As Lemke writes, the hunchback does not control the Ego, but precedes its formation, the moment of utterance and memory, is their constitutive condition-the hunchback "was always there". Only under the condition of distortion and forgetting are identity, expression and memory possible. The hunchback defines the deformation and displacement inherent in the spaces of memory. The hunchback has not only taken "the tribute of forgetting," but has also "taken half a share of everything..." He does not remember what he has forgotten, but forgets only half of it. The dwarf, then, creates the conditions and the possibility of memory, represents its transcendental state, which allows us to see the constitutive process of forgetting. The hunchback appears in the last fragment as the subject of memory and the place and scene of memory; Schuller points out that without the work of the little hunchback, "Berlin Childhood" would never have been written.

The hunchback refers to a visual perspective in which things are left behind, slipping away, disappearing. This perspective is reminiscent of the angel of history, whose gaze is fixed on the past. For the angel, things drift into the past; for the child, they recede into the future. Both are united by impotence: the angel before the mountain of rubble and the child who has broken something through the fault of the dwarf; the reader of Benjamin's fragments is also impotent. The hunchback always appears at the moment when something is smashed, damaged, or splintered, although the text does not make it clear who is smashing what or how. The destructive work of the hunchback confronts the child with the experience of shock that characterizes industrial societies. (Note: In an essay on Baudelaire, Benjamin used Freud's theory of shock in analyzing art.) According to Schuller's conclusion, the image of the dwarf indicates that history, like the history of the subject, is, contrary to appearances, always ruins, rubble, shards. The hunchback came close to the political-theological reflections of the Theses on the Philosophy of History: the child belongs to the history of the oppressed and defeated, and the hunchback must rekindle the spark of hope in the past. The essay on Kafka argues that the hunchback will disappear with the coming of the Messiah; in the "Theses," by becoming an ally of historical materialism in the struggle against fascism, he embodies the Messiah. From this perspective, by giving the hunchback the last word in the text, Benjamin associates him with the hope of messianic liberation. At the same time, images of "a whole life" are only possible before death, when the power of memory seems to weaken-the metaphor of the hunchbacked little man does not allow us to draw a clear conclusion about the optimism or pessimism of Benjamin's project, its focus on historical and aesthetic renewal. "Berlin Childhood" remains ambiguous and therefore open to interpretation.

== Photography ==
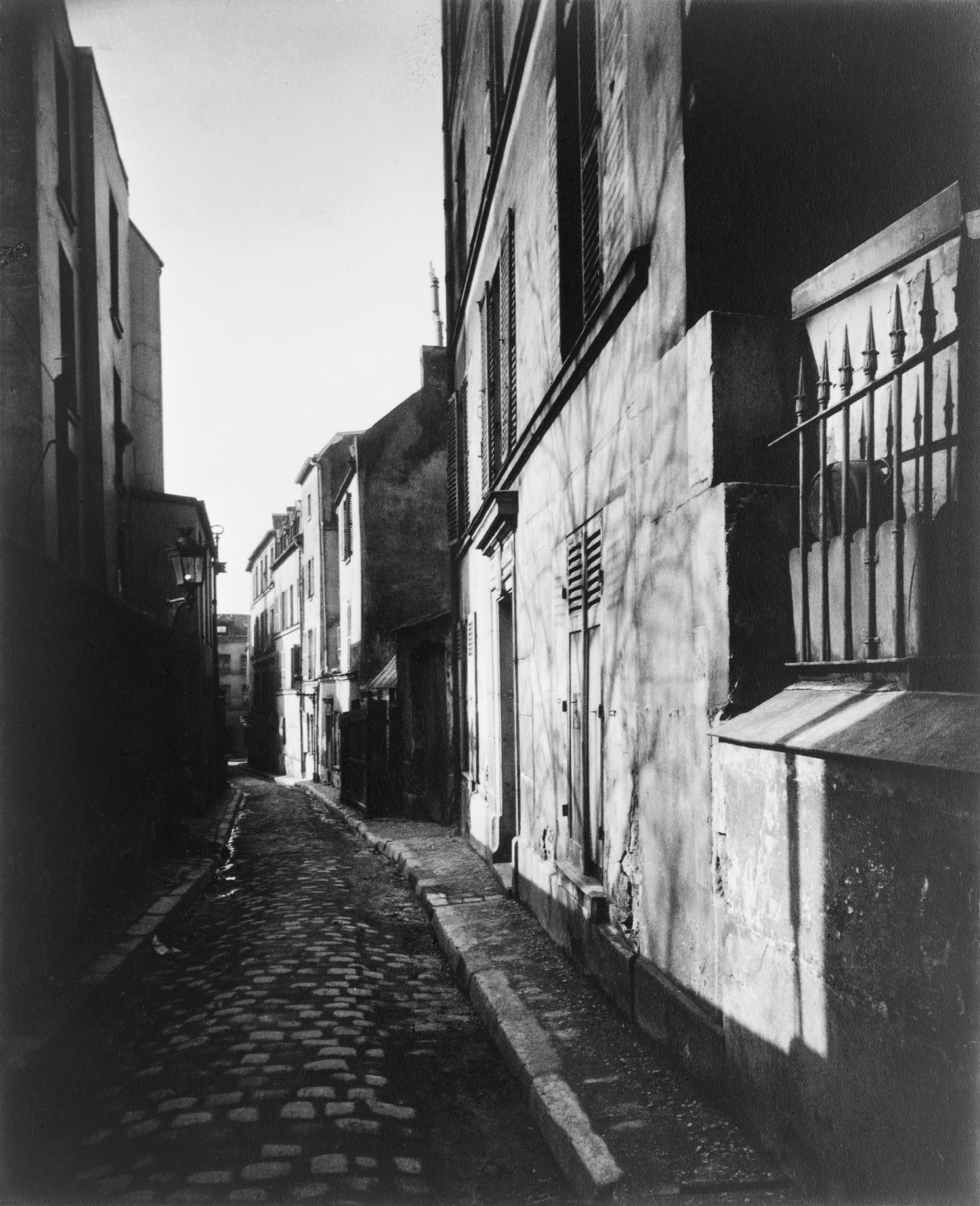
Rue Saint-Rustique in Montmartre. Photo by Eugène Atget (1922)

In "Berlin Childhood", the photograph had theoretical significance for the conceptualization of language, image, and history, and was a model for memory and the writing of autobiography. The photographic character of the text was noted as early as Adorno, who compared Benjamin's thought to a "photographic snapshot" and "intellectual optics. In the words of the commentator Eduardo Cadava, Benjamin's memoirs are a series of photographs; the author himself called the memoirs "a series of pictures," although the text contains no photographs. The movement from fragment to fragment —and from moment to moment, likeness to likeness— is produced as if by the click of a camera. The use of the photographic technique, photomontage, allows for the fragmentation of time, its integrity and linearity, creating "authentic historical images". The photographic metaphor, which focuses on temporal aspects and denies the dimension of depth, complements the spatial model of memory. According to Haustein, the "photographing" of the past in Berlin Childhood is not concerned with objectivity or accuracy, but rather aims to evoke affective, visual, and acoustic sensations. In The Berlin Chronicle, Benjamin compares the mechanisms of memory and photography, noting that the power of snapshots lies in the fact that "we ourselves are always at the center of these rare images," but simply because "such moments of sudden illumination are at the same time moments in which we are outside ourselves. Kadava noted that for Benjamin, photographs are always associated with "stupor" and death; there is no relationship between the photograph and the referent, between the photograph and the photographed (in "A Brief History of Photography", Benjamin mentioned Atge's photographs of deserted Parisian streets). Commenting on Kadava's thesis, Rugg writes that the photograph splits the "living" self and the "dead" self, the present and the past, lived and observed experience; it interrupts and freezes time. Similarly, in autobiography one remembers the "dead" self, bringing the past into the present. "Pictures" or snapshots of the past in Berlin Childhood are ripped from the course of history, in them the past collides with the present, forming, in Benjamin's terms, a constellation or monad; photography blurs the distinction between past and present, interrupts the linear flow of time, and takes a moment in time out of context and into the future. The photographic model corresponds to the concept of allEgory in The Origins of German Baroque Drama, where Benjamin saw allEgory as a ruin or fragment. The various objects in "Berlin Childhood" are allEgorical: a sewing box, stockings, a bowl of porridge, snowflakes, butterflies, and a net, a covered market, and children's books. As spatial "fragments," photographs break out of the flow of time and the context of experience, dividing space into fragments. Like allEgories, photographs do not capture the world as a whole, but only a random and miniaturized part of it.

The technological reproduction and reproducibility (photography, cinematography) means that visual images shape human perception (something Benjamin was one of the first to point out), influence human perceptions of the self, and can be used as a means of manipulation. As Jarosinski puts it, Berlin Childhood marks a farewell not only to childhood and the city, as Benjamin writes in the preface, but also to a time when images were not yet visual and fragmented. Benjamin applauded the revolutionary transformative power of photography, but noted the loss or diminution of the aura in the "age of technical reproducibility" of the work of art. Mourning this loss did not negate the need to destroy the aura, which implied the political goals of opposing fascism and capitalism. According to Jennings, Berlin Childhood showed the negative aspect of photography: its role in the decay and destruction of experience. Photography also involves relations of power and subordination, a repressive aspect, because it helps the state to destroy the "incognito of the individual" (M. Schneider), it can be used to manage and control, to persecute and oppress. Photography allows us to observe and avoid the return gaze, like the panopticon in Foucault's "Discipline and Punish". Nevertheless, some writers believe that Benjamin restored or recreated an aura around the ruins of childhood in original and non-reproducible objects, through unique expressions of individuality and constant descriptions of loss. The "photographic" apparatus and the contradictory nature of the aura are revealed, according to Rugg, in the deleted text of the fragment about the hunchbacked little man. The images of "a whole life" before the dying man's eyes allude to film frames, to the fact that the "movement" in the film is only our inability to perceive the transitions between frames. Likewise, the "whole life" as a whole narrative is an illusion, and the fragmented images of memory have gaps, like the gaps in the pages of a book. The hunchbacked man, Rugg writes, still appears in the text, even if he is invisible: absence is open to perception and reconstruction, disappearance can be noticed, and the magic of the aura can be felt and reconstructed.

Researchers have noted that in an early version of "The Otter" fragment (the Giesen edition began with it), Benjamin commented on two photographs: his own with his brother Georg and a childhood photograph of Kafka. In the final edition, these descriptions and any reference to them were removed, indicating on the one hand the destruction of the aura and on the other the erasure of all traces of identity, the negation of any photographic and institutional identification imposed by the state. Rugg therefore characterized "Berlin Childhood" as a "disguised photographic autobiography".

== Mimesis and semiotics ==
The child's mimetic ability to perceive and create similarities and analogies between the world of things and the world of signs is at the center of many fragments of Berlin Childhood. In the theoretical texts "Doctrine of the Similar" and "On the Mimetic Faculty," Benjamin explores the concepts of "extra-sensory similarity" and "mimetic ability. Similarity is an active form of behavior and mode of experience, and is not simply related to understanding or perception. Mimesis occurs in nature, but the ultimate producer of similarity is the human being. Mimesis has two aspects: ontogenetic and phylogenetic. The first relates to the development of the individual: the child has a unique ability to perceive reality through appearances, it has the natural experience of imitation, of imitating and becoming this or that, the gift of resemblance of things, furniture and clothes when it plays, the ability to transform itself into them; for example, the child tries to be not only a merchant, but also a miller or a train. This mode of perception precedes the separation of subject and object. "Berlin Childhood" considers the ontogenetic aspect. Through the mimetic faculty, the child grasps pre-representational forms of interpreting the world, a logic of "distorted likeness" that manifests itself in the world of things as well as in technology; it is not, however, a return to magic or animism. The phylogenetic aspect refers to human history: the mimetic capacity has been gradually transformed. In the beginning, people perceived reality through the experience of similarities (an example is clairvoyance), but in modern times, due to the mechanization of the lifeworld and the emergence of mass society in the 19th century, this experience is lost: new forms of perception and consciousness emerge under the influence of media. Only the rudiments of mimetic ability remain (the horoscope is an example) in language and writing. The latter represent "the most perfect archive of extra-sensory appearance".

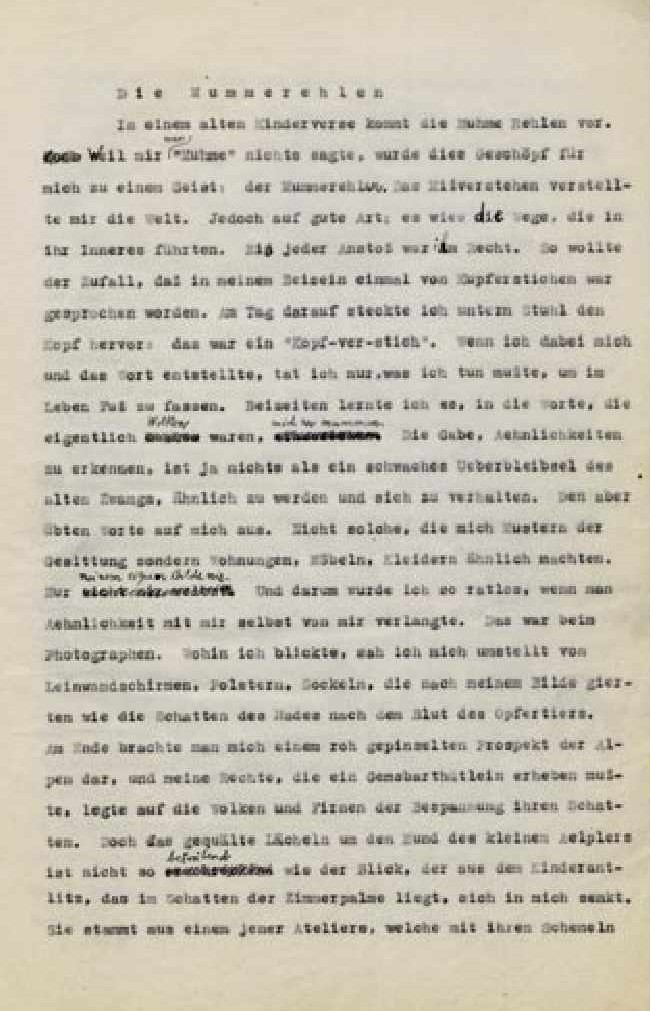
"The Otter"'s manuscript. Gisen edition

The mimetic character of language, its "magical" aspect, manifests itself only through its relation to something else; meaning ("pure language" in Benjamin's definition) is always only a relation between the modalities of meaning. In Benjamin's onomatopoetic theory of language, names or words are not subject to abstraction and therefore embody the highest degree of mimesis. According to Hamacher, the concept denies both the sensual similarity between word and meaning and the substantiality of meaning. Similarity occurs between words that cannot be reduced to signs, not between sign and denotatus, sign and representation. Similarity is not static, but is constantly generated in new ways, in Hamacher's phrase, like a calculus of modalities. The ability to perceive similarities depends on the mode of time —the pace or speed of reading— similarities flash for a moment in the flow of things and then disappear. In the text "The Otter", Benjamin explicitly refers to the doctrine of semblance:

Early on, I learned to disguise myself in words, which really were clouds. The gift of perceiving similarities is, in fact, nothing but a weak remnant of the old compulsion to become similar and to behave arithmetically. In me, this compulsion acted through words. Not those that made me similar to well-behaved children, but those that made me similar to dwelling places, furniture, clothes. I was distorted by similarity to all that surrounded me.

"The Otter" articulates a fundamental, in Lemke's words, "transcendental-poetic" principle. In reality, a productive linguistic misunderstanding or error onomatopoetically transformed Muhme Rehlen into Mummerehlen: "Listen to my story of the Mummerehlen." The line is distorted-yet it contains the whole distorted world of childhood. Muhme Rehlen, who place in the line, had already disappeared when I heard it for the first time. Obormotya's vanishing image is invisibly present in the text: "Berlin Childhood" contains many examples of such linguistic errors and distortions. They open up the world of a child to an adult. The unknown word Kupferstich becomes Kopf-verstich, (Note: Does not exist in the latest revision.) the Berlin suburb Steglitz becomes Stieglitz, gnä(dige) Frau becomes Näh-Frau, Markthalle becomes Mark-Thalle, and Blume-hof becomes Blume-zoof, by the same distorting logic. The logic of distorted similarity links the philosophy of language and the poetics of memory because it points to the nature of language itself: the poem about Obormotya was "distorted", but it contained the whole "distorted world of childhood". From this perspective, Benjamin's memories describe a reading capable of seeing traces of resemblance in the text as traces of memory. Lemke writes that only a concept of language that takes into account the dichotomies of representation and mimesis, meaning and materiality, can grasp the specificity of memory, its dialectic of forgetting and remembering, of dream and consciousness, of the secret and the uncanny.

"Berlin Childhood" does not negate the representational model of meaning production, but presents a semiotics of similarity based on the shifting and sliding of meaning from one medium to another. The distinction between Muhme Rehlen and Mummerehlen, according to Lemke, reflects the semiotic and magical sides of the language model. Mummerehlen is neither reducible to a concept nor to a clear referent, it cannot be fixed as a meaning or represented as a clearly defined image. The displacement of meaning in the child's encounter with unknown signifiers and indeterminate meanings does not lead to meaninglessness, but allows a fleeting glimpse of an extra-sensory resemblance, whose magical aspect in turn reveals the operation of the mimetic faculty. The child's perception opens the way to another dimension of the world, in which words and things are seen outside the instrumental context, and language, not yet a means of communication, is the medium of physical experience. Words are "clouds" in which one can wrap oneself and dissolve. Clouds of words form an environment of pre-rational appropriation, a "protective skin" against the hostile outside world. As Gagneben notes, distortions and shifts of meaning always point to unrecognized or repressed aspects, denied or repressed. In his famous treatment, Hamacher placed at the center of "Berlin Childhood" the image of a cloud or cloudiness of words; the cloud is not reduced to a word, a thing, a stable form, or a representation of an idea, but is the forgetting or "suspension" of an established meaning. The process of mimesis is never complete, but always produces displacements and rearrangements, generates interpretations, allEgorical resemblances, fragmentation: similarity is implied but never achieved; but the fact that the similarities are connected, albeit allEgorically, makes them and the text itself images of an always provisional and therefore always ironic mimesis.

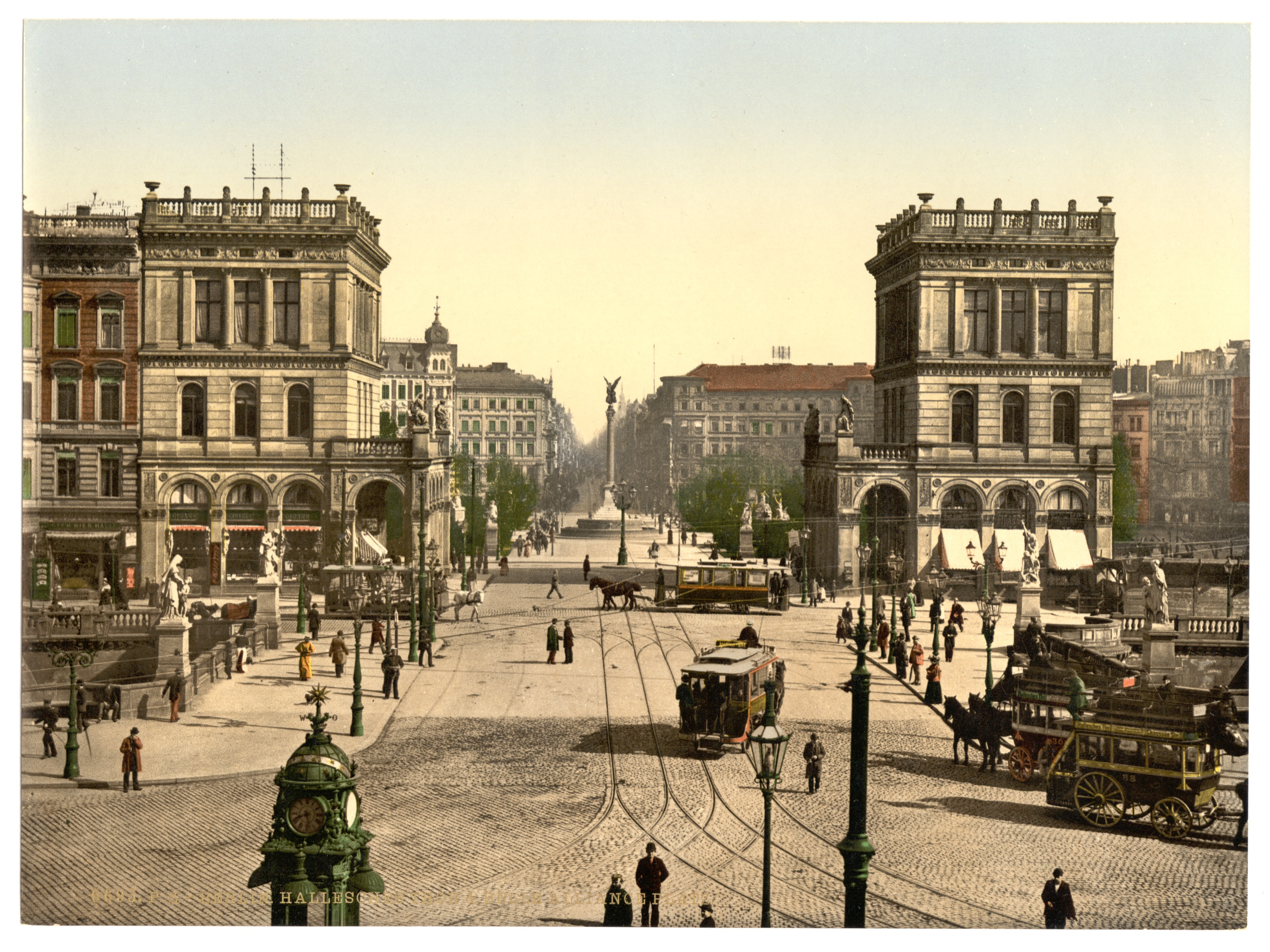
The Halle Gate, 1900s

In the space of childhood experience, every thing becomes a sign, and every sign can become a thing, reveal its material side. Such transformations and the fluidity of catEgories are developed by Benjamin into a literary strategy aimed, in the words of the literary and cultural studies scholar Heinz Bruggermann, at discovering elementary forms of reading as perception and appropriation. In "Boys' Books", learning to read is described as a slide from reading letter signs to reading textual symbols; in both forms, meanings are constantly shifting; Benjamin recalls standing out of a night window and a snowstorm telling him a story from books:

I could never fully understand what their story was about, for too often and too densely did new things invade what I had long known. As soon as I joined one company of snowflakes, I saw that it was already in a hurry to send me away to another that had come out of nowhere and broken ours. And now it was time to search through the blizzard of printed letters for the stories that had eluded me as I looked out the winter window. The distant lands I read about played in the circle like snowflakes.

Despite the initial enthusiasm, the conventional reading also fails to reveal the exact meaning of the story; this impossibility —the cloud of words— becomes the model for reading any text. The letter signs do not lead to semiotic clarity, but are subject to the principle of shifting or escaping meaning, their arbitrary structure resembling the continuous swirling of snowflakes. The child perceives the text as a material and spatial structure of letters and spaces that do not combine into meaningful signs, but are differentiated from one another. The child's experience of the threshold or boundary between semantics and image, meaning and materiality, is central to the texts "Two Enigmas" and "Winter Evening". In the first fragment, Benjamin recalls a postcard from a collection with the name of his schoolteacher, Helene Pufahl, written on the back. Lemke notes that a page of text reads like a picture or a painting. The writings break down into separate graphic components: letters ("p," "f," "l") that refer to the initial letters of other words. This ignores the usual semantic interpretation of both image and text; reading becomes a process of translation between the two. In the second fragment, the dim light of the gas lamps makes Benjamin think of an old postcard of a Berlin square that is unfamiliar to the child: neither the image nor its caption —"Halle Gate"— refers to a real referent, but the endless play between text and image, fiction and reality allows us to find "my memories of winter Berlin".

Mimesis is not reducible to linguistic structure, but is a form of perception and behavior, a bodily-sensual experience, that includes not only the story of the snowflakes but also the process of reading itself. In "Butterfly Hunt," Benjamin recalls catching moths on the Brauhausberg near Potsdam. (Note: Benjamin's parents had a summer house in Babelsberg.) The summer air is filled with the word "Brewery Hill" (Brauhausberg), the child likes the "air of the word" — the name becomes part of the bodily experience, it can be inhaled and "lived. In the fragment "The Fever", the stories "live" in the hands of the mother, who tells them to the sick child sitting on her bed. In both cases, the content of the stories eludes the listener; however, the combination of language and corporeality creates a wealth of experience and, according to cultural researcher and Benjamin scholar Bernd Kiefer, represents the "embryonic cell" of mimetic experience.

== Subject, identity and the political ==
In "Berlin Chronicle", Benjamin wrote:

If I write better in German than most writers of my generation, it's mostly because I've followed only one little rule for twenty years: never use the word "I" except in letters.

This "only one little rule" touches important themes in Benjamin's work: the proximity and contradiction between the collective and the individual, language and identity, subject and object. The dissertation raises the problem of the simultaneous presence and absence of the subject in Benjamin's work and proposes an investigation not so much of the identity of the author as of the very possibility of the existence of the self in modernity. In questioning the autobiographical self, Benjamin criticizes the autonomy and self-determination of the modern subject, both in its Enlightenment version (unity in Hegel) and in fascism as an ideology of unity. For Benjamin, the notion of a holistic subject is not only an illusion, but also an outdated form of reflection. Benjamin associated the categories of "personality," "individuality," or "character" with fascism and their dissolution with positive liberation. As Richter notes, on the threshold of the twentieth century, the bourgeois subject is in crisis, disintegrating because, on the one hand, it is determined by new cultural mechanisms, new technologies of communication and media (photography, phonograph, cinema); on the other hand, it is subjected to external forces — the state, society, and the historical situation. (Note: In Rugg's opinion, this aspect is expressed in the image of the dwarf.) As Gilloch summarizes, the Berlin texts constitute a prehistory of the modern subject, an archaeology of the bourgeois self as a disillusioned, frustrated urbanite.

The modern subject represents a "strange form" of human life, characterized by ruptures, fluctuations, and displacements. The fragmented subject eludes completion and closure even as it strives for them. Benjamin records the disintegration of the traditional subject through aesthetics: the destruction of the harmonious unity of the symbol and the splitting in allegory of the categories of cognition-subject and object. The experience of the deconstruction of the subject in modernity became a biographical reality due to the threat of exile, which forced Benjamin to rework the text contrary to his original conception. As Witte suggests, the original construction of "Berlin Childhood" was Benjamin's means of self-defense and defense of his own identity against the mortal threat of rising fascism at the end of the bourgeois era. Downing notes that in Benjamin's photographic model of memory, the subject is dissolved rather than formed. The disappearance of the subject is tied to time: whereas in Proust, Freud, or Mann the vestiges of consistency-the disclosure and development of the subject-remain, Benjamin denies any temporal orientation or progressive flow of time (cultural or individual). This aspect complicates Benjamin's model by destabilizing the links between past, present and future. Benjamin also refuses to turn to mythology, to archaic images of the past (Jensen, fascist theorists). He de-psychologizes the notion of the subject, insisting on historical and social context — this approach is directed against the reduction of the subject to psychology and biology (Freud, Jensen). The place of the subject is taken by photographic, everyday and external images that are not eternal, mythical and profound.

Benjamin eliminates the linguistic "Ego" from memory: the displacement of the "Ego" conditions the possibility of producing the text as a network or labyrinth; linear narrative as a condition for the constitution of the "Ego" is denied. Adorno believed that for Benjamin, the fall of the subject meant the liberation of the individual, but it also entailed anti-subjectivism. In poststructuralist interpretations, this departure from homogeneous identity has been compared to Paul de Man's autobiographical concept of the "erasure of the face. Much of Benjamin's work clearly overlaps with de Mann's construction of a "new face" and is reminiscent of deconstructive techniques. While de Man focused on the aesthetic play of signifiers, Benjamin was not interested in the abolition of the subject, but in its differentiation and transgression. Benjamin's conception of subjectivity, with its blurred contours of the subject, places the self in a state of constant transit, of transition. From this point of view, the problem of identity formation remains at the center of the poetics of Benjamin's memoirs, even though Berlin Childhood is not an autobiography in the sense of a chronological account of one's own life. The text unfolds within the contradiction between the desire to construct the subject through the act of writing and the rejection of such a project; between the search for possible forms of identity and the attempts to escape from any external identification. Haustein notes the connection with Jacques Lacan's concept: "The imaginary refers to the subject's relationship to the identifications that form it, the dissolution of which leaves the Ego a mere image. The Ego is no longer the original cause, but follows from language and writing; thus, when Benjamin writes in the first person, it is only the imaginary form of the Ego. As Lemke summarizes, the construction of the subject in autobiographical narrative is determined by the logic of distorted resemblance and is therefore always accompanied by fragmentation, dissipation, postponement (in Derrida's terms). Rapid temporal and spatial transformations create a linguistic "I" that undermines the logic of identity and stable identification. The "I" does not take a clear form, but wraps itself in text, like a child in words ("mummerehlen").

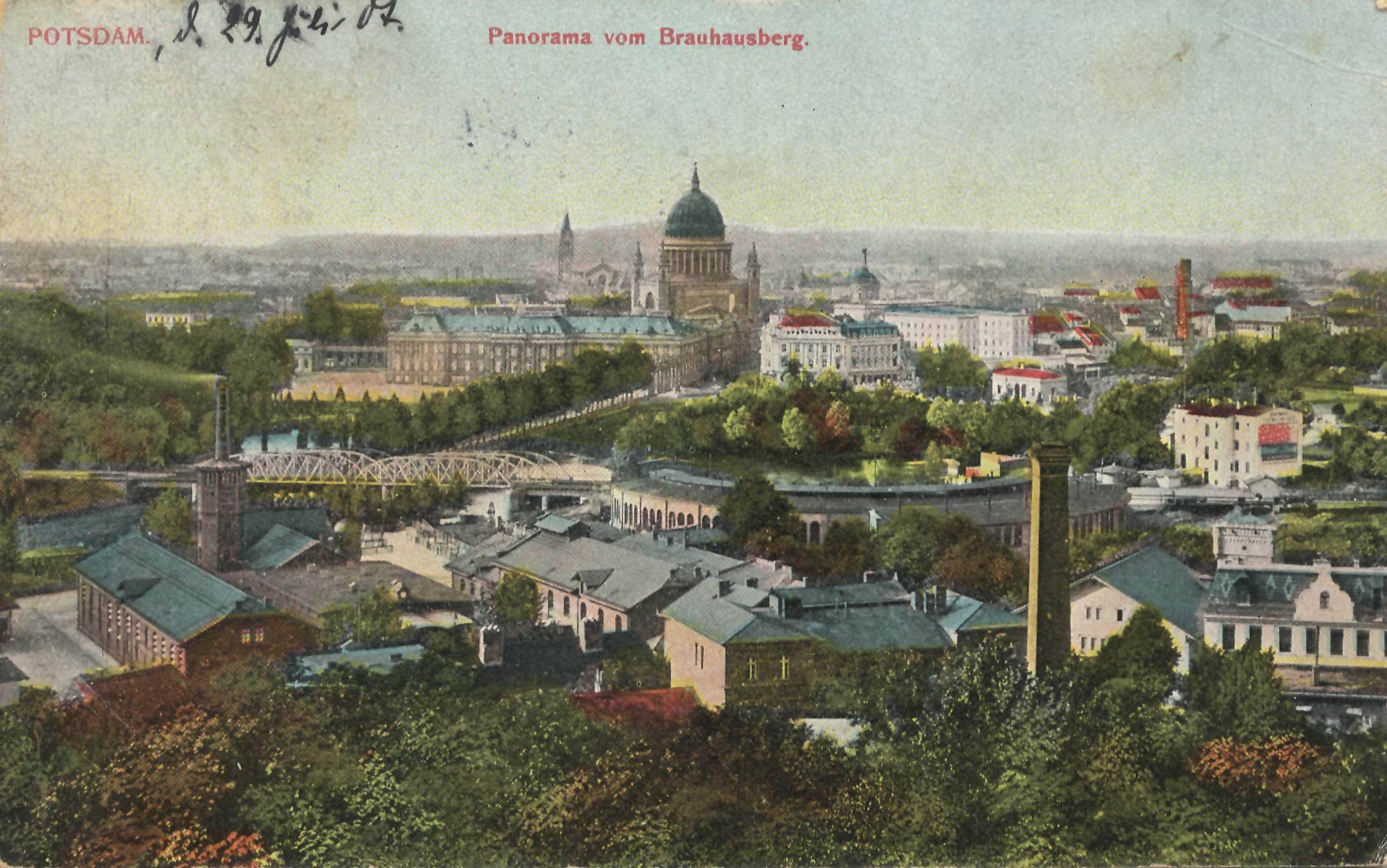
View of Potsdam from the Brauhausberg mountain, 1907

The traditional subject-object dichotomy is destroyed by the strategies of disguise and appropriation that form the basis of the constitution of the subject in modernity. An example of this behavior is the child's mimetic ability to adapt to the environment through play, its desire for transformation. The child enters into a close relationship with things, it does not observe the object from the outside, but takes possession of it and becomes part of it. The child's desire to "dissolve into light and air, only to sneak up unnoticed and seize the prey" ("Butterfly Hunt") is replaced by the opposite: the hunter becomes the victim, because the hunter becomes the prey:

the more I strove to conform, in all the fibers of my being, to the animal — the more butterfly-like I became in my heart and soul-the more this butterfly itself, in everything it did, took on the color of human volition; and in the end, it was as if its capture was the price I had to pay to regain my human existence.

Mimesis blurs the distinction between human and natural, subject and object, child and thing. The magical power of things suddenly takes possession of the child, banishing its ego. The child merges with the butterfly into a homogeneous entity, and it is only thanks to its "prey" that the process of mimesis nonviolently succeeds: the human "I" does not disappear, but, on the contrary, reappears. The new "I" appears outside the clear subject-object dichotomy, emerging from an unstable outer shell. This "I" never coincides with its own image and is never itself. The becoming of the subject consists of endless mimetic transformations. Mimesis, however, carries the risk of mortal danger in the case of external identification ("Hiding Places"). During a game of hide-and-seek, a child fears being discovered when he or she transforms into a white ghost behind a curtain or a wooden idol under the dinner table:

Whoever discovered me could hold me petrified as an idol under the table, could weave me as a ghost for all time into the curtain, confine me for life within the heavy door.

The only way to escape the deadly paralysis of the external gaze, Lemke concludes, remains the constant flight of the "Ego" from the world of things. Haustein, drawing on Lacan's concept of the "gaze," suggested that "Berlin Childhood" is based on the conflict between two modes of gaze through which the subject is constructed or deconstructed — the observing and the reciprocal, the latter defining Benjamin's concept of identity. According to Haustein, in both authors the "photographic" observing gaze is impersonal, precedes the subject, suggests depersonalization and even deanthropomorphization. While the Lacanian model is transhistorical, Benjamin emphasizes historical and technical change, which brings him closer to Marxism. The observing gaze is associated with relations of power and subordination, with an ideology that demands self-identity, with the blinding gaze of the camera; the reciprocal gaze with intersubjectivity, openness to the image of the other and movement into "Ego". The latter thesis is confirmed by Benjamin's implicit identification with Kafka's childhood photograph, as commentators have pointed out: (Note: In Witte's interpretation, the identification with Kafka illustrates the thesis of the social conditioning of the individual in a particular historical period. Witte's interpretation does not explain why Benjamin removed references to the photographs in a later editions.) the narrator penetrates the image and becomes its "Ego" erasing the boundaries of time, space, and individuality. Contrary to the delineation of the boundaries of personal identity, the merging of the two authors into a single image opens up the possibility of perceiving extra-sensory similarities.

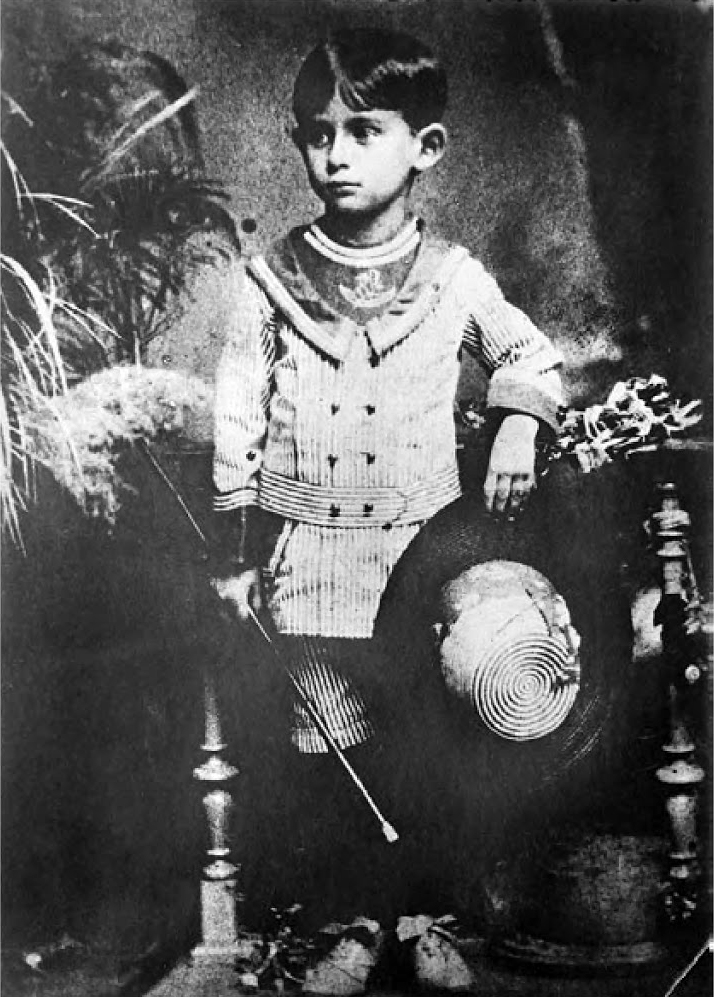
Franz Kafka, 1887

"Berlin Childhood" is less politicized than "Chronicle." Scholem, expressing a popular view, considered the later work a "literary metamorphosis" in which class politics almost dissolved into Benjamin's "softer," "even more forgiving" view of his childhood. There were almost no references to the political or theses on proletarian resistance or struggle, no mention of "unorthodox Marxism" or "dialectical materialism". Nevertheless, critics such as Gerhard Richter or Jeanne-Marie Gagneben believed that Benjamin's memoir touched on the political implicitly, through thought-images. On the one hand, political aspects stemmed from the emergence of mass technologies, above all cinematography and photography. On the other hand, political images are linked to the deconstruction of the modern subject and are inseparable from images of the unconscious. From Richter's point of view, Berlin Childhood represents a confrontation with Hitler's ideology of the cult of the "unified national body" ("Mein Kampf"), which has a concrete and unchanging political meaning.Since, for Benjamin, "language owns the body and the body owns language," the corporeal subject in autobiography constantly oscillates between construction and dissimulation. Images of corporeality as a site of political struggle connect politics, history, and rhetoric in complex ways, even when they do not explicitly refer to political and historical issues. Benjamin does not explain political concepts, but embodies them through a transgressive movement in language, according to the author's theory of allegory: the political can only be expressed in something else, indirectly, allegorically. The fluidity of meaning, the lack of finality and stable identity aim to create concepts that cannot be appropriated by fascism. Richter's interpretation has been criticized for ignoring temporality —"hope in the past"— the construction and deconstruction of the corporeal subject turns out to be an ahistorical process. The emphasis on the negative (or nihilistic) aspect of Benjamin's politics has also been criticized as flawed.

According to Gagnében, in Berlin Childhood Benjamin offers a conception of the political subject that is not reduced to the affirmation of the conscious "ego", that is open to involuntariness and spontaneity (Proust) and the psyche of the unconscious (Freud), and that is in touch with the waves of collective desire, revolutions, and despair. Deprived of a stable identity and definitive representations, Benjamin's subject, according to Gagnében, "dares to assert itself in uncertainty. The socio-psychological and political extension of the notion of the subject is linked to an actual reflection on historical practice-how people tell history and how they act to change history. This logic must avoid the pitfalls of a victorious individualism, an autonomous consciousness subject only to the rules of language. Gagnében links the dissolution of the former and the emergence of a new subject to Paul Ricoeur's concept of narrative identity, which distinguishes between identity (idem) and self (ipse). If idem denotes immutability and continuity, ipse denotes the subject of language and action; ipse is a key category of history, referring to both the realm of narrative and the realm of events (collective or individual) and allowing us to reflect on the time of utterance and the time of ethical and political action. As Downing concerns, in arguing against the construction of the subject in modernity, Benjamin insisted on isolating the child's mimetic experience, severing all teleological and genetic ties to the adult world. Such a perspective was clearly utopian, but in Downing's view still practical, beyond pedagogy, education, and individual psychology (especially psychoanalysis). Benjamin saw hope in ruins and fragments, not only for children but also for adults, but the future, Downing concludes, turned out to be quite different-a picture of total destruction.
