= Folk religion =

Expressions of religion distinct from the doctrines of organized religion

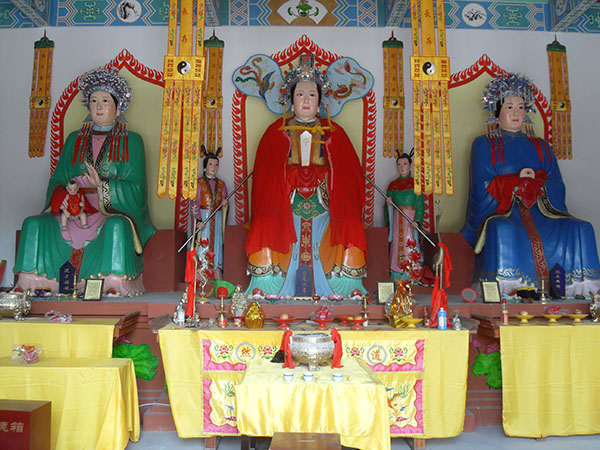
Shrine of Bixia at Mount Tai, Shandong, associated with Chinese folk religion

Folk religion, traditional religion, or vernacular religion comprises, according to religious studies and folkloristics, various forms and expressions of religion that are distinct from the doctrines and practices of organized religion. The precise definition of folk religion varies among scholars. Sometimes also termed popular belief, it consists of ethnic or regional religious customs under the umbrella of a religion; but outside doctrine and practices.

The term "folk religion" is generally held to encompass two related but separate subjects. The first is the religious dimension of folk culture (folklore), or the folk-cultural dimensions of religion. The second refers to the study of religious syncretism between two cultures with different stages of formal expression, such as the melange of African folk beliefs and Roman Catholicism that led to the development of Vodun and Santería, and similar mixtures of formal religions with folk cultures. In China, folk Protestantism had its origins with the Taiping Rebellion.

Chinese folk religion, folk Hinduism, folk Christianity, and folk Islam are examples of folk religion associated with major religions. The term is also used, especially by the clergy of the faiths involved, to describe the desire of people who otherwise infrequently attend religious worship, do not belong to a church or similar religious society, and who have not made a formal profession of faith in a particular creed, to have religious weddings or funerals, or (among Christians) to have their children baptised.

== Definition ==
In The Concise Oxford Dictionary of World Religions, John Bowker characterized "folk religion" as either "religion which occurs in small, local communities which does not adhere to the norms of large systems" or "the appropriation of religious beliefs and practices at a popular level." Folk religion is sometimes termed "diffused religion," or "popular religion."

Don Yoder argued that there were five separate ways of defining folk religion. The first was a perspective rooted in a cultural evolutionary framework which understood folk religion as representing the survivals of older forms of religion; in this, it would constitute "the survivals, in an official religious context, of beliefs and behaviour inherited from earlier stages of the culture's development". This definition would view folk religion in Catholic Europe as the survivals of pre-Christian religion and the folk religion in Protestant Europe as the survivals of Medieval Catholicism. The second definition identified by Yoder was the view that folk religion represented the mixture of an official religion with forms of ethnic religion; this was employed to explain the place of folk religion in the syncretic belief systems of the Americas, where Christianity had blended with the religions of indigenous American and African communities.

Yoder's third definition was that often employed within folkloristics, which held that folk religion was "the interaction of belief, ritual, custom, and mythology in traditional societies", representing that which was often pejoratively characterised as superstition. The fourth definition provided by Yoder stated that folk religion represented the "folk interpretation and expression of religion". Noting that this definition would not encompass beliefs that were largely unconnected from organised religion, such as in witchcraft, he therefore altered this definition by including the concept of "folk religiosity", thereby defining folk religion as "the deposit in culture of folk religiosity, the full range of folk attitudes to religion". His fifth and final definition represented a "practical working definition" that combined elements from these various other definitions. Thus, he summarized folk religion as "the totality of all those views and practices of religion that exist among the people apart from and alongside the strictly theological and liturgical forms of the official religion".

Yoder described "folk religion" as existing "in a complex society in relation to and in tension with the organized religion(s) of that society. Its relatively unorganized character differentiates it from organized religion".

Alternately, the sociologist of religion Matthias Zic Varul defined "folk religion" as "the relatively un-reflected aspect of ordinary practices and beliefs that are oriented towards, or productive of, something beyond the immediate here-and-now: everyday transcendence".

Folk religion is typically not highly institutionalized. Its practitioners typically do not form religious communities independent of the broader social communities.

In sociology, folk religion is often contrasted with elite religion. Folk religion is defined as the beliefs, practices, rituals and symbols originating from sources other than the religion's leadership. Folk religion in many instances is tolerated by the religion's leadership, although they may consider it an error. A similar concept is lived religion, the study of religion as practiced by believers.

The term folk religion came to be increasingly rejected in the 1990s and 2000s by scholars seeking more precise terminology.

=== Problems with the term folk religion ===
Yoder noted that one problem with the use of the term folk religion was that it did not fit into the work of those scholars who used the term "religion" in reference solely to organized religion. He highlighted the example of the prominent sociologist of religion Émile Durkheim, who insisted that religion was organized in order to contrast it with magic. Yoder noted that scholars adopting these perspectives often preferred the term "folk belief" over "folk religion".

A second problem with the use of the term folk religion that Yoder highlighted was that some scholars, particularly those operating in the sociology of religion, used the term as a synonym for ethnic religion (which is alternately known as national religion or tribal religion), meaning a religion closely tied to a particular ethnic or national group and is thus contrasted with a "universal religion" which cuts across ethnic and national boundaries. Among the scholars to have adopted this use of terminology are E. Wilbur Bock.

The folklorist Leonard Norman Primiano argued that the use of the term folk religion, as well as related terms like "popular religion" and "unofficial religion", by scholars, does an extreme disservice to the forms of religiosity that scholars are examining, because – in his opinion – such terms are "residualistic, [and] derogatory". He argued that using such terminology implies that there is "a pure element" to religion "which is in some way transformed, even contaminated, by its exposure to human communities". As a corrective, he suggested that scholars use "vernacular religion" as an alternative. Defining this term, Primiano stated that "vernacular religion" is, "by definition, religion as it is lived: as human beings encounter, understand, interpret, and practice it. Since religion inherently involves interpretation, it is impossible for the religion of an individual not to be vernacular".

Kapaló was critical of this approach, deeming it mistaken and arguing that switching from "folk religion" to "vernacular religion" results in the scholar "picking up a different selection of things from the world". He cautioned that both terms carried an "ideological and semantic load" and warned scholars to pay attention to the associations that each word had.

Many Latin American scholars of religion use the concept of "popular religiosity", though the term applies beyond the region. Local scholars prefer "popular religion" over "folkloric" because, in the Latin American context, folk religion is not confined to a single religious identity; it encompasses a wide range of devotions, from indigenous spiritualities to popular Catholic traditions.

== Historical study ==
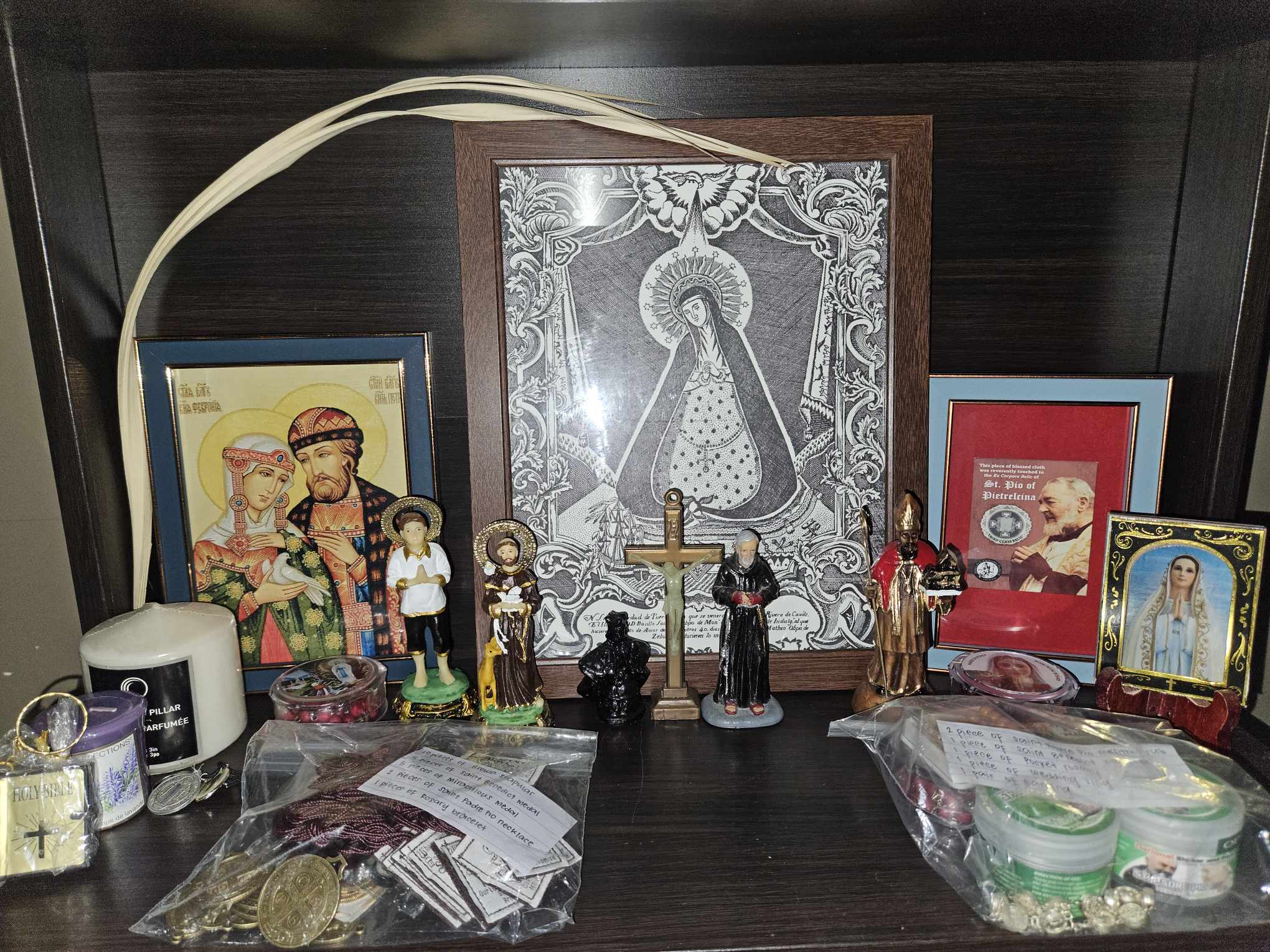
A Filipino Catholic home altar in Morden, Manitoba

In Europe the study of "folk religion" emerged from the study of religiöse Volkskunde, a German term which was used in reference to "the religious dimension of folk-culture, or the folk-cultural dimension of religion". This term was first employed by a German Lutheran preacher, Paul Drews, in a 1901 article that he published which was titled "Religiöse Volkskunde, eine Aufgabe der praktischen Theologie". This article was designed to be read by young Lutheran preachers leaving the seminary, to equip them for the popular variants of Lutheranism that they would encounter among their congregations and which would differ from the official, doctrinal Lutheranism that they had been accustomed to. Although developing within a religious environment, the term came to be adopted by German academics in the field of folkloristics. During the 1920s and 1930s, theoretical studies of religiöse Volkskunde had been produced by the folklorists Josef Weigert, Werner Boette, and Max Rumpf, all of whom had focused on religiosity within German peasant communities. Over the coming decades, Georg Schreiber established an Institut für religiöse Volkskund in Munich while a similar department was established in Salzburg by Hanns Koren. Other prominent academics involved in the study of the phenomenon were Heinrich Schauert and Rudolf Kriss, the latter of whom collected one of the largest collections of folk-religious art and material culture in Europe, later housed in Munich's Bayerisches Nationalmuseum. Throughout the 20th century, many studies were made of folk religion in Europe, paying particular attention to such subjects as pilgrimage and the use of shrines.

In the Americas, the study of folk religion developed among cultural anthropologists studying the syncretistic cultures of the Caribbean and Latin America. The pioneer in this field was Robert Redfield, whose 1930 book Tepoztlán: A Mexican Village contrasted and examined the relationship between "folk religion" and "official religion" in a peasant community. Yoder later noted that although the earliest known usage of the term "folk religion" in the English language was unknown, it probably developed as a translation of the German Volksreligion. One of the earliest prominent usages of the term was in the title of Joshua Trachtenberg's 1939 work Jewish Magic and Superstition: A Study in Folk Religion. The term also gained increasing usage within the academic field of comparative religion, appearing in the titles of Ichiro Hori's Folk Religion in Japan, Martin P. Nilsson's Greek Folk Religion, and Charles Leslie's reader, the Anthropology of Folk Religion. Courses on the study of folk religion came to be taught at various universities in the United States, such as John Messenger's at Indiana University and Don Yoder's at the University of Pennsylvania. Although the subject of folk religion fell within the remit of scholars operating in both folkloristics and religious studies, by 1974 Yoder noted that U.S.-based academics in the latter continued to largely ignore it, instead focusing on the study of theology and institutionalised religion; he contrasted this with the situation in Europe, where historians of religion had devoted much time to studying folk religiosity. He also lamented that many U.S.-based folklorists also neglected the subject of religion because it did not fit within the standard genre-based system for cataloguing folklore.

== Chinese folk religion ==
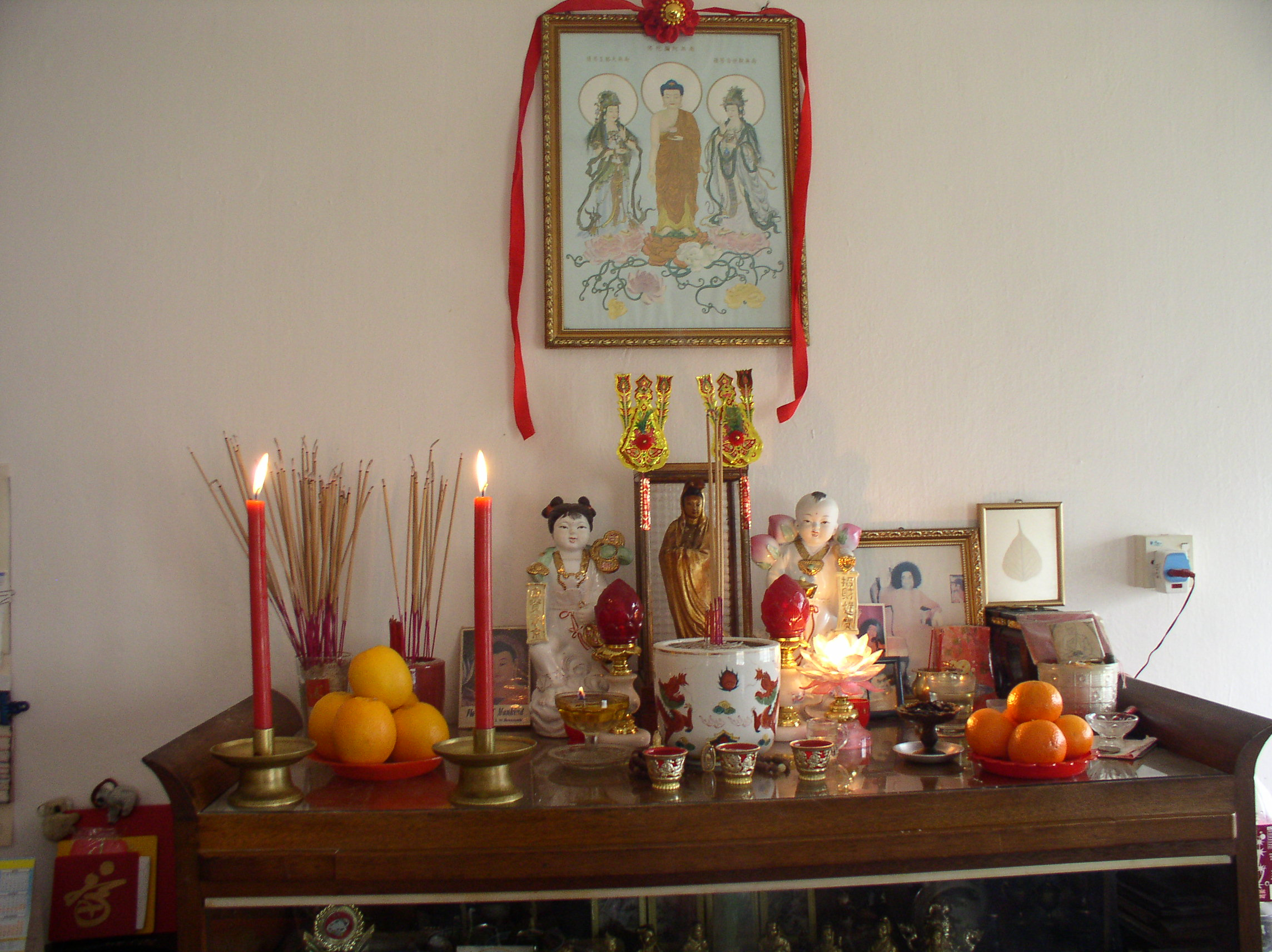
This picture was taken at a Malaysian Chinese home. This altar is dedicated to the three Pure Land sages, Avalokitesvara, and Sathya Sai Baba. On the left of the altar is a glass filled with rice. Joss sticks are stuck into it after the ancestors are invited to partake in the offering of food specially prepared for them on the Hungry Ghost festival prayers.

"Chinese folk religion" is one of the labels used to describe the collection of ethnic religious traditions which have historically comprised the predominant belief system in China and among Han Chinese ethnic groups up to the present day. The devotion includes the veneration of the dead (ancestor worship) and of forces of nature, exorcism of demonic forces, and a belief in the rational order of nature, balance in the universe and reality that can be influenced by human beings and their rulers, as well as spirits and gods. Worship is devoted to a hierarchy of gods and immortals (Chinese: 神; pinyin: shén), who can be deities of phenomena, of human behaviour, or progenitors of lineages. Stories regarding some of these gods are collected into the body of Chinese mythology. By the 11th century (Song period), these practices had been blended with Buddhist ideas of karma (one's own doing) and rebirth, and Taoist teachings about hierarchies of deities, to form the popular religious system which has lasted in many ways until the present day.

Chinese folk religion is sometimes categorized with Taoism, since over the centuries institutional Taoism has been attempting to assimilate or administer local religions. More accurately, Taoism emerged from and overlaps with folk religion and Chinese philosophy. Chinese folk religion is sometimes seen as a constituent part of Chinese traditional religion, but more often, the two are regarded as synonymous. With around 454 million adherents, or about 6.6% of the world population, Chinese folk religion is one of the major religious traditions in the world. In the People's Republic of China, more than 30% of the population follows Chinese popular religion or Taoism.

Despite being heavily suppressed during the last two centuries, from the Taiping Rebellion to the Cultural Revolution, it is currently experiencing a modern revival in both Mainland China and Taiwan. Various forms have received support by the Government of the People's Republic of China, such as Mazuism in Southern China (officially about 160 million Chinese people are worshippers of Mazu), Huangdi worship, Black Dragon worship in Shaanxi, and Cai Shen worship.

The term Shenism was first published by AJA Elliot in 1955 to describe Chinese folk religion in Southeast Asia.

== Folk Judaism ==
In one of the first major academic works on the subject, Joshua Trachtenberg, in Jewish Magic and Superstition: A Study in Folk Religion, defined Jewish folk religion as consisting of ideas and practices that, whilst not meeting with the approval of religious leaders, enjoyed wide popularity such that they must be included in what he termed the "field of religion". This included unorthodox beliefs about demons and angels and magical practices.

Later studies have emphasized the significance of the destruction of the Temple in Jerusalem to the many Jewish folk customs linked to mourning and, in particular, to the belief in hibbut ha-qever (torture of the grave): a belief that the dead are tortured in their grave for three days after burial by demons until they remember their names. This idea began with early eschatological aggadot (אגדות, 'legends', 'narratives') and was further developed by the Kabbalists.

Raphael Patai is recognized as an early adopter of anthropology in studying Jewish folk religion. In particular, he was drawn to the female divine element, which he noted in the goddess Asherah, the Shekhinah, the Matronit, and Lilith.

Writer Stephen Sharot has noted that Jewish folk religion, similar to other forms of folk religion, focuses on apotropaic and thaumaturgical practices intended to protect individuals from sickness and misfortune. He highlights the distinction between Rabbinic Judaism, which adheres to orthodox practice, life, and Halakha, and the unorthodox magical rituals practitioners employ in everyday life. An example mentioned is the relatively professionalized magicians known as the Baal Shem (בַּעַל שֵׁם; pl. Baalei Shem) in Poland. Beginning in the 16th century and gaining prominence alongside Practical Kabbalah in the 18th century, Ba'alei Shem utilized their knowledge of the names of God and angels, along with various practices such as exorcism, chiromancy, and herbal medicine to assist individuals in achieving success in social areas like marriage and childbirth, and to bring harm to adversaries.

Charles Liebman has written that the essence of the folk religion of American Jews is their social ties to one another, illustrated by the finding that religious practices that would prevent social integration—such as a strict interpretation of Kashrut and Shabbat—have been abandoned, whilst the practices that are followed—such as the Passover Seder, social rites of passage like the b'nei mitzvah, and the High Holy Days—are ones that strengthen Jewish family and community integration. Liebman described the rituals and beliefs of contemporary Jewish folk religion in his works, The Ambivalent American Jew (1973) and American Jewry: Identity and Affiliation.

== Folk Christianity ==
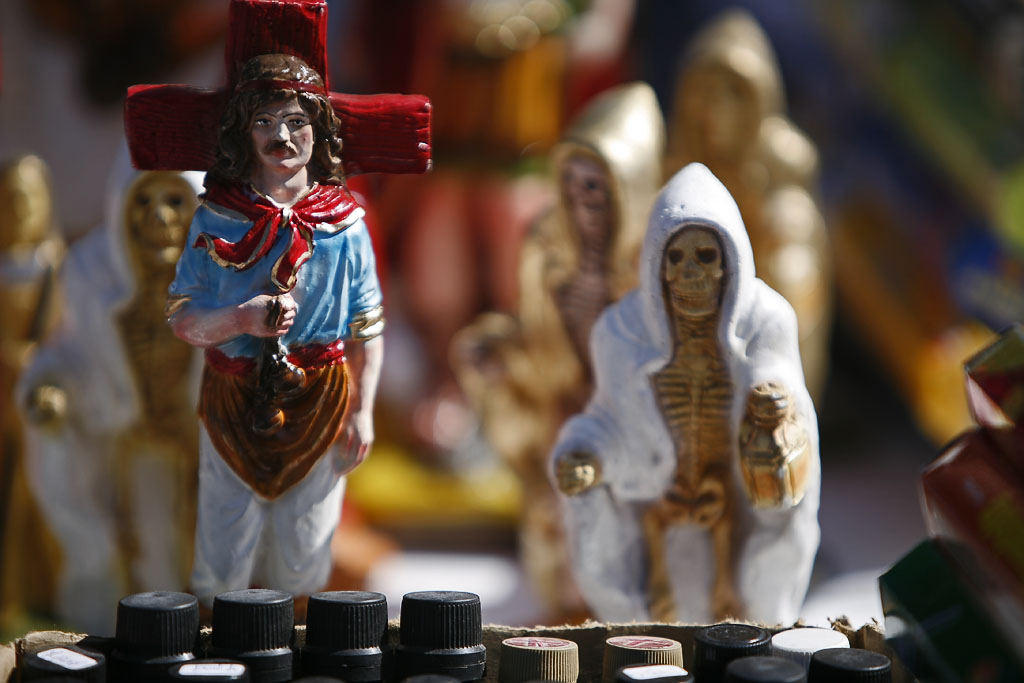
Gauchito Gil (left) and San La Muerte (right), two examples of Argentine folk saints

Folk Christianity is defined differently by various scholars. Christianity as most people live it – a term used to "overcome the division of beliefs into mainstream and heterodox".

Christianity as impacted by superstition as practiced by certain geographical Christian groups, and Christianity defined "in cultural terms without reference to the theologies and histories."

== Folk Islam ==
"Folk Islam" is an umbrella term used to collectively describe forms of Islam that incorporate native folk beliefs and practices. Folk Islam has been described as the Islam of the "urban poor, country people, and tribes", in contrast to orthodox or "high" Islam (Gellner, 1992). Sufi concepts, which are found in orthodox Islam as well, and perennialism and syncretism are often integrated into folk Islam.

== Folk Hinduism ==
June McDaniel (2007) classifies Hinduism into six major kinds and numerous minor kinds, in order to understand the expression of emotions among the Hindus. According to McDaniel, one of the major kinds is Folk Hinduism, based on local ethnic traditions and cults of local deities and is the oldest, non-literate system of Indian religions. Folk Hinduism involves worship of deities which are not found in Hindu scriptures. It involves worship of Gramadevata (village deity), Kuladevata (household deity) and local deities. It is a folk religion, polytheist and animistic belief based on locality. These religions have their own priests, who worship regional deities.

During the 19th century, scholars had divided Hinduism and Brahmanism. Brahmanism was referred to as an intellectual, classical tradition based on Sanskrit scriptures, while Hinduism was associated with superstitious folk tradition. The folk tradition refers to the aspects of the Hindu tradition that exist in tension with the Sanskritic tradition based on textual authority. According to M. N. Srinivas (1976), folk Hinduism is relevant in the urban context, but it is neglected in ethnographic studies due to its negative connotations with folk (rural masses, illiterate). According to Chris Fuller (1994), popular Hinduism is not degenerate textual Hinduism in light of ethnographic evidence, although the category of folk Hinduism remains tenuous. According to Michael Witzel (1998), the folk religion is the religion of Prakrit speaking and Dravidian speaking lower caste while the Vedic Hinduism which comprises Vedas and Upanishads is the religion of Sanskrit speaking upper caste. According to Asko Parpola (2015), the folk village Hinduism is surviving from pre-rig vedic Indo-Aryan times and the Indus Valley Civilization culture.

== Indigenous Philippine folk religions ==
Indigenous Philippine folk religions are the distinct native religions of various ethnic groups in the Philippines, where most follow belief systems in line with animism. Generally, these indigenous folk religions are referred to as Anitism or Bathalism. Some of these beliefs stem from pre-Christian religions that were especially influenced by Hinduism and were regarded by the Spanish as "myths" and "superstitions" in an effort to de-legitimize legitimate precolonial beliefs by forcefully replacing those native beliefs with Catholic Christian beliefs. Today, some of these precolonial beliefs are still held by Filipinos, especially in the provinces.

== See also ==
- Evil eye – Curse brought by a malevolent glare
- Ethnoreligious group – Ethnic group also unified by a common religion
- List of religions
  - List of ethnic religions
- Perceptions of religious imagery in natural phenomena
- Popular piety – Expressions of folk Catholicism
- Prehistoric religion – Religion before written records
- Pseudoreligion – Non-mainstream philosophical movement which functions like a religion
- Romani folklore – Folktales, myths, oral traditions, and legends of the Romani people
- Sanamahism – Indigenous religion of the Meitei people
- Spiritual Christianity – Russian religious movement, non-Orthodox
- Tengrism – Religion of the Eurasian steppe nations
