= The Origin of German Tragic Drama =

Book by Walter Benjamin

- English cover
- Author: Walter Benjamin
- Language: German
- Subject: Philosophy, Philosophy of History, Metaphysics, Post-metaphysics, Theology, After-theology, Metalogic, History, Kabbalah, Nihilism, Contra-Nihilism, Epistemology, Criticism, Polemic, literary criticism, Critical theory, History and Philosophy of Science, Dramaturgy, Performance theory, Proleptic Exemplar, German Idealism, Contra-German Idealism, Demonology, Art history, Art, Ars Memoriae, Antifascism

The Origin of German Tragic Drama (German: Ursprung des deutschen Trauerspiels) was the postdoctoral major academic work (habilitation) submitted by Walter Benjamin to the University of Frankfurt in 1925. The book is a study of German drama during the baroque period and was meant to earn Benjamin the qualification required to become a university instructor. Warned of the certainty of the work's rejection, Benjamin withdrew it from consideration. “He did not know as yet that ‘intellect cannot be habilitated,‘ to quote [a colleague's] wickedly insolent statement about him.”

This bon mot—‘Intellect cannot be habilitated’—went on to become a maxim about the paradoxes of professionalism in the academic humanities later on in the century, in the wake of Benjamin’s posthumous fame.

The book was rediscovered in the second half of the 20th century and has come to be considered a paradigm shifting work in the history of critical theory, the philosophy of history, and in European thought writ large. It had a deep influence on many works that became widely important before the Ursprung itself was recalled for general consideration by scholars in many fields including (but not limited to): The Origins of Totalitarianism, Dialectic of the Enlightenment and Major Trends in Jewish Mysticism.

The “Horror of origins” as a hallmark of resistance to totalitarianism in the philosophy of history, finds its root running through this book before it flowers from the small and hermetic circle of his early readers: Adorno, Horkheimer, Arendt, and Scholem.

== History ==
Benjamin compiled the source material for the work that would become The Origin of German Tragic Drama, some 600 quotations from German baroque dramas, in the Berlin State Library in 1923.

In the spring of 1924, as the Beer Hall Putsch trial prosecuting Hitler and his co-conspirators proceeded in the headlines, Benjamin fled Germany in the wake of an excruciatingly bad review of his translation of Baudelaire.

The eviscerating critique of this debut effort by an early-career Benjamin, appearing on the front-page of several newspapers, had been served up by his Viennese doppelgänger whose major continental celebrity presented an inverse image of Benjamin's own career trajectory: Stefan Zweig (the globally best-selling author, playwright, librettist and acclaimed editorial journalist who was himself a recent translator of Baudelaire).

After the review was syndicated and appeared on page one of his own home turf at the Frankfurter Zeitung (where he worked as a stringer), sliding by under the radar of his sympathetic boss Siegfried Kracauer at the editor's desk of the paper's arts page, Benjamin decided that he would have to split town to polish off the book he had been working on.

Absconding to Capri with his voluminously annotated extracts and early drafts, he began to compile and compose these fragments into a unified book on the theme of Trauerspiel for what he hoped would be his habilitation—the qualification that would allow him to become a university lecturer in Germany.

While on the island of Capri he made the acquaintance of Asja Lācis and Bertolt Brecht. These meetings—especially his introduction to Lācis—informed his sudden conversion from casual dilettante in Marxist theory to committed dilettante in the same field, right in the middle of his project on the German Baroque. This shift in Benjamin's theoretical disposition accounts for several of the Ursprung's formal oddities.

He finished and submitted the work for approval to the Philosophical Faculty at the University of Frankfurt in 1925. The faculty, which included established academics like Max Horkheimer, found the work impenetrable and urged Benjamin to withdraw it from consideration.

By 1931, it was being taught as a recurring seminar by a young all-star Privatdozent named Adorno, who quickly received promotion and tenure in the process of teaching the book at the same university where it was rejected as Benjamin's habilitation. The seminar may in this sense be considered the inaugural seminar of the Institute for Social Research, since the circle that gathered around Adorno during this time eventually branched off into its own academy.

Benjamin indicates in a letter to Gershom Scholem, sent in January 1933, that Adorno “continues to teach the course” on German tragedy, “though it is no longer listed in the course catalog.” Later that month, Adolf Hitler was appointed chancellor of Germany.

== Style & scope ==
=== Historical references ===
The title of the book suggests either a polemical challenge or a further development of technique and insight in relation to Nietzsche's debut Birth of Tragedy. The Ursprung, as it turns out, offers both a challenge and a development of several of that earlier work's themes having to do with theater as a vestigial (or otherwise, further evolved) aftermath and transformed remainder of cultic rites.

In the Birth of Tragedy, the ritual performance of the drama both unites the polity in a shared civic order, and enacts the breakdown or failure of that order in intoxication, madness, murder, suicide, familial violence and the general chaos of war according to the exorcismic principle of catharsis etc. This riffs on Aristotle's dramatic theory but Nietzsche's intent is to destroy the rationalizing Aristotelian orthodoxy in a breakthrough to the origin, facilitating a return to the embrace of more primal and violently realized forms of ritualism.

Nietzsche's book on the subject was completed after he returned from the Siege of Metz where the German army commanded by Moltke the Elder made its breakthrough in 1871 (only a few months into Franco-Prussian War), after which the French Army was rapidly dismantled and the encirclement of Paris quickly brought France to its knees. This was in the spring of the same year that Germany became a modern nation state in and by means of the process of this invasion, which unified splintered elements and remainders of the Holy Roman Empire in the territory which today is called Germany. The Birth of Tragedy was partly intended as promotional material for the Richard Wagner's Bayreuth Festival.

Nietzsche was not a normative public relations person, although Wagner was an important patron and father figure to him at the time that he wrote the Birth of Tragedy. The work's intended audience was not so much the standard Opera-going public of the day (although he may have assumed they would be interested). Instead it speaks toward the surging eternity of return composed of future generations who would rise up in the now-dawning (re: in the 1870s) advent of nihilism to slake themselves in a pseudo-Darwinian struggle of bloody self-assertion, as Nietzsche was later interpreted (quite plausibly) to have expressed in his Nachlass in his late reflections on this early work Several of Nietzsche's other early works expand or supplement his theses in the first book.

Knowledge of this description of tragedy as a sublimated form of ritual sacrifice in Nietzsche is generally assumed by Benjamin, rather than explicitly cited in each case of glancing reference to the earlier hybrid of Nietzsche's dramaturgy and theurgy in the revision proposed by the Ursprung.

Some basic familiarity with the history of Germany's foundation and the subsequent period leading up to and including the First World War, not to mention the Thirty Years' War, will tend to make reading the Ursprung a more rewarding and less arduous undertaking since Benjamin assumes that his readers will possess basic historical knowledge of these events.

=== The Cambridge Ritualists ===
As Benjamin embarked upon his work, the Cambridge Ritualists (a movement that also arose in response to the Birth of Tragedy) were enjoying the pinnacle of their influence in Britain. The scholarship of these Ritualists informed and substantively inspired several now-classic works of literary modernism (by T.S. Eliot, Virginia Woolf, H.D. and James Joyce) who were either being celebrated as a new visionary art-form or otherwise anathematized as forms of sacrilege and tried in court as obscenities. We have no evidence that Benjamin was aware of the Cambridge Ritualists, but a comparison of their scholarly project to Benjamin's experiment in the Ursprung may be the most efficient possible description of the thrust of his argument about the Trauerspiel (the German form of tragedy that arose during the Baroque period in the midst of the Thirty Years' War and its aftermath).

Briefly: The Cambridge Ritualists devoted themselves to reverse engineering the ritual forms and rites of the ancient Greeks, returning to the primal origin of the art in the eldritch ceremonies that preceded it by working backwards from the plays as they analyzed older archaeological evidence and inventoried or authenticated Ancient Greek art as experts, dating the work as they went along. The Ritualists also considered that Greek tragedy was a precursor to the modes of thought observed in Greek philosophy, and concerned themselves with illustrating this notion. They preferred tragedy to philosophy: they always preferred the original form to its successor.

Benjamin's Ursprung moves in a diametrically opposite direction, contra the Cambridge Ritualists.

He explored the fixations of Baroque drama (e.g. the Dark Sovereign who reinstates the order of nature by assuming dictatorial control of the state, dissolving parliament and inaugurating an orgy of slaughter, etc.) in the Trauerspiel as a precursor or primordial form of German political institutions and conventions, as well as a primeval dream-state or archaic remainder of juvenilia against whose chaos and morbid incoherence German idealism was derived as a psychic, stabilizing defense.

Benjamin was looking for the way that these plays dissolve into later political instincts and legal institutions, not attempting to enter their origin. The origin destroys itself in the process of creation, he tells us. He assumed the origin of the Trauerspiel to be—effectively—the sustained anarchy of intractable and apparently permanent violence in the Thirty Years' War. The origin is inarticulate and inexpressible as Benjamin understood it. Drama itself is the attempt at articulation (or an important aspect of that articulation), and the political history of Germany is partly composed by the expressed application of these early attempts to describe and accomplish collective character formation in the midst of the origin's brutality.

American, British and French readers will be able to appreciate that the Thirty Years' War has a status in German history similar to monumentalizing tendencies directed at the American Revolution, the English Civil War (and the Restoration of the British crown), or the French Revolution but with an important difference. Namely: the Thirty Years' War was a continental war or (in medieval terms) almost a world war that took place in the Holy Roman Empire (i.e. the imperial precursor to the mapping of later nation states that included Germany, Austria, Bohemia and parts of various other now distinct European nations etc.). It was much more das Ende (‘the End’) of something than a moment of genesis. Further, those familiar with Greek history will be in a position to appreciate that the War between the Persians and the Greeks (which the histories of Herodotus mark as the beginning of history), likewise, constituted the Attic polity out of which (in the annual festival of the Theater Dionysia in Athens) Greek tragedy first arose.

The Greco-Persian wars ended well for Athens; the Thirty Years War, for the Holy Roman Empire—not so much. Thus the distinction between tragedy and trauerspiel as Benjamin describes the ritualism of these forms.

=== Structure of argument ===
The above-remarks in the section on historical subtexts and assumed reference, sketch a long arc of Benjamin's argument regarding the Trauerspiel. He presents the Trauerspiel as distinct genre from tragedy, in part because its action does not derive from or refer to the gods. Trauerspiel represent a godless universe. In the world of the Trauerspiel, gods have been replaced by political forms, and the action of the gods have been replaced by the necessity of political intrigue for advancement in the power structure.

However much this argument may render the Ursprung legible, it is not representative of what is contained by the book itself. Proving his point about Trauerspiel (which he does manage to do, here and there) may be important to the work and if Benjamin had focused on the clarification, elaboration and conclusion of this argument perhaps his odds of receiving a habilitation may have improved.

But the Ursprung has no cleanly linear structure in this sense—to describe it as a progressive argument resolving into a discrete synthesis or conclusion at all would be misleading. The completed work is the death mask of its intention, according to Benjamin. Its progression is manifold and without absolute center, in the same way that the vacuum of authority and not the dictator is the real organizing force and overarcing conceit in Trauerspiel as Benjamin reads the genre.

The dictator does not succeed in reestablishing control. He tries and fails—his failure is what is mourned (a literal translation of Trauerspiel would be ‘mourning play’ not tragedy). The name of the genre implies the disaster has already happened before the action or the play itself even commences. The disaster is preordained. Its consequences still loom, even after the terminus of the action. The climax happens somewhere offstage: Likewise Benjamin's treatment. If the dictator fails by design, neither does Benjamin succeed in sticking to the development of any central argument in his treatment of that genre so especially concerned with the abortive apotheosis of the Dictator.

The Ursprung detours into metaphysics, careening into elaborate discussion of special typefaces or fonts while elaborating on their phenomenological effects. He sideswipes into speculations about the theory of categories and the relation of this area in medieval monastic theology to divine structures hidden in our time perception since the dawn of humanity. He introduces demonologies of the concept as a theological entity in exponentially involuting footnotes whose demotion to the margins he neglects to perform. He speaks of allegories as mechanisms of profane revelation and infernally doomed attempts to achieve an impossible stasis of meaning, undertaken out of a deeply sadomasochistic instinct. The book is littered with impulsive sidelines on sigils, hieroglyphics, involved meditations on the graphic prints of Albrecht Dürer, inventories of heraldic insignia, emblem books, contemplative cascades on the gnostic qualities of evil, revisions in periodic definition and dating of the end of the Dark Ages, frank appraisals of the necrophiliac tendencies of German chauvinism and patriotism, etc.

=== Resemblance to experimental art forms ===
His submission of this text, considered in retrospect, expects the same sort of allowances given to literary modernists or Dadaists by their audiences to be granted to him by his readers. In reality, Benjamin overestimated his committee's range and subtlety of thought or underestimated the overload inherent in the process actually trying to understand his prose in this particular text. It is without question the most difficult piece of prose that he produced in a long career of transforming invisible into the visceral, and attempting to work the arcane up into the palatable.

=== Resemblance to Nietzsche's reception ===
The Birth of Tragedy was Nietzsche's first book-length contribution, and the Ursprung seems to have been intended to operate in the same way for Benjamin. This resemblance (upon careful reading undertaken with the—perhaps prematurely expected—assumption of Benjamin's dignity as a major thinker on the part of the reader) is enhanced in the process of reading the work to the point where the Ursprung suggests itself as a ritual offering made at the beginning of a German philosopher's (or philologist's) career.

Incidentally the Birth of Tragedy itself was also not at all well received by the German academy, and led to a lasting demotion of his reputation amongst his colleagues in philology departments across Europe when his academics colleagues in the field expressed their disappointment in savagely contemptuous and belittling reviews. Thereafter the Doktors of Philology who had but recently proclaimed Nietzsche a rising star, displayed a marked reluctance to follow or attend to his progress as he continued in his still-early career, leading to his professional isolation in the university system in all German-speaking nations. This dimension of the work, Benjamin seems unlikely to have considered with a view to his own academic success when embarking on the Ursprung.

Benjamin assumed that the exceedingly subtle likenesses and gestures rendered in verbal texture—as with the eccentric inclination of his title—would be self-evident and well-understood by his readers, perhaps especially by the committee examining his postdoctoral thesis. Here he seems to have assumed much too much for the most part.

If anyone ever understood these dimensions of Benjamin's reference, it was likely Adorno who later taught several seminars on the text. Unfortunately Adorno's course materials, for the most part, do not survive.

These tendencies of thought and style mark Benjamin's Ursprung as an exquisitely or otherwise intolerably esoteric work. What is hidden in the text is often just as important as what is explicitly said in the body of its argument.

== Problem & summary ==
=== Esoteric context ===
The problem of a tendency in democracies to self-annihilate their own enfranchisement and constitutional principles of legal equality by electing dictators in times of anomie and cultural uncertainty looms in the background of Benjamin's considerations in the Ursprung from before the major period of his intensive literature review of Baroque drama in 1923 until long after the book's tardy publication in 1928.

Benjamin is ultimately agnostic on the question of democracy, displaying a mostly unstated and (one might almost say) a collegial or even ‘historically Jewish’ (according to the Nazi-jurist and legal theorist Carl Schmitt, towards whom the book was directed as a counter-hex) theological inclination toward democratic discernment. Regardless, Benjamin strongly leaned towards socialism and even communism from a date that falls in the middle of his composition of the Ursprung, when he met Asja Lācis in Capri.

Discussions which begin in the book are still being hashed out and troubled over in Adorno's secret seminar in 1933 when Hitler comes to power. This theme is as present (and only slightly less elusive or occluded) in Benjamin's Theses on the Philosophy of History, written in his final hours, as it is in the Ursprung. Given that the Frankfurt School and ultimately the New School grows up from Adorno's circle of students and colleagues, and that their heirs in academic lineage have continued working on this problem into the present, one might say the problem becomes foundational to an institution whose continuing research focuses on trying to understand why democratic subjects tend to choose fascism over rationalizing solutions such as social democracy, and (as we find occasionally discussed in the literature) what to do about it.

There is an indication in a letter that Benjamin sent as early as March 1923, that the Ursprung represents a second salvo continuing Benjamin's esoteric dialogue with the work of Carl Schmitt on the subject of the state of exception: the tragic flaw in the structure of democracy described above. Benjamin first addressed this issue in his Critique of Violence, which examines—among other things—the paradox of living in Social Democracy where the constitution is suspended and martial law is declared so frequently that it constitutes an increasingly normative aspect of the functioning of the state.

Carl Schmitt wrote his Political Theology, in part, as a response to the provocation of this essay and the questions it raised. Schmitt is cited in the text of the Ursprung, and producing an answer to his challenge seems to have preoccupied Benjamin in the construction of the major sections of the book.

Benjamin sent the Ursprung to Carl Schmitt as we know from his correspondence. Schmitt responded (insofar as he responded) to this second gauntlet thrown down by Benjamin several years later by legally formalizing the Gleichschaltung, an institutional drive towards the Nazification of all German institutions and social forms (including family, church and schools in addition to every other institutional form like commerce etc.).

=== Post-metaphysical foreword ===
As with the subtly feinted diagonal to Nietzsche's Birth of Tragedy in the title of the whole book (as above in the #Style & scope section), Benjamin's Epistemo-Critical Prologue, likewise contains a lyrical or sonic reference to Lenin's book on theoretical methodology under the heading Materialism and Empirio-criticism.

=== Kracauer's summary of the Prologue ===
Kracauer gives the most concise summary of the prologue, which appears in a book review of the Ursprung shortly after it came out in print:

The difference between traditional abstract thinking and Benjamin's manner of thinking is as follows: whereas the former drains the artifacts of their concrete plenitude, the latter burrows into the material thicket in order to unfold the dynamism at their core. [This method] accepts no generalities whatsoever, pursuing instead the unfolding manifestation of ideas in specific and really or presently perceived situations throughout history [where they ceaselessly evolve and never stabilize]. But since, for Benjamin, every idea is a monad, the whole world seems to him to proffer itself in [the holographic microcosm of] every presentation of such an idea. ‘The being that enters into it—the ideal with its previous and subsequent history—brings an abbreviated and darkened diagram of the rest of the world of ideas riding upon the artifact and concealed in its own figure,’ as Benjamin explains.

Siegfried Kracauer was a dear friend and colleague (frequently also Benjamin's editor at the Frankfurter Zeitung) and thus had the advantage of being able to directly ask the author what he was trying to do in the book, possibly returning to the question on several occasions before doing his write-up.

This may go some way towards explaining the degree by which Kracauer's grasp of the material exceeded the depth of understanding that a panel of PhDs working in the terrain of Benjamin's chosen subject were able to muster in the process of the Ursprung's review, despite the fact that they belonged to what was—at the time—the most advanced and sophisticated university system in the world at its peak: this, notwithstanding the fact that at least |one of the faculty members called up for the review, Max Horkheimer, is still considered to be amongst the most important thinkers of that period.

=== Early promotion ===
Siegfried Kracauer's later protégé Theodor Adorno at the Frankfurter Zeitung's art-desk went on to become the Ursprung's greatest disciple, teaching the book as a seminar course at Frankfurt University on several occasions.

Benjamin is attempting a reconciliation of different hermeneutic strategies --‘Hegelian synthesis’, ‘German Idealism’ in relation to the World Spirit or zeitgeist, Molitor's conceptions of the linguistic mysticism in the Kabbalah, and the Marxist style dialectical materialism-- in the space of a single monograph.

Given that readers familiar with even one of these discourses are likely to be unfamiliar with the other three strains of methodology actively transforming themselves as they intersect in the Ursprung, it is readily understandable that almost no one knew what to make of the book over the half-century prior to its rediscovery. This came in the wake of Benjamin's sudden rise to global fame in certain academic and artistic circles in the late 1960s. Especially called to Benjamin were all-stars of the counter-culture who had academic chops but worked independently in the new journalism outside of the academy. For example: Susan Sontag, John Berger, Marshall McLuhan etc. For the most part these three (who were major voices in the zeitgeist) owe the concepts and theories that made them famous to Benjamin.

In order to explain Benjamin's appeal to this later generation, one of his final articles for the Frankfurter Zeitung was a meditation on the mystical dimensions that opened to him on a visit to Marseilles. When he performed one of his several experiments in smoking, a high dose of hashish to observe the way in which it would alter his perceptions. Benjamin was early on the train of cannabinoids, mescaline and more generally “winning youth to the revolution by chemical sacraments” as he was on a great many other trends in thought and experimentation that would find massively scaled popular traction, only later on in the century.

=== Epistemo-Critical Prologue vs Materialism and Empirio-criticism vs Being and Time ===
Lenin's book on methodology, Materialism and Empirio-criticism, recommends rationalist pragmatism, subordinate to Marxist revolutionary theory, in the reading of history and world events.

Benjamin's Epistemo-Critical Prologue moves in the opposite direction: contemplating the limitations of scientific representation, and its contingency in relation to metaphysically ethereal yet, nevertheless, determining forces.

The terrain of awareness Benjamin tears open here anticipates Gödel's incompleteness theorems, the uncertainty principle and challenges proposed to our theory of knowledge presented in the Theory of relativity. Benjamin's thoughts on these subjects anticipate Werner Heisenberg and Kurt Gödel.

But he resorts to Goethe rather than calculus. Benjamin's critique of the hard sciences is couched in the jargon of aesthetics and metaphysics. Rather than presenting itself as a mathematical or logical proof, it suggests itself here as a sensibility.

The main drive is that absolute statement is impossible in human language or any other system of human representation including the numerical. Thus by extrapolation, he suggests in the first few pages that science is devoted to an impossible object or objective if it commits itself to the discovery of a unified field theory of static principles, given that the wild transformation of words and ideas over time will ravage these notions as the years go by; furthermore, their eternal and temporally essential transformation in real time makes it impossible to establish such principles in the first place.

From there the argument scales, iterates, qualifies and quickly recapitulates the development and relations of these dynamics throughout the history of western philosophy with particular emphasis on how they express themselves in the final, blood-drenched climax of the Reformation, specially referred to as the Baroque, for the next forty pages or so.

In terms of its epistemological and metaphysical claim (and not the specific historical substance his method addresses itself to), Benjamin's prologue later finds provisionally inferred support in Albert Einstein's introduction to Bertrand Russell's book on Theory of Knowledge which awkwardly and agreeably logs an objection to the main arguments of the book that this essay by Einstein introduces. It is very unlikely that Einstein read Benjamin in order to inform his judgment on this question. Russell is a positivist. Benjamin and Einstein are not positivists, in terms of their theory of knowledge. Benjamin occasionally toys with the term nihilism, but this word has many connotations that do not apply to him especially in his own time.

The introduction to the Origins of German Tragedy—the "Epistemo-Critical Foreword"—is so difficult as a philosophical and theological exercise and, retrospectively, so substantively important in the discourse of metaphysics and fundamental ontology in German and European thought (especially in the aftermath of Friedrich Nietzsche) that in many respects the Ursprung's foreword dwarfs the main body of the book that follows it.

The work attempts to constitute an alternative (or at least a skeptical refusal) to the embrace of the will to power and a warning against this trend.

It is conjectured that the foreword to this book so disarmed and confused his committee at the academy that it disqualified the substance of the book from fair consideration.

In several of its conceptions it resembles, precedes and takes exception to the same terrain of fundamental ontology later explicated (without attribution or immediate awareness of the relation on the part of the later author) in Martin Heidegger's Being and Time. Except in Benjamin's case these arguments are advanced as a provisional preparatory note to a marginal study of dramaturgy informing the memory of an extinct, archaic and little read genre of late-medieval, post-apocalyptic plays.

Putatively written to outline Benjamin's methodology for the study of Baroque tragedy, the foreword may be read as no less than a manifesto of a new mysticism of word and concept proposed in the void of religious feeling following upon the loss of the Bible's status as a transcendental authority in the late 19th century sometimes referred to as the Death of God.

This is a terminology that Benjamin and Scholem rigorously avoid. On the contrary, they see something resembling (for them in the early phase of their careers and in a transformed sense later on) the basic insight of monotheism, encrypted in Biblical myth or otherwise revealed in the script (where “the medium is the message” as Marshall McLuhan later summarized Benjamin). It is not the original insight of monotheism that they see in what militant German nihilists refer to as the Death of God. These people, Benjamin and Scholem, are not originalists or fundamentalists. Benjamin, in the Unsprung chases after the revelation in jetzeit or in the now-time, which is the only place where insights have ever happened—at the foot of Mount Sinai in what are now ancient centuries that remain to us only in their artifacts, or in the present of the 1920s while he is working on the Ursprung or right now as we read it.

What the mysticism outlined in the Ursprung looks like in terms of its practice or application is never directly discussed, or systematically outlined. It is not even called a mysticism until much later. It is only suggested by the shape of the work and its method. Nevertheless, the grounding for its conception as an after-theology or post-theology is remarkably accomplished in the course of its presentation.

=== Exoteric content ===
Instead of focusing on the more famous examples of baroque drama from around the world, such as Pedro Calderón de la Barca and William Shakespeare, Benjamin chose to write about the minor German dramatists of the 16th and 17th century: Martin Opitz, Andreas Gryphius, Johann Christian Hallmann, Daniel Caspar von Lohenstein, and August Adolf von Haugwitz. For him, these playwrights – who were seen as too crude, dogmatic, and violent by earlier critics to be considered true artists – best reflected the unique cultural and historical climate of their time. Benjamin singles out the theme of "sovereign violence" as the most important unifying feature of the German "trauerspiel" or "mourning play". In their obsessive focus on courtly intrigue and princely bloodlust, these playwrights break with the mythic tradition of classical tragedy and create a new aesthetic based on the tense interplay between Christian eschatology and human history. Foreshadowing his later interest in the concept of history, Benjamin concludes that, in these plays, history "loses the eschatological certainty of its redemptive conclusion, and becomes secularized into a mere natural setting for the profane struggle over political power."

== Hermeneutic antidote to Nietzsche ==
=== In relation to the Third Reich ===
In 1930, after the first major coup at the polls by the Nazi party in an election, Thomas Mann gave an epoch-marking speech (published shortly thereafter in the Berliner Tageblatt) that strongly indicates Nietzsche's Birth of Tragedy as a philosophical and (anti-) theological foundation of Nazism, indicting Nietzsche's heirs, such as Carl Schmitt and Martin Heidegger by clear and unmistakable description of their work. He depicts their teachings as the intellectual ferment in which Hitler could gain power over the minds and collective will of the German masses in a situation of despair over the failure of long tradition to produce answers in the crisis following the First World War, marked by hyperinflation, and economic depression amidst other horrors of a more spiritual character which are harder to name. Yet, Mann is at pains in this speech to describe these and to denounce them.

Benjamin enters a vague pact with his lifelong correspondent, co-conspirator, and intelligence source in Israel, the Kabbalist Gershom Scholem very early in their friendship: They chose Heidegger—and thus, in the long-run, Nietzsche— as their nemesis as early as 1915. (Scholem expresses solidarity with Benjamin in this stance in 1917). Benjamin and Heidegger both attended the seminar on time's emptiness and fulfillment in Heinrich Rickert's class in the summer semester of 1913, which set them both on the paths of their research. Their careers and the particular questions or concerns they follow remain entangled by opposing descriptions and antithetical interpretations of the same terrain of metaphysics after its evacuation by transcendent authority ever after that intersection.

In his Ursprung, we find Benjamin present at the primal scene well ahead of Thomas Mann (re: Style & Scope). That Benjamin was called to address the Trauerspiel partly as a polemic response to Carl Schmitt's Nietzschean interpretation of German Baroque politics and drama (re: Problem & Summary) supports Thomas Mann's identification of Nietzsche as a symptomatic figure close to the root of the ideological crisis (Schmitt, as the Nazi party's lawyer throughout the 1920s, and as their anti-constitutional legal theorist at the outset of the Third Reich, is not a trivial figure but one of Hitler's most influential supporters, and the Nietzschean inspiration of Schmitt's nihilism is not ambiguous).

=== Antithesis to the 'will to power' ===
Benjamin speaks of intentionless states as essential to deep reading—his relationship to text and the hermeneutic approach he recommends in the Ursprung are adjacent to a ritual form of mindfulness.

Benjamin, contra Nietzschean affirmation, anticipates a negative dialectical approach to this whole terrain and in its precedent text, Towards the Critique of Violence. He maintains dread, tension and resistance to the desire for a Dictator, underlining the folly and atrocities that follow the affirmation of the will to violence and illuminates the inherent tragedy of the will to power. He offers an antidote to the will to power: careful reading without compulsion, or necessary incentive. He will have ample opportunity to read without incentive after his thesis is rejected. We find the prescription more incisively laid out at the climax of his Critique of Violence than in the Ursprung where it is modeled at macrocosmic scale rather than being proved or boiled down to a bullet-point. It echoes allusively and persistently in the larger work that followed his first proposal without resorting to formulaic summary. The concept is modeled and implied cyclically and suggestively in the mysticism of ‘the concept-as-demon’ presented in the Ursprung's foreword and is demonstrated throughout the text that follows. The will to read freely counters the will to power, in Benjamin's Ursprung.

However utopian and even impotent this tactic may seem in comparison to Nietzsche's (it is literally anti-potent or against the violence of militant power as such) it may be well to recall that Hitler's thousand year Reich lasted for only twelve years and that the year 1963 celebrated the publication of the book-length anthology of Eichmann in Jerusalem (a reading of Adolf Eichmann's trial by Benjamin's student, colleague and literary co-executrix, Hannah Arendt written as a series court-side at the trial in 1961) in a period of steadily expanding liberal democracy—not the thirtieth anniversary of Hitler's ascent to dictatorship in Germany, in a world prostrate beneath the swastika after the (counter-historical, null) victory of Nazism.

The history of 20th century in relation to the Third Reich and its aftermath unfolded as Benjamin foresaw in a cryptic fragment of his paralipomena, bridging the gap in his commentary between his Critique of Violence and the Ursprung, composing an afterword and preparatory note that connects to both:

In the revelation of the divine, the world-the theater of history—is subjected to a great process of decomposition, while time—the life of him who represents it—is subjected to a great process of fulfillment... In this world, divine power is higher than divine powerlessness; in the world to come, divine powerlessness is higher than divine power.

== See also ==
- Benjamin's theory of justice
- Marxist hermeneutics
