= Joshua Trachtenberg =

Rabbi Joshua Trachtenberg
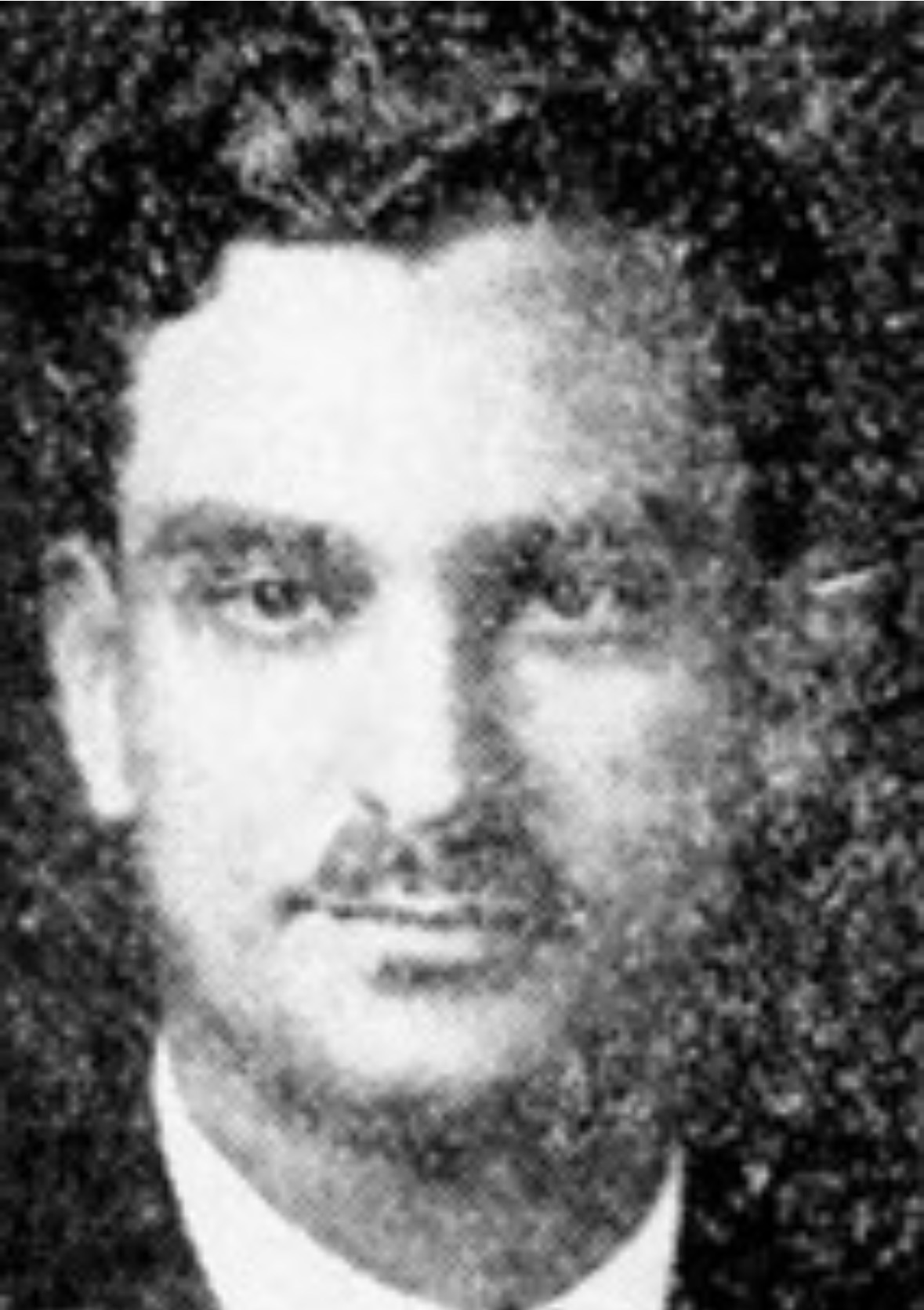
- Rabbi Joshua Trachtenberg. c. 1935

Personal life
- Born: 1904 London, England
- Died: 1959 (aged 54–55) Teaneck, New Jersey

Religious life
- Religion: Judaism

Joshua Trachtenberg (1904–1959) was a reform Rabbi based in the United States of America. The much beloved Rabbi of a Jewish congregation in New Jersey during his life, Trachtenberg is best-remembered in the 20th and 21st centuries for his books Jewish Magic and Superstition (1939) and The Devil and the Jews (1943), written during the Third Reich and published during World War II.

Both works deal with Kabbalah, Jewish folk religion, and also with recurrent gentile superstitions about the nature of Jewish religious practice that inspired or were exploited to justify pogroms over many centuries up into the present circumstances from which Trachtenberg wrote.

These works have been published in many editions and remain in print in 2026.

Trachtenberg is cited favorably in Major Trends in Jewish Mysticism by Gershom Scholem, published in its first edition after Trachtenberg’s book on Jewish magic, but shortly before The Devil and the Jew. Though less famous than Major Trends, Trachtenberg’s best known books may be considered early entries in a wave of scholarship on the literature of Kabbalah conducted outside of both insular Rabbinic contexts and popular literature of occultism in which it had mostly been confined until the Second World War.

== Biography ==
Trachtenberg was born in London but travelled to America at aged three. He received his rabbinical ordination at Hebrew Union College (1936), and went on to serve at multiple congregations. He worked in many areas of Jewish scholarship including a survey of religious conditions in Israel (1951–52), which was sponsored by the Central Conference of American Rabbis and the Union of American Hebrew Congregations.

Trachtenberg was also active in the field of community work. In Easton he was the president of the Jewish Community Council (1939–46), and as an ardent Zionist; politically, a Social Democrat (the kibbutzim represented his ideal), and he was identified with the Labour Zionist movement.

His most notable work Jewish Magic and Superstition (1939, repr. 1961 and again 2004 with a foreword by Moshe Idel) was his Ph.D. dissertation at Columbia University. From this came another notable work The Devil and the Jews (1943, repr. 1966), which examines the relationship of the medieval conception of antisemitism to the modern variety. As virtuoso meditations on mystical practice and esoteric history, these works stand in contrast with his other books such as the survey of Israel in its first decade or Consider the Years (1944), a history of the Easton Jewish community where he presided.
