= Popular belief =

Popular beliefs are studied as a sub-field of social sciences, like history and anthropology, which examines spiritual beliefs that develop not independently from religion, but still outside of established religious institutions. Aspects of popular piety, historical folklore, and historical superstitions are some of the themes explored.

Social scientists who study popular belief offer explanations for behaviors and events that arose as a means of redress in times of adversity or from perceived practical or spiritual utility. The cause of the European witch craze, responsible for the death of many older women in the sixteenth and seventeenth century, is one such area of research. The attitudes to sanctity and relics in the central Middle Ages, which represent a bottom-up phenomenon (whereby relics became acceptable to the Roman Catholic Church as a result of their popularity among the masses), is another widely studied area of popular belief.

== History ==
=== European Middle Ages ===
The population of pre-modern, Western Europe was exceedingly liable to pain, sickness, and premature death. Epidemics such as the bubonic plague and famine plowed through European towns during the late Middle Ages, at times cutting the population by half. People often turned to saints and their relics, as well as magic, making a charm from the Eucharist wafer for example, for relief of both great and small problems.

=== Early Modern Europe ===
Astrology, witchcraft, magical healing, divination, ancient prophecies, ghosts, and fairies were taken very seriously by people at all social and economic levels in the sixteenth and seventeenth centuries. Helplessness in the face of disease and human disaster helped to perpetuate this belief in magic and the supernatural. The early effects of the Little Ice Age kept the food supply at precarious levels. Social unrest and witch hunts abounded. Some forms of magic were challenged by the Protestant Reformation.

=== Modern Europe ===
Only with the increased search for scientific explanation of the universe did Western Europeans begin to abandon their recourse to the supernatural. Science and technology have made us less vulnerable to some of the hazards which confronted the people of the past.

Yet in many parts of the contemporary world, spirit beliefs and practices have continue to serve a pivotal role in addressing the discontinuities and uncertainties of modern life. The myriad ways in which devotees engage the spirit world shows the tremendous creative potential of these practices and their innate adaptability to changing times and circumstances.

=== Modern Asia ===
Anthropological case studies from Indonesia, Malaysia, Thailand, Myanmar, Laos, and Vietnam investigate the role and impact of different social, political, and economic dynamics in the reconfiguration of local spirit worlds in modern Southeast Asia. Their findings contribute to the re-enchantment debate by revealing that the “spirited modernities” that have emerged in the process not only embody a distinct feature of the contemporary moment, but also invite a critical rethinking of the concept of modernity itself.

== Popular piety ==
Also known as folk religion, popular piety (or popular religion, personal piety) refers to religious practices that arose and occur outside of official religious institutions. Typically the term is used within the context of the Catholic church in Western Europe, and the practices are generally allowed, if not accepted. Forms of popular piety can be seen from the earliest Christian communities through the Middle Ages and into the present day.

Folk religions take two forms in Asia: as distinct religions (East Asia) and as popularized versions of world religions (South and Southeast Asia). Chinese Folk Religion, in its present form dating back to the Song dynasty (960–1279), includes elements traceable to prehistoric times (ancestor worship, shamanism, divination, a belief in ghosts, and sacrificial rituals to the spirits of sacred objects and places, like relics in the West) as well as aspects of Buddhism, Confucianism, and Taoism. Buddhist elements include believing in karma and rebirth, accepting Buddha and other bodhisattvas as gods, and using Buddhist meditational techniques. The Confucian influence is the concept of filial piety and associated practices. The numerous gods are organized into a hierarchy headed by the Jade Emperor, a deity borrowed from Taoism. Important annual rituals reflect their origin in an agrarian way of life (e.g., a harvesttime festival), but have been given new or additional meaning to accord with the ancestral cult or Buddhism. The religion is not centrally organized and lacks a formal canon. Rituals take place before home altars or at temples, which have no fixed congregations. Adherents vary considerably in belief and practice. Generally, folk religionists are fatalistic yet believe that one's luck can be affected by pleasing ancestors or gods, by locating graves and buildings in places where vital natural forces are located (geomancy), and by balancing opposing forces (yin, yang) within one's body.

In Korea, Buddhism, Confucianism, and Taoism have influenced the elite, while a folk religion has existed among the common people that resembles Chinese Folk Religion. However, unlike the Chinese case, most Korean spirit mediums are women, a vestige from a time when female deities dominated the folk religion. The Japanese have been influenced by Shinto, Buddhism, and Confucianism. Buddhism and Shinto have separate organizations, buildings, festivals, and religious specialists. Thus one can speak of Japanese religions that individuals blend in different ways but not of a distinct Japanese folk religion.

Indonesia is an example of Asian countries where syncretic religions have been dominant. On Java, nearly everyone identifies with Islam, but most people practice Agama Jawa, Javanese religion, or Javanese Islam. This form of religion is a mixture of animistic, Islamic, and to a lesser extent Hindu elements (at one time, Java was under the control of local Hindu rulers). Those who practice Javanese religion call themselves Muslims. In addition, Javanese religionists employ animistic rituals, such as ceremonial meals commemorating a person's transition to a new stage in the life cycle or important moments in the life of the village (slametan, the rituals of which reflect animistic beliefs), consult dukun (magicians capable of controlling the impersonal force that exists in all things), and use their own numerology to ensure that actions are synchronized with natural processes. The counterpart to Javanese Islam in southern Asia is "popular Islam". In a somewhat similar manner, one can speak of Burmese, Sri Lankan, and Thai Buddhism.

== See also ==
- Folk belief – Type of belief system
- Folk Catholicism – Variety of regional or ethnic expressions of Catholicism
- Folk Christianity – Expressions of religion distinct from the doctrines of organized religion
- Folk religion – Expressions of religion distinct from the doctrines of organized religion
- Folklore – Expressive culture shared by particular groups
- New religious movement – Religious community or spiritual group of modern origin
- Popular piety – Expressions of folk Catholicism
- Pseudoreligion – Non-mainstream philosophical movement which functions like a religion
- Religion – Social-cultural system
- Superstition – Belief or behavior that is considered irrational or supernatural
