= Theses on the Philosophy of History =

1940 essay by German philosopher and critic Walter Benjamin

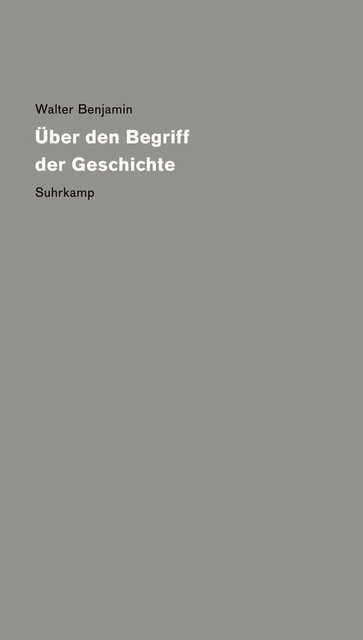
Über den Begriff der Geschichte (2010 edition, Suhrkamp)

"Theses on the Philosophy of History" or "On the Concept of History" (German: Über den Begriff der Geschichte) is an essay written in early 1940 by German Jewish philosopher and critic Walter Benjamin. It is one of Benjamin's best-known and most controversial works.

Composed of twenty numbered paragraphs, the brief essay was written by Benjamin shortly before he attempted to escape from Vichy France, where French collaborationist government officials were handing over Jewish refugees like Benjamin to the Nazi Gestapo. Theses is the last major work Benjamin completed before fleeing to Spain, where he died on 26 September 1940.

== Summary ==
In the essay, Benjamin uses poetic and scientific analogies to present a critique of historicism.

One interpretation of Benjamin in Thesis I is that Benjamin is suggesting that despite claims to scientific objectivity, the historical materialism of vulgar Marxists is actually a quasi-religious fraud or, conversely, that theology is an essential and ultimately unavoidable backdrop to philosophical, scientific and economic discourse. Benjamin uses the Mechanical Turk, a famous chess-playing device of the 18th century, as an analogy for historical materialism. Presented as an automaton that could defeat skilled chess players, The Turk actually concealed a human who controlled the machine. He wrote:

One can envision a corresponding object to [The Turk] in philosophy. The puppet called 'historical materialism' is always supposed to win. It can do this with no further ado against any opponent, so long as it employs the services of theology, which as everyone knows is small and ugly and must be kept out of sight.

Importantly, the Marxist author Michael Löwy points out that Benjamin puts quotation marks around 'historical materialism' in this paragraph:

The use of quotation marks and the way this is phrased suggest that this automaton is not "true" historical materialism, but something that is given that name. By whom, we ask. And the answer must be the chief spokesmen of Marxism in his period, that is to say the ideologues of the Second and Third Internationals.

One key to Benjamin's critique of historicism is his rejection of the past as a continuum of progress. This is most apparent in Thesis XIII:

The conception of the progress of mankind in history is inseparable from that of the process of history as passing through a homogeneous and empty time. The critique of the idea of this process must form the basis of the critique of the idea of progress as such.

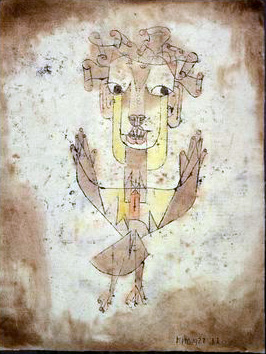
Klee's Angelus Novus

His alternate vision is best represented by Thesis IX, which employs Paul Klee's monoprint Angelus Novus (1920) as the "angel of history", with his back turned to the future: "Where we see the appearance of a chain of events, he sees one single catastrophe, which unceasingly piles rubble on top of rubble and hurls it before his feet .... That which we call progress, is this storm." Benjamin thus inverts Marxist historical materialism, which was concerned with predicting a revolutionary future, to assert that historical materialism's true task ought to be, in the words of political scientist Ronald Beiner, "to save the past".

According to Benjamin, "Historicism depicts the 'eternal' picture of the past; the historical materialist, an experience with it, which stands alone" (Thesis XVI). Benjamin argues against the idea of an "eternal picture" of history and prefers the idea of history as a self-standing experience. He writes:

To articulate the past historically does not mean to recognize it 'the way it really was'. For historical materialism it means to seize hold of a memory as it flashes up at a moment of danger. The danger which threatens both the tradition and its recipients. The danger of allowing themselves to be the tools of the ruling class. The tradition must always be won anew from conformism. The Messiah will also come as the conqueror of the Antichrist, not only as a redeemer (Thesis VI).

Like Benjamin's colleague and friend Gershom Scholem, who had seen in Klee's painting the "baroque concept of history" as unstoppable decay, so too there is the kabbalistic concept of the tikkun, the messianic "restoration and mending" of all things in their original integrity, indicated in Thesis IX by the phrase: "awaken the dead, and make whole what has been smashed" (German: "die Toten wecken und das Zerschlagene zusammenfügen").

In Thesis XVIII, he highlights a scientific perspective of time:

'In relation to the history of organic life on Earth,' notes a recent biologist, 'the miserable fifty millennia of homo sapiens represents something like the last two seconds of a twenty-four hour day. The entire history of civilized humanity would, on this scale, take up only one fifth of the last second of the last hour.' The here-and-now, which as the model of messianic time summarizes the entire history of humanity into a monstrous abbreviation, coincides to a hair with the figure, which the history of humanity makes in the universe.

Scholem, who is quoted in Theses, believed that Benjamin's critique of historical materialism was so final that, "nothing remains of historical materialism ... but the term itself." Benjamin may have taken exception to this interpretation. From the first thesis of the work he establishes the revelation of dialectical materialism as a veiled form of theology and this is a major theme of the work. He critiques the rationalizing conceit of a deterministic and certainly promised victory of historical materialism in a call for a form of revolution that might prevail against fascism. This may be intended as revision rather than rejection of the tradition.

== Historical context ==
The essay marks a return from Benjamin’s more secular, aesthetic Marxist style to the theologically tonal, metaphysically scaled scope and power of his earlier works, remarks Scholem. This came amidst the deep shock Benjamin felt following news the Molotov–Ribbentrop Pact and, shortly thereafter, the beginning of the Second World War.

Many of the ideas and phrases composing critical passages of the theses appear half-formed in Benjamin's slightly earlier essay on the eccentric 19th century art collector, Eduard Fuchs.

The winter that he drafted his theses on the concept of history Benjamin read, in a pairing or book discussion group with Hannah Arendt and her lover Heinrich Blücher, an early draft of Scholem's Major Trends in Jewish Mysticism as the three of them hid at Benjamin's sister's house in Lourdes. This reading, and much of Benjamin's composition of the theses, come after Benjamin's imprisonment at an internment camp in Nevers in 1939, but before Arendt's imprisonment at the concentration camp in Gurs in the midst of the Battle of France as they are reading Scholem's introduction to the Kabbalah together in the winter of 1939-1940. The "philosophy of history", which is the guiding theme of these meditations, acts as a kind of code word for a certain terrain in Kabbalah—specifically where overlaps with, and undermines German Idealism. It is a kindred discipline to Kabbalah in their shared understanding. They had read Franz Molitor's Philosophy of History together in 1916, when Scholem was just embarking on his study of the Kabbalah, a canon of mystical literature that he reintroduces and to some extent resurrects in his Major Trends, published shortly after Benjamin's death. They had consulted together on this subject terrain for years: Scholem expertly as a librarian of ancient manuscripts; Benjamin somewhat more free-associatively. Major Trends was dedicated to Benjamin's memory, and was published as Operation Reinhard commenced.

== Publication history ==
Benjamin mailed a copy of the essay to Arendt, who passed it on to Theodor Adorno. Benjamin asked that the essay not be published, but it was first printed in a mimeographed booklet entitled Walter Benjamin zum Gedächtnis (In memory of Walter Benjamin) in the spring of 1942. The material in the coda of this ‘stapled-together affair’ by Adorno and Horkheimer constitute a precursor and thumbnail sketch of their own best known work in the Dialectic of the Enlightenment.

In 1947, a French translation ("Sur le concept d'histoire") by Pierre Missac appeared in the journal Les Temps Modernes no. 25. An English translation by Harry Zohn is included in the collection of essays by Benjamin, Illuminations, edited by Arendt (1968). Arendt read a draft of the work to fellow refugees fleeing the Third Reich in Europe on the ship organized by the Emergency Rescue Committee that smuggled her and other Jewish emigrés to the United States. Her 1957 essay "The Concept of History" was titled partly in homage to Benjamin, whose work was not yet well known.

Arendt later wrote several essays of her own giving expansive treatments to this territory, under headings that nod to Benjamin’s earlier work, including “The Concept of History” and “The Threat of Conformism.”
