= Folk belief =

Genre of folklore

In folkloristics, folk belief or folk-belief is a broad genre of folklore that is often expressed in narratives, customs, rituals, foodways, proverbs, and rhymes. It also includes a wide variety of behaviors that are influenced by folk belief through literature and theater. Examples of concepts included in this genre are magic, popular belief, folk religion, planting signs, hoodoo, conjuration, charms, rootwork, taboos, old wives' tales that inspire fear and awe among those that practice folk traditions. In addition, there are omens, portents, the supernatural and folk medicine.

Folk belief and associated behaviors are strongly evidenced among all elements of society, regardless of education level or income. Folk belief is found in an agricultural, suburban, and urban environments alike. Folk belief can appear in many different ways within a culture. Folk belief is a common practice across the globe, embodying culturally distinct features dependent upon geographic location.

== Terminology ==
One of a variety of compounds extending from the coinage of the term folklore in 1846 (previously popular antiquities), the term folk-belief is first evidenced in use by British folklorist Laurence Gomme in 1892.

Common parlance employs the word superstition for what folklorists generally refer to as folk belief.

== See also ==
- New religious movement – Religious community or spiritual group of modern origin
- Popular belief- Influenced by religion, but developed outside of established religious institutions
- Pseudoreligion – Non-mainstream philosophical movement which functions like a religion
- Religion – Social-cultural system
- Old wives' tales- Supposed truth that is actually a superstition
- Folk religion- Religious expression distinct from organized religious doctrines
