= John Bowker (theologian) =

English priest and scholar

John Westerdale Bowker (born 30 July 1935) is an English Anglican priest and pioneering scholar of religious studies. A former director of studies and dean of chapel at Corpus Christi and Trinity College, Cambridge he is credited with introducing religious studies as a discipline to Cambridge University. He has been a professor of religious studies at the universities of Cambridge, Lancaster, Pennsylvania and North Carolina State University. He is an Honorary Canon of Canterbury Cathedral, a consultant for UNESCO, a BBC broadcaster and author and editor of numerous books.

== Life ==
Bowker was educated at St John's School, Leatherhead, Worcester College, Oxford and Ripon Hall, Oxford. He undertook his national service with the RWAFF in northern Nigeria and then became the Henry Stevenson Fellow at the University of Sheffield in 1961. He then moved to the University of Cambridge where he was Dean of Chapel of Corpus Christi College, Cambridge (1962) and Assistant Lecturer (1965) and Lecturer (1970). In 1974 he was appointed Professor of Religious Studies at the University of Lancaster, and in 1984 moved back to Cambridge as Dean of Chapel of Trinity College, Cambridge (1984–91) and a Fellow of Trinity College, Cambridge (1984–93), also teaching, supervising and researching at the university. From 1992 to 1997 he was Gresham professor of Divinity at Gresham College, London.

He was appointed adjunct professor at the University of Pennsylvania and at North Carolina State University in 1986.

He gave many invited lectures including the Wilde (University of Oxford), Riddell Newcastle University, Boutwood University of Cambridge, Scott Holland University of London, Bicentenary Georgetown University.

He served on various commissions including the Archbishops' Commission on Doctrine (1977–86). He was appointed vice-president of the Institute on Religion in an Age of Science in 1980.

== Academic work ==
Bowker has written and edited many books on world religions. He has also taken a deep interest in science and religion and in particular the relationship of biology and psychology to religion.

In 1983 he edited Violence and Aggression and 1987 he wrote Licensed Insanities: religions and belief in God in the contemporary world

In 1992 and 1993 he gave lectures at Gresham College analysing in detail the claim by Richard Dawkins that belief in God was a kind of mental virus. In the scientific parts he collaborated with Quinton Deeley, a student of his whose dissertation on biogenetic structuralism led to his deciding to re-train as a doctor and is now a published psychiatrist. He suggests that this "account of religious motivation...is...far removed from evidence and data." and that, even if the God-meme approach were valid, "it does not give rise to one set of consequences... Out of the many behaviours it produces, why are we required to isolate only those that might be regarded as diseased? And who ... decides, and on what grounds, what is diseased? ... there is nothing here as objective as the observation of chicken-pox... the observer...is highly relative".

In his 2005 book The Sacred Neuron: The Extraordinary New Discoveries Linking Science and Religion he suggests that it is incorrect to view faith and reason as opposing functions. He argues that recent discoveries in the neurosciences are revealing startling facts about the workings of the human mind and how certain ideas are processed into beliefs. His publishers assert that "John Bowker shows that faith and belief are not separate or distinct from reason, but are actually rooted in it. And science—especially neurophysiology—is the key to unlocking how we think about God, about the relationship between different cultures and religions, and about the processes of the human mind that influence our behavior. When rationality and faith are viewed as complementary a new understanding of the human mind can serve as a basis for resolving conflicts between religions and cultures. This discovery has stunning implications for the world."

== Bibliography ==
- Religion Hurts: Why Religions do Harm as well as Good (2018) Society for Promoting Christian Knowledge, ISBN 9780281076901
- Why Religions Matter (2015) Cambridge University Press ISBN 978-1-107-44834-6 Paperback. ISBN 978-1-107-08511-4 Hardback
- God: A Very Short Introduction (2014) Oxford University Press, ISBN 9780191019135
- The Message and the Book: Sacred Texts of the World's Religions (2011) Atlantic Books ISBN 978-1-848-87811-2 Hardback
- An Alphabet of Animals (2010) Key Publishing Toronto
- Before the Ending of the Day: Life and Love, Death and Redemption (2010) Key Publishing Toronto ISBN 9780981160610
- Knowing the Unknowable: Science and Religions on God and the Universe (Editor, 2009) Tauris, London ISBN 9781845117573
- Conflict and Reconciliation: The Contribution of Religions (Editor, 2008) Key Publishing Toronto ISBN 9781688423862
- Beliefs That Changed the World (2007) ISBN 184724016X
- World Religions: The Great Faiths Explored and Explained (2006) Dorling Kindersley, ISBN 1-4053-1439-7
- The Sacred Neuron: The Extraordinary New Discoveries Linking Science and Religion (2005) Palgrave MacMillan ISBN 1-85043-481-6
- God: A Brief History (2004) Dorling Kindersley ISBN 1-4053-0490-1
- The Cambridge Illustrated History of Religion (2002—editor) ISBN 9780521810371
- The Complete Bible Handbook (1998) 2nd Ed (2004) ISBN 9780760778449
- The Oxford Dictionary of World Religions (1997) Oxford University Press ISBN 0-19-213965-7
- What Muslims Believe (1995) Oneworld Publications
- Is God a Virus?: Genes, Culture and Religion (1995) SPCK ISBN 0-281-04812-6
- Uncle Bolpenny Tries Things Out (1993) Faber & Faber ISBN 9780571099733
- The Meanings of Death (1991) Cambridge University Press (1993) Canto Edition
- A Year to Live: A Cycle of Meditations on the Transforming Power of the Christian Story (1991) SPCK, ISBN 9780281045587
- Licensed Insanities: Religions and belief in God in the contemporary world (1987) DLT ISBN 0-232-51725-8
- Cosmology, Religion and Society (1990) Zygon, 25 pp7-22
- Worlds of Faith: Religious belief and Practice in Britain today (1989) BBC ISBN 0-563-20197-5
- The Aeolian Harp: Sociobiology and Human Judgement (1980) Zygon, 15 pp307-33
- The Religious Imagination and the Sense of God (1978) Oxford University Press (1995) Oneworld Publications ISBN 1-85168-093-4
- The Sense of God: Sociological, anthropological and psychological approaches to the origin of the sense of God (1973) Oxford, Clarendon Press
- Jesus and the Pharisees (1973) Cambridge University Press
- 'Merkabah' Visions and the Visions of Paul (1970) Journal of Semitic Studies, 16 pp157-73
- Problems of Suffering in Religions of the World (1970) Cambridge University Press
- The Targums and Rabbinic Literature: An Introduction to Jewish Interpretations of Scripture (1969) Cambridge University Press
- Intercession in the Qur'an and the Jewish Tradition (1966) Journal of Semitic Studies, 11 pp69-82

== Sources ==
- Who's Who 2004
- Amazon.com
- Palgrave MacMillan website
- Oxford University Press website
- Cambridge University Press website
- Books cited
