= Spiritual warfare in China =

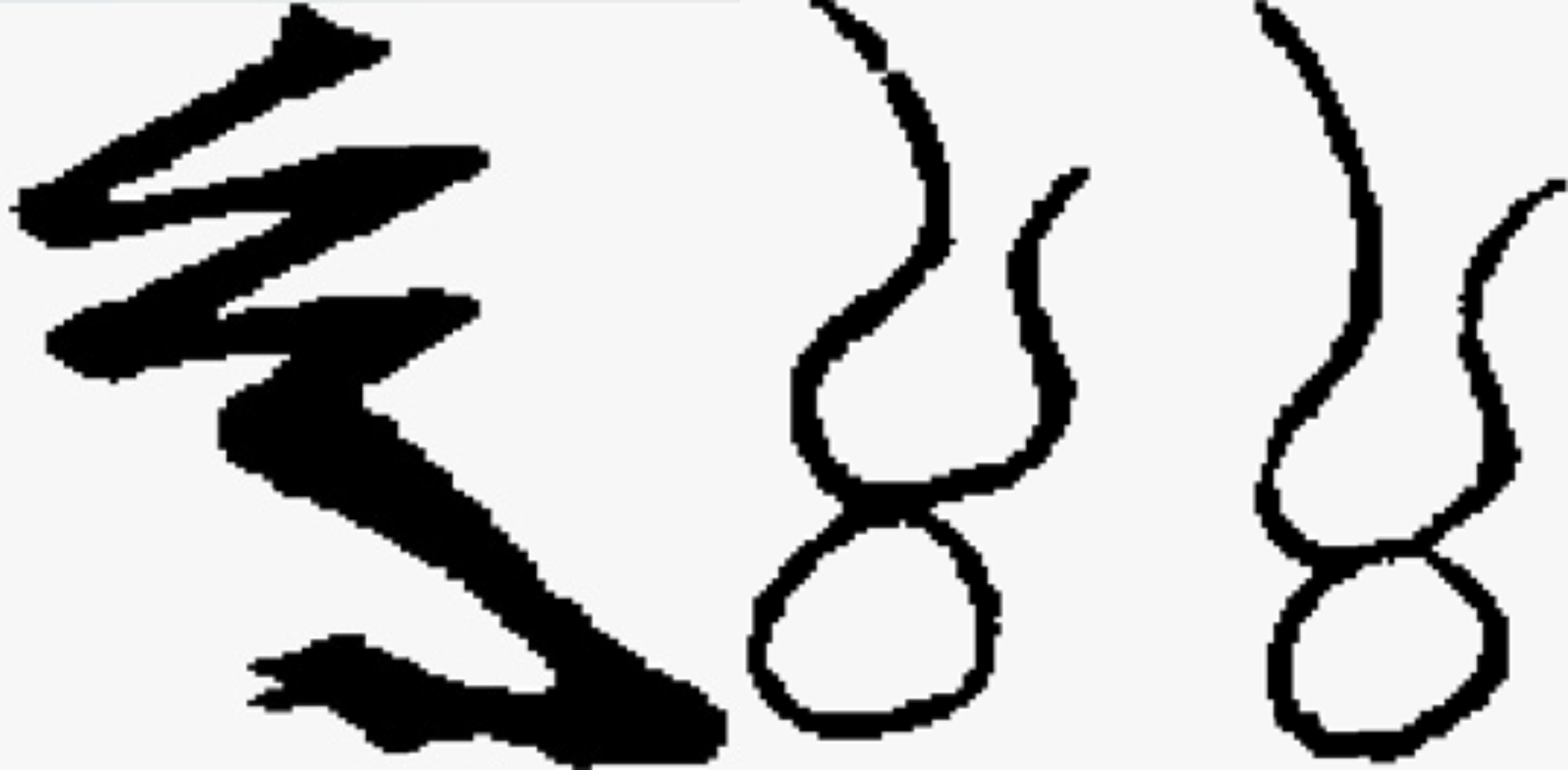
Symbols of supernatural power in Taoist talismans

Spiritual warfare in China is a concept in several cultural groups of China of using various methods and devices believed to ward off supernatural evil or interfering forces.

== Cultural practices ==
In the tradition of Chinese folk religion, demonic forces were believed to cause illness or misfortune and armies of divine soldiers (神兵 shenbing) and their divine generals (神将 shenjiang) could deter demonic attack or expel demons.

Infants and children were believed to be at particular risk of demonic attack, which as academic S.A. Smith writes may have been a way of rationalizing exceptionally high infant mortality prior to the founding of the People's Republic of China (PRC). Such supernatural fears regarding children and birth declined as infant mortality declined in the PRC during the Mao Zedong era.

One author writes of how the wood of the peach tree has been a key device in fighting evil spirits in China:

The Chinese also considered peach wood (t'ao-fu) protective against evil spirits, who held the peach in awe. In ancient China, peach-wood bows were used to shoot arrows in every direction in an effort to dispel evil. Peach-wood slips or carved pits served as amulets to protect a person's life, safety, and health.

Peach-wood seals or figurines guarded gates and doors, and, as one Han account recites, "the buildings in the capital are made tranquil and pure; everywhere a good state of affairs prevails." Writes the author, further:

Another aid in fighting evil spirits were peach-wood wands. The Li-chi (Han period) reported that the emperor went to the funeral of a minister escorted by a sorcerer carrying a peach-wood wand to keep bad influences away. Since that time, peach-wood wands have remained an important means of exorcism in China.

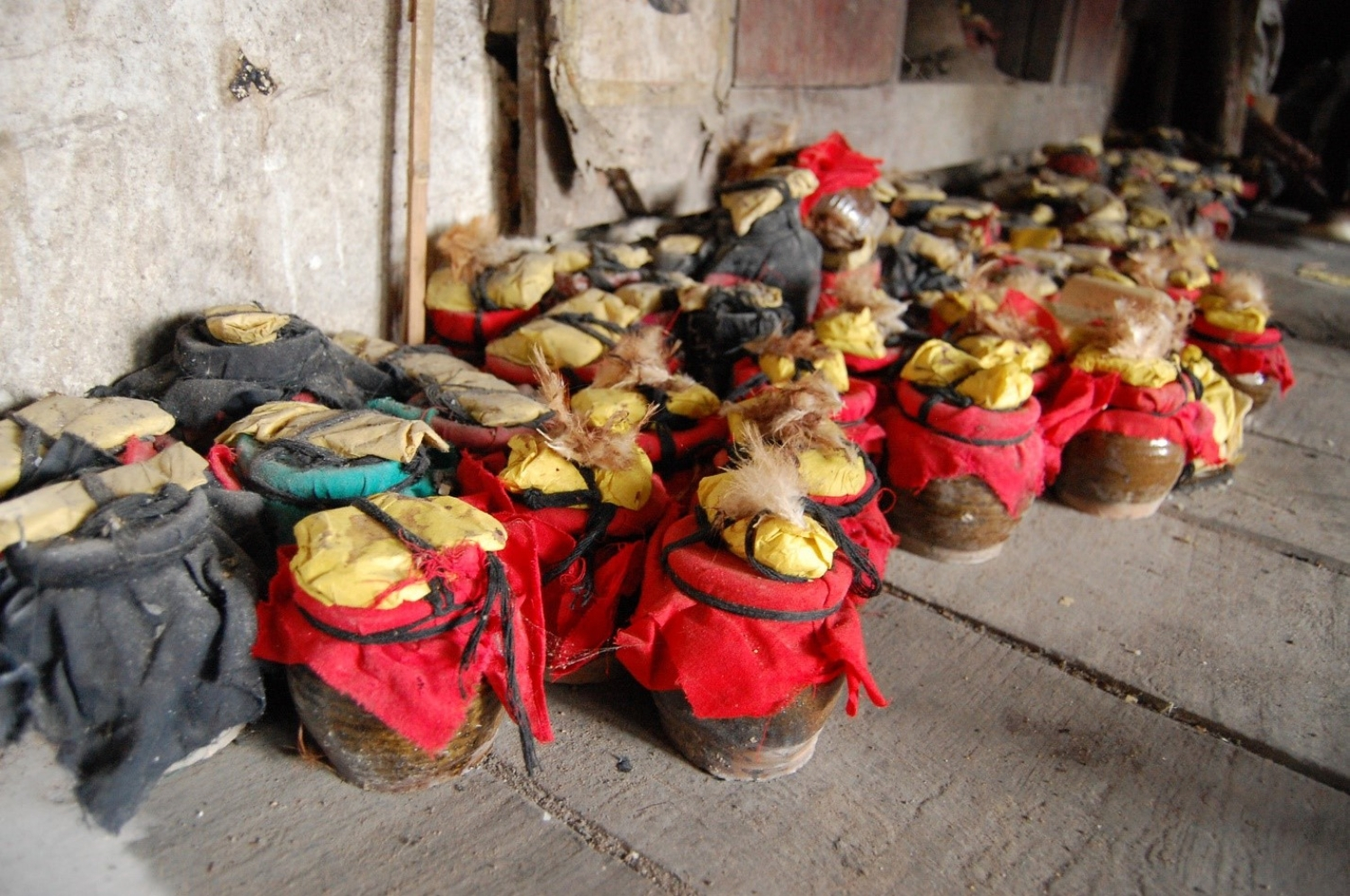
Rows of earthenware jars containing "demonic spirits" on an altar in Hunan

The "captivity" of demons in wellsprings and jars is another common property of ritual masters generally as well as Daoists specifically. The ritual exists in different versions, each with a proper function and title: "Sealing off the Evil Demon's Confinement" (封邪魔禁; feng xiemo jin) and "Collecting Souls" (收魂; shouhun). Among them the general term used for this type of ritual is "Dispatching Talismans" (打符; dafu).

Elsewhere in China it is written that "In fighting evil spirits, an anji can invoke his personal sonma, for example, by offering a chicken. If the anji does not worship his sonma in a fitting manner, he may become sick, or the sonma may leave the anji altogether, causing him to lose his power."

In parts of China bordering and sharing the culture of Nepal, the practice of Shamanism can be found. It is reported that various kinds of shamans are engaged by evil spirits "in either a physical battle or a battle of wits." Shamans are often called upon to fight evil spirits, in many traditions. One story tells of a shaman who, unable to locate a demon who was causing illness to a victim, brought a story-singer, who sang a story of the defeat of a powerful demon so convincingly that the infesting demon came out to aid the demon in the song, and so was able to be defeated.

The Hmong people, found throughout Southeast Asia including in China have an ancient belief in evil spirits and have a well established set of rituals and traditions for encountering demons.

In Shaanbei, shuoshu (traditional storytelling) and yangge (a form of song-and-dance play) were components of exorcism in traditional culture. Other practices include wearing armor and using swords, whips, or martial arts displays to defeat demons and ghosts.

During the Song dynasty, ritual master practices included the use of spirit soldiers to seize and destroy illness-causing demons inside patients' bodies.

Through the Religious policy during the Xi Jinping administration, the People's Republic of China takes a more favorable view towards folk religion, which the PRC has at times past deemed superstition. It has begun various initiatives to "enhance the quality of folk belief," such as making it easier to legally register temples as folk belief sites. As part of the initiatives, some local officials have sought to prohibit practices like exorcism at registered temples.

=== Catholic exorcism in China ===
In 1979, reports of an exorcism in the village of Zhangpuqiapo, near the Catholic pilgrimage site of Sheshan, resulted in tensions between the Catholic Church in China and the government. According to the accounts, a woman was demonically possessed and a married priest who was a member of the Chinese Catholic Patriotic Association failed to exorcise it using the older Latin formulas for expelling demons. Attempts by villagers to take the woman to Sheshan failed (attributed to the woman's supernatural strength) and initial attempts by three women Catholic teachers said to be proficient in expelling demons failed. An account of the exorcism describes one of the women returning with the Eucharist and expelling the demon, which announced that Jesus Christ commanded Chinese Catholics to visit Sheshan the next March. Another account attributed the exorcism to a priest. A Jesuit named Shen Baishun distributed a pamphlet describing the events, stating that the possessed woman had announced that "doomsday will come in the year 2000" and the "Virgin Mary will shine and make an appearance" the next March in Sheshan. The Chinese government contended that this narrative was spread for counterrevolutionary purposes and prosecuted Shen.

== See also ==
- Spiritual warfare in Christianity
