= Popular piety =

Expressions of folk Catholicism

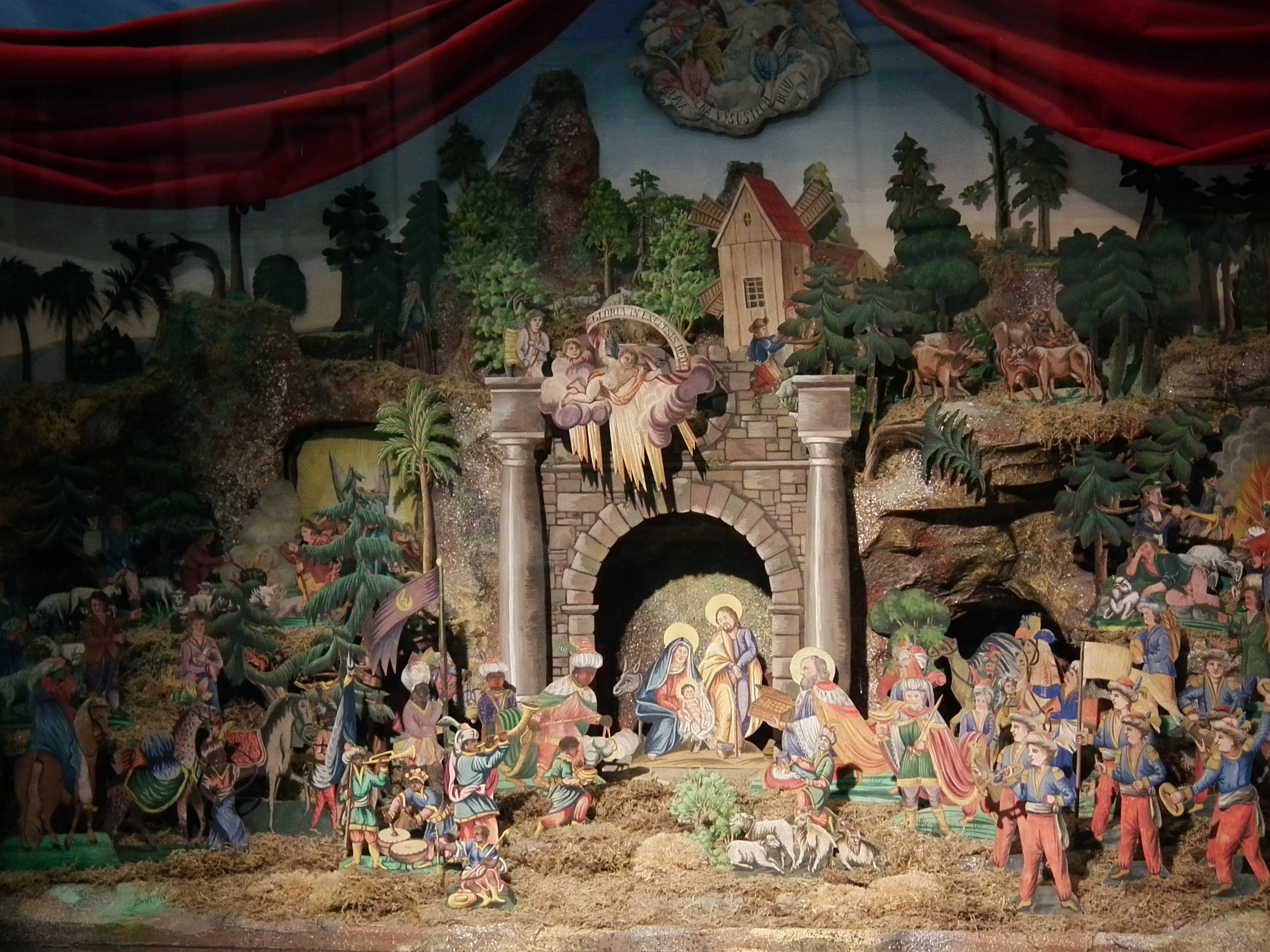
The building of a manger scene in the home is a well-known example of popular piety, influenced by St. Francis of Assisi's crib in Greccio.

Popular piety, in Christianity, is an expression of faith which avails of certain cultural elements proper to a specific environment which is capable of interpreting and questioning in a lively and effective manner the sensibilities of those who live in that same environment. Examples covered in this article are drawn from Roman Catholic and Lutheran practice.

The forms of popular piety lived out in the Roman Catholic Church are explained in the Directory on Popular piety and the liturgy issued by the Congregation for Divine Worship and the Discipline of the Sacraments of the Catholic Church.

In the Lutheran churches, popular piety is expressed through the reception of the sacraments, the displaying of sacred art, the signing of hymnody, prayer, Bible study and devotions.

== Role ==
Popular piety may be defined as those diverse extra-liturgical cultic expressions of a private or community nature which, in the context of the Christian faith, are inspired predominantly by forms deriving from a particular nation or people or from their culture. It frequently finds expression in those external practices of piety commonly referred to as "devotions". These are often characterized by: an appeal to the emotions, a simplicity of form which makes them accessible, a communal aspect, or a traditional connection to some venerated person.

== Historical background ==
During the Middle Ages, the public functions of the Church and the popular devotions of the people were intimately connected. The laity assisted at the prayer of the Liturgy of the hours, the sacrifice of the Mass, the numerous processions, and were quite familiar with the liturgy. Those few religious practices outside official services, e.g. the Rosary (a substitute for the 150 Psalms) originated in the liturgy.

Popular piety is an expression of the profound religious feeling of people at a given moment in space and time. The various sets of "Little Offices" (e.g. of the Passion or of the Blessed Trinity), popular from the thirteenth to sixteenth century are now virtually unknown except to museum archivists.

== Lutheran practices ==
In the Lutheran tradition, popular piety is expressed through the reception of the sacraments, the displaying of sacred art, the signing of hymnody, prayer, Bible study and devotions.

== Roman Catholic practices ==
At the beginning of the modern period, "the primacy accorded to contemplation, the importance attributed to subjectivity and a certain ascetical pragmatism exalting human endeavour ensured that Liturgy no longer appeared as the primary source of the Christian life in the eyes of men and women advanced in the spiritual life." The reform of the Roman liturgy after the Council of Trent brought advantages such as ensuring that the doctrinal content reflected the faith in its purity, but its new fixity made it seem the reserve of the clergy and reinforced a division between liturgy and popular piety.

Popular devotion then followed its own channels, especially since the 16th century. Non-liturgical practices like the Stations of the Cross, the Forty Hours' Devotion, various litanies and rosary-based prayers and chaplets prevailed everywhere; novenas and series of Sundays and weekdays in honour of particular saints or mysteries were instituted. Entire months of the year were given over to special devotions, the most widespread being: January (Holy Name of Jesus); March (Saint Joseph); May (Virgin Mary); June (Sacred Heart); July (Precious Blood); September (Our Lady of Sorrows); October (Rosary); November (Souls in Purgatory).

A renaissance of liturgical worship began in the late 19th century and was advanced by the reforms of Pope Pius X and his 20th-century successors.

The Second Vatican Council asked that popular Catholic devotions "should be so drawn up that they harmonize with the liturgical seasons, accord with the sacred liturgy, are in some fashion derived from it, and lead the people to it, since, in fact, the liturgy by its very nature far surpasses any of them."

The Catholic Church has declared popular piety "a true treasure of the People of God" and decried the attitude of "certain persons concerned with the care of souls who scorn, a priori, devotions of piety which, in their correct forms, have been recommended by the magisterium, who leave them aside and in this way create a vacuum which they do not fill." Furthermore, the heretofore mentioned Directory declares that manifestations of popular piety "are subject to the jurisdiction of the local ordinary. It is for him to regulate such manifestations, to encourage them as a means of assisting the faithful in living the Christian life, and to purify and evangelize them where necessary".

In application of this principle, members of the Church, clergy or laity, individuals or groups, must obtain the local ordinary's permission to promote prayers, formulas or private initiatives in this field. On a level beyond the confines of single dioceses, competence belongs to the Congregation for Divine Worship and the Discipline of the Sacraments.

Pope Francis reflects on the consolation of Christ as a popular Catholic devotion, asking that "no one make light of the fervent devotion of the holy faithful people of God, which in its popular piety seeks to console Christ".

=== Practices of popular piety ===
The Directory on popular piety and the liturgy devotes separate chapters to consideration of practices associated with the liturgical year, such as processions, the Way of the Cross or the crib, the veneration of the Mother of God, the veneration of the other saints, beatified and the holy angels, the suffrage for the dead, as well as shrines and pilgrimages.

Under the heading The language of popular piety, it speaks of gestures, texts and formulae, song and music, sacred music, sacred places and sacred times.

For an overview of some practices that form part of Catholic popular piety, see Catholic devotions.

== See also ==
- Folk Catholicism – Variety of regional or ethnic expressions of Catholicism
- Folk Christianity – Expressions of religion distinct from the doctrines of organized religion
- Folk Orthodoxy – Variety of regional or ethnic syncretic expressions of Eastern Orthodoxy
- Folk religion – Expressions of religion distinct from the doctrines of organized religion
- Piety – Religious devotion or spirituality
