= John L. Messenger =

British philatelist

John Leslie Messenger (14 May 1902 – 24 May 1982) was a British philatelist who signed the Roll of Distinguished Philatelists in 1979.
