= Philipp Bloch =

Philipp Bloch (Hebrew: שרגא בלוך; 30 May 1841 – 3 February 1923) was a German rabbi, historian, and translator.

== Biography ==
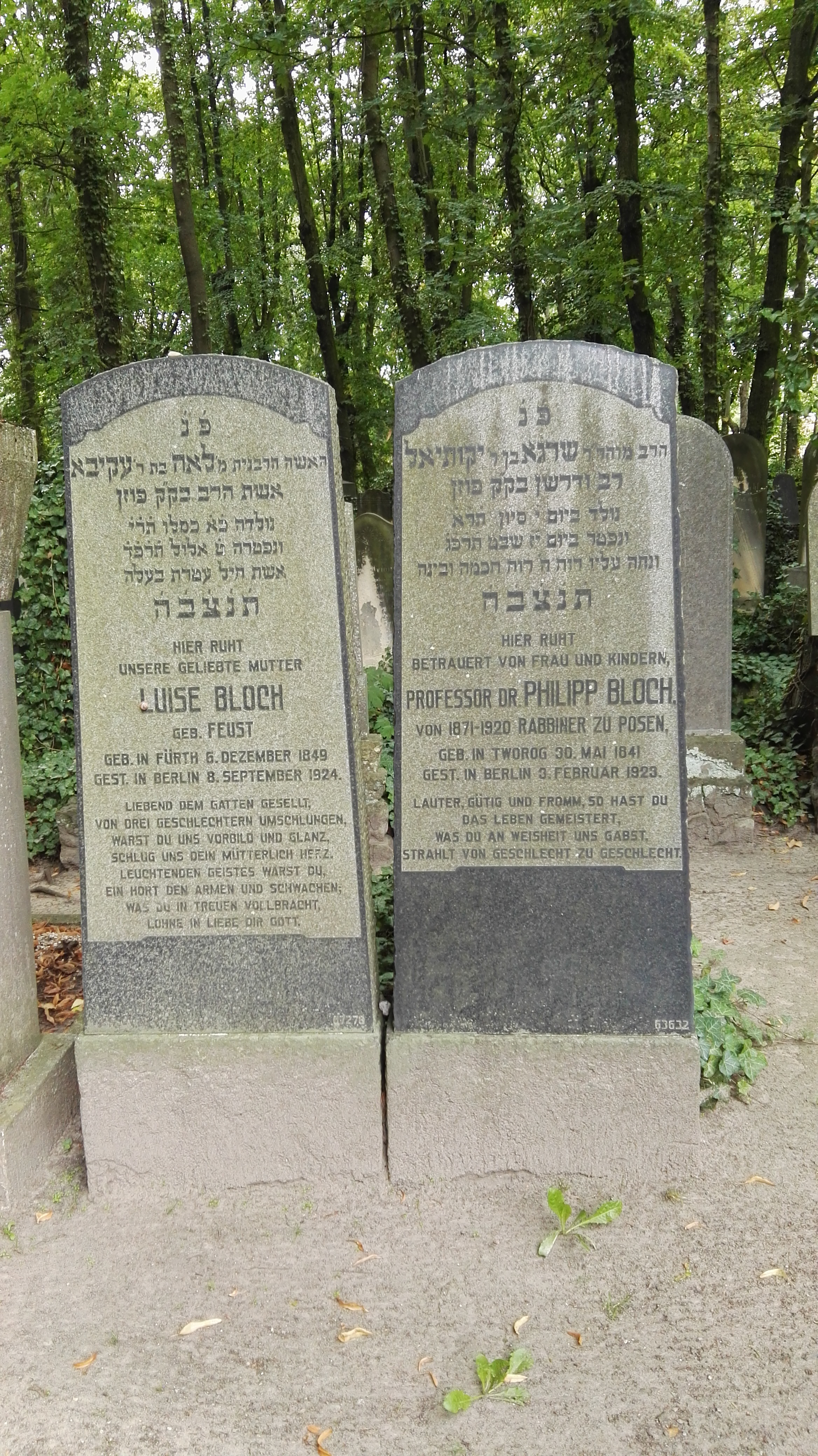
Grave of Philipp Bloch at the Weißensee Cemetery in Berlin.

Bloch studied at the University of Breslau and at the Jewish Theological Seminary of Breslau, where he was a student of Zecharias Frankel, Heinrich Graetz, and Jakob Bernays. He received a Ph. D. in 1864 and was ordained as a rabbi in 1867. He organized a Jewish congregational school in Munich in 1869, and became rabbi of the Israelitische Brüdergemeinde in Posen in 1871.

His early scholarly work concentrated on Jewish religious philosophy and aggadic studies. He later turned to historical research, especially concerning the Jews of Poland.

== Selected publications ==
- Glauben und Wissen. 1879. A translation of the introduction and first book of Saadia Gaon's Emunot ve-De'ot.
- Die Willensfreiheit von Chasdai Kreskas. 1879. Translation and explaination of Chapter 5 of the second treatise of the Or Adonai.
- Die Generalprivilegien der Polnischen Judenschaft. 1892.
- Geschichte der Entwickelung der Kabbalah und der Jüdischen Religionsphilosophie. 1894.
- Heinrich Graetz, a Memoir. Philadelphia: Jewish Publication Society. 1898.
