= Oxford Dictionary of World Religions =

Reference work

The Oxford Dictionary of World Religions is a reference work edited by John Bowker and published by Oxford University Press in the year 1997. It contains over 8,200 entries by leading authorities in the field of religious studies containing a topic index of 13,000 headings. There are over 80 contributors from 13 countries.

The Concise Oxford Dictionary of World Religions is an abbreviated version of the work which appeared in the year 2000.
