= Gershom Scholem =

Israeli philosopher and historian (1897–1982)

- גרשום שלום
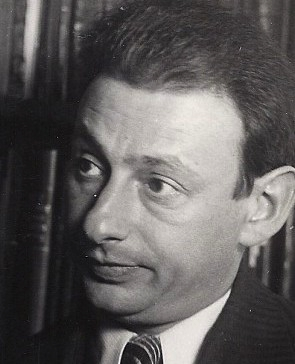
- Scholem, 1935
- Born: Gerhard Scholem; 5 December 1897; Berlin, German Empire
- Died: 21 February 1982 (aged 84); Jerusalem, Israel
- Spouse: Fania Freud Scholem
- Relatives: Werner Scholem (brother)
- Awards: Israel Prize; Bialik Prize

Education
- Education: Frederick William University

Philosophical work
- Era: 20th-century philosophy
- Region: German philosophy Jewish philosophy
- School: Continental philosophy Kabbalah; Wissenschaft des Judentums
- Institutions: Hebrew University of Jerusalem
- Main interests: Philosophy of religion Philosophy of history Mysticism; Messianism
- Notable works: Sabbatai Zevi, the Mystical Messiah; Major Trends in Jewish Mysticism

Gershom Scholem (Hebrew: גֵרְשׁׂם שָׁלוֹם; 5 December 1897 – 21 February 1982) was a German philosopher and historian. Widely regarded as the founder of modern academic study of the Kabbalah, Scholem was appointed the first professor of Jewish mysticism at Hebrew University of Jerusalem.

== Biography ==
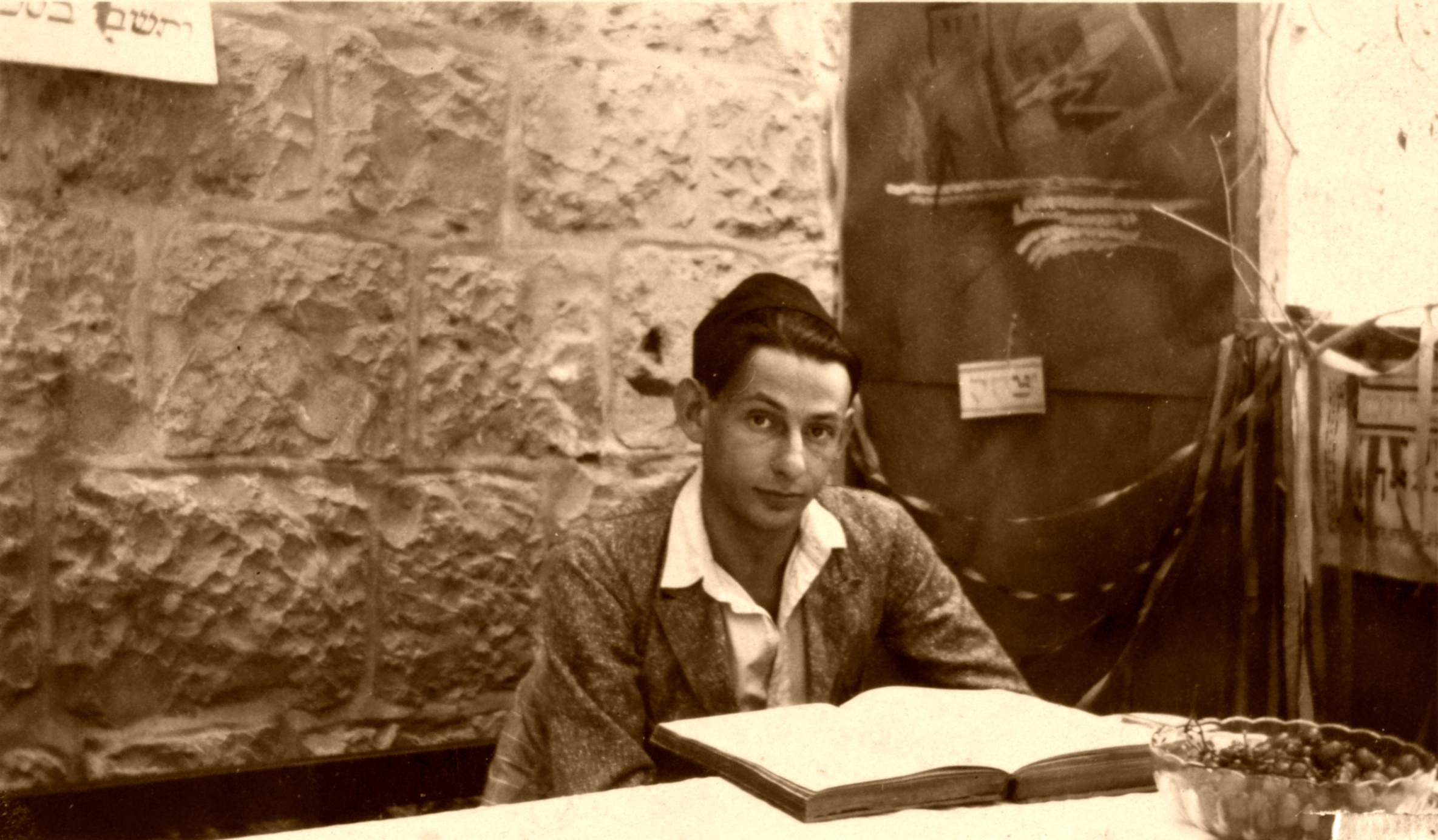
Gershom Scholem sitting in Sukka studying the Zohar, 1925

Gerhard (Gershom) Scholem was born in Berlin to Arthur Scholem and Betty Hirsch Scholem. His father was a printer. His older brother was the German Communist leader Werner Scholem. He studied Hebrew and Talmud with an Orthodox rabbi.

Scholem met Walter Benjamin in Munich in 1915, when the former was seventeen years old and the latter was twenty-three. They began a lifelong friendship that ended when Benjamin committed suicide in 1940 in the wake of Nazi persecution. Scholem dedicated his book Major Trends in Jewish Mysticism (Die jüdische Mystik in ihren Hauptströmungen), based on lectures 1938–1940, to Benjamin. In 1915, Scholem enrolled at the Frederick William University in Berlin (today, Humboldt University), where he studied mathematics, philosophy, and Hebrew. There he met Martin Buber, Shmuel Yosef Agnon, Hayim Nahman Bialik, Ahad Ha'am, and Zalman Shazar.

In Berlin, Scholem befriended Leo Strauss and corresponded with him throughout his life. He studied mathematical logic at the University of Jena under Gottlob Frege. He was in Bern in 1918 with Benjamin when he met Elsa (Escha) Burchhard, who became his first wife. Scholem returned to Germany in 1919, where he received a degree in Semitic languages at the Ludwig-Maximilians-Universität München. Together with Benjamin, he established a fictitious school – the University of Muri.

Scholem wrote his doctoral thesis on the oldest known kabbalistic text, Sefer ha-Bahir. The following year it appeared in book form as "Das Buch Bahir", having been published by his father's publishing house.

Drawn to Zionism and influenced by Buber, he immigrated in 1923 to the British Mandate of Palestine. There Scholem became a librarian, heading the Department of Hebrew and Judaica at the National Library. In 1927, he revamped the Dewey Decimal System, making it appropriate for large Judaica collections. During the period that he was a librarian of ancient manuscripts at the library of Hebrew University, fragments of the newly discovered Dead Sea Scrolls and inventory from the Cairo Genizah moved through the collections he was overseeing. Scholem became a professor of mysticism at the Hebrew University in 1933.

Scholem's brother Werner was a member of the ultra-left "Fischer-Maslow Group" and the youngest ever member of the Reichstag, or Weimar Diet, representing the Communist Party of Germany. He was expelled from the party and later murdered by the Nazis during the Third Reich. Unlike his brother, Gershom was vehemently opposed to both Communism and Marxism. In 1936, he married his second wife, Fania Freud. Fania, who had been his student and could read Polish, was helpful in his later research, particularly in regard to Jacob Frank.

In 1946, Scholem was sent by the Hebrew University to search for Jewish books that had been plundered by the Nazis and help return them to their rightful owners. He spent much of the year in Germany and Central Europe as part of this project, known as "Otzrot HaGolah".

Scholem died in Jerusalem, where he is buried next to his wife in the Sanhedria Cemetery. Jürgen Habermas delivered the eulogy.

== Academic career ==
Scholem became a lecturer at the Hebrew University of Jerusalem. He taught the Kabbalah and mysticism from a scientific point of view and became the first professor of Jewish mysticism at the university in 1933, working in this post until his retirement in 1965, when he became an emeritus professor.

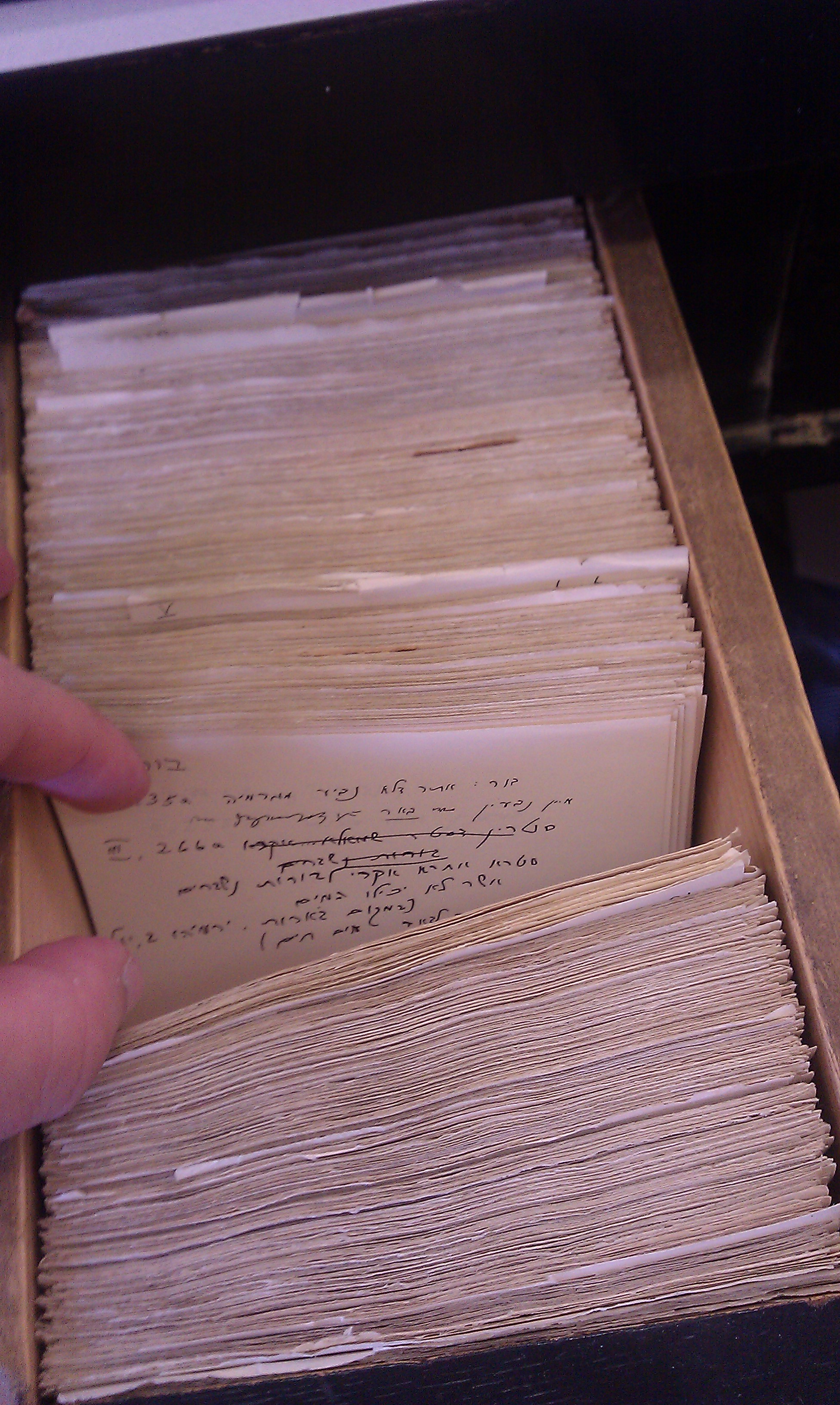
Card catalogue which Gershom Scholem used to write his notes

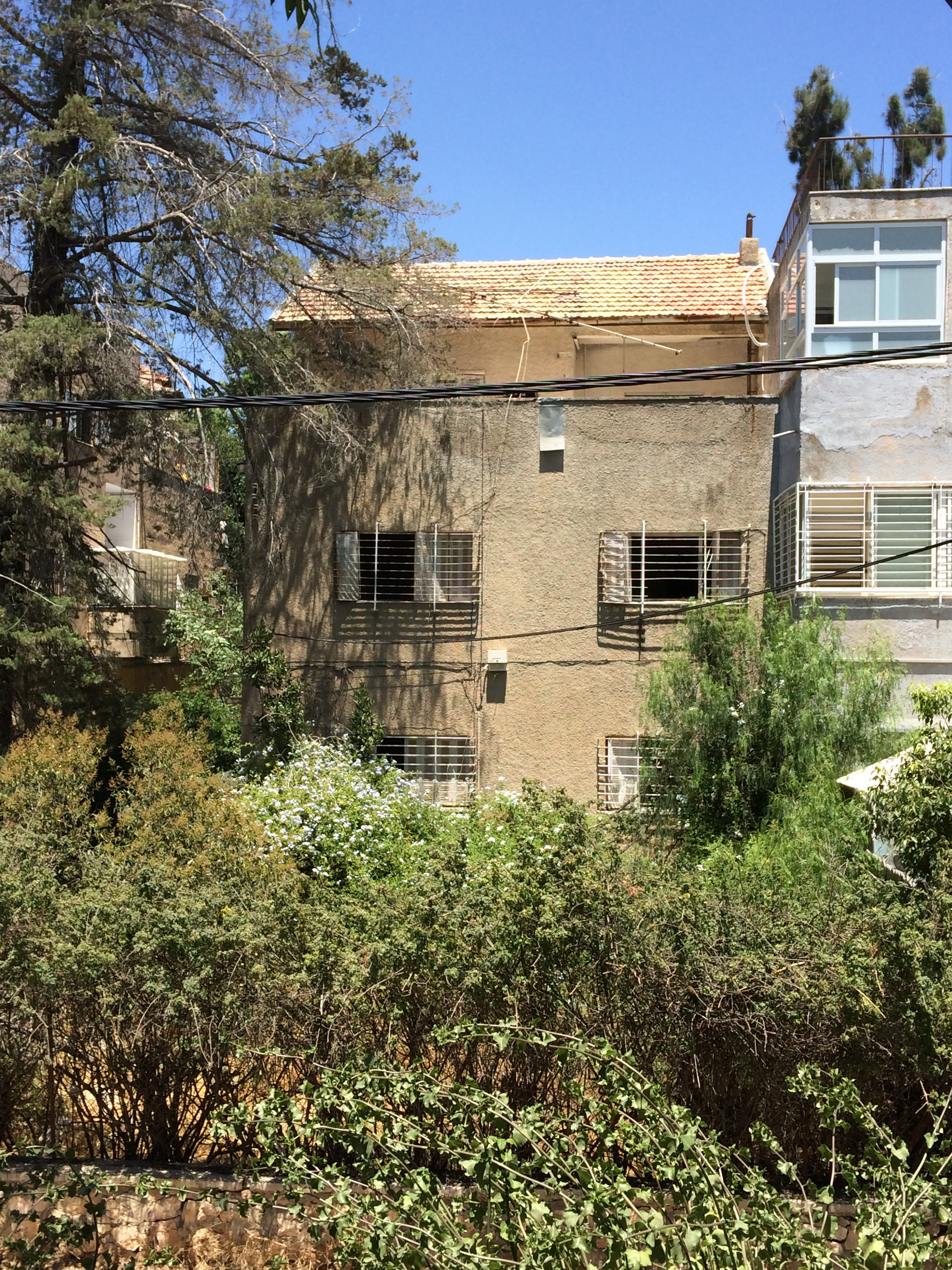
Gershom Scholem House, 28 Abarbanel Street, Jerusalem

Scholem directly contrasted his historiographical approach on the study of Jewish mysticism with the approach of the 19th-century school of the Wissenschaft des Judentums ("Science of Judaism"), which sought to submit the study of Judaism to the discipline of subjects such as history, philology, and philosophy. According to Jeremy Adler, Scholem's thinking was "both recognizably Jewish and deeply German," and "changed the course of twentieth-century European thought."

At the time Scholem entered his field of study, Jewish mysticism was acknowledged as Judaism's weakest scholarly link by many of the scholars, publishers and cultural leaders of the Jewish community and gentile German scholars who sponsored Scholem's early career, including Martin Buber, Salman Schocken, Franz Rosenzweig, Robert Eisler, Philipp Bloch, Moses Marx, Clemens Baumker, Fritz Hommel and Walter Benjamin.

Scholem told the story of his early research "at the start of my path" in 1922 when he went to Berlin to visit "the only Jewish scholar who had engaged in the study of Kabbalah in the previous generation." Gesturing at the rabbi's library of documents, manuscripts and autographs written by the authors of the Kabbalah, some of which had been inscribed in early modern or medieval centuries, Scholem remarked, "How wonderful it is, Herr Professor, that you have read and learned all this!" to which "...the elderly gentleman replied: 'What! And I also have to read all this nonsense?!" (Though he does not mention the name of the Rabbi in his canonical account of this visit, Scholem explains elsewhere that this scholar—once the Rabbi of Poznań—was Phillip Bloch.)

The analysis of Judaism carried out by the Wissenschaft school was flawed in two ways, according to Scholem: It studied Judaism as a dead object rather than as a living organism; and it did not consider the proper foundations of Judaism, the non-rational force that, in Scholem's view, made the religion a living thing.

In Scholem's opinion, the mythical and mystical components were at least as important as the rational ones, and he thought that they, rather than the minutiae of Halakha, were the truly living core of Judaism. In particular, he disagreed with what he considered to be Martin Buber's personalization of Kabbalistic concepts as well as what he argued was an inadequate approach to Jewish history, Hebrew language, and the land of Israel.

In the worldview of Scholem, the research of Jewish mysticism could not be separated from its historical context. Starting from something similar to the Gegengeschichte of Friedrich Nietzsche, he ended up including less normative aspects of Judaism in the public history.

Specifically, Scholem in his scholarly writing that Jewish history could be divided into three periods:

- During the Biblical period, monotheism battles mythology without completely defeating it.
- During the Talmudic period, some of the institutions—for example, the notion of the magical power of the accomplishment of the Sacraments—are removed in favour of the purer concept of the divine transcendence.
- During the medieval period, the impossibility of reconciling the abstract concept of God of ancient Greek philosophy with the personal God of the Bible, led Jewish thinkers, such as Maimonides, to try to eliminate the remaining myths and to modify the figure of the living God. After this time, mysticism, as an effort to find again the essence of the God of their fathers, became more widespread.

Elsewhere, in oral presentation or informal reflection, Scholem inflected the three periods within a different frame of reference: there was the primordial inscription and enunciation of the Law in the Torah and the Talmud, the mystical reflections of the Kabbalah, and the post-metaphysical phase of mystical writings represented by (for example) the writings of Franz Kafka or the critical mysticism of his friend and correspondent Walter Benjamin. Scholem often told his students that the modern reader must read Franz Kafka in order to enter into the frame of mind native to the Kabbalah, and elsewhere remarked that, "among the peculiarities" Benjamin's writings was its "enormous suitability for canonization; I might almost say for quotation as a kind of Holy Writ."

The notion of the three periods, with its interactions between rational and irrational elements in Judaism, led Scholem to put forward some controversial arguments. He thought that the 17th century messianic movement, known as Sabbateanism, was developed from the Lurianic Kabbalah. In order to neutralize Sabbateanism, Hasidism had emerged as a Hegelian synthesis. Many of those who joined the Hasidic movement, because they had seen in it an Orthodox congregation, considered it scandalous that their community should be associated with a heretical movement.

In the same way, Scholem produced the hypothesis that the source of the 13th century Kabbalah was a Jewish gnosticism that preceded Christian gnosticism.

The historiographical approach of Scholem also involved a linguistic theory. In contrast to Buber, Scholem believed in the power of the language to invoke supernatural phenomena. In contrast to Walter Benjamin, he put the Hebrew language in a privileged position with respect to other languages, as the only language capable of revealing the divine truth. His special regard for the spiritual potency of the Hebrew language was expressed in his 1926 letter to Franz Rosenzweig regarding his concerns over the "secularization" of Hebrew. Scholem considered the Kabbalists as interpreters of a pre-existent linguistic revelation.

== Scholem and the Kabbalah ==
Scholem is acknowledged as the single most significant figure in the recovery, collection, annotation, and registration into rigorous Jewish scholarship of the canonical bibliography of mysticism and scriptural commentary that runs through its primordial phase in the Sefer Yetzirah, its inauguration in the Bahir, its exegesis in the Pardes and the Zohar to its cosmogonic, apocalyptic climax in Isaac Luria's Ein Sof that is known collectively as Kabbalah.

After generations of demoralization and assimilation in the European Enlightenment, the disappointment of messianic hopes, the famine of 1916 in Palestine, and in the midst of the catastrophe of the Final Solution in Europe Scholem gathered and reassembled these sacred texts from many of the archives that had been disarranged, orphaned, confiscated under Nazi rule or otherwise washed up in Genizah in the middle east. Scholem began cataloging the flood of fragments and disordered, decontextualized manuscripts into an annotated and relatively organized sequence of texts available to scholars and seekers within the reception of this tradition in his 1930 bibliography of the Kabbalah, expanding this bibliography in his later works until the end of his life. Many other Jewish scholars assisted in this process of recovery once it was underway, but it is broadly recognized that Scholem initiated this process of textual and archival recovery and rebirth.

As Scholem points out in his memoirs, the canon of sacred Jewish writings from the diaspora and the Middle Ages (re: "Kabbalah") had fallen into such a state of disrepair and oblivion—fragmented and effaced by persecutions from without as well as contortions, conversions and schisms from within Judaism—that many of the "finest writings..." from the major currents of Jewish mysticism could only be found in long block quotations in antisemitic texts, where some "nincompoop who had quoted and translated the most wonderful, the most profound things," had assembled them "in order to decry them as blasphemies." (This was a strong, somewhat exaggerated statement for expressive effect that Scholem attributes to Ernst Bloch in his memoirs—but there he co-signs the sentiment and appropriates it as his own description of the state of affairs in other places.)

Due to Scholem's efforts, and those of his students and colleagues, the confused and inscrutable condition of Kabbalistic bibliography and provenance would be significantly remedied after the end of the World Wars and the foundation of the modern state of Israel where Scholem worked as head librarian of the National Library in Jerusalem.

== Friends, colleagues and canonical affinities ==
Scholem's closest peers included, most famously, Walter Benjamin and Leo Strauss.

Though his relationship with Franz Rosenzweig was of shorter duration, it was also a deeply influential one. Likewise, though Scholem was never directly introduced to Franz Kafka, he found out later in life that Kafka approved of his comments in a debate. Scholem and Benjamin's discussions of Kafka, spanning decades, played no small role in the elevation Kafka's literary and epistolary writings to canonical status in both secular and mystical literature as writing that was prophetic or premonitory of the Holocaust while also having qualities of a kind of post-metaphysical kabbalah.

It is a measure of the depth of Scholem's friendship with Benjamin that he wrote two memoirs at the end of his life: his own autobiography tends to be less read or frequently cited than his "Autobiography of a Friendship" recounting his lifelong relationship and work in partnership with Benjamin prior to the latter's death in flight from the Gestapo in 1940. In addition to his Kabbalah scholarship, a significant portion of Scholem's working life postwar was spent recovering, editing and promoting the literary estate of his dead friend.

Martin Buber was a patron, publisher and sponsor of the careers of both Scholem and his best friend Benjamin (despite Benjamin's frequent ingratitude and incorrigible blowing of deadlines and Scholem's occasionally scathing critiques of the elder figure).

Though Scholem's relationships with Hannah Arendt, Theodor Adorno, Hans Jonas, and Ernst Bloch were more characteristically turbulent than those relationship just mentioned, the frequent citation of these figures in Scholem's published writings and private correspondence demonstrates that they were among his closest and most influential colleagues. Selected letters from his correspondence with thinkers, critics and philosophers have been published.

Though appearing as a friend and protegé late in his career, Cynthia Ozick merits mention among those in Scholem's inner-circle. His late-career relationships with Allen Ginsberg, Harold Bloom, and George Steiner were also significant (though his relationship with Steiner was, characteristically, somewhat combative). Scholem was also friendly with the author Shai Agnon and the Talmudic scholar Saul Lieberman.

As a major, unofficial but widely acknowledged figurehead of mystical, historical and theological currents within both Reform and (much more controversially) Conservative Judaism after World War II and the Destruction of the European Jewry in the Holocaust, Scholem's stature within Jewish tradition is roughly comparable to the role played before the First World War and during the interwar period by Martin Buber.

== Debate with Hannah Arendt ==
In the aftermath of the Adolf Eichmann trial in Jerusalem, Scholem sharply criticised Hannah Arendt's book, Eichmann in Jerusalem and decried her lack of solidarity with the Jewish people (Hebrew: אהבת ישראל "love of one's fellow Jews", ʾahəvaṯ ʾiśrāʾēl). Arendt responded that she never loved any collective group, and that she does not love the Jewish people but was only part of them. The bitter fight, which was exchanged in various articles, led to a rift between Scholem and Arendt though they remained mutually respectful thereafter and continued to work alongside one another on various projects, particularly in their work on the literary estate of Walter Benjamin. In an apparently wrathful moment, Scholem wrote to Hans Paeschke that he "knew Hannah Arendt when she was a socialist or half-communist and... when she was a Zionist. I am astounded by her ability to pronounce upon movements in which she was once so deeply engaged, in terms of a distance measured in light years and from such sovereign heights." Differing perspectives on the appropriate penalty for Adolph Eichmann further illuminate differences between the two authors. Whereas Arendt felt that Eichmann should be executed, Scholem was opposed, fearing that his execution would serve to alleviate the Germans' collective sense of guilt.

== Awards and recognition ==
- In 1958, Scholem was awarded the Israel Prize in Jewish studies.
- In 1968, he was elected president of the Israel Academy of Sciences and Humanities.
- In 1969, he received the Yakir Yerushalayim (Worthy Citizen of Jerusalem) award.
- In 1977, he was awarded the Bialik Prize for Jewish thought.

== Literary influence ==
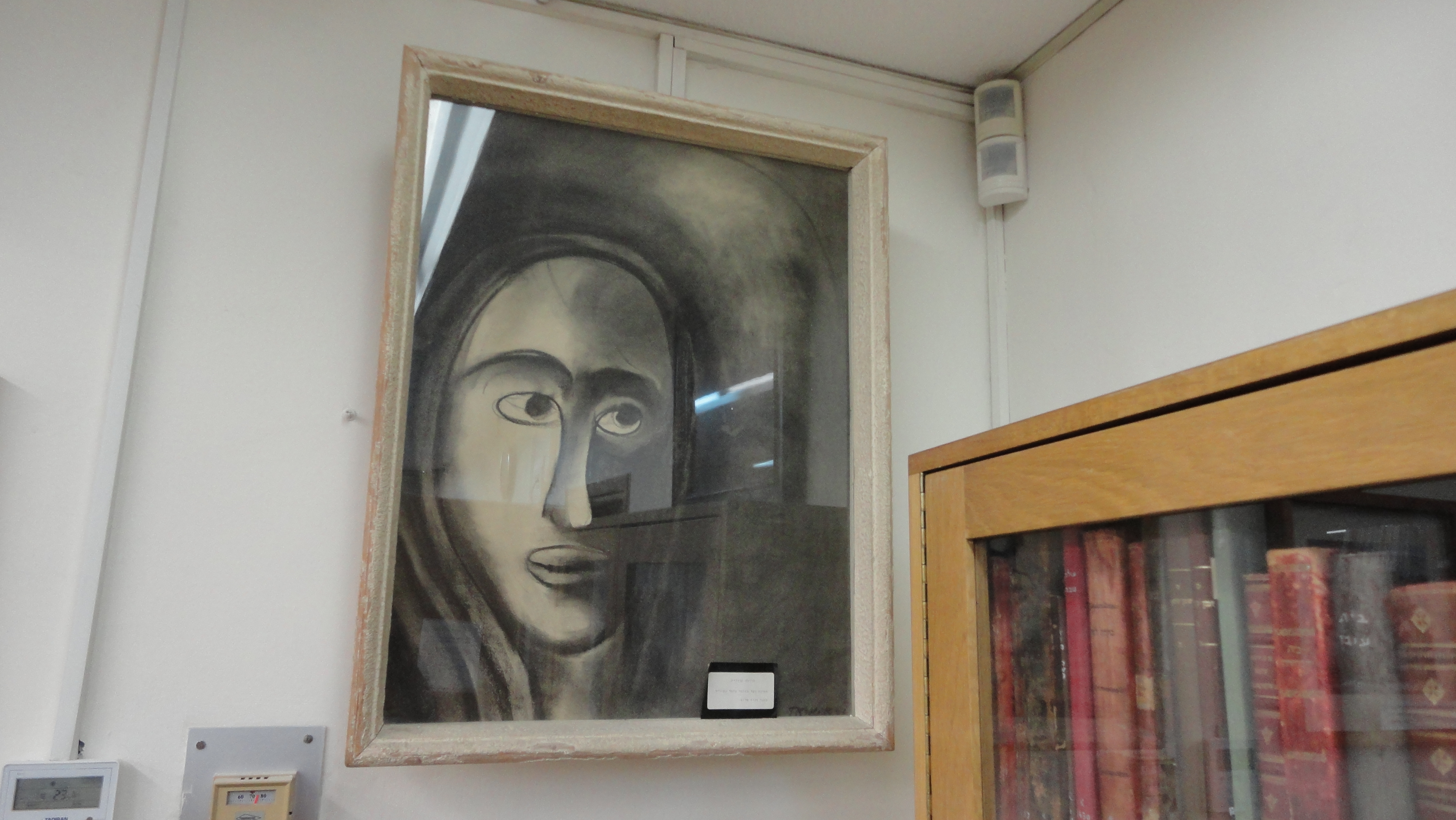
1947 drawing by Trude Krolik of the young Scholem "Baal HaZohar" (Master of the Zohar), in the Scholem collection, National Library of Israel (Hebrew University), Jerusalem

Various stories and essays of the Argentinian writer Jorge Luis Borges were inspired or influenced by Scholem's books. He has also influenced ideas of Umberto Eco, Jacques Derrida, Harold Bloom, Italian philosopher Giorgio Agamben, and George Steiner. American author Michael Chabon cites Scholem's essay, The Idea of the Golem, as having assisted him in conceiving the Pulitzer-Prize winning book The Amazing Adventures of Kavalier and Clay. The same essay influenced, and is cited by, Bruce Chatwin's Utz. Chaim Potok's The Book of Lights features a lightly disguised Scholem as "Jacob Keter."

== Selected works in English ==
- Major Trends in Jewish Mysticism, 1941
- Jewish Gnosticism, Merkabah Mysticism, and the Talmudic Tradition, 1960
- Arendt and Scholem, "Eichmann in Jerusalem: Exchange of Letters between Gershom Scholem and Hannah Arendt", in Encounter, 22/1, 1964
- On the Kabbalah and Its Symbolism, 1965
- The Messianic Idea in Judaism and other Essays on Jewish Spirituality, trans. 1971
- Sabbatai Sevi: The Mystical Messiah, 1973
- Kabbalah, Meridian 1974, Plume Books 1987 reissue: ISBN 0-452-01007-1
- On Jews and Judaism in Crisis: Selected Essays, 1976
- From Berlin to Jerusalem: Memories of My Youth, 1977; trans. Harry Zohn, 1980.
- Walter Benjamin: the Story of a Friendship, trans. Harry Zohn. New York: Schocken Books, 1981.
- Origins of the Kabbalah, JPS, 1987 reissue: ISBN 0-691-02047-7
- Zohar — The Book of Splendor: Basic Readings from the Kabbalah, ed., 1995
- On the Mystical Shape of the Godhead: Basic Concepts in the Kabbalah, 1997
- The Fullness of Time: Poems, trans. Richard Sieburth, 2003
- On History and Philosophy of History, in "Naharaim: Journal for German-Jewish Literature and Cultural History", v, 1–2 (2011), pp. 1–7.
- On Franz Rosenzweig and his Familiarity with Kabbala Literature, in "Naharaim: Journal for German-Jewish Literature and Cultural History", vi, 1 (2012), pp. 1–6.
- On the Possibility of Jewish Mysticism in Our Time, 1994.
- From Frankism to Jacobinism, 2019

== See also ==
- Martin Buber
- Abraham Joshua Heschel
- Joseph Dan
- Rachel Elior
- Arthur Green
