= Major Trends in Jewish Mysticism =

1941 book by Gershom Scholem

Major Trends in Jewish Mysticism is a work on the history of the Jewish Kabbalah by Gershom Scholem, published in 1941.

The contents of the book were first assembled in the order in which they will finally appear as a series of lectures delivered in 1938 at the Jewish Theological Seminary in New York, where he had been invited by Shalom Spiegel to give a course on Kabbalah. (Two of the eleven chapters or lectures appearing in the book, were delivered on other occasions as Scholem points out in the foreword).

In a letter to Walter Benjamin written March 25th of that year, Scholem notes that all of his lectures have now been delivered such that he would be free to spend the remainder of his visit (lasting until that June) reviewing the Kabbalistic manuscripts available in the library of the seminary. Thus the lectures were delivered between January and March. The historical backdrop and the timing of these lectures gives some context of the atmosphere in these lectures: A public decree that Adolf Hitler will assume absolute command of the German Army, having dismissed his former field-marshal, goes into effect on February 4th, 1938 shortly after the lectures would have begun and the Wehrmacht rolls into Austria inaugurating the Anschluss (Germany's annexation of Austria into the Third Reich) March 12th of that year during the final weeks of the course.

== Trends ==
In his introduction to Major Trends in Jewish Mysticism, Scholem blames Jewish scholars of the Haskalah period, who, because of what he decried their antagonism and neglect of the study of Kabbalah, allowed the field be all but monopolized by "charlatans and dreamers".

Scholem's chapter on Merkabah mysticism and Jewish gnosticism deals mainly with the mystical books the Lesser Hechalot and the Greater Hechalot, tracts written and edited between the 2nd and 6th centuries C.E. Scholem also writes on other tracts like Shiur Koma, the Book of Enoch, Sefer Yetzira and the Sefer Habahir.

In the book, Scholem, citing other scholars, observed similarities between the Sefer Yetzirah (Book of Creation) and early Islamic gnosticism. Scholem subsequently explores the works of the German Jewish school of Hasidim, and of the works of Abraham Abulafia. Next, the most detailed investigation in Scholem's work is on the best known work of Jewish mysticism, the Zohar. After that, Scholem explores Isaac Luria's teachings, Sabbatai Zevi and the Eastern European Hasidic movement.

== Commemoration ==
On the 50th anniversary of the book's publication, a conference of scholars convened in Berlin in Scholem's honor.
