= Isenburg Castle =

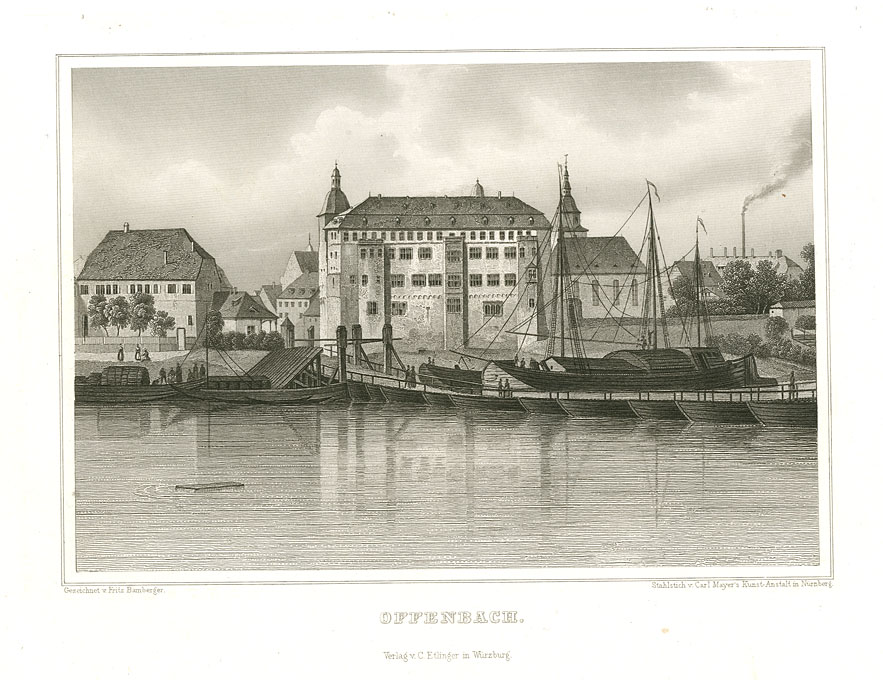
Isenburg Castle on a steel engraving from 1847

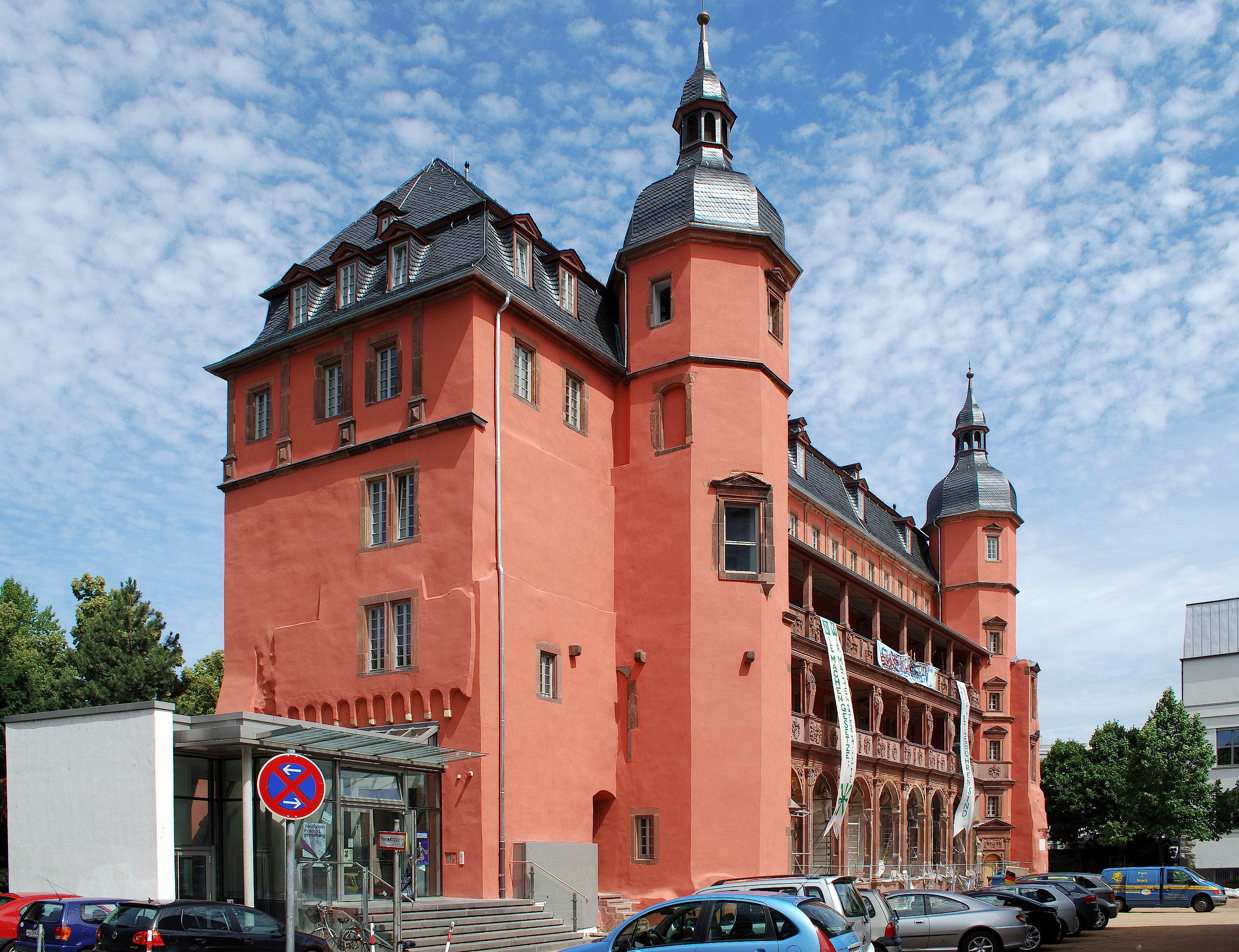
The south side facing Schlossplatz

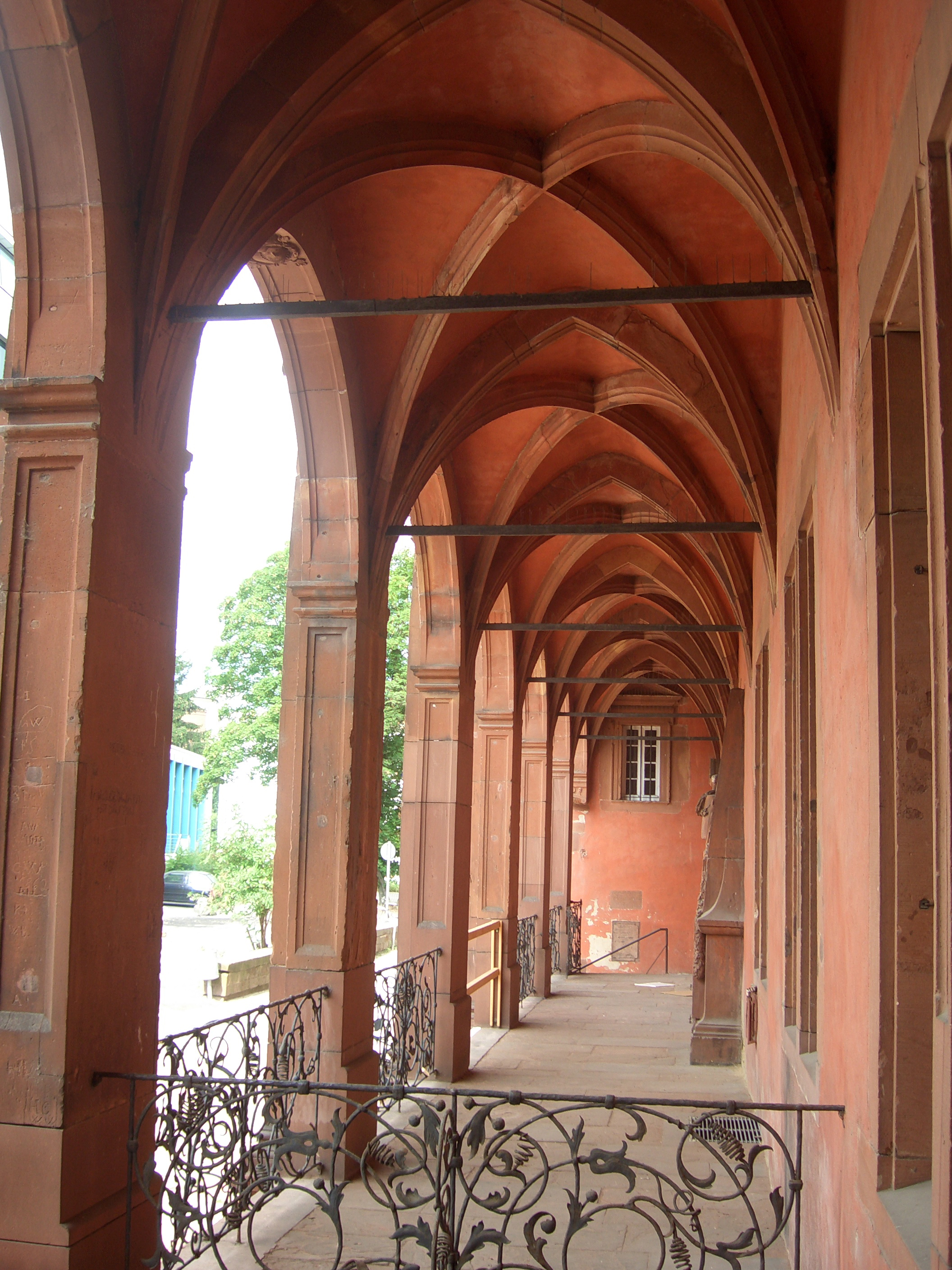
The archway with ribbed vault on the ground floor of the castle

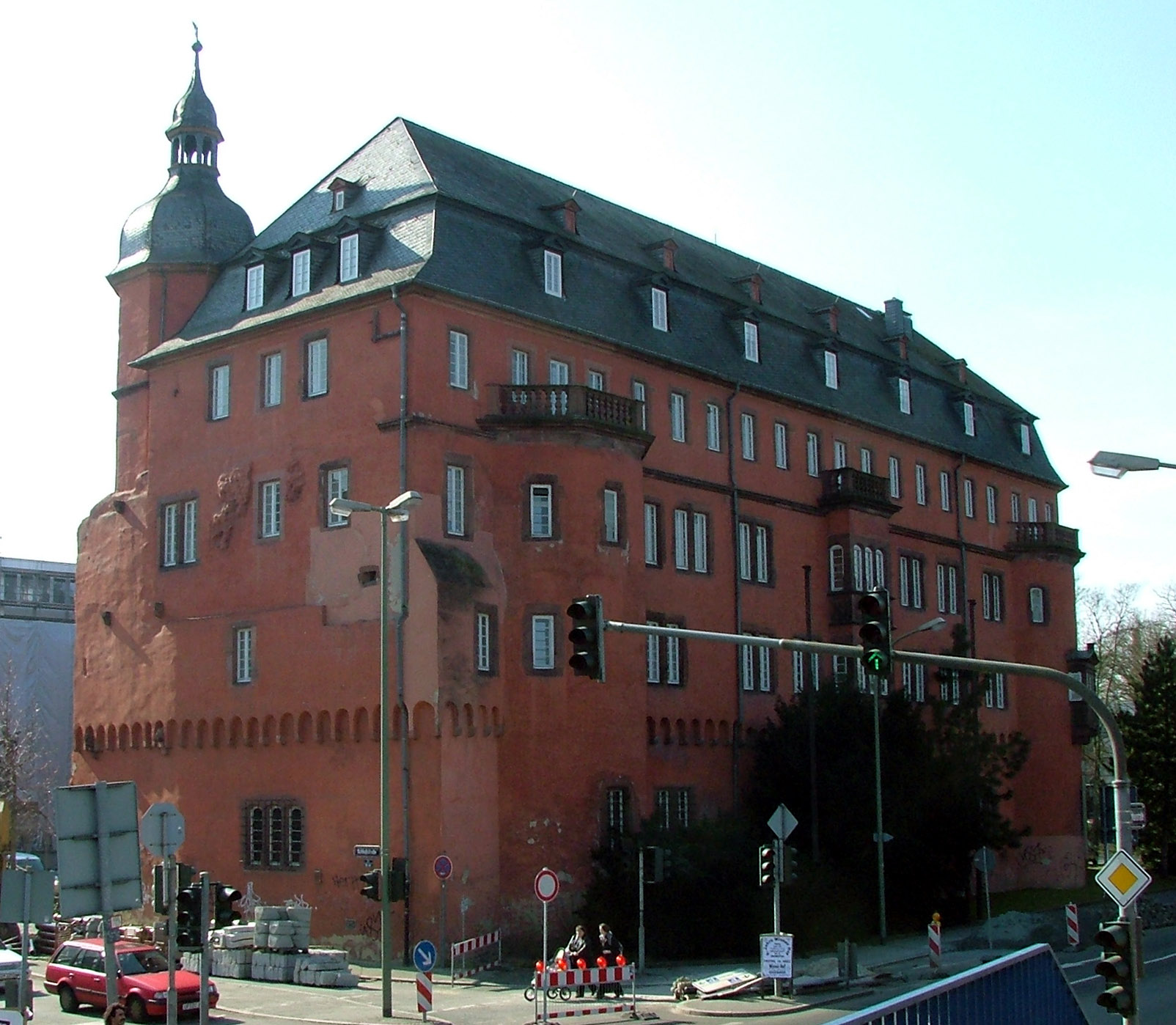
North view with Rhine view

Isenburg Castle is a Renaissance-style castle in Offenbach am Main. It was built in the 16th century by the House of Isenburg. Art historians consider Isenburg Castle to be an important Renaissance building north of the alps. This is evident in the differently designed facades on the north and south sides of the castle. The south side facing the city features a relaxed Renaissance facade with arcades between two stair towers, while the north side facing the Main River has a fortified facade made from parts of the older structure. The castle was originally planned as a four-winged castle. However, this construction project was never carried out.

== History ==
A moated castle built in 1394 by Werner von Falkenstein is considered to be the predecessor of Isenburg Castle. The Renaissance castle was completed in 1559, but burned down completely in 1564. It was subsequently rebuilt. Isenburg Castle has hosted several historically significant congresses, including the 1741 reform of the imperial constitution. During the Thirty Years' War, King Gustav II Adolf of Sweden resided here in order to persuade the Frankfurt councilors to surrender their city.

Until 1748, Isenburg Castle was the residence of the Counts of Isenburg-Offenbach. After the Counts of Isenburg were elevated to princes in 1748, they no longer used the castle as their residence, but instead moved into more comfortable houses in the center of town. After that, it remained in the possession of the Princes of Isenburg and Büdingen in Birstein. Prince Wolfgang Ernst II of Isenburg and Büdingen was known for his religious toleration. In 1787, he ceded Isenburg Castle to the leader of Frankism, Jakob Joseph Frank, who had attempted convert the Eastern Jewish shtetl with his messianic message of salvation in Poland-Lithuania, but was repeatedly excommunicated by traditional Judaism. Baptized by the Roman Catholic Church and ennobled, he was later accused of heresy and banished from Poland. The Prince of Isenburg thus gave protection to him. Frank resided in Isenburg Castle until his death in 1791, living in seclusion as the self-proclaimed Baron of Offenbach with around 400 followers in Offenbach, who outwardly led the life of emigrated Polish nobles. After Frank's death, his daughter Eva Frank became mistress of Isenburg Castle. She died in 1816.

Until 1883, landscape and history painter Leopold Bode had a studio in the castle, and the building continued to play an important role in the painter's work later on.

In 1900, the castle passed from private ownership to the Grand Duchy of Hesse-Darmstadt. At the end of World War II, the castle was severely damaged.

Under the direction of architect Paul Friedrich Posenenske, the palace was rebuilt between 1952 and 1956 (work begun by Erwin Schwarzer) and prepared for use as a state building authority. Numerous details on the exterior were painstakingly restored, but later decorative elements were removed. In September 1956, the Offenbach Youth Welfare Office opened a youth center, the “Haus der offenen Tür” (House of Open Doors), on the first and part of the second floor, which later became known as the “Kinder-, Jugend- & Kulturzentrum - Isenburger Schloss” (Isenburg Castle Children's, Youth, and Cultural Center). On February 28, 1997, the youth facility closed. Replacement premises at Sandgasse 26 were not occupied until 2001.

In 1977, the castle was painted orange-red. Around the year 2000, the interior of the castle was renovated again, and from 2007 onwards, the façade was renovated.

== The castle today ==
Today, Isenburg Castle is part of the campus of the Offenbach University of Art and Design. It houses the photography department and the computer lab. Initially, Adam Jankowski's painting class was also located in the building until it moved to larger premises in the streat nearby. The ground floor is used for events.

== Literature ==
- Rolf Müller (Hrsg.): Schlösser, Burgen, alte Mauern. Herausgegeben vom Hessendienst der Staatskanzlei, Wiesbaden 1990, ISBN 3-89214-017-0, p. 284f.
- Georg Ulrich Großmann: Südhessen. Kunstreiseführer. Imhof, Petersberg 2004, ISBN 3-935590-66-0, p. 155f.
