= Jonathan Eybeschutz =

Rabbi and Talmudist accused of secret Sabbatean beliefs (1690–1764)

- יהונתן אייבשיץ
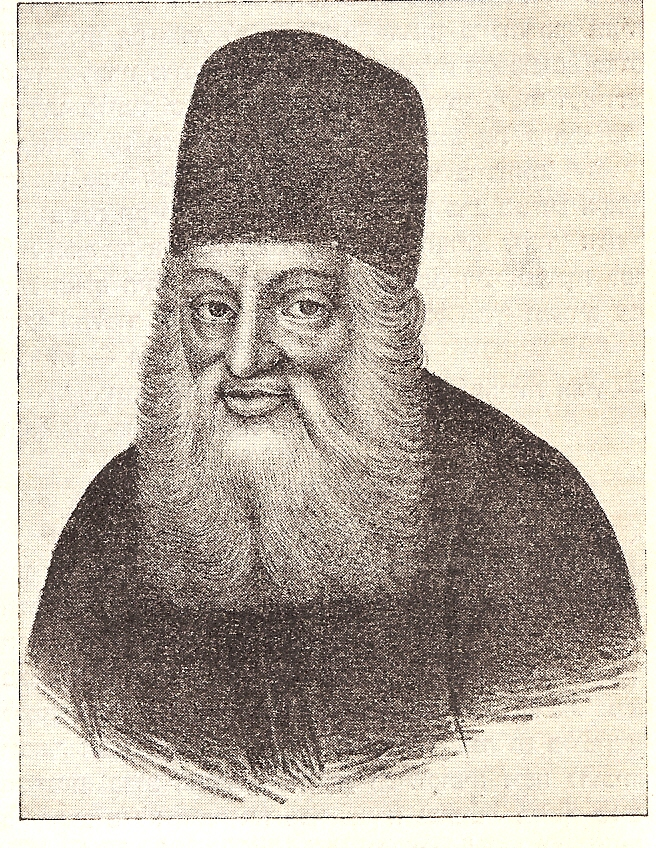
- Painting attributed to Jonathan Eybeschutz

Personal life
- Born: c. 1690 Kraków, Polish–Lithuanian Commonwealth
- Died: 18 September 1764 (aged 73–74) Altona, Duchy of Holstein, Holy Roman Empire
- Resting place: Jewish Cemetery Altona
- Notable works: Ya'arot Devash; Urim veTummim; Kereti uPeleti
- Occupation: Rabbi; posek; darshan

Religious life
- Religion: Judaism

Jonathan Eybeschutz (Note: Eybeschutz's first name is alternatively cited as "Yonatan", and his last name is alternatively cited as "Eybeschütz", "Eibeschütz", "Eibenschütz" and "Eybenschütz".) (Yiddish: יהונתן אייבשיץ; c. 1690 – 18 September 1764) was a Rabbi, Talmudist, halakhist, and kabbalist, known for his conflict with Jacob Emden in the Emden–Eybeschutz Controversy. Eybeschutz served as the Dayan of Prague, and later as the Rabbi of the "Three Communities" of Altona, Hamburg, and Wandsbek.

== Biography ==
Eybeschutz was born around 1690 in Kraków (Note: Also cited as Pińczów.), Polish–Lithuanian Commonwealth (present-day Poland) to Rabbi Nosson Nota. Around 1700, Eybeschutz moved to Eibenschütz, Margraviate of Moravia (present-day Ivančice, Czech Republic) where his father had been appointed Rabbi.

Eybeschutz was a illui (Talmudic prodigy child); on his father's death, he studied in the yeshiva of Meir Eisenstadt in Prossnitz (now Prostějov), and then later in Holleschau (now Holešov in the Zlín Region). He also lived in Vienna for a short time. He married Elkele Spira, daughter of Isaac Spira-Fraenkel, and they lived in Hamburg for two years with Mordecai ha-Kohen, Elkele's maternal grandfather.

At eighteen, Eybeschutz was appointed rabbi of Bolesławiec, where he stayed for three years. Afterward, he settled in Prague in 1711 and became rosh yeshiva and a famous preacher. The people of Prague held Eybeschutz in high esteem, and he was considered second only to Chief Rabbi David Oppenheim.

In Prague, Eybeschutz received permission to print the Talmud, but with the omission of all passages contradicting the principles of Christianity, in consultation with Chief Rabbi David Oppenheim. Legends and rumors seeking to discredit the event said that he did this without the consultation of the Prague rabbis, and they revoked the printing license.

In 1724, in Prague, he was suspected of being a Sabbatean. Despite denouncing the Sabbatean movement on Yom Kippur, the accusations continued. Therefore, in 1736, Eybeschutz was only appointed dayan of Prague and not chief rabbi. He became rabbi of Metz in 1741 and, in 1750, was elected rabbi of the "Three Communities:" Altona, Hamburg, and Wandsbek.

In July 1725, the Ashkenazi beth din of Amsterdam issued a ban of ḥerem "excommunication" on Sabbateans (Hebrew: כַּת הַמַּאֲמִינִים, romanized: kaṯ hammaʾaminim, lit. 'Sect of the Believers'). Sabbatean writings found by the beth din at that time were attributed to Eybeschutz. In early September, similar excommunication proclamations were issued by the batei din of Frankfurt an der Oder and the triple community of Altona, Hamburg, and Wandsbeck. The three bans were printed and circulated in other European Jewish communities. Excerpts from the testimonies were printed by Jacob Emden in his Beth Jonatan haSofer, printed in Altona in 1762. (Note: The full text of the testimonies, letters, and proclamations on the investigation are in Josef Prager's Gahalei Esh, Oxford, Bodleian Library. Ms. 2186, Vol. I, fols. 70r -129).)

Katzenellenbogen was unwilling to attack Eybeschutz publicly, mentioning that "greater than him have fallen and crumbled" and that "there is nothing we can do to him." However, Katzenelenbogen stated that one of the texts found by the Amsterdam beth din, And I Came this Day unto the Fountain, was authored by Eybeschutz and declared that all copies of the work in circulation should be immediately burned. As a result of Eybeschutz and other rabbis in Prague formulating a new and distinct ḥerem against Sabbatianism shortly after the other bans were published, his reputation was restored, and Eybeschutz was regarded as having been vindicated. The issue was to arise again, albeit tangentially, in the 1751 dispute between Emden and Eybeschutz.

He was "an acknowledged genius" in at least three separate areas of Jewish religious creativity: Talmud and halakha; derush (homiletics) and popular preaching; and Kabbalah. "He was a man of erudition, but he owed his fame chiefly to his personality. Few men of the period so profoundly impressed their mark on Jewish life."

== Sabbatian controversy ==
Eybeschutz was again accused of secret Sabbatean beliefs following a suspicion that he had issued amulets recognising the Messianic claims of Sabbatai Zevi. The controversy started when Jacob Emden found connections between the Kabbalistic and homiletic writings of Eybeschutz with those of the Sabbatean Judah Leib Prossnitz, whom Eybeschutz knew from his days in Prossnitz. Emden accused him of heresy. The majority of the rabbis in Poland, Moravia, and Bohemia, as well as the leaders of the Three Communities supported Eybeschutz: the accusation was "utterly incredible"—in 1725, Eybeschutz was among the Prague rabbis who excommunicated the Sabbateans. Others suggest that the rabbis issued this ruling because they feared the repercussions if their leading figure, Eybeschutz, was found to be a Sabbatean. Jacob Emden suggests that the rabbis decided against attacking Eybeschutz out of a reluctance to offend his powerful family and a fear of wealthy supporters living in their communities. The recent discovery of notarial copies of the actual amulets found in Metz and copying the amulets written by Eybeschutz support Emden's view that these are Sabbatean writings.

In 1752, the controversy between Emden and Eybeschutz raged. Clashes between opposing supporters occurred in the streets, drawing the secular authorities' attention. Emden fled. The controversy was heard by both the Senate of Hamburg and by the Royal Court of Denmark. The Hamburg Senate quickly found in favour of Eybeschutz. The King of Denmark asked Eybeschutz to answer questions about the amulets. Conflicting testimony was put forward and the matter remained officially unresolved although the court imposed fines on both parties for civil unrest and ordered that Emden be allowed to return to Altona. At this point, Eybeschutz was defended by Carl Anton, a convert to Christianity, but a former disciple of Eybeschutz. Emden refused to accept the outcome and sent out vicious pamphlets attacking Eybeschutz. Eybeschutz was re-elected as Chief Rabbi. In December of that year, the Hamburg Senate rejected the King's decision and the election result. The Senate of Hamburg started an intricate process to determine the powers of Eybeschutz, and many members of that congregation demanded that he should submit his case to rabbinical authorities.

The controversy was a momentous incident in Jewish history of the era, involving both Yechezkel Landau and the Vilna Gaon. Eybeschutz approached the young Gaon to examine and appraise the amulets. The Gaon replied in a letter that while he had sympathy with Eybeschutz, he did not believe that the words of a young man would assist in the dispute. Some time after the dispute, Landau, a relatively unknown rabbi from Yampil, attempted to resolve the dispute offering both parties a dignified exit. His proposal was accepted by Eybeschutz but vehemently rejected by Emden, who continued to publish attacks on Eybeschutz. Only after Emden's death did the halakhic decision of Landau bring an end to the personal dispute. Some believe that Emden may be credited with having crushed the lingering belief in Sabbatai current even in some Orthodox circles. The notarised copies of all the amulets have recently been rediscovered, demonstrating they are Sabbatean. and the debate of 1725 has been located in the archives.

In 1760, the quarrel broke out once more when some Sabbatean elements were discovered among the students of Eybeschutz' yeshiva. At the same time, his younger son, Wolf Jonas Eybeschutz, presented himself as a Sabbatean prophet and was close to several Frankists, a Sabbatean sect, and the yeshiva was closed.

== Descendants ==
According to Joseph Franz Molitor, the grandson of Eybeschutz and nephew of Jacob Frank, Moses Dobruška, converted to the Catholic Church after inheriting his grandfather's collection of Sabbatean Kabbalistic works. He eventually left the Sabbatean movement, was made a noble under the name Franz Thomas Edler von Schönfeld, and founded a Masonic lodge called the Asiatic Brethren, one of four Illuminati lodges in Vienna. After his uncle's death on August 10, 1791, he was offered the leadership of the Frankist movement, which he refused.

Jacob Katz disputed this claim, saying Schoenfeld was a member of the Dobruška family of Brno and was in no way related, either by blood or marriage, to Eybeschutz. According to Gershom Scholem, the ideology of the Asiatic Brethren mixed Kabbalistic and Sabbatean ideas jumbled together with Christian theosophic doctrines.

Some of Eybeschutz's descendants are the Yiddish novelist and Holocaust survivor Chava Rosenfarb (1916- 2019); prolific author, Holocaust survivor, and noted researcher Yehoshua Eibeshitz (1923–2011), Chaim Kreiswirth (1918-2001) of Antwerp, and Shmuel Wosner (1913–2015), a prominent Haredi rabbi and posek ('decisor of Jewish law') who lived in Bnei Brak. His granddaughter was the Breslau (now Wrocław) poet and intellectual Lucie Domeier (d. 1836), born Esther Gad.

== Works ==
Thirty of his works in the area of Halakha (Jewish law) have been published. In addition, several of his works on homiletics, teaching methodology, and Kabbalah are currently in print. Only one of his works was published in his lifetime. The posthumous printing of so many of his works is testimony to his influence on his contemporaries through his oral teachings and his personality.

- Homiletics (derush) and popular preaching::
  - Ya'arot Devash a frequently quoted collection of the sermons of Eybeschutz.
  - Tiferet Yehonatan on the weekly Torah portion
  - Midrash Yehonatan on the weekly Torah portion
  - Ahavat Yehonatan on the weekly Haftarah
  - Shirei Mitzvot, the 613 commandments in rhymed acrostics.
  - Notes on the Passover Haggadah, as well as Perush al Piska Had Gadya on the poem Had Gadya
- On Talmud and halakhah::
  - Chasdei Yehonatan, Pilpulim on assorted Sugyas of Talmud and halakhah.
  - Novellae to Shulchan Aruch: Urim ve-Tummim on Choshen Mishpat; Kereti u-Peleti on Yoreh De'ah; Sar ha-Alef on Orach Chayim.
  - Notes on Maimonides' Mishneh Torah: Binah la-Ittim and Chiddushim al Hilkot Yom Tov both dealing with the holy days, and both published by his students, based on notes taken from his lectures; Bene Ahuvah on the matrimonial laws.
  - Tiferet Yisrael, notes on the rabbinical laws of niddah (regarding menstruation), with additions by the editor, his grandson Israel.
  - Matuk MidVash, notes on the rabbinical laws of shabbos.
- On Kabbalah::
  - Shem Olam, a collection of letters on the Kabbalah

Eybeschutz also wrote Luchoth Edut (Tablets of Testimony), in which he describes the whole dispute and attempts to refute the charges against him. It includes also the letters of recommendation which he had received from leading rabbis who came to his defense. In January 2014, Maggid Books, a division of Koren Publishers Jerusalem published "Derash Yehonatan: Around the Year with Yehonatan Eybeshitz" by Rabbi Shalom Hammer. This work is one of the first English translations of Eybeshütz's writings. In 2023, Three Steps Forward was published by Rabbi Menachem Tenenbaum, a descendant of Eybeschutz. The book is an english commentary on Ya’aros Devash.

Book commonly agreed by modern scholars (P. Maciejko, Y. Liebes) to be ascribed to Rabbi Eybeschutz is "Va-avo ha-Yom el ha-Ayyin", "And I Came this Day unto the Fountain", which is both related to Kabbalah and Sabbataism.

See: Yehudah Liebes "Sod ha-Emunah ha-Shabbeta'it", Jerusalem 1995, p. 344 n. 85. Moshe Aryeh Perlmuter "Rabbi Yehonatan Aybeshits ve-Yahaso el ha-Shabbeta'ut", Jerusalem 1947, pp. 131-146. Paweł Maciejko "Coitus interruptus in 'And I Came this Day unto the Fountain'", p. xvii [in:] Introduction to: Jonathan Eibeschütz, And I Came this Day unto the Fountain, ואבוא היום אל העין, Critically Edited and Introduced by Paweł Maciejko, With Additional Studies by Noam Lefler, Jonatan Benarroch and Shai Alleson Gerberg, 2014 (Sources and Studies in the Literature of Jewish Mysticism 42), 360 pp., ISBN 1-933379-45-6.

== Sources ==
- Moshe Perlmutter, R.Yehonatan Aibeshits ve-yahaso el ha-Shabtaut : hakirot hadashot 'al yesod ketav ha-yad shel s.va-avo ha-yom el ha-'ayin (Tel Aviv:1947 )
- Carl Anton, Period documents concerning the Emden/Eibeschuetz controversy. (Reprint 1992)
- Elisheva Carlebach, The pursuit of heresy : Rabbi Moses Hagiz and the Sabbatian controversies (Columbia 1990)
- Gershom Scholem, Meḥḳere Shabtaʼut (1991)
- Sid Leiman/Simon Schwarzfuchs, New Evidence on the Emden-Eibeschiitz Controversy. The Amulets from Metz, Revue des Etudes Juives 165 (2006),
- Sid Z. Leiman, "When a Rabbi Is Accused of Heresy: R. Ezekiel Landau's Attitude toward R. Jonathan Eibeschuetz in the Emden- Eibeschuetz Controversy in FROM ANCIENT ISRAEL TO MODERN JUDAISM Edited by Jacob Neusner
- Leiman, Sid (Shnayer) Z. When a rabbi is accused of heresy : the stance of the Gaon of Vilna in the Emden-Eibeschuetz controversy in Me'ah She'arim (2001) 251-263
- Leiman, Sid (Shnayer) Z. When a rabbi is accused of heresy : the stance of Jacob Joshua Falk in the Emden-Eibeschuetz controversy. Rabbinic Culture and Its Critics (2008) 435-456
- Moshe Carmilly-Weinberger, Wolf Jonas Eybeschutz - an "Enlightened" Sabbatean in Transylvania Studia Judaica, 6 (1997) 7-26
- Yehuda Liebes "A Messianic Treatise by R. Wolf the son of R. Jonathan Eibeschutz." Qiryat Sefer 57 (1982/2)148-178.
