= Ephraim Joseph Hirschfeld =

- Born: Ephraim Joseph Hirschel; Karlsruhe, Margraviate of Baden-Durlach, Holy Roman Empire
- Died: January 27, 1820; Offenbach am Main, German Confederation

Ephraim Joseph Hirschfeld, born Ephraim Joseph Hirschel (c. 1758, Karlsruhe - January 27, 1820, Offenbach am Main), was a German-Jewish mystic of the Enlightenment and an active Freemason. He tried to create a religious fusion of Judaism and Christianity within a kabbalistic framework and was close to leading Frankists.

== Biography ==
Ephraim Joseph Hirschfeld was born to Joseph Hirschel Darmstadt, a cantor educated in the Talmud, and his wife, Rachel Hirschl, and was originally named Ephraim Joseph Hirschel. With the support of Johann Georg Schlosser, Goethe's brother-in-law, he attended grammar school in Karlsruhe from 1773 and then the University of Strasbourg to study medicine, but did not complete his studies. He was fluent in French, Latin, and German and had a broad general education.

Between 1779 and 1781, Hirschfeld (then still known as Hirschel) lived in Berlin, where, through Schlosser's mediation, he worked as an accountant and tutor for David Friedländer and maintained close contacts with Moses Mendelssohn and the circle of the Haskalah. In 1782, he moved to Innsbruck, where he worked as an accountant for Gabriel Uffenheimer, the Jewish owner of the Tyrolean salt warehouse. Prompted by the founder of the Masonic-Rosicrucean Order of Knights and Brothers of Light (also known as the Asiatic Brethren), Baron Hans Heinrich Ecker und Eckhoffen, who opened his masonic lodge to the Jews, he moved to Vienna, where his brother Pascal later moved from Maastricht. There, both brothers dropped their previous name Hirschel, called themselves Hirschfeld from then on, and worked for the order.

After the Asiatic Brethren were banned in Vienna in 1785, Ecker and Ephraim Joseph Hirschfeld moved to Schleswig with the support of Prince Charles of Hesse-Kassel, a committed Freemason, where there was also a group of Asiatic Brethren. In 1790, Hirschfeld got into legal trouble due to disputes with Ecker and was placed under house arrest, from which he was freed in 1792 by Franz Thomas von Schönfeld (born Moses Dobruška or Dobruschka), with whom he had joined the Asiatic Brethren, through the payment of 550 talers.

Hirschfeld followed Schönfeld on his way to Paris, where he participated in the French Revolution and was later guillotined, as far as Strasbourg, but then Hirschfeld went to Frankfurt am Main and Offenbach, where he lived from 1792 until his death. He maintained contact with the Offenbach court of the Frankists, with the "Christian Kabbalist" Joseph Franz Molitor, and with the Freemasons.
