= Isaac Seckel Etthausen =

German rabbi

Isaac Seckel ben Menahem Etthausen (Hebrew: יצחק זעקל בן מנחם עטהויזן; fl. early 18th century) was a German rabbi, who served as a rabbi in various towns for a period spanning fifty-five years. He was the author of Or ne'elam, a collection of fifty-eight responsa relating to subjects he had discussed with Baruch Rapoport, Jonathan Eybeschütz, and others; and Ur lo be-Ẓiyyon, novellæ on Berakhot and Halakot Ḳeṭannot. Both works were published after his death by his son, Judah Löb Etthausen (Carlsruhe, 1765).
