= Asiatic Brethren =

German masonic organization (1780–1785)

Asiatic Brethren (German: Asiatische Brüder) is the short name for a Masonic high degree system developed in 1782 by Hans Heinrich von Ecker und Eckhoffen and spread by him and his brother Hans Karl, particularly in the Austrian hereditary lands, but also in northern Germany. Its full name is Order of Knights and Brothers of St. John the Evangelist from Asia in Europe. The history of the order is part of the emancipation of Jews in German-speaking Freemasonry, because it was one of the first such order, where Jews could become members. The order blended esoteric systems such as Rosicrucianism with influences from Freemasonry, Frankism, Martinism, Alchemy and Jewish Kabbalah.

== History ==
Hans Heinrich von Ecker lived in Vienna, capital of the Habsburg Monarchy, where he came into contact with Jewish Kabbalists. He was also a member of the Order of the Golden and Rosy Cross. In 1780 or 1781, he founded the Order of Light, which was renamed the Asiatic Brethren shortly thereafter. As early as 1781, Hans Heinrich von Ecker, as Deputy Master of the Chair of the Masonic Lodge Zu den sieben Himmeln (To the Seven Heavens) in Vienna, promoted his new secret society, supposedly established by the "seven wise fathers, leaders of the seven churches in Asia," with the purpose of "spreading light and truth, bestowing bliss and peace, and unlocking the true secret images of the three degrees of the Brothers of the Masonic Knights."

The system had five degrees (knight novice of the 3rd, 5th, and 7th years, Levite, and priest). By incorporating and emphasizing Kabbalistic elements in the ritual, the admission of Jews as "ancient true brothers from Asia" was to be made possible, who at that time had no access to German Freemasonry and Rosicrucianism. In accordance with the "seven churches," the order consisted of six provincial chapters and one main chapter. Ecker was the order's chancellor. Due to disputes with the Rosicrucians and financial entanglements, he left Vienna and then promoted his "teaching method" in Berlin, but the order was abolished by the king.

Ecker appeared at the Wilhelmsbad Masonic Convention in 1782, where he won over Landgrave Charles of Hesse-Kassel (a high level Mason and member of the Illuminati) for his project. At the latter's request, he revised the system. This led to the creation of the Knights and Brothers of St. John the Evangelist from Asia in Europe, the Asiatic Brethren. Jews, brothers of the so-called "Melchizedek Lodges," were still admitted, but blasphemers and high treasoners, i.e., those who "in the slightest way violate the sacred rights of kings and princes, who are the image of the Eternal on earth," were denied entry. The Order again had five divisions, two probationary stages: Seekers and Sufferers, and three main stages: Knights and Brothers, Wise Masters, and Royal Priests or True Rosicrucians (the latter also called Melchizedek Elus).

A Count Sinzendorf was Grand Master, Prince Karl von Liechtenstein was Protector of the Order. In his writing Abfertigung an den ungenannten Verfasser der verbreiteten sogenannten Authentischen Nachricht von den Ritter- und Brüder-Eingeweihten aus Asien (Hamburg 1788, p. 12), Ecker names the Marburg professor of mathematics and philosophy Johann Konrad Spangenberg (1711-1783) as an active member of the order. Other members included the army supplier and Jacobin Moses Dobruška (a relative of Jacob Frank), who ended up on the guillotine in Paris after participating in the French Revolution, the Prussian court factor Isaak Daniel Itzig, and the Kabbalist Ephraim Joseph Hirschfeld, who was also connected to Frankism. Later, Duke Ferdinand of Brunswick and Charles of Hesse-Kassel held the title of Grand Master of the Order.

== Doctrine ==
The Internationales Freimaurer-Lexikon describes the organization of the Order as an imitation of the Rosicrucians. Basically, the Asiatic Brothers were "nothing more than a splinter group of the Rosicrucians, in which the ecclesiastical and even Christian elements had been almost completely eliminated." The content of the teachings was intended to reveal the "true secrets and moral and physical insights of the hieroglyphs of the Order of Knights and Brothers Freemasons." The numerical symbolism of Martinism was combined with Kabbalistic elements of the Rosicrucians. At the two highest levels of the order, spirit summoning was practiced.

== End of the Order ==
The order in Austria came to an end with the measures restricting Freemasonry introduced by Joseph II in 1785. The struggle of Ignaz von Born and Prince Karl Johann Baptist, Prince of Dietrichstein against the Asiatic Brethren contributed significantly to the enactment of the so-called Freemasonry Patent, even though the order's lists included the names of many noble families.

After the Asiatic Brethren were banned in Vienna in 1785, Ecker and Ephraim Joseph Hirschfeld moved to Schleswig with the support of Landgrave Charles, where there was also a group of Asiatic Brethren. In 1790, Hirschfeld got into legal trouble due to disputes with Ecker and was placed under house arrest, from which he was freed in 1792 by Franz Thomas von Schönfeld (born Moses Dobruška), with whom he had joined the Asiatic Brethren, through the payment of 550 talers. In northern Germany (and probably also in Scandinavia), the order seems to have lasted longer than in Austria.

Albert Pike, prominent American Mason and American Civil War general, associated the Asiatic Brethren with Illuminati-related Enlightenment societies. In his 1883 work, "A Historical Inquiry In Regard To The Grand Constitutions Of 1786", he stated that the disbanded Illuminati continued on through the various branches of the Rosicrucian Order, including the later versions of the Order of the Golden and Rosy Cross, the Order of Saint Joachim and the Asiatic Brethren.
