= Mieses =

Mieses is a surname. Notable people with the surname include:

- Abraham Mieses, Dominican Republic boxer
- Fabius Mieses (1824–1898), writer, poet, and philosopher
- Jacques Mieses (1865–1954), German-born English chess Grandmaster and writer
- Johan Mieses (born 1995), Dominican baseball player
- Józef Mieses (1892–1942), Polish teacher, linguist, rabbi and military officer
- Samuel Mieses (1841–1884), German chess master
