= Moses Dobruška =

Czech writer (1753–1794)

Moses Dobruška or Moses Dobruschka, alias Junius Frey (12 July 1753, Brno, Moravia – 5 April 1794) was a writer, poet and revolutionary. His mother was the first cousin of Jacob Frank, who claimed to be the Jewish messiah and founded the Frankist sect. On 17 December 1775 he converted from Judaism to the Catholic faith and took the name of Franz Thomas Schönfeld. On 25 July 1778 he was elevated to nobility in Vienna, becoming Franz Thomas Edler von Schönfeld. Together with Ephraim Joseph Hirschfeld, who did not convert, he became one of the main activists of the masonic lodge of the “Knights of St. John the Evangelists for Asia in Europe,” active in Germany and Austria between 1783 and 1790, which was the first German-speaking masonic order to accept Jews.

In 1792, in the wake of the French Revolution, he traveled via Strasbourg to Paris and became a Jacobin, changing his name, once again, to Junius Frey. The new name derived from Junius from the Roman Junii family that fostered the famous tyrant slayer Brutus, and Frey being a transliteration of the German word for "liberty". In June 1793 he published his book Philosophie sociale, dédiée au peuple françois. He was arrested for treason and espionage and executed by guillotine on 5 April 1794 in connection with the case against his brother-in-law François Chabot.

Title page of *Sefer HaSha'ashu'a* (Book of Delight), a commentary on *Sefer Bechinat Olam* (Book of the Examination of the World) by Jedaiah Bedersi (HaPenini), by Moses Dobruška, 1775.

== Life ==
=== As Moses Dobruška ===
Moses Dobruška was the second of twelve children born to Salomon Dobruška (1715–1774) and Schöndl (Katharina) Dobruška, née Hirschel (1731–1791). His father was a wealthy Jewish merchant and army supplier. He had taken over the lease of the imperial and royal tobacco monopoly from his father, Jacob Moyses Wertheimer or Wimer, who was born in Dobruška and died in 1764, and thus held a monopoly on the tobacco trade in all towns in Moravia. Salomon Dobruška ran a small synagogue in his house. Moses' mother was a cousin of Jacob Joseph Frank. She was friends with Wolf Benjamin Eibeschütz and a follower and leading proponent of Sabbatianism, a messianic movement in Judaism dating back to Sabbatai Zevi. Opponents from traditional rabbinical Jewish circles, such as Jacob Emden, were strongly opposed to this movement.

Moses' father wanted his son Moses to become a learned rabbi and had him taught in the Talmud accordingly. Moses learned Yiddish, the everyday language of Ashkenazi Jews, as well as Hebrew. His tutor also taught him Hebrew poetry and rhetoric, as well as Oriental languages. This sparked his interest in humanism. His father finally agreed to replace his Talmud lessons with the study of European languages, including German, English, French, and Italian. Moses soon tried his hand at German poetry and published Etliche Gedichte zur Probe (Several Poems for Trial) in 1773. Although this first work by the twenty-year-old received a rather negative review by Johann Erich Biester, it nevertheless brought Dobruška into contact with German literary figures.

On May 20, 1773, he married Elke Joß (~1757–1801), the adopted daughter of the wealthy merchant and banker Joachim Popper, and moved with her to Prague and later to Vienna, where he worked as a military supplier for the Austrian army in the Balkans. In the following years, a series of publications of various literary genres appeared from the pen of Moses Dobruška, some in German and some in Hebrew. In addition to shepherd poetry, he also published Sefer ha-sha‘ashu‘a (Book of Pleasure), a scholarly commentary on the didactic poem Bechinat olam (Examination of the World) by the medieval Jewish poet Jedaja Bedersi, in which he quoted extensively from rabbinical literature as well as Jewish Enlightenment thinkers, especially Moses Mendelsohn.

Dobruška's worldview was strongly influenced by his uncle Jakob Frank. Frank saw himself as the Messiah who would free the Jews from the legalism of the Talmud and oppression in Christian society. His Kabbalistic teachings are known as Frankism. Frank had himself baptized in 1759, along with about three thousand of his followers, but on the condition that his community be allowed to retain its special customs and teachings. Conversion to the Roman Catholic Church enabled him to acquire land in Poland-Lithuania and guaranteed the Frankists protection from their opponents among Jewish Orthodoxy. Frank propagated baptism as a necessary part of the path to salvation, which required the Messiah and his followers to descend into the depths of sin before final redemption. He later migrated to Bohemia, after being accused of Heresy in Poland.

=== As Franz Thomas Edler von Schönfeld ===
Under Frank's influence, Dobruška publicly converted to Catholicism in Prague on December 17, 1775, and was baptized together with his wife and young daughter in St. Vitus Cathedral. He took the name Franz Thomas Schönfeld. His wife took the name Wilhelmine. Almost all of his other siblings also converted to Catholicism between 1775 and 1791. As an officer, Karl Schönfeld paved the way for his siblings to enter imperial service and thus achieve social advancement.

On July 25, 1778, Franz Thomas Schönfeld was elevated to hereditary nobility in Vienna, together with his siblings employed in the military, Karl Schönfeld, imperial lieutenant, and Joseph Schönfeld, ensign, as well as his other siblings, Maximilian, Leopold, and Emanuel Schönfeld. The nobility diploma reveals that Moses Dobruški, alias Franz Thomas Edler von Schönfeld, was co-director of the famous Garell Library, which was headed by Michael Denis at the time. His duties also included censoring books. He was highly favored by Maria Theresa and Joseph II, to whom he dedicated several of his writings published during those years. As early as 1778, his biography appeared in Ignaz de Lucas's Das gelehrte Oesterreich.

Together with Ephraim Joseph Hirschfeld, who did not convert, von Schönfeld joined the Order of Knights and Brothers of St. John the Evangelist from Asia in Europe (also known as the Asiatic Brethren), a society of Freemasons. It was one of the first Masonic lodges on German soil to accept Jews. In terms of content, it combined Jewish Kabbalistic and other mystical ideas. Schönfeld translated Kabbalistic texts from the Sabbatean circle into German for this lodge. However, he withdrew from the order even before Joseph II banned Freemasonry in 1785, but remained in contact with Hirschfeld until he moved to Paris in 1792. Schönfeld also joined the Order of the Illuminati.

According to an anonymous accusation brought against the Frankists in 1799, Schönfeld was offered leadership of the sect after the death of its religious leader in 1791. Contemporary Georg Forster even reported that the Frankists believed that Frank's soul would reincarnate in his nephew 49 days after his death, in the manner of “Tibetan transmigration.” However, Schönfeld did not take up this position, although it is unclear whether he refused it himself or whether he was unable to prevail against Frank's daughter Eva Frank and her followers. Frank had already been out of favor of the Habsburgs several years before his death. In 1786, he had left Brno and spent the last years of his life with his closest followers in relative isolation and with growing debts at Isenburg Castle. At the end of his life, he interpreted the French Revolution as the dawn of the end times, which would bring the Jews to the Promised Land and make them victorious over their enemies.

Not long after Frank's death, von Schönfeld accompanied Emperor Leopold II to the Pillnitz Assembly of Princes, where the emperor and the Prussian king Frederick William II, at the urging of French émigrés, issued the Pillnitz Declaration, which declared the restoration of the monarchy in France to be its goal. Schönfeld did not return to Vienna from this trip, but went to Berlin and from there to Hamburg. Leopold II died unexpectedly on March 1, 1792, shortly after returning to Vienna. His successor, Franz II, turned away from the liberal policies of his predecessors and did not pay their debts, which the imperial house owed to the Schönfeld brothers.

=== As Junius Frey ===
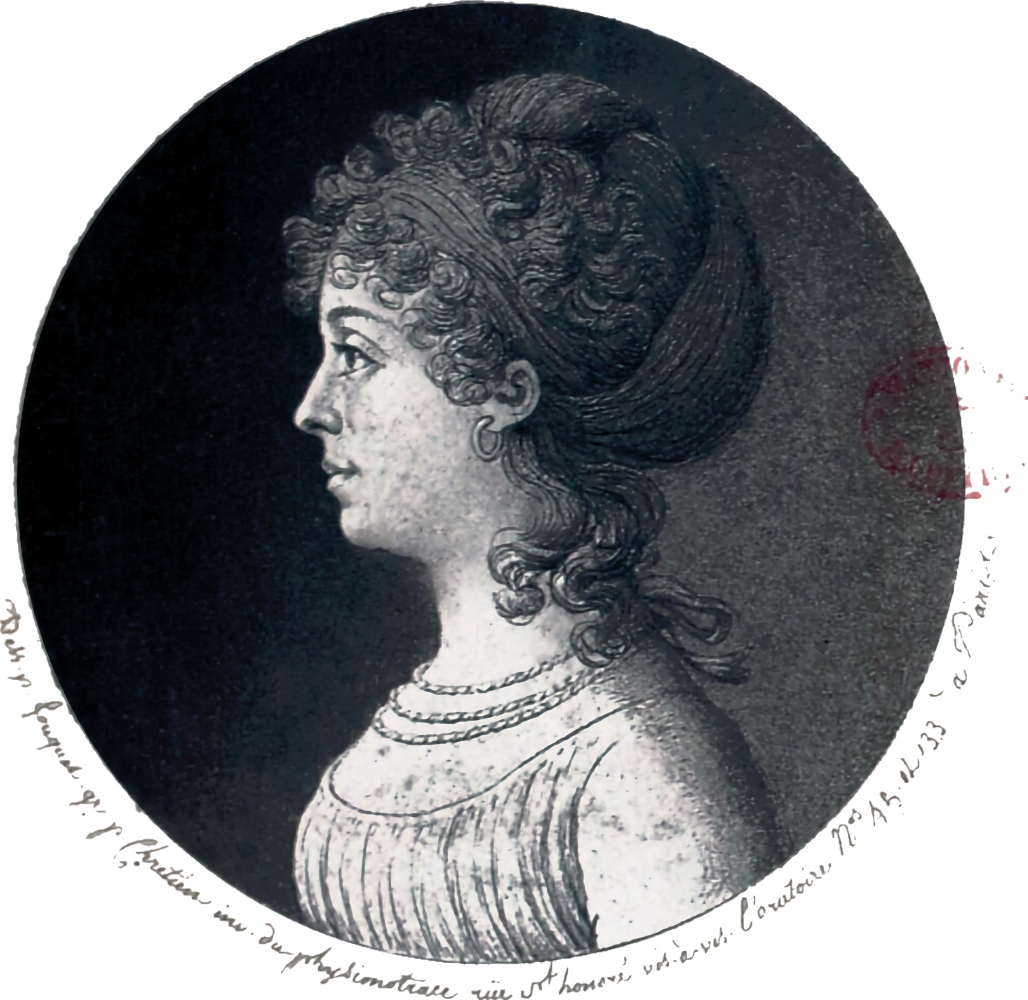
Portrait of his sister Leopoldine

In March 1792, Schönfeld traveled to Strasbourg with his brother Emanuel (* 1765) and his son Joseph Franz. There he appeared under the name Sigmund Gottlob Junius Brutus Frey or Lucien-Junius Frey. He chose this name, which concealed both his Jewish origins and his connection to the Austrian aristocracy, after Lucius Iunius Brutus, who had liberated Rome from the tyranny of the kings and thus established the Roman Republic. He passed off his thirteen-year-old son as his sixteen-year-old nephew and had him enlist in the French army. In Strasbourg, he supported the Jacobin Jean-Charles Laveaux and accompanied him to Paris in June of the same year.

On August 10, 1792, the Frey brothers took part in the storming of the Tuileries. Junius Frey was also a member of the Jacobin dechristianization committee. Both brothers also provided financial support for the revolution and applied for French citizenship. Parallel to his literary and political activities, Junius Frey invested a considerable fortune in building up the family business. It is not clear where this money came from. His later claim that his wife had sent it to him seems implausible, as Wilhelmine Schönfeld had been disinherited by her adoptive father and the house she lived in with her two daughters in Vienna was auctioned off during his stay in Paris due to the high unpaid debts Schönfeld had left behind.

Nevertheless, he rented an apartment in a prime location in Paris, which became a meeting place for Jacobins and Germans enthusiastic about the revolution, and bought the dissolved Chelles Abbey and two estates belonging to fugitive nobles, which were auctioned off in favor of the revolution. He had his youngest sister Leopoldine (* 1771), whom he had brought to Paris after their mother's death, married in October 1793 to François Chabot, whom he promised monthly support and a large dowry, which, however, was not to be paid out for five years.

In connection with the trial against Danton, Junius Frey was denounced by his co-defendant brother-in-law Chabot. Junius Frey, his brother Emanuel Frey, and his sister, who had been married for only a few weeks, were arrested on November 23, 1793. Leopoldine Chabot was released after a short time at her husband's request. During the trial, the Frey brothers were accused of being “foreign ex-aristocrats, ex-barons, ... agents of England and the Viennese cabinet.” Frey defended himself by saying that the money he had received from Vienna came from his wife and not from the Austrian government. He stated that, due to his revolutionary views, he had been forced to flee, leaving behind his entire fortune, which was eventually confiscated, and that the emperor still owed him 500,000 florins. Ultimately, they were convicted, along with Danton and Chabot, of participating in a conspiracy to restore the monarchy, and were executed by guillotine.

After Frey's death, his widow tried again to get hold of her adoptive father's inheritance. She died in 1801. Both daughters married Austrian nobles. Leopoldine Chabot was left completely destitute after the death of her brothers and her husband. What became of her is unknown. According to one source, she returned to Vienna, while another claims she died in Paris in 1795.

== Works ==
as Moses Dobruška:

- Etliche Gedichte zur Probe, Vienna 1773;
- Schäferspiele, Prague 1774;
- Theorie der schönen Wissenschaften, Prague 1774;
- Ueber die Poesie der alten Hebräer under the title: Sefer hascha-hua, Prague 1774;
- Ein Schäfergedicht in eben dieser Sprache;
- Eine hebräische poetische Uebersetzung des Pythagoras goldener Sprüche, Prague 1775;
- Gebet oder christliche Ode in Psalmen, Vienna 1775.

as Franz Thomas von Schönfeld

- David (in Almanach und Taschenbuch zum geselligen Vergnügen 1799)

as Junius Frey (published anonymous):

- Philosophie sociale, Paris 1793 (in German);
- Les aventures politiques du père Nicaise, ou l’Anti-fédéraliste, Paris 1793;
- Die Weihe (unpublished manuscript)
