= Harris Lenowitz =

Harris Lenowitz is a professor of languages and literature at the University of Utah. He specializes in Hebraic studies, particularly the writings of the 18th-century Jewish messiah claimant Jacob Frank and the use of Hebrew in Christian art in the West.

== Education and career ==
In 1966 Lenowitz received his B.A. in English from the University of Texas at Austin. He received his Ph.D. in Linguistics in 1971, also from the University of Texas at Austin. He remained at the university as a lecturer in 1971–1972. In 1972, he joined the faculty of the University of Utah as an assistant professor. He became an associate professor in 1976 and a full professor in 1989. Lenowitz has been a visiting professor at Hebrew University from 1980–1981; at Portland State University in the summers of 1976, 1980 and 1984; at the University of Washington in the summer of 1987; and at the University of Haifa from 1995–1996. He received the PEN International Center Prize in Translation in 1978.

== Works ==
Lenowitz edited, translated and annotated The Collection of the Words of the Lord, a work originally written in Polish by Jacob Frank; the translation is freely available online. He has also translated The Sayings of the Lord Yakov Frank. In addition, he is the author of The Jewish Messiahs: From the Galilee to Crown Heights, which was reviewed in the Fort Worth Star-Telegram and several scholarly journals. The Jewish Messiahs was described in the Jewish Quarterly Review as "the first text in English that focuses on primary texts relating to messianism as an active force in Jewish history" and in the Sixteenth-Century Journal as "a different and thought-provoking context to messianism and the context of messiah." Other works include seven additional volumes, approximately 20 scholarly articles, and 10 book chapters.

== Lawsuit ==
Lenowitz formerly belonged to the governing committee of the University of Utah's Middle East Center, one of only a handful of such centers in the United States. Robert Newman, then the University of Utah's dean of humanities, removed him from the governing committee, and in 2009 Lenowitz filed a lawsuit against Newman, claiming that Newman unfairly accused him of contributing to a hostile environment that had driven away several female faculty members. Lenowitz had previously denied Newman's claims, saying that the female faculty members had departed for better-paying jobs at other schools. The lawsuit has been dismissed.

Lenowitz was set to retire in the summer of 2011.

== See also ==
- Sabbatai Zevi
- Gershom Scholem
- Frankism
