= Jacob Frank =

Polish-Jewish religious leader (1726–1790)

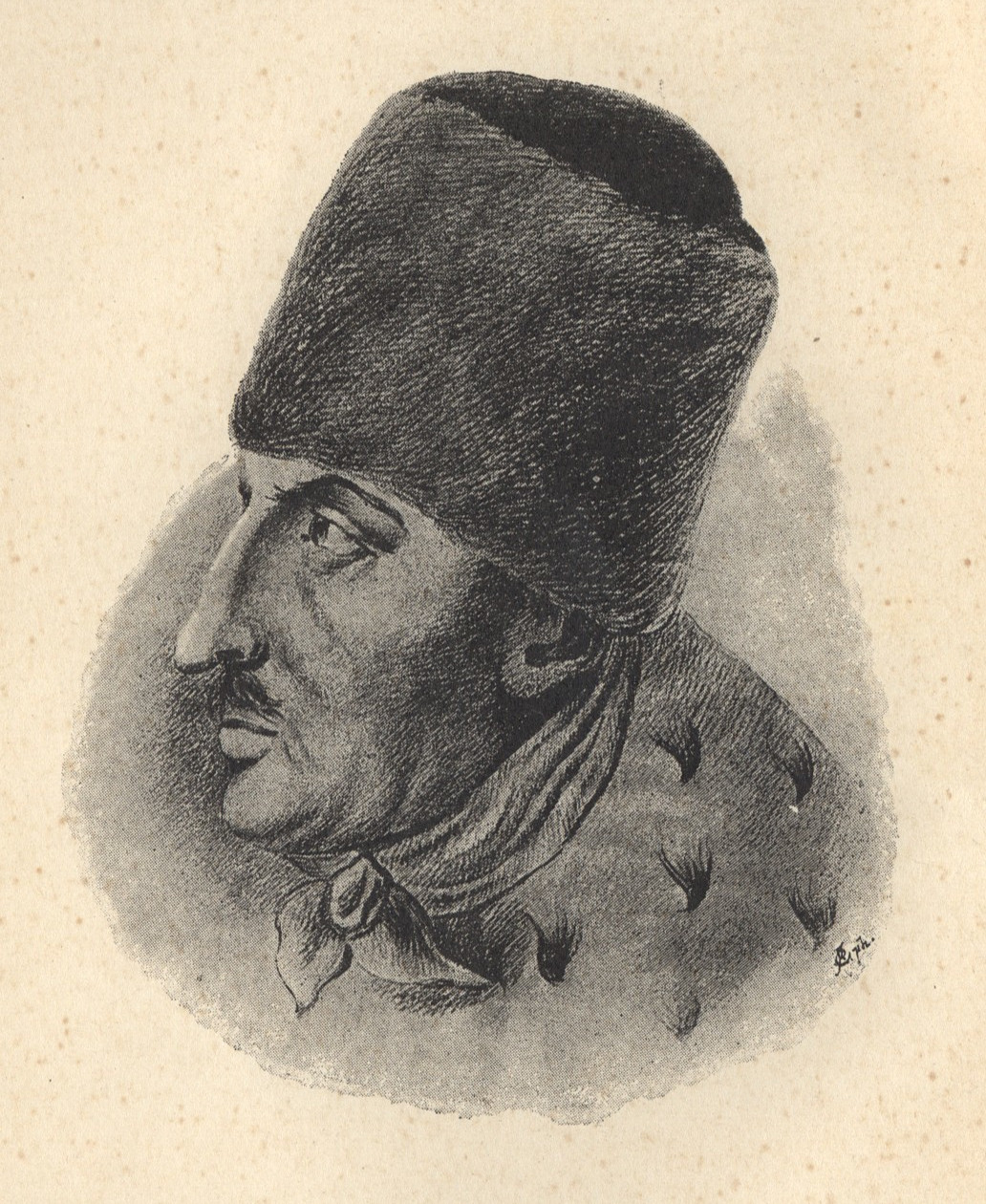
- Jacob Frank, 1895 depiction

Personal life
- Born: Jakub Lejbowicz; 1726 Korolówka, Polish-Lithuanian Commonwealth
- Died: December 10, 1791 (aged 64–65) Offenbach am Main, Principality of Isenburg-Birstein, Holy Roman Empire
- Children: Eve Frank

Religious life
- Religion: Judaism

Jewish leader
- Organisation: Frankism

Jacob Joseph Frank (Hebrew: יעקב פרנק; Yiddish: יעקבֿ פֿראַנק; Polish: Jakub Józef Frank; born Jakub Lejbowicz; 1726 – 10 December 1791) was a Polish-Jewish religious leader who claimed to be the reincarnation of the self-proclaimed messiah Sabbatai Zevi (1626–1676) and also of the biblical patriarch Jacob. The religious authorities of the Jewish community excommunicated Frank and his followers due to his heretical doctrines that included deification of himself as a part of a trinity and other controversial concepts such as neo-Carpocratian "purification through transgression". Frank’s teachings led his sect into scandalous practices, including ritualized orgies, incestuous acts—most notably between fathers and daughters—and the deliberate violation of Jewish moral laws, which he preached were necessary to hasten a messianic redemption through embracing the "abyss" of sin.

Frank arguably created a religious movement, now referred to as Frankism, which incorporated aspects of Christianity and Judaism. His followers, known as Frankists, engaged in sexually promiscuous rites, such as the infamous 1756 incident in Lanckoroń, Podolia (now Zarichanka, Khmelnytskyi Oblast, Ukraine), during which they were allegedly caught dancing around a half-naked woman symbolizing the Shechinah. Historical evidence indicates that Jacob Frank outwardly converted to Islam around 1757 while in the Ottoman Empire.

Later, Frankists were encouraged to convert in mass to Catholicism. The development of Frankism was one of the consequences of the messianic movement of Sabbatai Zevi. This religious mysticism followed socioeconomic changes among the Jews of Poland, Lithuania and Ruthenia.

== Historical background ==
There were numerous outbreaks of followers of Sabbatai Zevi in Eastern Poland (now Ukraine), particularly in Podolia and Galicia, between the late 17th and the early 18th century.

In expectation of the great Messianic revolution, the members of these societies violated Jewish laws and customs. The mystical cult of the Sabbateans is believed to have included both asceticism and sensuality: some did penance for their sins, subjected themselves to self-inflicted pain, and "mourned for Zion"; others disregarded the strict rules of modesty required by Judaism, and at times were accused of being licentious, or even committing ritual incest. The Polish rabbis attempted to place the "Sabbatean heresy" in herem at the assembly at Lwów (now Lviv in Ukraine) in 1722. Still, they could not fully succeed, as it was widely popular among the nascent Jewish middle class.

== Early life ==
Jacob Frank is believed to have been born as Jakub Lejbowicz (Yankev Leybovitsh) to a Jewish family in Korołówka, in Podolia of Eastern Poland (now in Ukraine), in about 1726. Though Polish historian Gaudenty Pikulski states that Frank was born in Buchach and Shmuel Yosef Agnon claimed to even show the house where he was born on Korołówka street in Buchach. His father was a Sabbatean, and moved to Czernowitz, in the Carpathian region of Bukovina, in 1730, where the Sabbatean influence at the time was strong.

As a travelling merchant in textiles and precious stones, Jacob Frank often visited Ottoman territories, where he earned the nickname "Frank", a name generally given in the East to Europeans, and lived in the centers of contemporary Sabbateanism, Salonica and Smyrna.

In the early 1750s, Frank became intimate with the leaders of the Sabbateans. Two followers of the Sabbatian leader Osman Baba (b. 1720) were witnesses at his wedding in 1752. In 1755, he reappeared in Podolia, gathered a group of local adherents, and began to preach the "revelations" which were communicated to him by the Dönmeh in Salonica. One of these gatherings in Lanckoroń/Zarichanka ended in a scandal, and the rabbis' attention was drawn to the new teachings. Frank was forced to leave Podolia, while his followers were hounded and denounced to the local authorities by the rabbis (1756). At the rabbinical court held in the village of Satanów (today Sataniv in Ukraine) the Sabbateans were accused of having broken fundamental Jewish laws of morality and modesty.

== Declaration of being a successor to Sabbatai Zevi ==
At this critical moment Jacob Frank came to Iwania, proclaimed himself as a direct successor to Sabbatai Zevi and Otman Baba, and assured his adherents that he had received revelations from Heaven. These revelations called for the conversion of Frank and his followers to the Christian religion, which was to be a visible transition stage to the future "das" or religion to be revealed by Frank. In 1759 negotiations looking toward the conversion of the Frankists to Roman Catholicism were being actively carried on with the higher representatives of the Polish Church; at the same time the Frankists tried to secure another discussion with the rabbis. The Polish primate Łubieński and the papal nuncio Nicholas Serra were suspicious of the aspirations of the Frankists, but at the insistence of the administrator of the bishopric of Lwów, the canon Mikulski, the discussion was arranged. It was held in Lwów and was presided over by Mikulski. Protestant missionaries also tried to detour the Frankists to Protestantism, and a handful did join the Moravian Church.

== Baptism of the Frankists ==
At the discussion in 1759, the rabbis energetically repulsed their opponents. After the discussion the Frankists were requested to demonstrate in practice their adherence to Christianity; Jacob Frank, who had then arrived in Lwów, encouraged his followers to take the decisive step. The baptism of the Frankists was celebrated with great solemnity in the churches of Lwów, with members of the Polish szlachta (nobility) acting as god-parents. The neophytes adopted the names of their godfathers and godmothers, and ultimately joined their ranks. Frank himself was baptized in Lwów (17 September 1759) and again in Warsaw the next day, with King Augustus III as his godfather. Frank's baptismal name was "Joseph" (Józef). In the course of one year more than 500 individuals were converted to Christianity at Lwów, and nearly a thousand in the following year. By 1790, 26,000 Jews were recorded baptised in Poland.

However, the Frankists continued to be viewed with suspicion due to their strange doctrines. Frank was arrested in Warsaw on 6 February 1760 and delivered to the Church's tribunal on the charge of heresy. He was convicted of teaching heresy, and imprisoned in the monastery of Częstochowa.

== Prison and later days ==
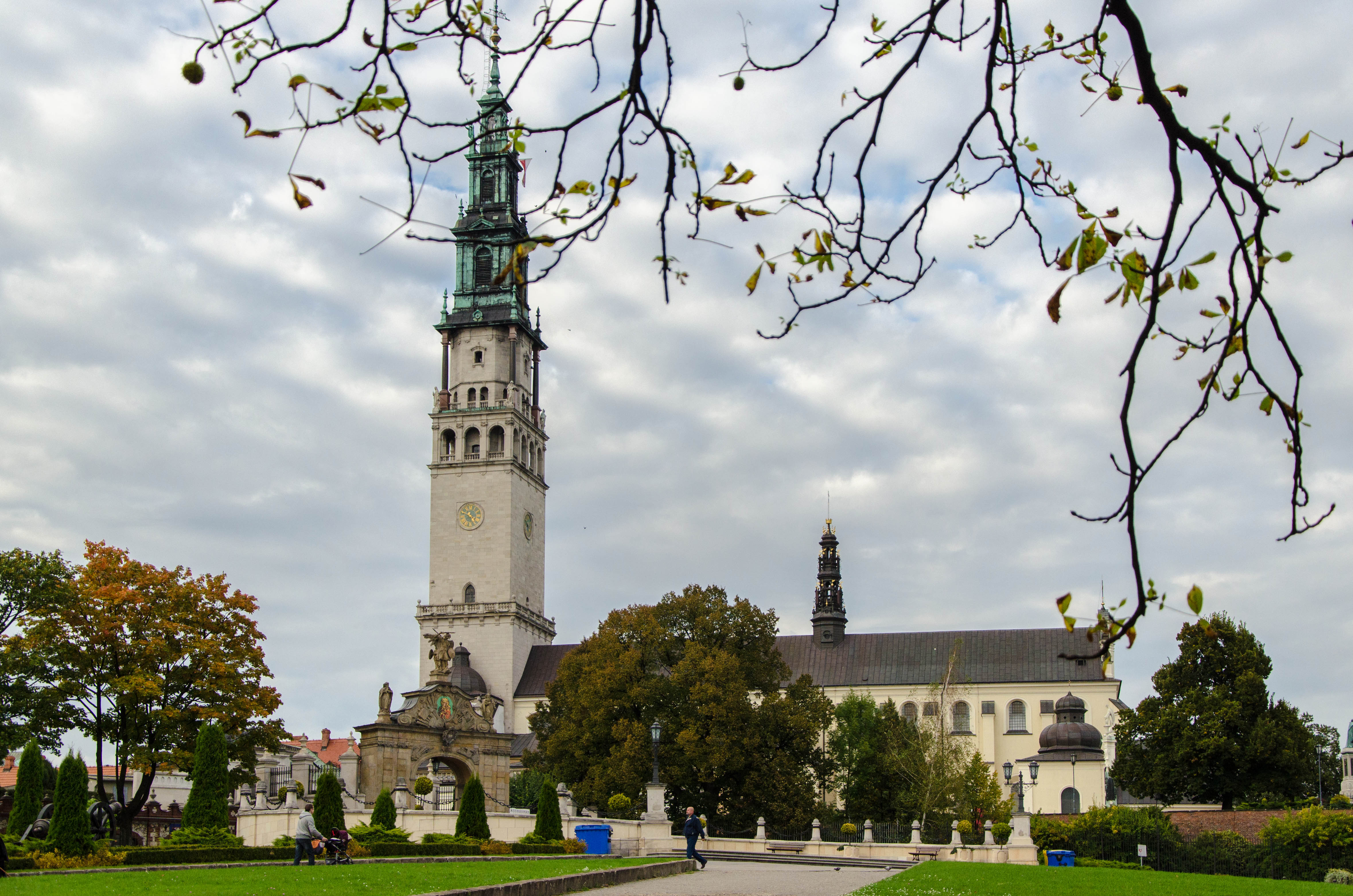
Jasna Góra Monastery in Częstochowa

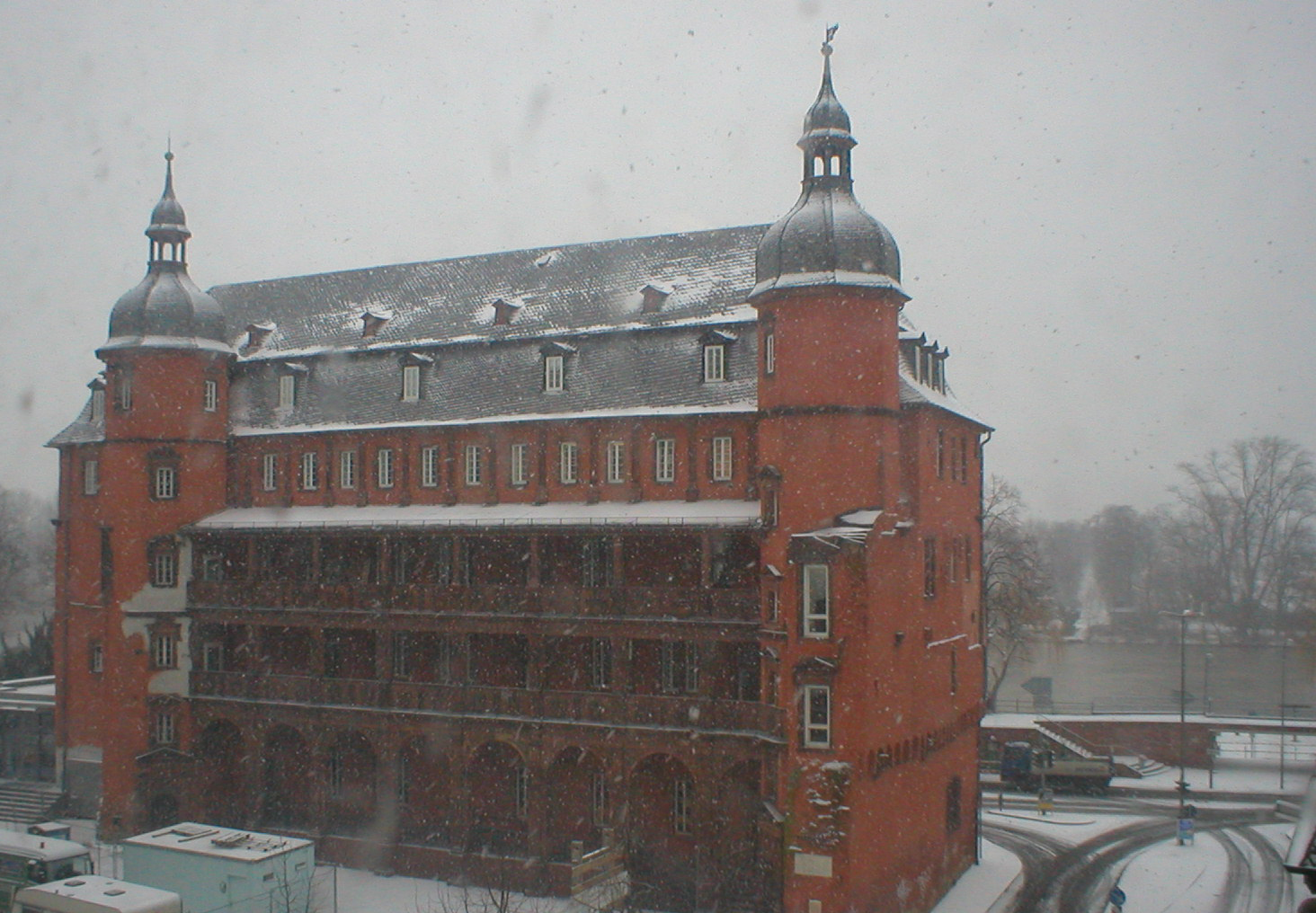
Isenburg Castle, Offenbach am Main, Germany, where Frank spent the last four years of his life

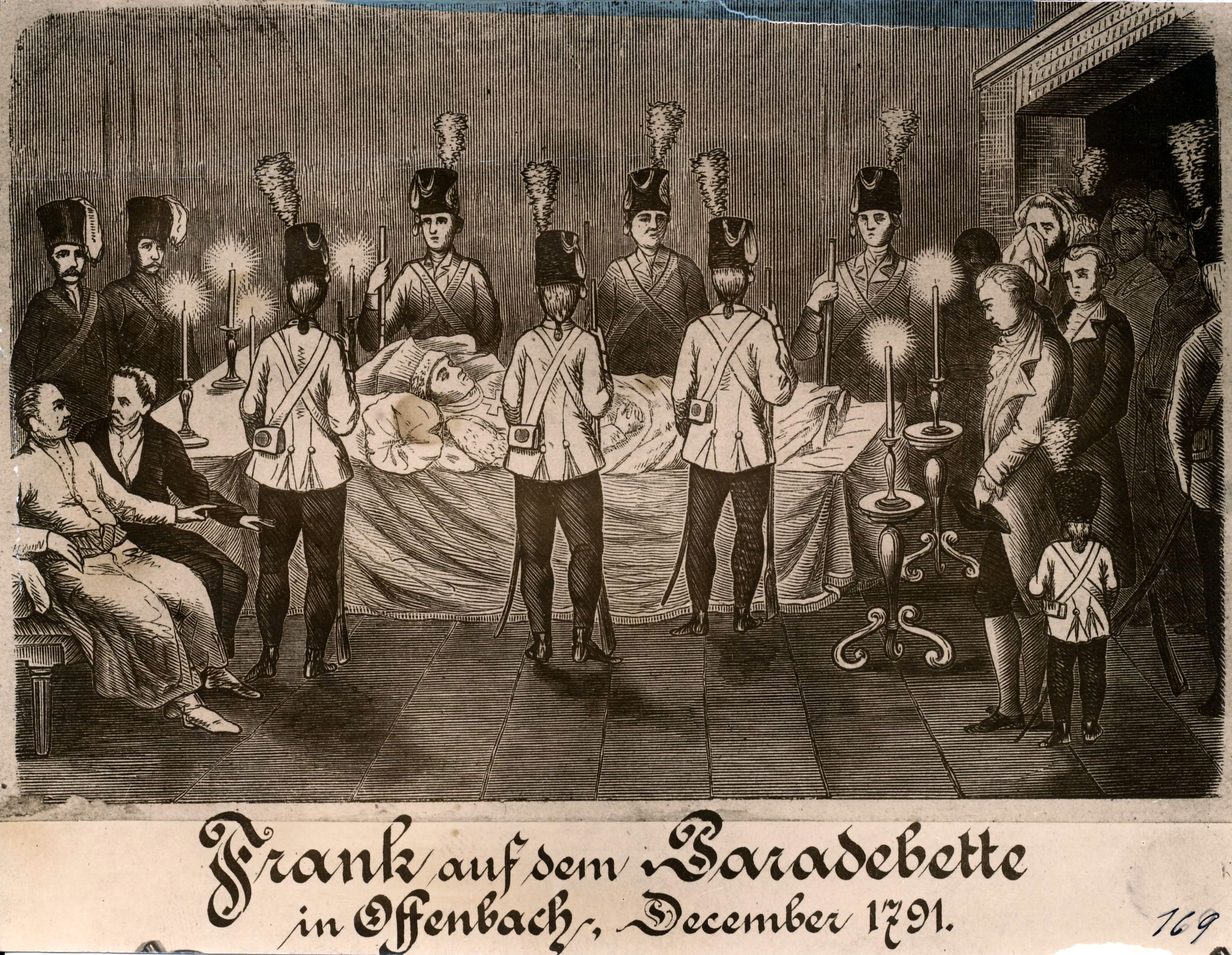
Jacob Frank on his deathbed, 1790

Frank's imprisonment lasted thirteen years, yet it only increased his influence with the sect by surrounding him with the aura of martyrdom. Many Frankists established themselves near Częstochowa, and kept up constant communication with their "holy master". Frank inspired his followers through mystical speeches and epistles, in which he stated that salvation could be gained only by first adopting the "religion of Edom" and later adopting a future religion which Frank called daas (daat, or Knowledge in Hebrew). After the first partition of Poland, Frank was released by the Russian general Bibikov, who had occupied Częstochowa, in August 1772.

Frank lived in the Moravian town of Brno until 1786, surrounded by a retinue of adherents and pilgrims who came from Poland. His daughter Eve began to play an important role in the sect at this time. Frank kept a force of armed men at his "court". The future czar Paul I of Russia visited him together with Joseph II, Holy Roman Emperor.

Accompanied by his daughter, Frank repeatedly traveled to Vienna, and succeeded in gaining the favor of the court. Maria Theresa regarded him as a disseminator of Christianity among the Jews, and it is even said that Joseph II was favorably inclined to the young Eve. Ultimately Frank was deemed unmanageable and he was obliged to leave Austria. He moved with his daughter and his retinue to Offenbach, in Germany, where he assumed the title of "Baron of Offenbach," and lived as a wealthy nobleman in Isenburg Castle, receiving financial support from his Polish and Moravian followers, who made frequent pilgrimages to Offenbach. On the death of Frank in 1790, Eve became the "holy mistress" and leader of the sect. Her fortunes dwindled in the aftermath of the Napoleonic Wars, and she died in Offenbach in 1816.

Some Frankists were active during the French Revolution, such as Moses Dobruška, a son of Frank's Sabbatian cousin in Offenbach Shendl Dobruska. Many of the Frankists saw Emperor Napoleon as a potential Messiah. The Frankists scattered in Poland and Bohemia eventually intermarried into the gentry and middle class. Maria Szymanowska, a piano virtuoso, came from a Frankist family. Wanda Grabowska, the mother of Tadeusz Boy-Żeleński, also descended from Frankists.

In 1883, a Russian magazine Русская старина (Russian Old Times) issued memoirs of an influential official of the Russian Ministry of the Interior, the privy councillor and staunch antisemite O. A. Pzhetslavsky. He promulgated the allegations that the mothers of "three of the greatest men of Poland" (Frédéric Chopin, Adam Mickiewicz and Juliusz Słowacki) were converted Jews from the Frankist sect. Similar assertions were put forth by Mieses and Balaban.

== Notable Sabbatian teachers of Jakob Frank ==
- Rabbi Issohar, one of Frank's principal teachers. A disciple of Hayim Malakh, Frank studied with him in İzmir in 1750–1752.
- Rabbi Mordechai ben Elias Margalit of Prague (Mardocheusz in Polish), another of Frank's principal teachers. He helped introduce Frank to the practices of the Karakashi sect of the Dönmeh in the Turkish empire, which worshipped Beruchiah Russo (also known as Otman Baba). Frank traveled with him to Salonika in November 1753. He left Bohemia and moved to the Ottoman Empire after Jakob Frank's uncle Moses Meir Kamenker was caught smuggling Sabbatian literature into Germany in 1725. Mordechai allegedly engaged in adultery and other antinomian conduct.
- Leib, a Jewish Sabbatian teacher of Frank's during the latter's childhood in Wallachia and Moldavia. He was also a wonderworker who attempted to dispel demons.

== Jacob Frank's writings ==
- The Collection of the Words of the Lord, available online in English. Translated, edited and annotated by Harris Lenowitz, with an introduction by Lenowitz.

== Cultural references ==
- Jacob Frank is the subject of Andrzej Żuławski's book Moliwda (1994).
- The personality of Frank has inspired the Polish historical movie Daas of 2011 directed by Adrian Panek. Frank is played by Olgierd Łukaszewicz.
- Jacob Frank is the central character in the novel by Polish Nobel laureate writer Olga Tokarczuk The Books of Jacob (Polish: Księgi Jakubowe) published in October 2014 by Wydawnictwo Literackie.
- Jacob Frank's story receives a new interpretation in the book "Shining Darkness", an historical novel by Pele Ohad Ezrahi (2022).

== See also ==
- Apostasy in Judaism
- Christianity and Judaism
- Criticism of the Talmud
- Harris Lenowitz, a professor at the University of Utah who has extensively studied Frank's writings
- List of messiah claimants
- Messiah complex
- Schisms among the Jews

== Bibliography ==
- Abrahams, Israel (1911). "Frank, Jakob" . In Chisholm, Hugh (ed.). Encyclopædia Britannica. Vol. 11 (11th ed.). Cambridge University Press. p. 15.
- Frank, Yakov (1978). Sayings of Yakov Frank. Translated by Lenowitz, Harris. Oakland, CA: Tzaddikim. ISBN 0-917246-05-5.
- Lenowitz, Harris (2001), "The Charlatan at the Gottes Haus in Offenbach", in Goldish, Matt; Popkin, Richard H. (eds.), Jewish Messianism in the Early Modern World, Dordrecth: Kluwer Academic, pp. 189–202.
- Maciejko, Pawel (2011). The Mixed Multitude: Jacob Frank and the Frankist Movement. Philadelphia: University of Pennsylvania Press. ISBN 978-0-8122-4315-4.
- Maciejko, Paweł (2004) [2003]. The Frankist Movement in Poland, the Czech Lands, and Germany (1755–1816). University of Oxford. OCLC 56118446.
- Maciejko, Pawel (2005). "Frankism" (PDF). The YIVO Encyclopedia of Jews in Eastern Europe. Yale University Press. Archived from the original (PDF) on 2006-10-03.
- Maciejko, Pawel (2005), "Baruch Yavan and the Frankist movement: Intercession in an age of upheaval", Jahrbuch des Simon-Dubnow-Instituts, 4: 333–354.
- Maciejko, Pawel (2006), "Christian elements in early Frankist doctrine", Gal-Ed, 20: 13–41.
- Mandel, Arthur (1979). The Militant Messiah: The Story of Jacob Frank and the Frankists. Atlantic Highlands, NJ: Humanities Press. ISBN 0-391-00973-7.
- Mieses, Mateusz (1938). Polacy–Chrześcijanie pochodzenia żydowskiego. Warsaw: Wydawn.
- Scholem, Gershom. "'Shabtai Zvi' and 'Jacob Frank and the Frankists'". Encyclopaedia Judaica (CD-ROM ed.). Archived from the original on January 16, 2009.
