= Moses Meïr Kamanker =

Polish Shabbethaian missionary from Zolkiev

Moses Meïr Kamanker (Yiddish: משה מאיר קאמינקער; fl. early 18th century) was a Polish Shabbethaian missionary from Zolkiev.

== Biography ==
Highly proficient in Talmudic studies and adept at dissimulation, Kamanker was sent by the Polish Shabbethaians to serve as a covert envoy to Moravia, Bohemia, and Germany, with the purpose of establishing connections with sympathizers of their movement in those regions. He visited Prague—where he engaged with Jonathan Eybeschütz—and other cities, as he endeavored to secretly spread Shabbethaian literature and potentially gather financial support for the sect's leaders.

Kamanker's mission came to an end in Frankfurt, where he was betrayed by a Polish rabbi to whom he had disclosed his plans. He was publicly exposed and placed under ḥerem by the rabbinate in July 1725.
