= Joseph Franz Molitor =

German writer and philosopher (1779–1860)

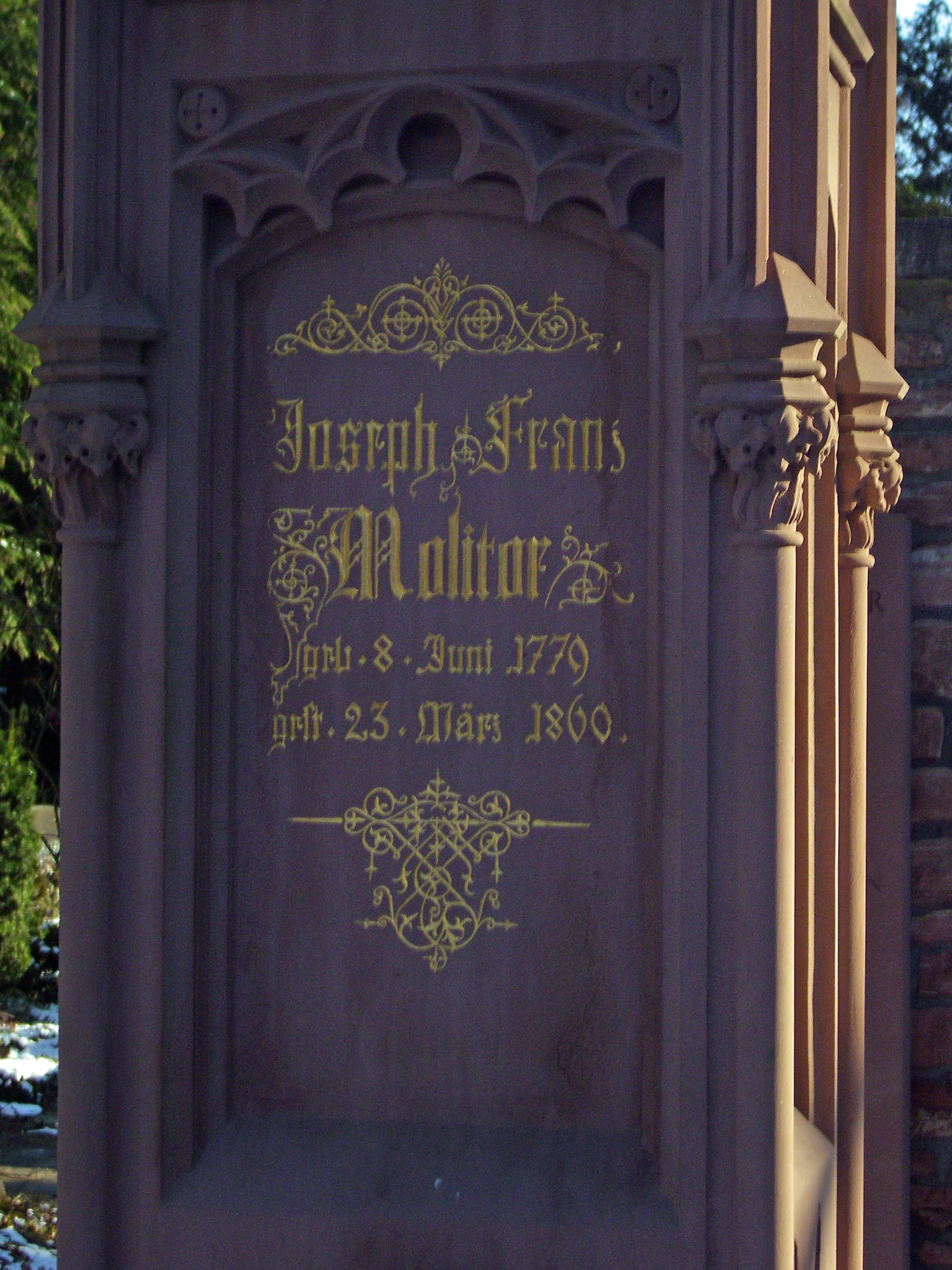
Joseph Franz Molitor gravesite (Frankfurt Main Cemetery)

Franz Joseph Molitor, or Joseph Franz Molitor (July 7, 1779 in Oberursel/Taunus – March 23, 1860 in Frankfurt/Main) was a German writer and philosopher.

== Life ==
Molitor was born the son of a Kurmainz civil servant. Beginning in 1797, he studied at the University of Mainz and from 1799 at the University of Marburg. He initially studied law but then switched to history and philosophy. He studied the works of Kant, Reinhold, Fichte and Schelling. From 1802, he was co-editor of the short-lived Zeitschrift für eine künftig aufzustellende Rechtswissenschaft nach dem Princip eines transscendentalen Realismus. Under the influence of theosophist Franz Xaver von Baader, he attempted in his writings to reconcile philosophical realism with idealism.

In 1806 Molitor joined the board of directors of the Jewish educational institution Philanthropin in Frankfurt am Main. In 1812 Molitor became professor of philosophy at the new Lyceum Carolinum in Frankfurt, which Karl Theodor von Dalberg had set up on the French model; after the end of 1814 he drew a permanent pension from there, with which he - in addition to income from private tuition and his work at the philanthropist - could make a living.

== Freemasonry and Kabbalah ==
After becoming acquainted with Judaism and its own symbolic language, Molitor entered the Frankfurt Freemason's Lodge "Zur Aufstieg Morgenröthe" on May 19, 1808, in which Jews could also be a member; at times he was their chairman. Later, with the support of the landgrave Carl von Hessen, he founded the Frankfurt Lodge "Carl zum aufgehenden Licht".

In 1813, Molitor began to work intensively on Jewish mysticism. The Jewish mystic and Hochgrad - Freemason Ephraim Joseph Hirschfeld exerted a major influence on him. Molitor learned the Hebrew and Aramaic, studied the Talmud and Zohar. His endeavor was to put Kabbalah and Christianity in mutual connection and to unite both on a higher level, an approach that is not dissimilar to Hirschfeld's.

As the fruit of many years of study, he published the first volume of his Philosophy of History or Tradition in 1824, which gave him the support of scholarships from Christian von Hessen-Darmstadt and (mediated by Schelling) Ludwig I. from Bavaria. His apartment gradually became a gathering point for mystically interested men and women from Frankfurt and the surrounding area. He was unable to complete his five-volume work.

The main starting point of his argumentation was the fight against pantheism, atheism and materialism, based on the assumption that the Kabbalah contains a higher mysticism that could also be inherent in Christianity. In this respect, his title as "Christian Kabbalist" is well justified.

Molitor's Philosophie der Geschichte oder über die Tradition was an influence on Gershom Scholem and Walter Benjamin. Benjamin's first encounter with the Kabbalah was through Molitor's work and Benjamin proudly displayed Molitor's works on his bookshelves until his untimely death.

== Literary works ==
- Ideen zu einer künftigen Dynamik der Geschichte, 1805
- Philosophie der Geschichte, 4 vols., 1824–1853

== Bibliography ==
Katharina Koch, Franz Joseph Molitor und die jüdische Tradition. Studien zu den kabbalistischen Quellen der "Philosophie der Geschichte". Mit einem Anhang unveröffentlichten Briefe von F. von Baader, E. J. Hirschfeld, F. J. Molitor und F. W. J. Schelling, Walter de Gruyter Verlag, Berlin 2006
