= Eve Frank =

Self-proclaimed Jewish messiah (1754–1816/17)

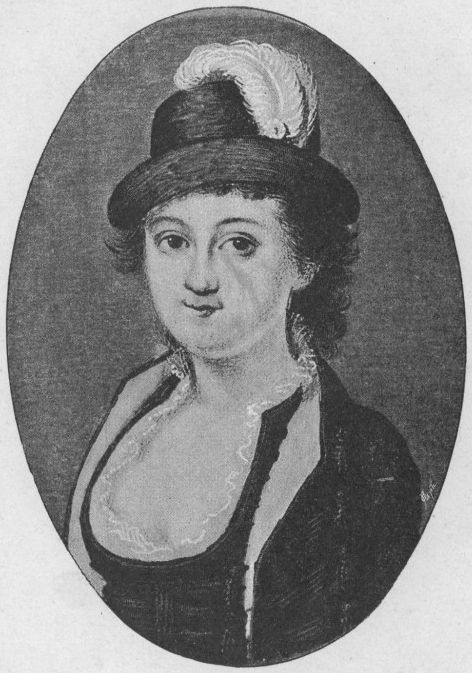
- Eva Frank
- Born: Rachel Frank; Nikopol, Ottoman Empire (now Bulgaria)
- Other name: Eva Romanovna
- Father: Jacob Frank

Eve Frank or Eva Frank (1754 – 1816 or 1817) born Rachel Frank in Nikopol, Ottoman Empire (now Bulgaria), was a mystic cult leader, and the only woman to have been declared a Jewish messiah according to historian Jerry Rabow. She was the daughter of Jacob Frank.

== Early life ==
Rachel Frank received the name of Eve in 1760 upon the conversion of her family to Catholicism. For much of her life, she accompanied her father during his travels and after the death of her mother in 1770, the then 16-year-old Eve was declared to be the incarnation of the Shekinah, the female aspect of God, as well as the reincarnation of the Virgin Mary and thus became the object of a devotional subcult herself near the Catholic Marian shrine of Częstochowa, with some followers keeping small statues of her in their homes. According to historian Jerry Rabow, she was the only woman to have been declared a Jewish messiah.

Her father Jacob spread the rumor that Eve, who was often called "Eva Romanovna" at that point, was an illegitimate child of Catherine II of Russia. Eve and her father repeatedly traveled to Vienna, and succeeded in gaining the favor of the court.

== Religious leader ==
Upon the death of her father in 1791, Eve became the "holy mistress" and leader of the cult. Eve Frank and her two younger brothers, Josef and Rochus, assumed responsibility for the direction of the cult. Many people continued to go up to Offenbach am Main, to Gottes Haus, as the believers called it.

In 1800, the Franks sent "red letters" (in red ink) to hundreds of Jewish communities encouraging conversion to Frankism. However, the Frank siblings had neither the stature nor the strength of personality required to keep the cult going and as time went on the number of pilgrims and supply of money diminished drastically, while Eve continued to live in her accustomed luxury.

In November 1813, after the battle of Leipzig, Tsar Alexander I, then emperor of Russia, rode from Frankfurt to Offenbach to visit Eve.

== Death and controversy ==
She finally became heavily indebted by three million gulden in 1817. It was alleged that she died in poverty in 1816, although she is believed to have escaped to Poland and continued to lead the community after the dismantling of the Frankist court and arrest order from the Grand Duke of Hesse. Nonetheless, her followers continued to exist well into the middle of the 19th century.
