= Józef Mieses =

Polish rabbi, linguist, and Army officer

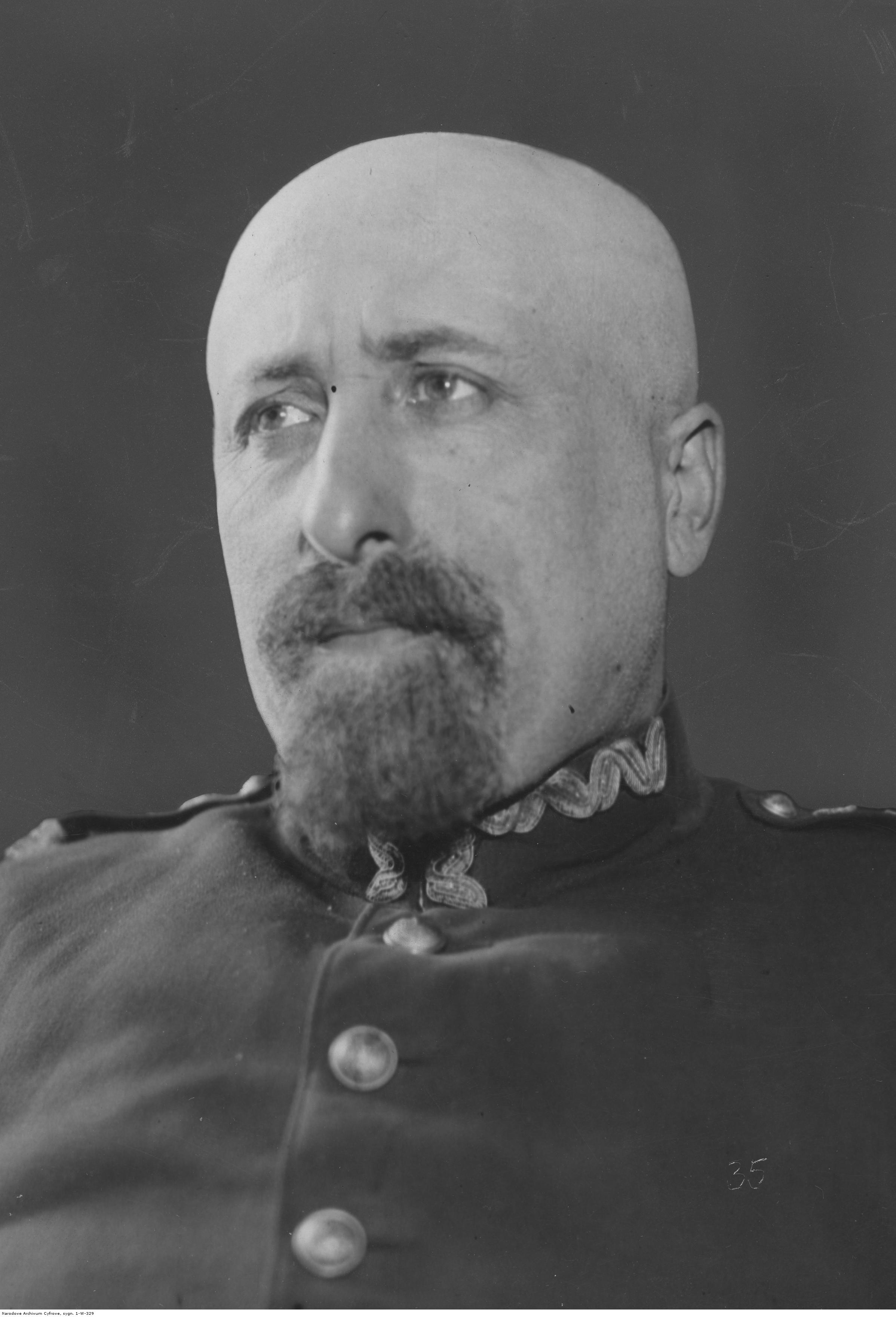
- Born: October 1, 1882; Przemyśl, Kingdom of Galicia and Lodomeria, Cisleithania, Austria-Hungary
- Died: 1942 (aged 59–60)
- Allegiance: Austria-Hungary (1914-1918); Republic of Poland (1920-1932)
- Service: Imperial and Royal Army (1914-1918); Polish Armed Forces (1920-1932)
- Service years: 1914–1918 and 1920–1932
- Conflicts: World War I

Józef Mieses (1882–1941 or 1942) was a Polish teacher, linguist, rabbi and military officer.

He reached the rank of colonel and chief rabbi in the Polish Army, where from 1921 to 1932 he worked in the Polish Ministry of Defense as the Chief of the Judaism Department. He published several works related to linguistics and was a recipient of the Polish Cross of Merit. He is presumed to have died during the Nazi occupation of Poland, most likely in 1942.
