= Frankism =

Jewish religious movement created by Jacob Frank

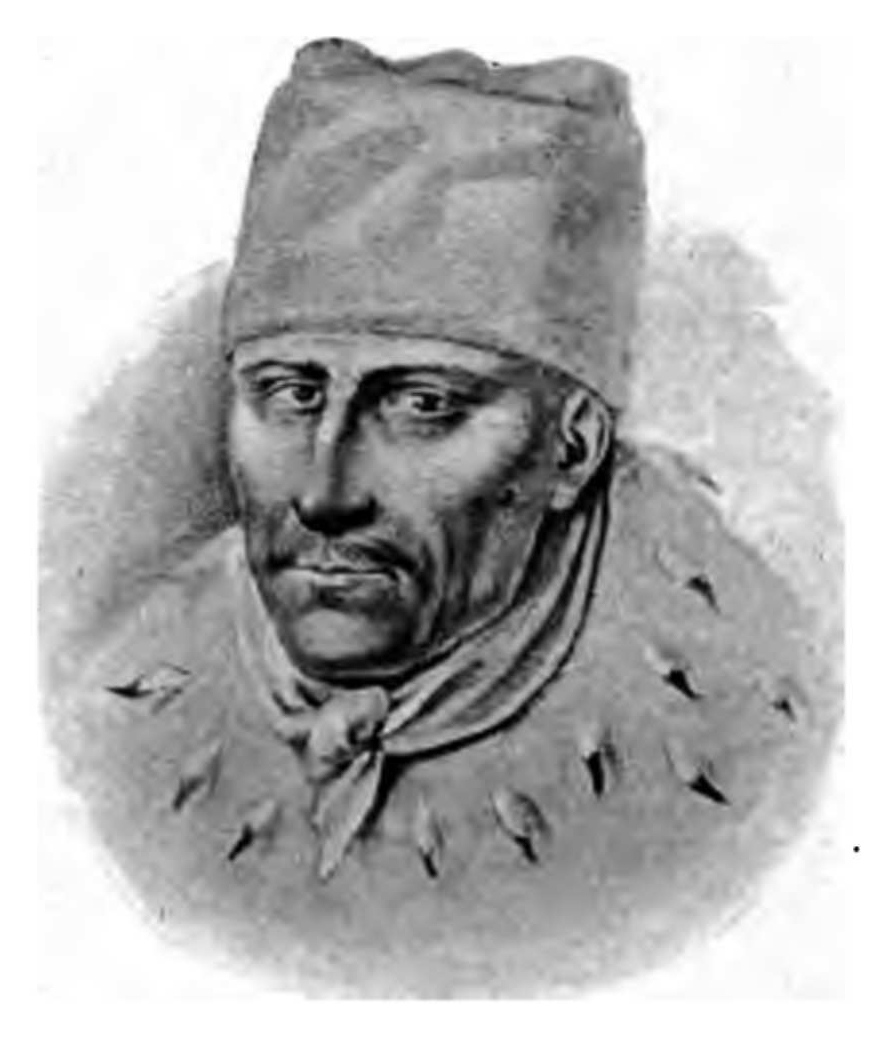
Jacob Frank, 1895 depiction

Frankism was a Sabbatean religious movement originating in the Polish–Lithuanian Commonwealth in the 18th and 19th centuries. Created in Podolia, it was named after its founder, Jacob Frank. Frank completely rejected Jewish norms, preaching to his followers that they were obligated to transgress moral boundaries, embracing antinomianism. Frankists engaged in incest, orgies and sex rituals, such as the infamous 1756 incident in Lanškroun where they were allegedly caught dancing around a half-naked woman symbolizing the Shekhinah.

At its height, Frankism claimed perhaps 50,000 followers, primarily Jews living in the Polish–Lithuanian Commonwealth and other parts of Central and Eastern Europe. Later, Frankists were encouraged to convert en masse to Catholicism.

== Description ==
Frankists believed in Sabbatai Zevi, one of the most famous of all self-proclaimed messiahs in Jewish history. He believed in transgressing Jewish commandments to elevate the "divine sparks" constrained by them. He performed actions that violated traditional Jewish prohibitions, such as eating foods forbidden by kashrut, the Jewish dietary laws, and celebrating fast days as feast days. He eventually converted to Islam rather than face execution for claiming to be the Messiah. After Zevi's death, several branches of Sabbateanism evolved that disagreed over which aspects of Judaism should be preserved.

Jacob Frank claimed to be a reincarnation of Sabbatai Zevi and followed and extended his practice of transgression. Father-daughter incest was commonly practised by his followers, and orgies featured prominently in ritual. Frank claimed that "all laws and teachings will fall", and following antinomianism, asserted that the most important obligation of humanity was the transgression of every boundary.

== Organization ==
Jacob Frank stood at the head of Frankism. He regarded his followers as soldiers, and all were members of a company to build an army to secure Frank's rule over a Frankist country. There were four company locations, in Ivanie, Częstochowa, Brno, and Offenbach am Main. Members were required to wear plate armor, shields, and helmets, and to train hard.

His teachings were not intended for the ears of all Frankists, but only for his personally selected circle of so-called "Brothers and Sisters", of whom he demanded blind obedience. Frank tried to maintain absolute control over at least this circle, taking advantage of their tendency to believe in shedim and magic. Frank spoke directly only to the "Brothers"; according to his teachings, nothing could be done with women alone, since women had brought death into the world.

== Doctrine ==
=== "Words of the Lord" ===
The most important Frankist text is the Księga Słów Pańskich ("Book of the Words of the Lord"). It is written in Polish in an elementary, almost folk style and consists of short sayings (some fewer than ten words), interpretations and parables, visions and dreams; longer speculations about the elements of the doctrine; various episodes from Frank's life, the Frankist "company" and contemporary rulers; and fairy-tale stories up to 1100 words long. To support them, there are quotations from the Torah and the Zohar and popular stories from the surrounding culture, quoted verbatim or paraphrased or adapted to Frank's doctrine. The text begins and ends with a vision: § 1 is Frank's vision of his calling; § 2192 is Frank's final testament to his "company". The Words of the Lord belongs to Jewish literature, but its contents reject Jewish tradition and teachings. Biblical figures such as Jacob, Esau and Esther are the foundations of Frank's teaching.

Frank's "Brothers" compiled the work between 1755 and 1791 as a Zbiór (collection) of materials developed in numerous meetings. The original Polish title Księga (book) is therefore somewhat misleading and appears only once in the collection, in § 2192. It was written down starting around 1773 and distributed exclusively in handwritten form to his widely scattered followers. The last known complete manuscript (Words of the Lord §§ 1–2192) was destroyed, along with numerous other Frankist sources, during the destruction of Warsaw in World War II. Until recently, all researchers of Frankism have relied on the extensive biography by the historian Aleksander Kraushar, the most important study of Frankism from the prewar period.

=== The "V" doctrine ===
In Frankism, Frank is the third messianic incarnation of Tiferet after Sabbatai Zevi and Baruchiah Russo (1677–1720), and also the reborn forefather Jacob. Nonetheless, he is only a "helper". The actual guide in Frankism is the Virgin, the incarnation of the Shekhinah and the female Messiah. Frankists are supposed to follow her bravely, like soldiers, through all horrors. The path by which Frank sought to lead his followers to "life" was symbolized by the letter "V", which also represents Jacob's ladder. The seeker must first descend into the abyss to reach the deepest level of humiliation and then climb back up to "life". According to Frankist doctrine, the patriarchs and Moses had already tried to follow the path but failed, as had Zevi.

Frank proclaims that the Frankists' descent down the "V" ladder into the deepest humiliation is reflected in society's hatred and exclusion of them, which result from Frankism's consistent implementation of the idea that all worldly laws and teachings are only laws of the "Three Evil World Rulers" (the Pope, the Tsar, and the Sultan) and therefore need not be observed. In the best case, such laws and teachings need only be kept in pretense; worldly religions and teachings can be worn like an empty shell and discarded at whim because the "true Torah" is yet to be revealed. The Mosaic Law with its Ten Commandments should be despised, as it is part of the "old Torah". The contempt for all worldly teachings culminates in a statement by Frank to the "Brothers and Sisters" that amounts to a command for total assimilation: one should adapt to the respective religion or language depending on the country. Frank also advises masked assimilation in the following passage:

Solomon was wise, wiser than all the peoples. He mixed with the nations, took the daughters of kings as his wives, but he did not get anything out of it. He could mix with the nations because he was a king. But here the whole world knows that I am descendant from Jews, that I am newly baptized and poor. But I have hope that I will mix with their society this winter, and they themselves will call me. I can tell you: whoever does not mix with the nations, all his work is in vain!

Frank was not interested in the acculturation of the Jews; rather, he wanted them to integrate into society to overthrow it. If the Jews' enemies in the 18th century had been familiar with Frank's secret sectarian canon, it would have made the already hotly contested Jewish emancipation considerably more difficult.

=== The Virgin ===
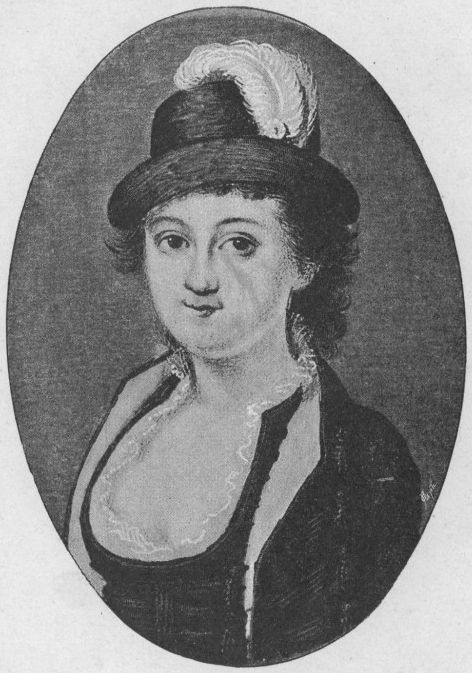
The Frankist Virgin, Eve Frank (1774)

The center of Frankism was a new concept of the Shekhinah, but the term was forbidden in Frankism because Frank called her "the Virgin". "Shekhinah" is a Kabbalistic term. Klaus Samuel Davidowicz, a Jewish studies scholar at the University of Vienna who has written extensively on Frank and Frankism, assumes it was initially an old name for God that referred to the indwelling or presence of God in a specific place. According to Frank's teachings, all the important forefathers—Abraham, Isaac, Jacob, and Moses—strove toward the Virgin, who manifested herself in different persons, such as Rachel, and all failed. Moses' liberation from Egypt could not have been complete either, since the foundation of salvation is the Virgin. But now, according to Frank, the real Virgin had arrived, a female Messiah visible to all people: his daughter Eve Frank. In a teaching, Frank identifies himself with the traditional Messiah ben Joseph, who will have a significant impact but perish in the fight against the enemies of the end times. Just as he precedes the Messiah ben David, Frank prepares the way for the Virgin, his daughter.

Frankism characterizes the Virgin using elements of the Esther stories and is strongly influenced by the veneration of Mary in the Catholic Church surrounding the Black Madonna of Częstochowa. He said the Black Madonna would lead his followers to the Frankist Virgin and therefore presented baptism as a necessary step. Following the Bahir and the Zohar, in which the Shekhinah is described as like a princess in a tower, Frank refers to an actual tower of the Jasna Góra Monastery where he was exiled. He had miniature portraits of his daughter Eve made corresponding to Catholic images of Mary, mother of Jesus; these are now in the National Library of Israel. But Eve, as Shekhinah, was an element that had not yet appeared during Frank's lifetime. The Virgin was hidden from Frank, and his task was to free her. The Black Madonna points to the true Virgin, who will be revealed before the final redemption. Frank regarded himself as the Virgin's guide, who, before her manifestation, is in a "mysterious place" and was given only to him since the beginning of the world, so that he, as her father, would be her guardian. The soul of the Shekhinah was still with Frank; his "Brothers" were unworthy to see her. They were supposed to support Frank in finding the Virgin. Depending on the company's behaviour, the Virgin would behave positively or negatively towards them, a well-known idea from the Kabbalistic descriptions of the Shekhinah. During her father’s lifetime, Eve Frank held a special position within the "company": as soon as she was old enough, she stood at her father's side as a confidant and adjutant. Frank repeatedly accused his followers of having fallen back into Judaism, thus preventing the liberation of the Virgin. The only way to the Virgin is to adapt to the Polish environment.

The liberation of the Shekhinah—the transfer of the Shekhinah's soul from Jacob to Eve Frank—is also described in some longer fairy-tale-like narratives in the Words of the Lord, which are reminiscent of Middle Eastern models in the 1001 Nights. They use traditional Kabbalistic terminology, with concealment and disguise as a gardener an important motif; the garden stands for a symbolic setting of the world of the ten sefirot. The strengthening of the second Sephirah, Chokmah, the male principle (also known as the upper Shechinah), also leads to the liberation of the lower Shekhinah. In Frank's perception of the Virgin, it is clear how deeply his ideas are rooted in Kabbalah and other Jewish writings, despite Christian influences. The author(s) of the Words of the Lord who created such colorful parables and allegories required an excellent knowledge of Kabbalistic literature.

=== Da'at, the mystical goal ===
Tree of Life: the Sephiroth

The last stage of the mystical path in Frankism is Da'at, "cosmic cognizance". In the Zohar, as in Frankism, Da'at is the mystical place where all ten sefirot are united. It is an apparent sefira, which cosmologically means the "concealed knowledge" that creates a harmonizing union between two sefirot: the male principle of Chokmah and the female principle of Binah. It results from the fusion of these cosmic forces. On a physical level, "knowledge" means the sexual union of man and woman, which manifests itself in the union of Adam and Eve in Genesis 4:1. It is thus possible to reach Da'at through sexual intercourse. With the help of sexual rites, Frank wished to reach Da'as on earth, the last step of Jacob's ladder. This knowledge was a higher realization that would bring a deep insight into everything. It was enlightenment and a fresh realization in one. With it would be associated a new name and a new soul.

Frank emphasized that all the patriarchs, including Sabbatai Zevi, had been unable to enter Da'at because they had not been baptized. To be worthy of entering the Da'at, one must first reach the level of Esau, the acceptance of Catholicism.

Frankism allowed all its followers to take part in the mystical search for Da'at but demanded blind obedience to its leader and complete abandonment of all laws and teachings, which, in any case, they only appeared to follow, true to the motto: "The more blind and radical my obedience to my Lord, the more likely the possibility of reaching Da'at." After accepting Catholicism, Frankists strove to complete the personal path to Da'at, which in the end would be possible for only a few select "Brothers and Sisters".

The triangle or "V" of the ladder refers to the Trinity, but also to the earthly path of the Frankists: by getting rid of all laws and teachings, they degraded themselves and incurred society's contempt. The "V" is applied to Edom, Shekhinah, and Da'at, meaning Frankists should be baptized to reach the cosmic Esau, or, at the tip of the "V", the Virgin, who will raise them from the depths of their exile, leading them back up to Da'at. The beginning of the entry into Da'at will be seen on earth when Frankists are integrated into non-Jewish society and accepted by the international community. Then the mystical-cosmological path will continue.

== Scholarly analysis ==
Several authorities on Sabbateanism, such as Heinrich Graetz and Aleksander Kraushar, were skeptical of the existence of a distinctive Frankist doctrine. According to Gershom Scholem, a 20th-century authority on Sabbateanism and Kabbalah, Kraushar called Frank's sayings "grotesque, comical and incomprehensible". In his classic essay "Redemption Through Sin", Scholem placed Frankism as a later and more radical outgrowth of Sabbateanism. In contrast, Jay Michaelson argues that Frankism was "an original theology that was innovative, if sinister" and in many respects a departure from earlier formulations of Sabbateanism. In traditional Sabbatean doctrine, Zevi (and often his followers) claimed to be able to liberate the sparks of holiness hidden within what seemed to be evil. According to Michaelson, Frank's theology asserted that the attempt to liberate the sparks of holiness was the problem, not the solution. Instead, Frank claimed that the "mixing" between holy and unholy was virtuous.

Netanel Lederberg claims that Frank had a Gnostic philosophy wherein there was a true God whose existence was hidden by a demiurge. This "true God" could allegedly be revealed only through the destruction of the social and religious structures created by the demiurge, thus leading to a thorough antinomianism. For Frank, the distinction between good and evil is a product of a world governed by the "false God". Lederberg compares Frank's position to that of Friedrich Nietzsche.

== After Jacob Frank ==
After Jacob Frank’s death in 1791, leadership of the Frankist movement passed to his daughter, Eve Frank (Ewa Frank), who had been proclaimed the "Holy Virgin" and a kind of messianic counterpart to her father as early as 1770. Jacob Frank had prepared her for spiritual leadership, referring to her in quasi-divine terms. She became a central symbolic figure in the cult’s theology, which drew heavily on inversion, sexual ritual, and antinomian reinterpretation of Christian and Jewish symbols.

Eve maintained a cult-like following in Offenbach, Germany, where the remaining Frankist elite resided. They continued to act as a quasi-mystical sect, dressing in ornate ceremonial clothing, preserving a secretive hierarchical structure, and perpetuating doctrines inherited from Frank—particularly those related to the sacralization of transgression and the subversion of traditional religious laws.

By this time, the Frankist identity had largely detached from Judaism altogether. Most adherents had been baptized into Catholicism.

Eve Frank ruled over the community until her death in 1816. Afterward, the movement gradually disintegrated as a formal sect.

== Modern-day references to 'Frankism' ==
Many references to Frankism have been characterized as antisemitic tropes in academic and media sources.

A conspiracy theory pushed by some people, such as Candace Owens, calls Frankism "the preferred religion of the elites" and associates it with devil worship and modern-day inversion rituals.

== See also ==
- Khlyst

== Bibliography ==
- Emeliantseva, Ekaterina, "Zwischen jüdischer Tradition und frankistischer Mystik. Zur Geschichte der Prager Frankistenfamilie Wehle: 1760–1800", Jewish History Quarterly/Kwartalnik Historii Żydów 4 (2001), pp. 549–65.
- Emeliantseva Koller, Ekaterina, "Der fremde Nachbar: Warschauer Frankisten in der Pamphletliteratur des Vierjährigen Sejms: 1788–1792", in: A. Binnenkade, E. Emeliantseva, S. Pacholkiv (eds.), Vertraut und fremd zugleich. Jüdisch-christliche Nachbarschaften in Warschau – Lengnau – Lemberg (= Jüdische Moderne 8), Cologne/Weimar: Böhlau 2009, pp. 21–94.
- Emeliantseva Koller, Ekaterina, "Situative Religiosität – situative Identität: Neue Zugänge zur Geschichte des Frankismus in Prag (1750–1860)", in: P. Ernst, G. Lamprecht (eds.), Konzeptionen des Jüdischen – Kollektive Entwürfe im Wandel (= Schriften des Centrums für Jüdische Studien 11), Innsbruck 2009, pp. 38–62.
- Frank, Yakov (1978). Sayings of Yakov Frank. Harris Lenowitz (trans.). Oakland, California: Tzaddikim. ISBN 0-917246-05-5.
- Maciejko, Pawel (2011). The Mixed Multitude:Jacob Frank and the Frankist Movement. Philadelphia: University of Pennsylvania Press. ISBN 978-0-8122-4315-4.
- Maciejko, Pawel (2003). The Frankist Movement in Poland, the Czech Lands, and Germany (1755–1816). Oxford University Press.
- Maciejko, Pawel (2005). "Frankism" ( (PDF)). The YIVO Encyclopedia of Jews in Eastern Europe. Yale University Press. Archived from the original on 2006-10-03.
- Maciejko, Pawel (2005). "'Baruch Yavan and the Frankist movement: intercession in an age of upheaval", Jahrbuch des Simon-Dubnow-Instituts 4 (2005) pp. 333–54.
- Maciejko, Pawel (2006). "'Christian elements in early Frankist doctrine", Gal-Ed 20 (2006) pp. 13–41.
- Mandel, Arthur (1979). The Militant Messiah: The Story of Jacob Frank and the Frankists. Atlantic Highlands, New Jersey: Humanities Press. ISBN 0-391-00973-7.
- Mieses, Mateusz (1938). Polacy–Chrześcijanie pochodzenia żydowskiego [Poles-Christians of Jewish origin] (in Polish). Warsaw: Wydawn.
- Scholem, Gershom. "'Shabtai Zvi' and 'Jacob Frank and the Frankists'". Encyclopaedia Judaica (CD-ROM ed.). Archived from the original on 2009-01-16.
