= The Paris of the Second Empire in Baudelaire =

Essay by Walter Benjamin

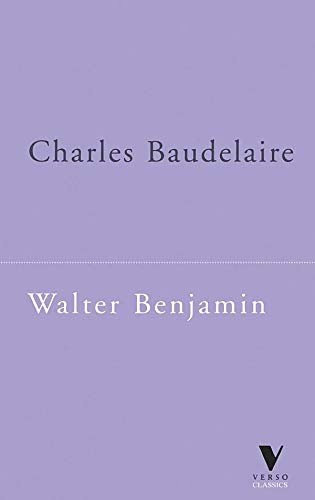
Cover of Charles Baudelaire by Walter Benjamin

"The Paris of the Second Empire in Baudelaire" (German: Das Paris des Second Empire bei Baudelaire; 1938) is one of a diptych of completed essays composed by Walter Benjamin. "Paris, Capital of 19th Century" is its sister essay.

== Summary ==
"The Paris of the Second Empire in Baudelaire" is organized into three sections: (1) La Bohème (2) The Flâneur (3) Modernity.

In a summary of "La Bohème", Michael Jennings writes: "For Benjamin, the bohemians were not primarily artistes starving in garrets-think of Rodolfo and Mimi in Puccini's La Boheme-but a motley collection of amateur and professional conspirators who imagined the overthrow of the regime of Napoleon III, France's self-elected emperor."

Michael Jennings wrote about "The Flâneur":

The flâneur strolls through the urban crowd as prosthetic vehicle of a new vision; the department store as phantasmagoric space of display and consumption; the commercialization and final alienation of the intelligentsia; the prostitute as concatenated image--of death and woman, 'seller and sold in one'; the gradual denaturing of art as it is subsumed by commodification and fashion, and the replacement of experience by the new concept of information.

== See also ==
- The Frankfurt School
- Marxist hermeneutics
