= Paris, Capital of the 19th Century =

Essay by Walter Benjamin

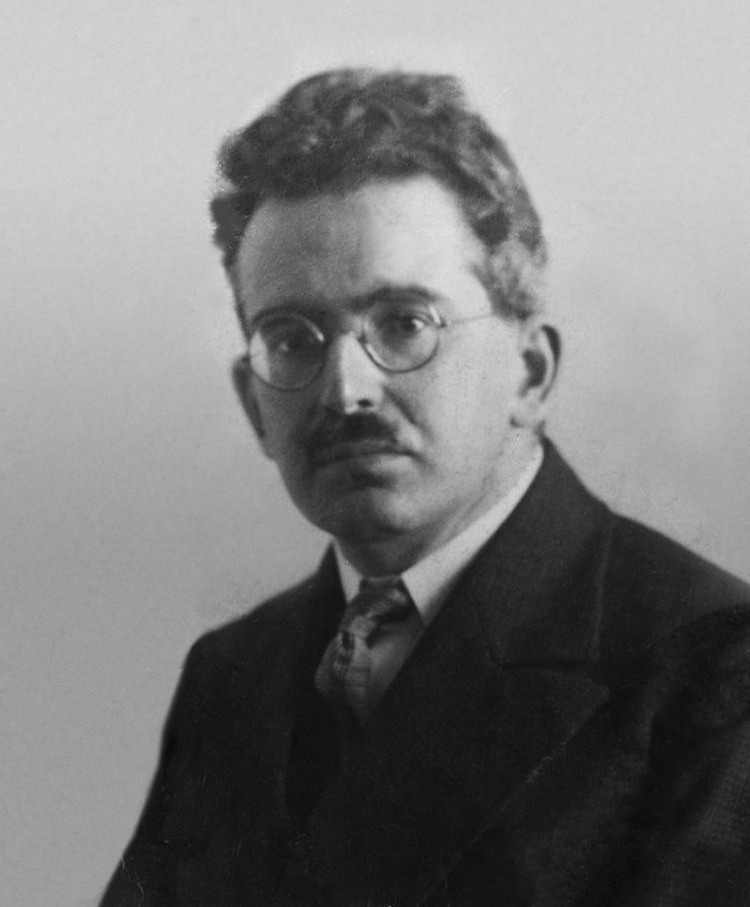
In “Paris, Capital of the 19th Century” (1935), Walter Benjamin addresses the co-evolution of architecture, city-planning, art-forms and self-perception.

"Paris, Capital of the 19th Century" (German: Paris, Hauptstadt des 19. Jahrhunderts; 1938) is one of a diptych of essays composed by Walter Benjamin while composing of Arcades Project. The Paris of the Second Empire in Baudelaire is its sister essay.

== History ==
In the late twenties, Walter Benjamin began to collect material and ideas for a history of the emergence of urban commodity capitalism in Paris around 1850. This eventually became Arcades Project.

== Summary ==
"Paris, Capital of the 19th Century" has six sections: (1) Fourier, or the Arcades; (2) Daguerre, or the Panoramas; (3) Grandville, or the World Exhibitions; (4) Louis-Philippe, or the Interior; (5) Baudelaire, or the Streets of Paris; (6) Hausmann, or the Barricades.

== Fourier, or the Arcades ==
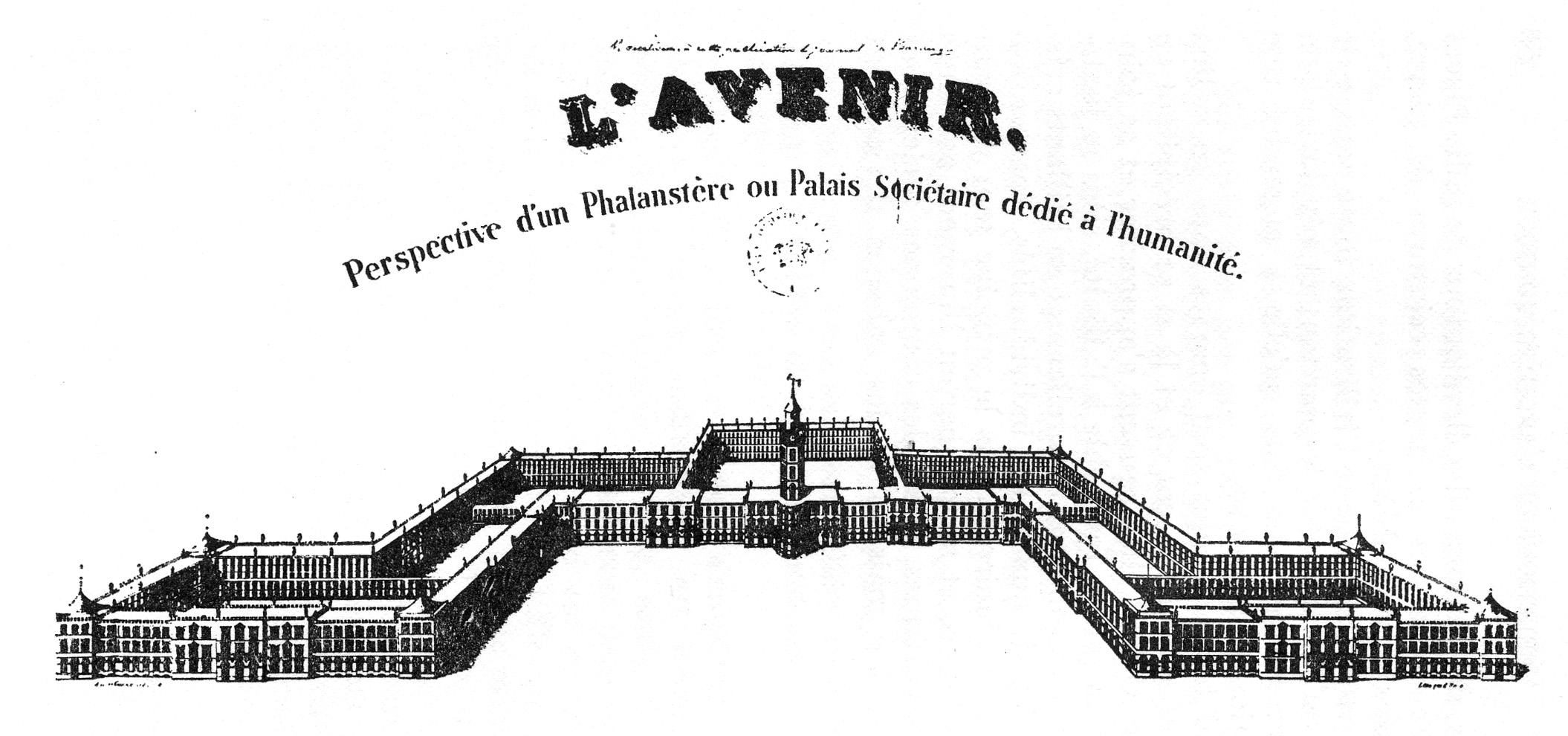
Perspective view of the urban area of Fourier's Phalanstère

The construction of the Arcades in the earlier half of the 19th century is described as well as attendant innovations (e.g. "The arcades are the scene of the first gas lighting." The construction of the arcades is coextensive with "the advent of building in iron.").

Benjamin compares the project of the Arcades to Fourier's phalanstery, a type of building designed for a self-contained utopian community that was "supposed to lead men back to the condition in which virtue is superfluous."

== Daguerre, or the Panoramas ==
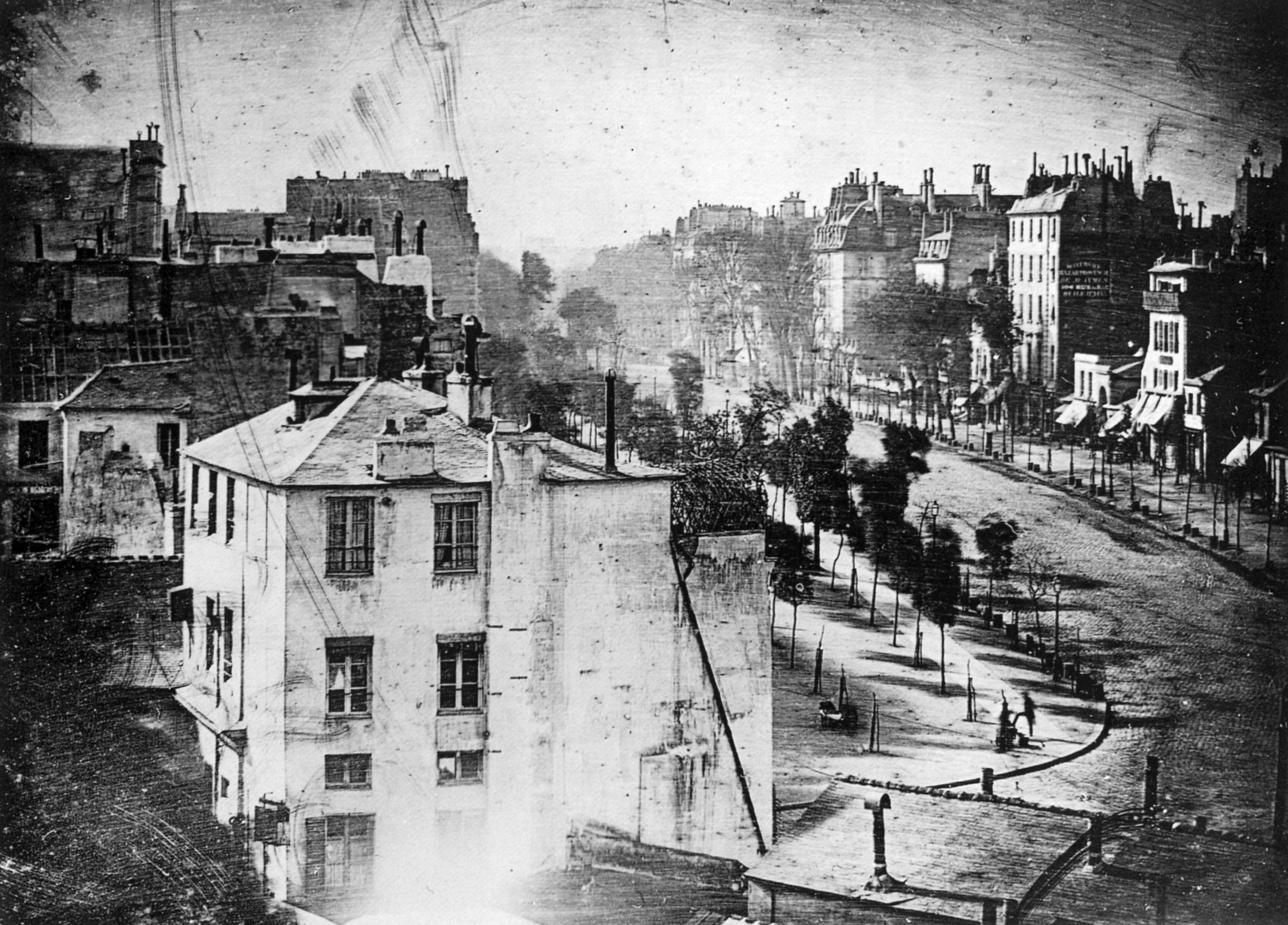
View of the Boulevard du Temple, taken by Daguerre in 1838 in Paris

Benjamin compares the Fourier's innovations and Louis Daguerre's. "As architecture begins to outgrow art in the use of iron construction, so does painting in the panoramas."

Benjamin observes, "Photography leads to the annihilation of the portrait minitiaturist [... Photography's] importance becomes greater the more questionable, in face of the new technical and social reality, the subjective element in painting and graphic information is felt to be... Photography for its part has...enormously expanded the scope of the commodity trade by putting on the market in unlimited quantities figures, landscapes, events that have either not been salable at all or have been available only as pictures for single customers."

== Grandville, or the World Exhibitions ==
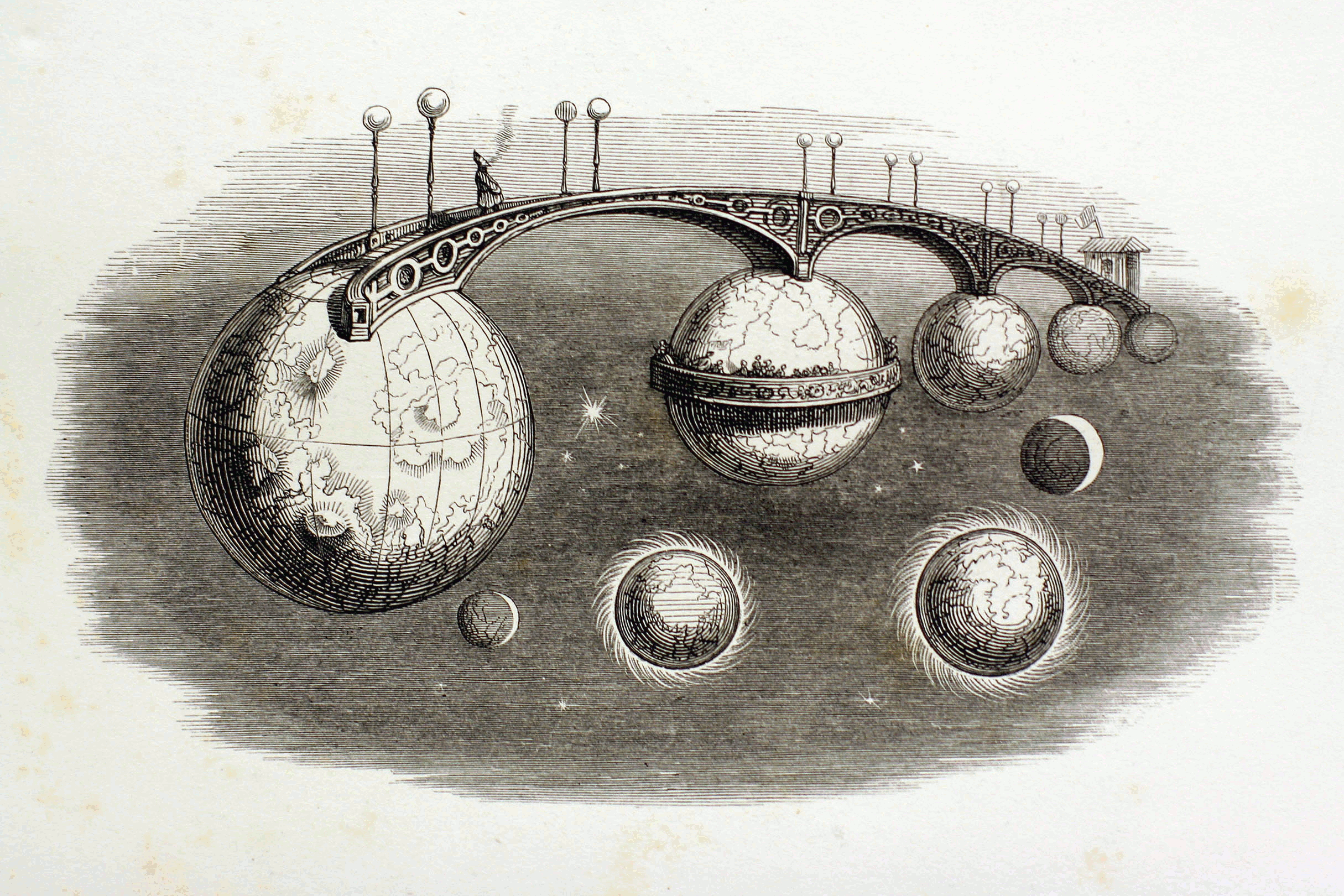
Illustration by Grandville from Un Autre Monde. "Saturn's ring becomes a cast iron balcony on which the inhabitants of the planet take the air in the evening."

== Louis Philippe, or the Interior ==
In this section, Benjamin discusses apartments and interior decoration. "For the private person, living space becomes, for the first time, antithetical to the place of work." The apartment "entombs" the traces of its occupant.

== Haussmann, or the Barricades ==
This section describes Haussmann's renovation of Paris and the beginning of modern finance capital. Benjamin writes that:

Paris experiences a flowering of speculation. Playing the stock exchange displaces the game of chance in the forms that had come down from feudal society. To the phantasmagorias of space to which the flâneur abandons himself, correspond the phantasmagorias of time indulged by the gambler. Gambling converts time into a narcotic. Lafargue declares gaming an imitation in miniature of the mysteries of economic prosperity.

== See also ==
- The Frankfurt School
- Marxist hermeneutics
