= On the Mimetic Faculty =

Essay by Walter Benjamin

"On the Mimetic Faculty" (German: Über das mimetische Vermögen) (1933) is the second of an uncompleted trilogy of essays articulating a metaphysics or post-metaphysics of language, written by Walter Benjamin in the months leading up to and immediately following the appointment of Adolf Hitler as Chancellor of Germany, the Reichstag Fire, and the inauguration of the Third Reich. It was sent as the postscript of a letter to his best friend, a Librarian of Ancient Manuscripts at Hebrew University and Master of Kabbalah in Jerusalem, Gershom Scholem.

The first entry in this cycle of reflections on cosmogenesis, anthropogenesis and language, "On Language as Such and on the Language of Man," had also been written as a letter to Scholem in the year 1916. That essay speaks of language in and as the Name of God, referring both implicitly and explicitly to the Kabbalah. The series of meditations that begins here represents a cosmology based on language with formal and rhetorical aspects that are kabbalistic in character, and is opposed from the outset to the interpretation of being and time which appears in the work of their nemesis, "the great...indeed the only great Nazi philosopher," Martin Heidegger.

"On the Mimetic Faculty" concentrates and distills certain aspects of the earlier essay but the chronological horizon of issues being considered in the text also moves back further in time. Whereas "On Language" speaks of the invention of the alphabet, and the introduction of the Name as an ontogenetic event constituting the perpetuity of human identity after death (c. 1300–1200 BCE), "On the Mimetic Faculty" moves back towards the earliest prehistoric development of human language as it arose and became increasingly distinct from gesture and pantomime (c. 30 millennia–200 millennia ago) – with areas of the essay reaching back even further than that. The piece is an attempt to "read what was never written." As Benjamin writes: "Such reading is the most ancient: reading before all languages, from the entrails, the stars and the dances."

== Summary and reception ==
In the extraordinarily compressed three or four pages of "On the Mimetic Faculty", Benjamin outlines connections between mimesis and sympathetic magic, imagining a possible origin of astrology and various other occult sciences arising from the basic ability of humans to interpret occult likeness or "non-sensuous similarity". From these non-sensuous similarities, words seem to arise. But is there a priority of language predating even the earliest human intonations? Benjamin alludes to methods of astral conjuring, a subject into which he goes into more depth in the circle of paralipomena around the text. The theme or concern of the piece that he develops is the evolutionary process by which the human capacity of mimicry both culminates in and is liquidated by language and especially in the written word.

As scholars have pointed out, "On the Mimetic Faculty" takes on a certain grim significance in the context of the Holocaust when, in the year 1941, Hitler's propaganda minister delivered an official 'mystical' or transcendent rationale for the extermination of the Jews directed toward the more elite cadres of the Nazis as the Final Solution was being scaled into industrial killing centers in the East. This essay by Propaganda Minister Josef Goebbels's essay is entitled "Mimickry". It addresses itself to a readership of men who knew that most of the blood libel propaganda in the Nazi press was composed largely of opportunistic lies deployed to motivate and unify the German masses. They were merely cynically resigned to this strategy. To rely upon them to carry out the process, however, Goebbels apparently thought they should be given some reason for killing the Jews that could not be disproven. The "Mimickry" article appeals to those men amongst the ranks in a manner that strongly resembles a rhetorically inverted form of Benjamin's essay "On the Mimetic Faculty".

Goebbels certainly wanted to touch upon the crucial point: Hatred for the Jews did not depend on questions of history or doctrine, but went back much further to the time when Homo had developed his capacity for imitation to the point of assimilating himself to his earliest enemies: predators, because [the Nazis] were themselves primordial predators. National Socialists, unlike Jews, hadn't had to imitate anyone [Goebbels implies]...

They were always and only themselves... The Nazis [saw themselves as] the belated retaliation by the animal world against the species that had violated its order; and the Jews were the elected representatives of that species... Over the centuries, the most serious and shameful accusations had been heaped on the Jews: the condemnation of Jesus, foul customs, ritual killings, usury. But now all this dissolved and a single intact and sufficient charge remained – an offense that could even be mistaken for a talent: the Jew can imitate... No more was needed to establish the age old Jewish conspiracy. Goebbels, who was a showman, understood ... the closer the 'terrible punishment' became for the Jews the more the accusation against them had to be reduced to its ultimate essence. And what could be more serious than to go back to that event, lost in the mist of prehistory? Almost everything was the consequence of it.

Goebbels's article had been released in the book Die Zeit ohne Beispiel, shortly after Benjamin's death. Nevertheless, a student, disciple, and literary executor of Benjamin's estate, Theodor Adorno, cribbed the beginning and ending movements of his masterwork The Dialectic of the Enlightenment—published in 1944 as Philosophische Fragmente while the war was still unfolding—from Benjamin's at that time still esoteric and unpublished material on language culminating in On the Mimetic Faculty, reading it against the sentiments broadcast in Goebbels's "Mimickry". The chapter on Antisemitism in the Dialectic of the Enlightenment thus represents—within this specific dimension—Benjamin's retort to Goebbels from beyond the grave in regards to Goebbel's proposal that "Mimickry" should be understood as a sufficient object cause for carrying out the extermination of the Jews, a proposal delivered during the commission of the Holocaust. Mimesis is not a specifically ‘Jewish’ ability, Benjamin's essay shows, but a human capacity.

Indeed, mimesis appears to be the trait whose hypertrophic development in the sphere of spoken and written language distinguished human beings from all other members of the animal kingdom in the first place. The Nazis, imitating the mythologically counterfeit and fictionalized Jewish council in the Protocols of the Elders of Zion in their own plots to take over the world, had themselves been pantomiming their way to power all along. The genocidal hatred of Jews within the Third Reich's inner circle, then, may be read—at least in part, as Adorno argues—as a projection and displacement of discomfort and repressive denial about the nature and source of symbolic powers and of the modes by which these symbolic powers establish themselves as nations and principalities ruling over the earth.

To a large extent, the framework described in Benjamin "On the Mimetic Faculty" finds confirmation in the Ritual/Speech Coevolution hypothesis, a major modality of the current working theory about the origin of language amongst anthropologists and linguists over the past several decades.

== Paralipomena ==
The paralipomena, or partials drafts and early alternative versions of "On the Mimetic Faculty", include:

- A Review of the Mendelssohn's Der Mensch in der Handschrift (1928),
- "Graphology Old and New" (1930),
- "On Astrology" (1932),
- "The Lamp" (1933),
- "Doctrine of the Similar" (1933),
- "Antithesis Concerning Word and Name" (1933).
