= On Language as Such and on the Language of Man =

Essay by Walter Benjamin

"On Language as Such and on the Language of Man" (German: Über Sprache überhaupt und über die Sprache des Menschen; 1916) is the first of an uncompleted trilogy of essays articulating a metaphysics or post-metaphysics of language in and as the name of God, written by Walter Benjamin, in response to a series of questions raised by Gershom Scholem in a conversation that began at a villa in the German countryside at the end of the summer in 1916. The second fragment in this trilogy is "On the Mimetic Faculty", written from exile in 1932–1933. The piece "On Language" constitutes the earliest major artifact of Benjamin's thought, preceded only by a few speeches that he'd given in the debating society of Berlin's Jewish Youth Movement, and some articles he'd written for the banned antiwar student journal Der Anfäng.

== Overview ==
The essay that became "On Language" began in draft-form as an eight-page letter that Benjamin wrote to Scholem in the autumn of 1916, though he had to break off in the midst of composition halfway through writing the piece. He gave the completed essay to Scholem in December 1916. Scholem was nineteen years old at the time; Benjamin, twenty-two years of age.

The questions provoking the essay, asked by Scholem, spring from a debate between the two young scholars earlier that August which had been concerned with how to integrate or import recent insights about the nature of spacetime in the theory of relativity into the revenant language of theology after the death of God. It opens an avenue to the recovery a lost sense of the unpronounceable Holy Name at the root of the Kabbalah, stretching down into the traditional base-layer of Hebrew scriptures in the Torah (or Five Books of Moses), where an encounter with this name is foregrounded in the theophany of Moses. The work is, in this stringently technical sense, a work of 'theurgy' (involving the knowledge, nomination, invocation and 'summoning' of spiritual beings, as opposed to thaumaturgy or the performance of miracles) though Benjamin—as Scholem later hints—eschews the schematic framework of emanationism frequently adopted in theurgic writings as well as the transcendent authority of scripture in his contribution to this field. The esoteric series of writings which begins here are a major current within the long-term correspondence between Benjamin and Scholem about the metaphysics of language and the Kabbalah which took shape from that time, continuing until the year of Benjamin's death in 1940.

== History ==
Scholem and Benjamin met in Munich and traveled together to a villa on the shore of Lake Starnberg in mid-August of 1916, while the battles of the Somme, Verdun, and the ongoing grind of combat in Ypres raged simultaneously along the Western Front not far from their meeting place near Seeshaupt in the Bavarian countryside. The two arrived at the villa soaked to the bone. "By the time we arrived we still had half an hour's walk in the pouring rain ahead of us." There they met Dora Pollak née Kellner, whose husband—the son of a wealthy Jewish industrialist, journalist Max Pollak—was according to an obviously "fictional conceit" (per Scholem) supposed to be away on business. In fact Pollak and Dora were in the process of divorcing. Benjamin would marry Dora the following year.

The third member of this party at the villa, Dora Sophie Kellner was, incidentally, the daughter of Leon Kellner, a secretary, emissary, translator and right-hand man of the founder of Zionism and the "hallowed" feuilleton editor of the major fin-de-siecle Vienna newspaper, Neue Freie Presse--Theodor Herzl. Leon Kellner was "the executor of Herzl's diary and the publisher of his collected works," as Scholem remarked at the time. This elder Kellner, in particular, distinguished himself by advocating for the reintroduction of ancient Hebrew as the language of Jewish settlements in Palestine: a provision that found its realization in the years to come. His daughter, soon-to-be Benjamin's wife, becomes a translator and actor in Jewish history in her own right. Her patrimony is mentioned here in passing insofar as it bears on the theme of the essay and to Benjamin and Scholem's larger project insofar as the incarnation and reincarnations of language, and of the Hebrew in particular, become one of the long-term themes of Benjamin and Scholem's pairing on the metaphysics of language and the Holy Name.

"On Language as Such, and the Language of Man" is effectively the inaugural document in this discussion, which arises from the meeting at the villa in Seeshaupt. It commemorates this moment by opening the field of concerns that would constitute the esoteric terrain of Scholem's research over the following sixty years, and also had a determining influence on Benjamin's development up to his early death. "On Language" involves a deep reading of the first chapters of Book of Genesis, trading heavily on archaic philology of Hebrew, ethnographies of the period, and new visions of post-theistic ontology and the theory of categories encountered in researches embarked from the seminar of Doktor Heinrich Rickert that Benjamin attended with Martin Heidegger, along two major works of a certain strain of mystical, occult research in the 19th-century: The Philosophy of History by Franz Molitor and the Theory of Sacrifice by Franz von Baader. Despite their titles, these works (especially Molitor's) are largely preoccupied with deciphering the mysteries of the Kabbalah.

From the outset of the discourse, the work of Martin Heidegger, who is to become "the great...indeed the only great Nazi philosopher", is identified as a nemesis figure and adversarial döppelganger or antagonist in the project embarked upon by both Benjamin and Scholem in the summer 1916. Heidegger is sighted and marked as one who is carrying out the research in the same territory, but in an inverted spirit of German idealism cum militant German nihilism, whose political expression is National Socialism ("the revolution of nihilism") as opposed to the spirit of the Kabbalah and weak Messianism in Scholem and Benjamin's work. As Scholem writes, "One may say, perhaps, the Messianic idea is the real anti-existentialist idea," referring to the style of thinking propagated based on Heidegger's work, which comes to bear the name 'existentialism.' Their discussion may be read as an esoteric Jewish mystical alternative to Martin Heidegger's discourse on being, will, and becoming whose ascendancy in esteem during the coming decades would parallel and correlate with the rise of the Third Reich, even as Scholem and Benjamin's work was to be written under its shadow.

== Summary ==
The most authoritative and concise statement condensing the contents of the work appears in Scholem's late reflections on theology. Benjamin's essay on language unfolds

a specific affinity between Creation and Revelation since both were conceived of as the language in which divine being communicated. And it was the Kabbalists who regarded rational thinking as a linguistic process…the [universally, cosmically] creative impetus is of a linguistic nature, that, therefore, an infinite multitude of languages suffuses the world, [thus] all structures we discover in it have a tendency toward language."

The text, in this sense, "appears as a texture woven from the Name of God."

== See also ==
- Kabbalah
- Ein Sof
- The Theory of Relativity
- The Death of God
- Gershom Scholem
- Walter Benjamin
- The Origin of German Tragic Drama
- Philosophy of history
