= Walter Benjamin =

German cultural critic, philosopher and social critic (1892–1940)

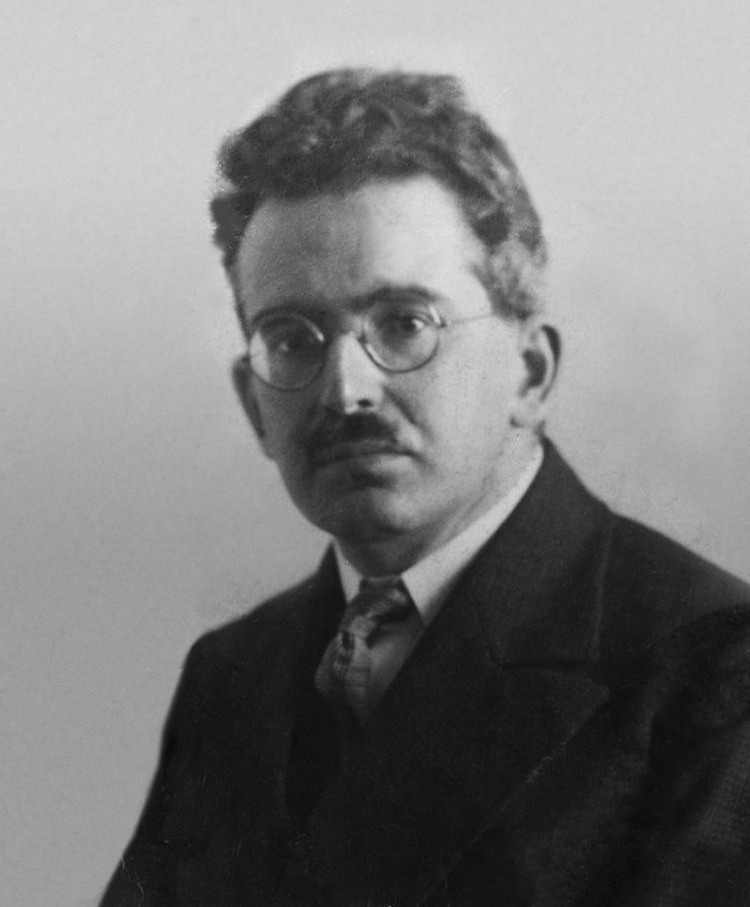
- Benjamin in 1928
- Born: Walter Bendix Schönflies Benjamin; 15 July 1892; Berlin, German Empire
- Died: 26 September 1940 (aged 48); Portbou, Catalonia, Francoist Spain
- Cause of death: Suicide by morphine overdose

Education
- Education: University of Freiburg; Friedrich Wilhelm University of Berlin; University of Bern (PhD, 1919); University of Frankfurt am Main (Habil. cand.)
- Doctoral advisor: Richard Herbertz
- Other advisors: Heinrich Rickert; Georg Simmel

Philosophical work
- Era: 20th-century philosophy
- Region: Western philosophy
- School: Continental philosophy Western Marxism; Marxist hermeneutics College of Sociology
- Institutions: University of Frankfurt am Main
- Main interests: Literary theory, aesthetics, philosophy of technology, epistemology, philosophy of language, philosophy of history
- Notable ideas: Auratic perception, State of exception, aestheticization of politics, dialectical image, the flâneur

Walter Bendix Schönflies Benjamin (/ˈbɛnjəmɪn/ BEN-yə-min; German: [ˈvaltɐ ˈbɛnjamiːn]; 15 July 1892 – 26 September 1940) was a German philosopher, cultural critic, media theorist, and essayist. An eclectic thinker who combined elements of German idealism, Jewish mysticism, Western Marxism, and post-Kantianism, he made contributions to the philosophy of history, metaphysics, historical materialism, criticism, and aesthetics, and had an oblique but overwhelmingly influential impact on the resurrection of the Kabbalah by virtue of his life-long epistolary relationship with Gershom Scholem.

In popular culture and left-wing journalism he often appears as an exemplar whose experience is representative of the tragedy of German Jewish intellectuals under Nazi Germany.

Of the hidden principle organizing Walter Benjamin's thought Scholem wrote unequivocally that "Benjamin was a philosopher", while his younger colleagues Hannah Arendt and Theodor W. Adorno contend that he was "not a philosopher". Scholem remarked that "The peculiar aura of authority emanating from his work tended to incite contradiction".

He was associated with the Frankfurt School and also maintained formative relationships with thinkers and cultural figures such as playwright Bertolt Brecht (friend), Martin Buber (early patron), Nazi constitutionalist Carl Schmitt (rival), and many others. He was related to German political theorist and philosopher Arendt through her first marriage to Benjamin's cousin Günther Anders, though his friendship with her flowered in Paris after she separated from Anders. Both Arendt and Anders were students of Martin Heidegger, whom Benjamin considered a nemesis.

Among Benjamin's best known works are the essays "The Work of Art in the Age of Mechanical Reproduction" (1935) and "Theses on the Philosophy of History" (1940). His major work as a critic included essays on Kafka, Baudelaire, Goethe, Kraus, Leskov, Proust, Walser, Trauerspiel and translation theory. He translated the Tableaux Parisiens section of Baudelaire's Les Fleurs du mal and parts of Proust's À la recherche du temps perdu.

In 1940, at the age of 48, Benjamin died during his flight into exile at Portbou on the French–Spanish border while attempting to escape the advance of the Third Reich. Having remained in Europe until it was too late, as Cynthia Ozick puts it, Benjamin took his own life to avoid being murdered as a Jew. "Impressed and shaken by his death, the Spanish authorities allowed Benjamin's companions to continue their travel" into Spain, by which route they were able to escape the Third Reich.

Though popular acclaim eluded him during his life, the decades following his death won his work posthumous renown. Some German readers and academics encountered Benjamin after his Complete Works began to be released by Suhrkamp Verlag in 1955, but global acclaim came to him when his works were translated into English and introduced to a reading public in the Anglosphere by Arendt in 1968.

== Life ==
=== Early life and education ===
Walter Benjamin and his younger siblings, Georg (1895–1942) and Dora (1901–1946), were born to a wealthy business family of assimilated Ashkenazi Jews in Berlin, then the capital of the German Empire. Walter's father, Emil Benjamin, was a banker in Paris who had relocated from France to Germany, where he worked as an antiques trader and art dealer; marrying Pauline Schönflies. He owned a number of investments in Berlin, including ice skating rinks.

Walter's uncle, William Stern, was a prominent German child psychologist who developed the concept of the intelligence quotient (IQ). He also had a cousin, Günther Anders, a German philosopher and anti-nuclear activist who studied under Edmund Husserl and Martin Heidegger. Through his mother, Walter's great-uncle was the classical archaeologist Gustav Hirschfeld.

In 1901, the eight-year-old Walter was enrolled at the Kaiser Friedrich School in Charlottenburg; he completed his secondary school studies ten years later. In his youth, Walter was of fragile health and so in 1905 the family sent him to Hermann-Lietz-Schule Haubinda, part of the German rural boarding school movement in the Thuringian countryside, for two years; in 1907, having returned to Berlin, he resumed his schooling at the Kaiser Friedrich School.

In 1912, at the age of 20, he enrolled at the University of Freiburg, but at the summer semester's end, he returned to Berlin and matriculated at the Friedrich Wilhelm University of Berlin to continue studying philosophy. There, Benjamin had his first exposure to Zionism, which had not been part of his liberal upbringing. This gave him occasion to formulate his own ideas about the meaning of Judaism. Benjamin distanced himself from political and nationalist Zionism, instead developing in his own thinking what he called a kind of "cultural Zionism"—an attitude that recognized and promoted Judaism and Jewish ethics. In Benjamin's formulation, his Jewishness meant a commitment to the furtherance of European culture. He wrote: "My life experience led me to this insight: the Jews represent an elite in the ranks of the spiritually active ... For Judaism is to me in no sense an end in itself, but the most distinguished bearer and representative of the spiritual." This was a position Benjamin largely held throughout his life.

It was as a speaker and debater in the milieu of the Gustav Wyneken's German Youth Movement that Benjamin was first encountered by Gershom Scholem and later Martin Buber, although he had parted ways with the youth group before they had become properly acquainted. Elected president of the Freie Studentenschaft (Free Students Association), Benjamin wrote essays arguing for educational and general cultural change while working alongside Wyneken at the legendary and controversial youth magazine Der Anfang (The beginning), that was banned in all schools in Bavaria. Wyneken's thesis that a new youth must pave the way for revolutionary cultural change became the main theme of all of Benjamin's publications at that time. When he was not reelected as student association president, he returned to Freiburg to study, with particular attention to the lectures of Heinrich Rickert; at that time he traveled to France and Italy.

Benjamin's attempt to volunteer for service at the outbreak of World War I in August 1914 was rejected by the army. He later feigned illnesses to avoid conscription, allowing him to continue his studies and his translations of works by French poet Charles Baudelaire. His conspicuous refuge in Switzerland on dubious medical grounds was a likely factor in his ongoing challenges in obtaining academic employment after the war.

The next year, 1915, Benjamin moved to Munich and continued his schooling at the Ludwig-Maximilians-Universität München, where he met Rainer Maria Rilke and Scholem; the latter became a lifelong friend. Intensive discussions with Scholem about Judaism and Jewish mysticism gave the impetus for the 1916 text (surviving as a manuscript) Über Sprache überhaupt und über die Sprache des Menschen ("On Language as Such and on the Language of Man"), which, as Benjamin said to Scholem, "has an immanent relationship to Judaism and to the first chapter of the Genesis". In that period, Benjamin wrote about the 18th-century Romantic German poet Friedrich Hölderlin.

In 1917 Benjamin transferred to the University of Bern; there he met Ernst Bloch, and Dora Sophie Pollak (née Kellner), whom he married. They had a son, Stefan Rafael, in 1918. In 1919 Benjamin earned his PhD summa cum laude with the dissertation Der Begriff der Kunstkritik in der deutschen Romantik (The Concept of Art Criticism in German Romanticism).

For his postdoctoral thesis in 1920, Benjamin hit upon an idea very similar to the thesis proposed by Martin Heidegger in the latter's own postdoctoral project (Duns Scotus: Theory of Categories and Meaning). Wolfram Eilenberger writes that Benjamin's plan was "to legitimize [his theory of language] with reference to a largely forgotten tradition [found in the archaic writings of Duns Scotus], and to strike the sparks of systematization from the apparent disjunct among modern, logical, and analytical linguistic philosophy and medieval speculations on language that fell under the heading of theology". After Scholem sympathetically informed his friend that his interest in the concept had been pre-empted by Heidegger's earlier publication, Benjamin seemed to have derived a lifelong antagonism toward the rival philosopher whose major insights, over the course of both of their careers, sometimes overlapped and sometimes conflicted with Benjamin's.

Later, unable to support himself and family, Benjamin returned to Berlin and resided with his parents. In 1921 he published the essay "Zur Kritik der Gewalt" ("Toward the Critique of Violence"). At this time Benjamin first became socially acquainted with Leo Strauss, and he remained an admirer of Strauss and his work throughout his life.

=== Friendships ===
Starting in adolescence, in a trend of episodic behavior that was to remain true throughout his life, Benjamin was a maven within an important community during a critically important historical period: the left-intelligentsia of interwar Berlin and Paris. Acquaintance with Walter Benjamin was a connecting thread for a variety of major figures in metaphysics, philosophy, theology, the visual arts, theater, literature, radio, politics and various other domains. Benjamin happened to be present on the outskirts of many of the most important events within the intellectual ferment of the interwar-period in Weimar Germany and interpreted those events in his writing.

He once took a class on the Maya civilization from Rainer Maria Rilke. He attended the same seminar as Heidegger at Freiburg in the summer of 1913 when both men were still university students: concepts first encountered there influenced their thought for the remainder of their careers. He was an early draft script reader, comrade, favorable critic and promoter as well as a frequent house-guest of writer and theater director Bertolt Brecht. Martin Buber took an interest in Benjamin, but Benjamin declined to contribute to Buber's journal because it was too esoteric. Nevertheless, Buber financed Benjamin's trip to Moscow and promoted his career in other ways. Buber commissioned Benjamin to write an article for his Die Kreatur, though Benjamin missed his deadline for the delivery of this piece by several years.

Benjamin was a close colleague of Ernst Bloch while Bloch was writing the Spirit of Utopia and maintained a relationship with him until the late 20's that Bloch later described as "almost too close." An untitled scrap omitted from Benjamin's book review of Bloch's Spirit of Utopia which remained unpublished during Benjamin's lifetime (later anthologized under the title "Theologico-Political Fragment") is now perhaps better remembered than the larger work it cites as an authority for its mystical reflections. It was Bloch's commission that inspired Benjamin's work on the theory of categories, according to Scholem. This was to be a consequential theme throughout his career.

One of Benjamin's high-school best friends (also a German Jew) killed himself using gas at the outbreak of the first World War; another was one of the Jewish Liaisons who took Nazi diplomats on a tour of Palestine. This happened while the Third Reich was preparing the European Zionists to believe that Europe's Jews would be forcibly emigrated from the Reich, to deflect attention from the looming possibility of mass extermination. Scholem, Benjamin's oldest friend, and the sole executor of his literary estate, would resurrect the canonical books of the Kabbalah from private libraries and ancient document dumps called Genizah. These were created when the books flooded into Mandatory Palestine during the period leading up to, coinciding with, and immediately following the Holocaust.

=== Career ===
In 1923, when the Institute for Social Research was founded, later to become home to the Frankfurt School, Benjamin published Charles Baudelaire, Tableaux Parisiens. At this time he became acquainted with Theodor W. Adorno and befriended György Lukács, whose The Theory of the Novel (1920) influenced him. Meanwhile, hyperinflation in the Weimar Republic after the war made it difficult for Emil Benjamin to continue supporting his son's family. At the end of 1923 Scholem emigrated to Palestine; despite repeated invitations, he failed to persuade Benjamin (and family) to follow him.

In 1924 Hugo von Hofmannsthal, in the Neue Deutsche Beiträge magazine, published Benjamin's "Goethes Wahlverwandtschaften" ("Goethe's Elective Affinities"), about Goethe's third novel, Die Wahlverwandtschaften (1809). According to literary critic Burkhardt Lindner, the essay forms the "third major philosophical-aesthetic treatise of the early work" alongside the PhD dissertation and the habilitation thesis. It has often been linked to the breakup of his marriage; the dedication to Julia Cohn, whom he had courted in vain at the time, suggests this. According to Hannah Arendt, this essay ruined Benjamin's only chance of a university career. Benjamin's Goethe monograph is partly a meditation on the form 'free-love' that the Benjamins were experimenting with in their marriage at this time, amongst other things. But this was only tangential to the issue that led to the controversy to which Arendt refers. His mistake (per Arendt) was killing a sacred cow from amongst the academic establishment. As so often in Benjamin's writings, his study of Goethe's Elective Affinities was marked by polemics and the theme of his assault in this work concerned Friedrich Gundolf's Goethe book. Gundolf was the most prominent and able academic member of the George-Kreis – a cult of post-symbolist, romantic nationalist poets with a mystically conservative, medievalist bent. Elsewhere, in the anonymity of his private epistolary writings, Benjamin explicitly points out how (regardless of the ultimate horror, withdrawal and rejection with which members of the circle greeted the Nazi regime) this group's commitment to particular archaic styles anticipated the aesthetics of fascism.

Later that year Benjamin and Bloch resided on the Italian island of Capri; Benjamin wrote Ursprung des deutschen Trauerspiels (The Origin of German Tragic Drama) as a habilitation thesis meant to qualify him as a tenured university professor in Germany.

At Bloch's suggestion, he read Lukács's History and Class Consciousness (1923). He also met the Latvian Bolshevik and actress Asja Lācis, then residing in Moscow; he became her lover and she was a lasting intellectual influence on him.

A year later, in 1925, Benjamin withdrew The Origin of German Tragic Drama as his possible qualification for the habilitation teaching credential at the University of Frankfurt am Main, fearing its possible rejection. The work was a study in which he sought to "save" the category of allegory. It proved too unorthodox and abstruse for its examiners, who included prominent members of the humanities faculty, such as Hans Cornelius. Max Horkheimer also sat on the panel of examiners who rejected Benjamin's thesis. Horkheimer later served as both patron and promoter of Benjamin's work at the Institute for Social Research and is best remembered as the co-author of Benjamin's closest disciple Theodor Adorno's magnum opus, the Dialectic of the Enlightenment (a book which cribs heavily from Benjamin's unpublished, esoteric writings in many of its most important passages). In the case of Benjamin's habilitation, however, Horkheimer presents a united front with Cornelius and Professor Schultz in asking Benjamin to withdraw his application for the habilitation to avoid disgrace on the occasion of the examination. That is to say: His committee informed him that he will not be accepted as an academic instructor in the German university system.

A diagram of the internecine dynamics of Benjamin's habilitation committee's rejection of his work bear recollection here, as they determine something of the character of his later career and ultimate legacy. Hans Cornelius had been Adorno's mentor in the institutional context of the university, whereas once Adorno started actually teaching as a professor at the University of Frankfurt am Main, he devoted his seminars to Benjamin's rejected work. Adorno's 1931 and 1932 seminars, delivered at the University of Frankfurt am Main, devoted themselves to a close reading of The Origin of German Tragic Drama. Adorno was still teaching this class on The Origin of German Tragic Drama during the winter semester that Adolf Hitler came to power, although at that time it was not listed in the course catalog – whereas Adorno's academic mentor Cornelius, who had rejected this thesis, is today remembered primarily because of his rejection of Benjamin's habilitation. Max Horkheimer becomes a footnote to the career of Benjamin's apprentice. Schultz – the other member of Benjamin's committee who seems to have directed him to the subject of Baroque drama in the first place, only to reject the thesis that derived from this recommendation – is virtually altogether forgotten. The episode in the history of the German academy is immortalized in the bon mot, "One cannot habilitate intellect."

This failure resulted in his father's refusal to continue to support him financially, so that Benjamin was forced to make ends meet as a professional critic and occasional translator. Working with Franz Hessel he translated the first volumes of Marcel Proust's À la Recherche du Temps Perdu (In Search of Lost Time). The next year, 1926, he began writing for the German newspapers Frankfurter Zeitung and Die Literarische Welt (The Literary World); that paid enough for him to reside in Paris for some months. In December 1926, the year his father died, Benjamin went to Moscow to meet Lācis and found her ill in a sanatorium.

During his stay in Moscow, he was asked by the editorial board of the Great Soviet Encyclopedia to write an article on Goethe. Benjamin's article was ultimately rejected, with reviewer Anatoly Lunacharsky (then the People's Commissar of Education) characterizing it as "non-encyclopedic", and only a small part of the text prepared by Benjamin was included in the encyclopedia. During Benjamin's lifetime, the article was not published in its entirety. A Russian translation of the article was published in the Russian edition of "The Work of Art in the Age of Mechanical Reproduction" in 1996.

In 1927, he began Das Passagen-Werk (The Arcades Project), his uncompleted magnum opus, a study of 19th-century Parisian life. The same year, he saw Scholem in Berlin, for the last time, and considered emigrating from Germany to Palestine. In 1928, he and Dora separated (they divorced two years later, in 1930); in the same year he published Einbahnstraße (One-Way Street), and a revision of his habilitation thesis Ursprung des Deutschen Trauerspiels (The Origin of German Tragic Drama). In 1929 Berlin, Lācis, then an assistant to Bertolt Brecht, socially presented the intellectuals to each other. In that time, Benjamin also briefly embarked upon an academic career, as an instructor at Heidelberg University.

=== Exile and death ===
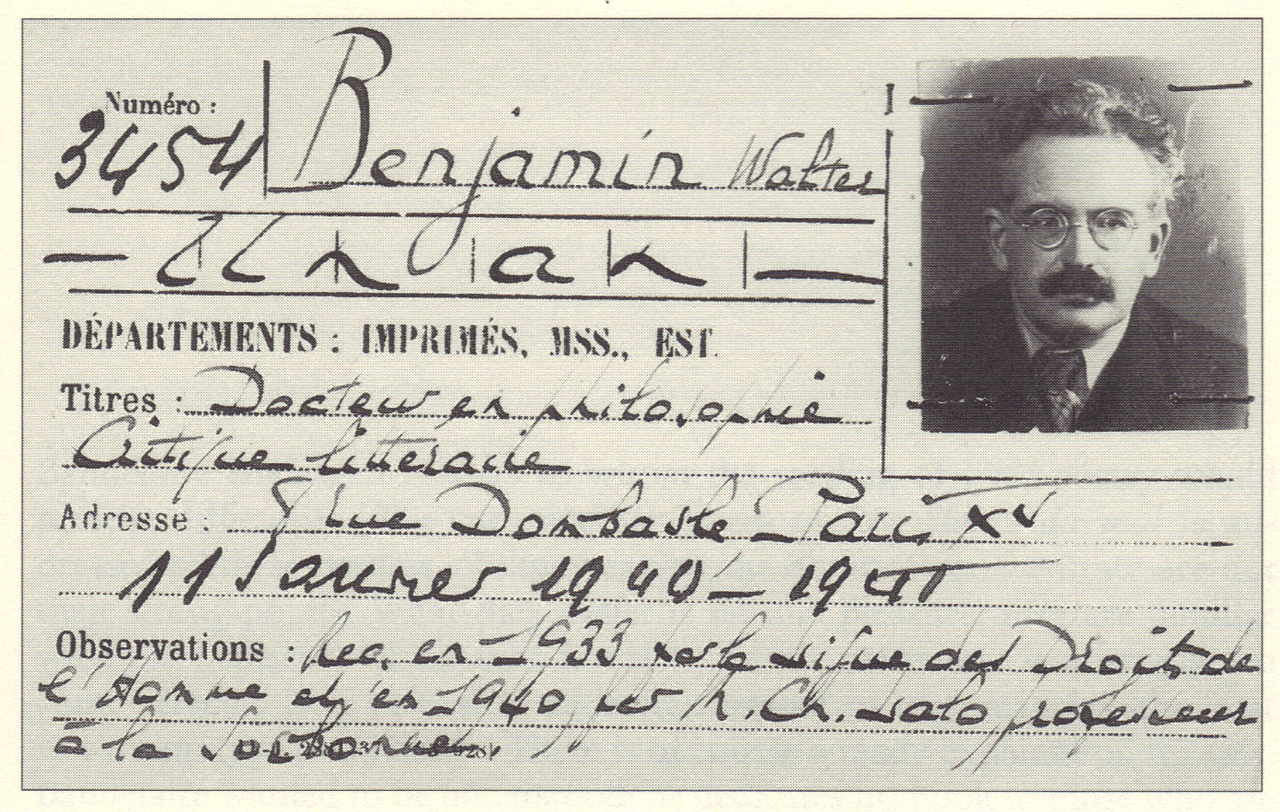
Walter Benjamin's membership card for the Bibliothèque nationale de France (1940)

In 1932, during the turmoil preceding Adolf Hitler's assumption of the office of Chancellor of Germany, Benjamin left Germany temporarily for the Spanish island of Ibiza where he stayed for some months; he then moved to Nice, where he considered suicide. Identifying the Reichstag fire on 27 February 1933 and its aftermath as marking the de facto Nazi assumption of full power in Germany, then manifest with the subsequent persecution of the Jews, he permanently left Germany in September. After seeking shelter in Svendborg, Denmark, at Bertolt Brecht's house, and at Sanremo, Italy, where his ex-wife Dora lived, he moved to Paris.

As he ran out of money, Benjamin collaborated with Horkheimer, and received funds from the Institute for Social Research, later going permanently into exile. In Paris, he met other refugee German artists and intellectuals, befriending Arendt, novelist Hermann Hesse, and composer Kurt Weill. In 1936, a first version of "The Work of Art in the Age of Mechanical Reproduction" (originally written in German in 1935) was published in French ("L'œuvre d'art à l'époque de sa reproduction méchanisée") by Horkheimer in the Zeitschrift für Sozialforschung journal of the Institute for Social Research. It was a critique of the authenticity of mass-produced art; he wrote that a mechanically produced copy of an artwork can be taken somewhere the original could never have gone, arguing that the presence of the original is "prerequisite to the concept of authenticity".

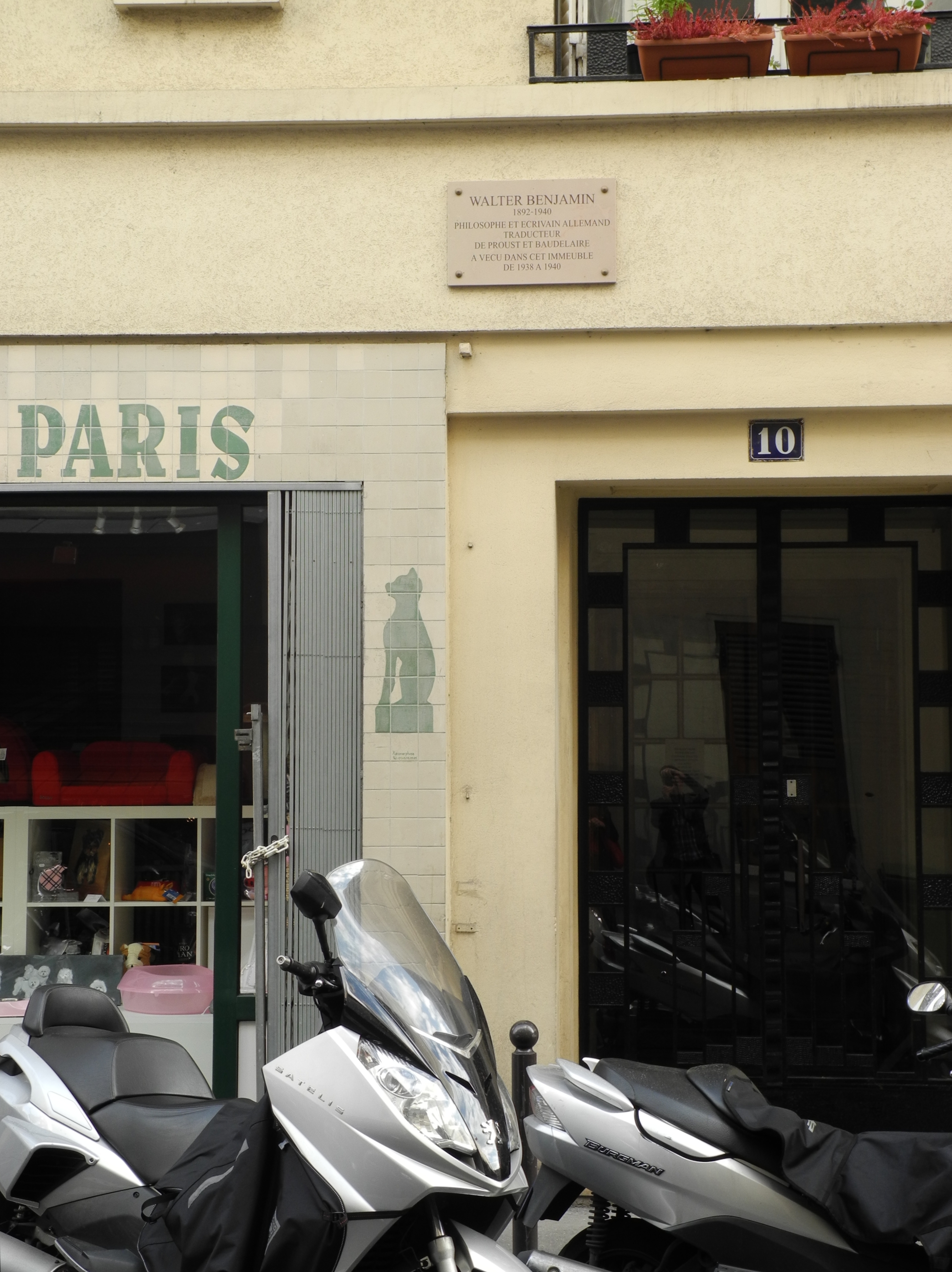
Walter Benjamin's Paris apartment at 10 rue Dombasle (1938–1940)

In 1937 Benjamin worked on "Das Paris des Second Empire bei Baudelaire" ("The Paris of the Second Empire in Baudelaire"), met Georges Bataille (to whom he later entrusted the Arcades Project manuscript), and joined the College of Sociology (which he would criticize for its "pre-fascist aestheticism"). In 1938 he paid his last visit to Brecht in Denmark. Meanwhile, the Nazi régime had stripped German Jews of their citizenship; now stateless, Benjamin was arrested by the French government and incarcerated for three months in a prison camp near Nevers.

Returning to Paris in January 1940, he drafted "Über den Begriff der Geschichte" ("On the Concept of History", later published as "Theses on the Philosophy of History"). While the Wehrmacht was pushing back the French Army, on 13 June Benjamin and his sister fled Paris to Lourdes, just a day before the Germans entered the capital with orders to arrest him at his flat. In August, he obtained a travel visa to the United States that Horkheimer had negotiated for him. In eluding the Gestapo, Benjamin planned to travel to the US from neutral Portugal, which he expected to reach via Francoist Spain, then ostensibly a neutral country.

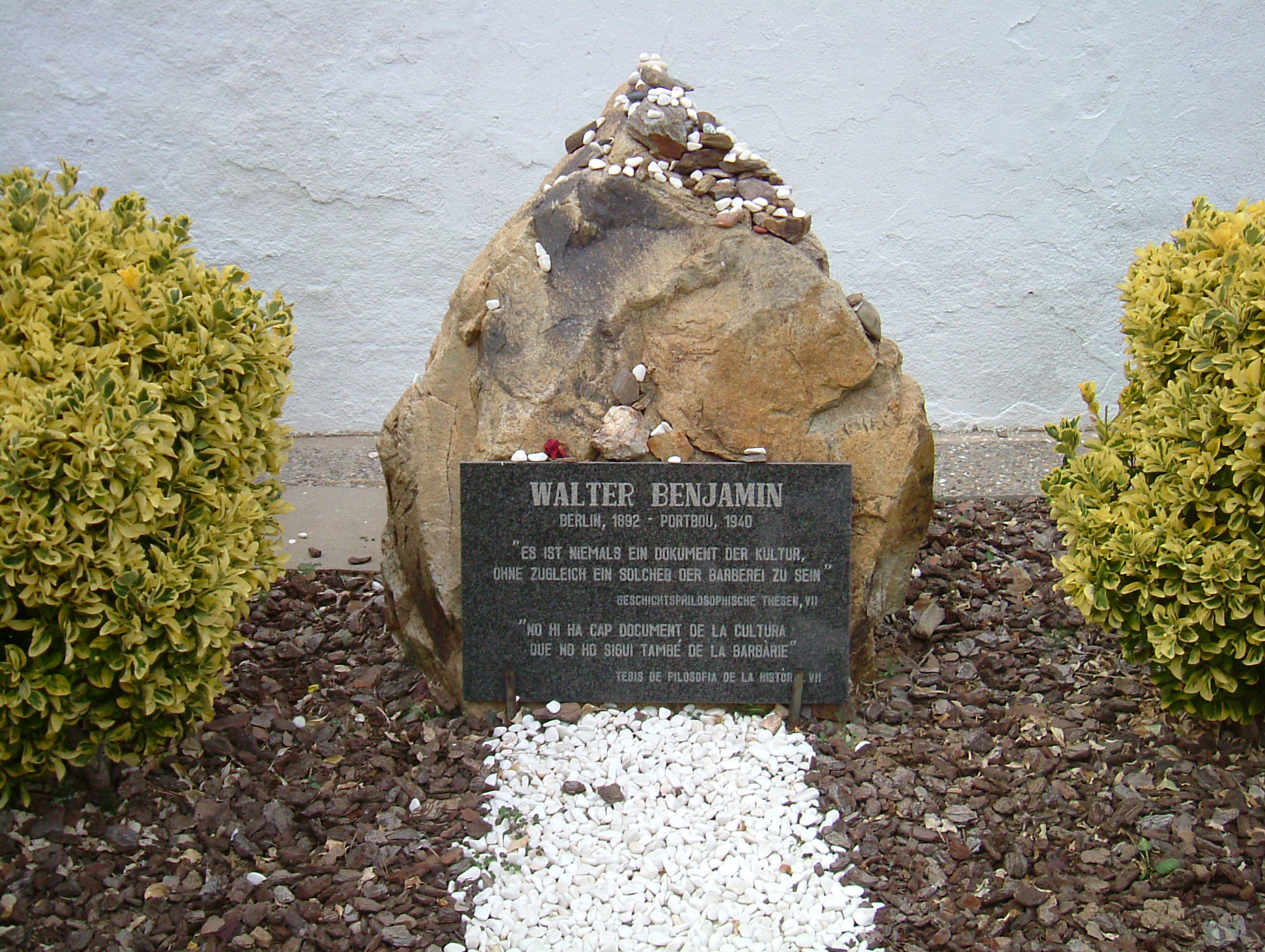
Walter Benjamin's grave in Portbou. The epitaph in German, repeated in Catalan, quotes from Section 7 of "Theses on the Philosophy of History": "There is no document of culture which is not at the same time a document of barbarism"

The historical record indicates that he safely crossed the French–Spanish border and arrived at the coastal town of Portbou in Catalonia on 25 September 1940. The Franco government had cancelled all transit visas and ordered the Spanish police to return such persons to France, including the Jewish refugee group Benjamin had joined. They were told by the Spanish police that they would be deported back to France the next day, which would have thwarted Benjamin's plans to travel to the US. Expecting repatriation to Nazi hands, Benjamin overdosed on morphine tablets that night while staying at the Hotel de Francia; the official Portbou register records 26 September as his date of death. Benjamin, unknown to anyone in Portbou, was buried in a common grave in the municipal cemetery, along with nameless refugees, homeless people, and unidentified bodies. Benjamin's colleague Arthur Koestler, also fleeing Europe, attempted suicide by taking some of the morphine tablets, but survived. Benjamin's brother Georg was killed at the Mauthausen-Gusen concentration camp in 1942.

The others in his party were allowed passage the next day, possibly because Benjamin's suicide had shocked the Spanish officials, and safely reached Lisbon on 30 September. Arendt, who crossed the French-Spanish border at Portbou a few months later, passed the manuscript of Theses to Adorno. Another completed manuscript, which Benjamin had carried in his suitcase, disappeared after his death and has not been recovered.

== Thought ==
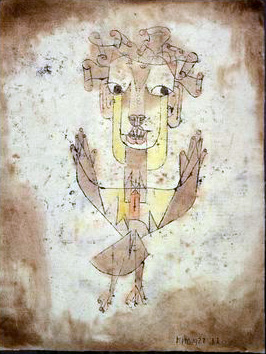
Paul Klee's 1920 painting Angelus Novus, which Benjamin bought in 1921 and compared to "the angel of history" in "Theses on the Philosophy of History"

In addition to his lifelong dialogue in letters with Gershom Scholem, Walter Benjamin maintained an intense correspondence with Theodor Adorno and Bertolt Brecht, and was occasionally funded by the Frankfurt School under the direction of Adorno and Horkheimer, even from their New York City residence. At other times he received funding from the Hebrew University of Jerusalem or from funds made available by Martin Buber and his publishing associates, including Salman Schocken.

The dynamism or conflict between these competing influences—Brecht's Marxism, Adorno's critical theory, Scholem's Jewish mysticism—were central to his work, although their philosophic differences remained unresolved. Moreover, the critic Paul de Man argued that the intellectual range of Benjamin's writings flows dynamically among those three intellectual traditions, deriving a critique via juxtaposition; the exemplary synthesis is "Theses on the Philosophy of History". At least one scholar, historian of religion Jason Josephson-Storm, has argued that Benjamin's diverse interests may be understood in part by understanding the influence of Western Esotericism on Benjamin.

Some of Benjamin's key ideas were adapted from occultists and New Age figures including Eric Gutkind and Ludwig Klages, and his interest in esotericism is known to have extended far beyond the Jewish Kabbalah. In addition to Brecht's Marxism, Adorno's critical theory, and Scholem's Jewish mysticism, Howard Eiland and Michael W. Jennings have underscored the importance of Karl Korsch's interpretation of Capital to understanding Benjamin's engagement with Marxism in later works like the Arcades. Karl Korsch's Karl Marx, which was "one of Benjamin's main sources [on]... Marxism," introduced him "to an advanced understanding of Marxism."

=== "Theses on the Philosophy of History" ===
"Theses on the Philosophy of History" is often cited as Benjamin's last complete work, having been completed, according to Adorno, in the spring of 1940. The Institute for Social Research, which had relocated to New York, published Theses in Benjamin's memory in 1942. Margaret Cohen writes in the Cambridge Companion to Walter Benjamin:

In the "Concept of History" Benjamin also turned to Jewish mysticism for a model of praxis in dark times, inspired by the kabbalistic precept that the work of the holy man is an activity known as tikkun. According to the kabbalah, God's attributes were once held in vessels whose glass was contaminated by the presence of evil and these vessels had consequently shattered, disseminating their contents to the four corners of the earth. Tikkun was the process of collecting the scattered fragments in the hopes of once more piecing them together. Benjamin fused tikkun with the Surrealist notion that liberation would come through releasing repressed collective material, to produce his celebrated account of the revolutionary historiographer, who sought to grab hold of elided memories as they sparked to view at moments of present danger.

In the essay, Benjamin's famed ninth thesis struggles to reconcile the idea of progress in the present with the apparent chaos of the past:

A Klee painting named Angelus Novus shows an angel looking as though he is about to move away from something he is fixedly contemplating. His eyes are staring, his mouth is open, his wings are spread. This is how one pictures the angel of history. His face is turned toward the past. Where we perceive a chain of events, he sees one single catastrophe which keeps piling wreckage upon wreckage and hurls it in front of his feet. The angel would like to stay, awaken the dead, and make whole what has been smashed. But a storm is blowing from Paradise; it has got caught in his wings with such violence that the angel can no longer close them. The storm irresistibly propels him into the future to which his back is turned, while the pile of debris before him grows skyward. This storm is what we call progress.

The final paragraph about the Jewish quest for the Messiah provides a final point to Benjamin's work, with its themes of culture, destruction, Jewish heritage and the fight between humanity and nihilism. He brings up the interdiction, in some varieties of Judaism, of attempts to determine the year when the Messiah would come into the world, and points out that this did not make Jews indifferent to the future "for every second of time was the strait gate through which the Messiah might enter".

=== "The Work of Art in the Age of Mechanical Reproduction" ===
Perhaps Walter Benjamin's best-known essay, "The Work of Art in the Age of Mechanical Reproduction," identifies the perceptual shift that takes place when technological advancements emphasize speed and reproducibility. Benjamin argues that the aura is found in a work of art that contains presence. The aura is precisely what cannot be reproduced in a work of art: its original presence in time and space. He suggests a work of art's aura is in a state of decay because it is becoming more and more difficult to apprehend the time and space in which a piece of art is created.

This essay also introduces the concept of the optical unconscious, a concept that identifies the subject's ability to identify desire in visual objects. This also leads to the ability to perceive information by habit instead of rapt attention.

=== The Origin of German Tragic Drama ===
Ursprung des deutschen Trauerspiels (The Origin of German Tragic Drama, 1928), is a critical study of German baroque drama, as well as the political and cultural climate of Germany during the Counter-Reformation (1545–1648). Benjamin presented the work to the University of Frankfurt am Main in 1925 as the postdoctoral dissertation meant to earn him the habilitation (qualification) to become a university instructor in Germany.

Professor Schultz of the University of Frankfurt am Main found The Origin of German Tragic Drama inappropriate for his Germanistik department (Department of German Language and Literature), and passed it to the Department of Aesthetics, the readers of which likewise dismissed Benjamin's work. The university officials recommended that Benjamin withdraw Ursprung des deutschen Trauerspiels as a habilitation thesis to avoid formal rejection and public embarrassment. He heeded the advice, and three years later, in 1928, he published The Origin of German Tragic Drama as a book.

=== One Way Street ===
Einbahnstraße (One Way Street, 1928) is a series of meditations written primarily during the same phase as The Origin of German Tragic Drama, after Benjamin had met Asja Lācis on the beach at Capri in 1924. He finished the cycle in 1926, and put it out the same year that his failed thesis was published.

One Way Street is a collage work. Critic Greil Marcus compares certain formal qualities of the book to the graphic novel Hundred Headless Women by Max Ernst, or to Walter Ruttman's The Weekend (an early sound collage film). The book avoids "all semblance of linear-narrative...[offering] a jumble of sixty apparently autonomous short prose pieces: aphorisms, jokes, dream protocols, cityscapes, landscapes, and mindscapes; portions of writing manuals, trenchant contemporary political analysis; prescient appreciations of the child's psychology, behavior, and moods; decodings of bourgeois fashion, living arrangements and courtship patterns; and time and again, remarkable penetrations into the heart of every day things, what Benjamin would later call a mode of empathy with 'the soul of the commodity'" according to Michael Jennings in his introduction to the work. He continues: "Many of the pieces...first appeared in the feuilleton section," of newspapers and magazines which was "not a separate section but rather an area at the bottom of every page...and the spatial restrictions of the feuilleton played a decisive role in shaping the prose form on which the book is based."

Written contemporaneously with Martin Heidegger's Being & Time, Benjamin's work from this period explores much of the same territory: formally in his "Epistemo-Critical Prologue" to The Origin of German Tragic Drama, and as sketches, allusions and asides in One Way Street.

=== The Arcades Project ===
The Passagenwerk (Arcades Project, 1927–40) was Benjamin's final, incomplete book about Parisian city life in the 19th century, especially about the Passages couverts de Paris—the covered passages that extended the culture of flânerie (idling and people-watching) when inclement weather made flânerie infeasible in the boulevards and streets proper. In this work Benjamin uses his fragmentary style to write about the rise of modern European urban culture. Several of the major published works that appeared in his lifetime—"The Work of Art in the Age of Mechanical Reproduction", "Paris, The Capital of the 19th Century", and his late essays and monograph on Baudelaire—are fragments of the book that he developed as standalone pieces for publication.

The Arcades Project, in its current form, brings together a massive collection of notes Benjamin filed together from 1927 to 1940.

The Arcades Project was published for the first time in 1982, and is over a thousand pages long.

=== Writing style ===
Scholem said of Benjamin's prose: "Among the peculiarities of Benjamin's philosophical prose—the critical and metaphysical prose, in which the Marxist element constitutes something like an inversion of the metaphysical-theological—is its enormous suitability for canonization; I might almost say for quotation as a kind of Holy Writ." Scholem's commentary on this phenomenon continues at length. Briefly: Benjamin's texts have an occult quality in the sense that passages appearing quite lucid today may seem impenetrable later, and elements that read as indecipherable or incoherent now may read as transparently obvious upon later revisitation.

Susan Sontag said that in Benjamin's writing, sentences did not originate ordinarily, do not progress into one another, and delineate no obvious line of reasoning, as if each sentence "had to say everything, before the inward gaze of total concentration dissolved the subject before his eyes", a "freeze-frame baroque" style of writing and cogitation. "His major essays seem to end just in time, before they self-destruct". The occasional difficulties of Benjamin's style are essential to his philosophical project. Fascinated by notions of reference and constellation, his goal in later works was to use intertexts to reveal aspects of the past that cannot, and should not, be understood within greater, monolithic constructs of historical understanding.

Benjamin's writings identify him as a modernist for whom the philosophic merges with the literary: logical philosophic reasoning cannot account for all experience, especially not for self-representation via art. He presented his stylistic concerns in "The Task of the Translator", wherein he posits that a literary translation, by definition, produces deformations and misunderstandings of the original text. Moreover, in the deformed text, otherwise hidden aspects of the original, source-language text are elucidated, while previously obvious aspects become unreadable. Such translational modification of the source text is productive; when placed in a specific constellation of works and ideas, newly revealed affinities, between historical objects, appear and are productive of philosophical truth.

His work "The Task of the Translator" was the subject of a commentary by the French translation scholar Antoine Berman (L'âge de la traduction).

== Legacy and reception ==
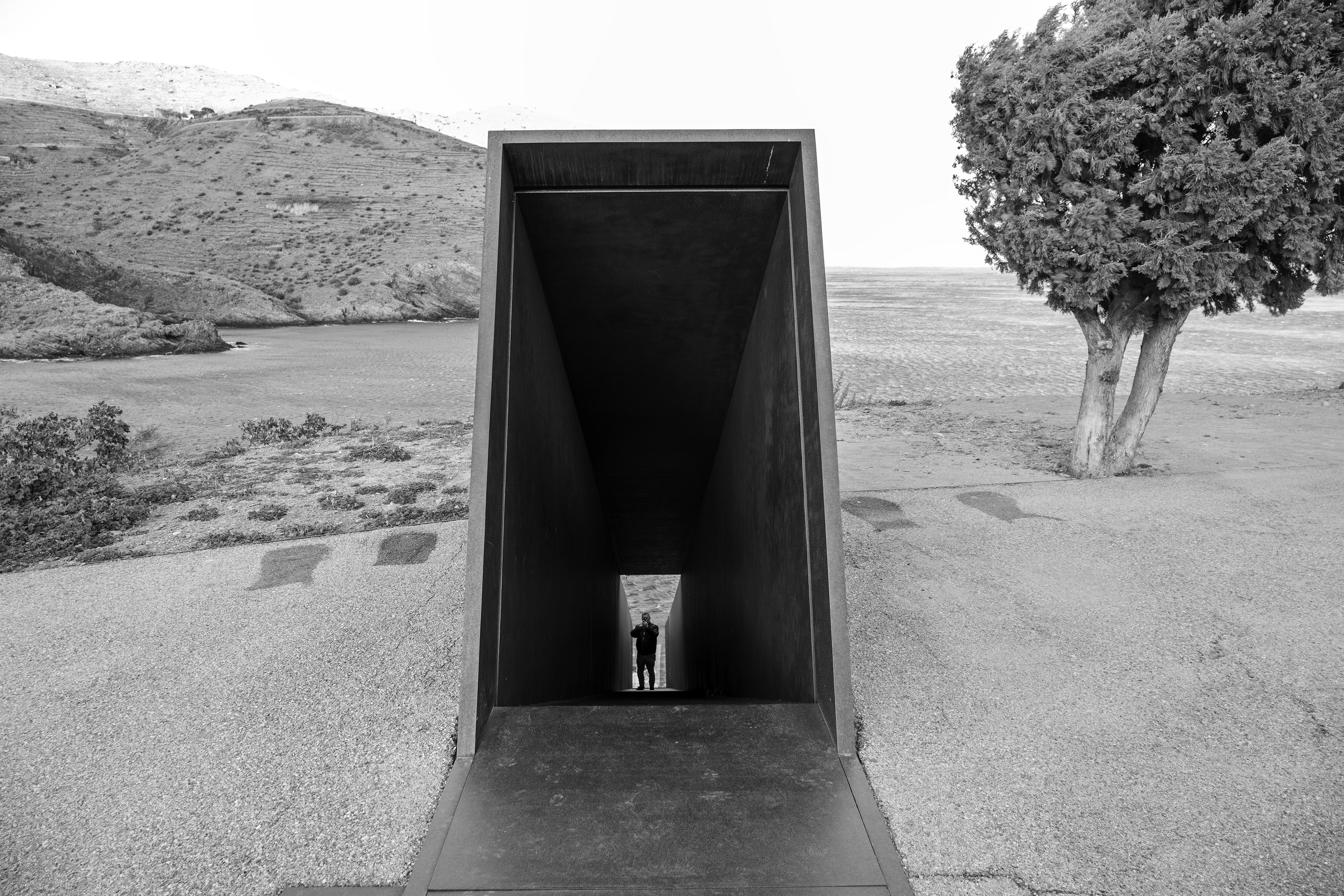
Memorial in Portbou

Since the publication of Schriften (Writings, 1955), 15 years after his death, Benjamin's work—especially the essay "The Work of Art in the Age of Mechanical Reproduction" (French edition, 1936)—has become of seminal importance to academics in the humanities disciplines. In 1968, the first Internationale Walter Benjamin Gesellschaft was established by the German thinker, poet and artist Natias Neutert, as a free association of philosophers, writers, artists, media theoreticians and editors. They did not take Benjamin's body of thought as a scholastic "closed architecture [...], but as one in which all doors, windows and roof hatches are widely open", as the founder Neutert put it—more poetically than politically—in his manifesto. The members felt liberated to take Benjamin's ideas as a welcome touchstone for social change.

Like the first Internationale Walter Benjamin Gesellschaft, a new one, established in 2000, researches and discusses the imperative that Benjamin formulated in his "Theses on the Philosophy of History": "In every era the attempt must be made anew to wrest the tradition away from a conformism that is about to overpower it." The successor society was registered in Karlsruhe (Germany); Chairman of the Board of Directors was Bernd Witte, an internationally recognized Benjamin scholar and Professor of Modern German Literature in Düsseldorf (Germany). Its members come from 19 countries, both within and beyond Europe and it provides an international forum for discourse. The Society supported research endeavors devoted to the creative and visionary potential of Benjamin's works and their view of 20th century modernism. Special emphasis had been placed upon strengthening academic ties to Latin America and Eastern and Central Europe. The society conducts conferences and exhibitions, as well as interdisciplinary and intermedial events, at regular intervals and different European venues:

- Barcelona Conference – September 2000
- Walter-Benjamin-Evening at Berlin – November 2001
- Walter-Benjamin-Evening at Karlsruhe – January 2003
- Rome Conference – November 2003
- Zurich Conference – October 2004
- Paris Conference – June 2005
- Düsseldorf Conference – June 2005
- Düsseldorf Conference – November 2005
- Antwerpen Conference – May 2006
- Vienna Conference – March 2007

In 2017 Walter Benjamin's Arcades Project was reinterpreted in an exhibition curated by Jens Hoffman, held at the Jewish Museum in New York City. The exhibition, entitled "The Arcades: Contemporary Art and Walter Benjamin", featured 36 contemporary artworks representing the 36 convolutes of Benjamin's Project.

In 2022, Igor Chubarov, a modern Russian philosopher, specialist in media studies and translator of Benjamin's works into Russian, created the Russian-language Telegram channel "Radio Benjamin".

Benjamin is portrayed by Moritz Bleibtreu in the 2023 Netflix series Transatlantic.

== Commemoration ==
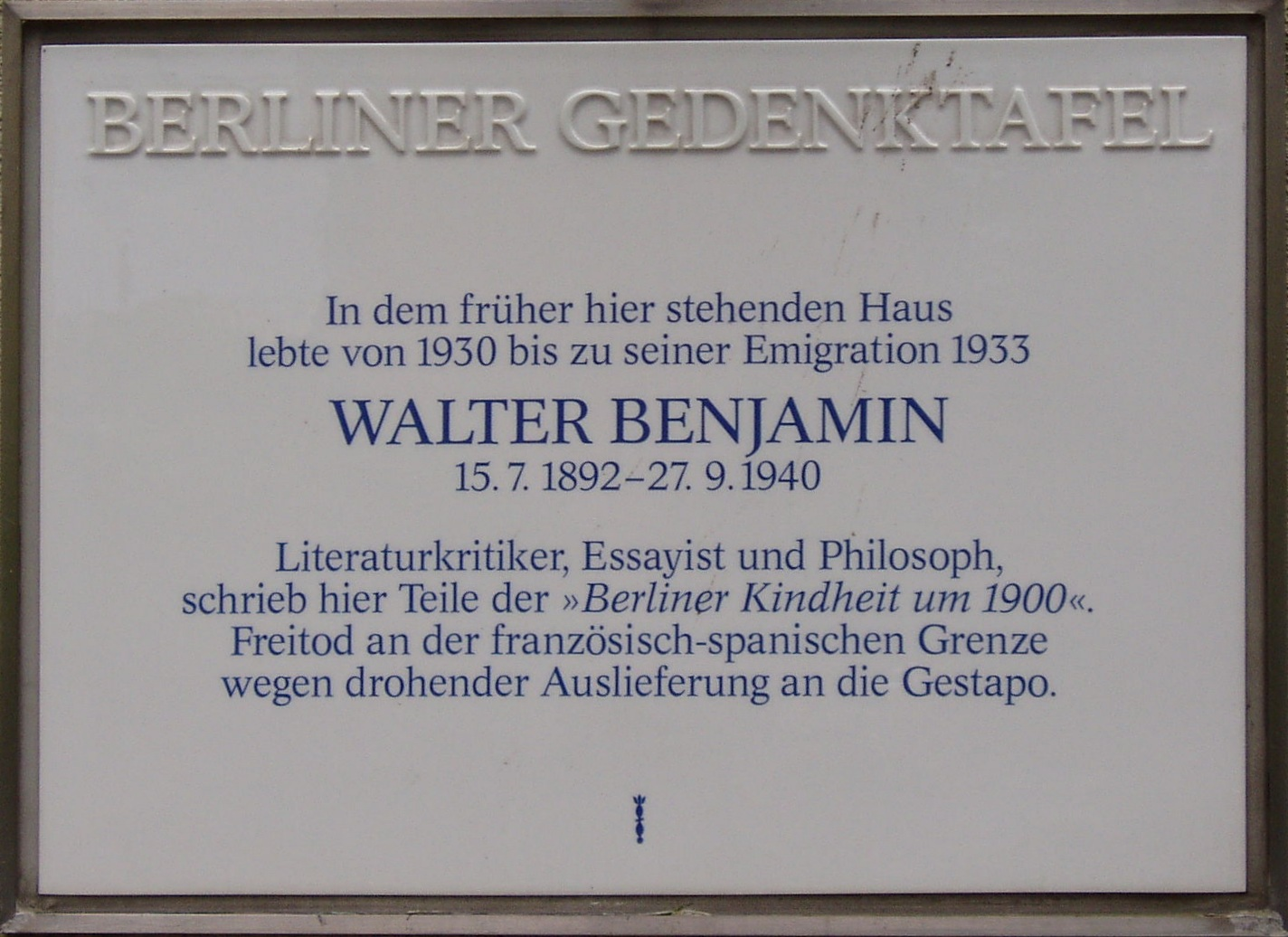
Commemorative plaque for Walter Benjamin, Berlin-Wilmersdorf

A commemorative plaque is located by the residence where Benjamin lived in Berlin during the years 1930–1933: (Prinzregentenstraße 66, Berlin-Wilmersdorf). A commemorative plaque is located in Paris (10 rue Dombasle, 15th) where Benjamin lived in 1938–1940.

Close by Kurfürstendamm, in the district of Charlottenburg-Wilmersdorf, a town square created by Hans Kollhoff in 2001 was named "Walter-Benjamin-Platz". There is a memorial sculpture by the artist Dani Karavan at Portbou, where Walter Benjamin ended his life. It was commissioned to mark 50 years since his death.

== Works (selection) ==
Among Walter Benjamin's works are:

- "Über Sprache überhaupt und über die Sprache des Menschen" ("On Language as Such and on the Language of Man", 1916)
- "Die Aufgabe des Übersetzers" ("The Task of the Translator", 1921) – English translations by Harry Zohn, 1968 and by Stephen Rendell, 1997
- "Zur Kritik der Gewalt" ("Critique of Violence", 1921)
- "Theologisch-politisches Fragment" ("Theologico-Political Fragment," 1921)
- “Kapitalismus als Religion”(“Capitalism as Religion”,1921)
- “Welt und Zeit” (“World and Time”, c. 1921-1922)
- "Goethes Wahlverwandtschaften" ("Goethe's Elective Affinities", 1922)
- Moskau Tageblatt (Moscow Diaries, 1926-1927)
- Ursprung des deutschen Trauerspiels (The Origin of German Tragic Drama, 1928)
- Einbahnstraße (One Way Street, 1928)
- "Theorien des deutschen Faschismus.” (“Theories of German Fascism,” 1930) First published as "Theorien des deutschen Faschismus. Zu der Sammelschrift 'Krieg und Krieger' herausgegeben von Ernst Jünger," Die Gesellschaft 7 vol. 2, (1930), 32-41.
- "Karl Kraus" (1931, in the Frankfurter Zeitung)
- Ich packe meine Bibliothek aus ("Unpacking my library", 1931)
- Berliner Chronik (Berlin Chronicle, 1932) (first edition of Berlin Childhood around 1900
- Berlin Childhood around 1900, 1932–1938)
- "Lehre vom Ähnlichen" ("Doctrine of the Similar", 1933)
- "Über das mimetische Vermögen" ("On the Mimetic Faculty", 1933)
- "Kafka" (The Kafka writings are composed most famously of "Franz Kafka: On the Tenth Anniversary of His Death", 1934, and "Some Remarks on Kafka", excerpted from a 1938 letter to Gershom Scholem. Both of these are collected in the anthology Illuminations. Benjamin also wrote, "Franz Kafka: Building the Great Wall of China" in 1931, a commentary on Max Brod's biography of Kafka in 1937, and carried on a correspondence about Kafka with Scholem and Adorno.)
- “Der Autor als Produzent". “The Author as Producer”, ‘presented as an address to the Institute for the Study of Fascism, 27 April 1934.’
- "Das Kunstwerk im Zeitalter seiner technischen Reproduzierbarkeit" ("The Work of Art in the Age of Mechanical Reproduction", 1935)
- "Paris, Hauptstadt des 19. Jahrhunderts" ("Paris, Capital of the 19th Century," 1935. This essay has been presented as a diptych with "Paris of the Second Empire in Baudelaire", as both are fragments from the preparatory writings for the unfinished Arcades Project.)
- "Der Erzähler" ("The Storyteller", 1936 was first published in Orient und Okzident)
- Deutschen Menschen (German People, 1936 is an epistolary anthology of letters reflecting the spirit of humanism in German history with Benjamin's commentary that he was able to publish under the radar of the Nazi censors inside the Third Reich by using the pseudonym 'Detlef Holtz')
- "Eduard Fuchs, der Sammler und der Historiker" ("Eduard Fuchs, Collector and Historian," 1937. Benjamin mentions embarking on the essay in letters from 1935 and was published the Zeitschrift für Sozialforschung two years later. Not much attended to compared to Benjamin's other major works, it contains the skeleton and many of the crucial phrases later made famous in his "Theses...").
- Berliner Kindheit um neunzehnhundert (Berlin Childhood around 1900, 1938)
- "Das Paris des Second Empire bei Baudelaire" ("The Paris of the Second Empire in Baudelaire", 1938)
- "Über den Begriff der Geschichte" ("Theses on the Philosophy of History", 1940)

== See also ==
- Gershom Scholem
- Kabbalah
- Hannah Arendt
- Theodor Adorno
- Bertolt Brecht
- Leo Strauss
- Martin Buber
- Georges Bataille
- Frankfurt School
- Rohwohlt Verlag
- Carl Schmitt
- Martin Heidegger
- Heinrich Rickert
- Giorgio Agamben
- Gertrud Kolmar
- Michael Heller
- List of people from Berlin
