= Why Bother? (essay) =

1996 essay by Jonathan Franzen

"Why Bother?", originally published as "Perchance to Dream: In the Age of Images, a Reason to Write Novels", is a literary essay by American novelist Jonathan Franzen. It is often referred to as "The Harper's Essay". First published in the April 1996 issue of Harper's magazine, the essay concerns the persistence of reading within the context of technological growth and distraction. Franzen recounts his meditations on the state and possibility of the novel form, often against the backdrop of his personal experience, eventually concluding that the novel still has potential cultural agency in the United States, and often gains it by paradoxical drives of both culture and author.

== Background ==
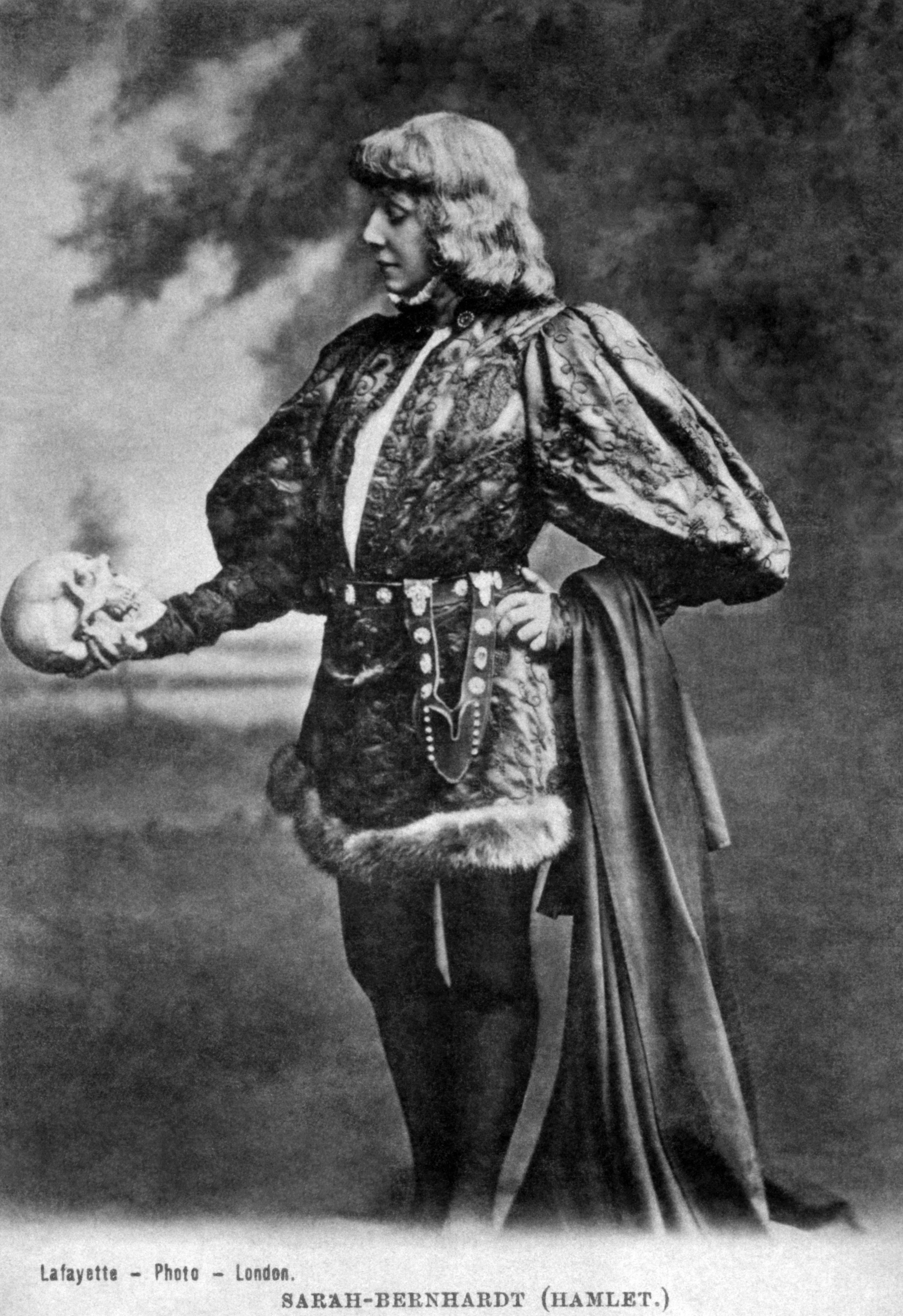
The article was originally titled in reference to Hamlet, but Franzen humorously notes that most interviewers entirely missed the reference.

The essay was initially published in the April 1996 issue of Harper's between the publication of Franzen's novels Strong Motion (1992) and The Corrections (2001). Franzen expanded and revised the essay, re-titling it "Why Bother?", and published it in his 2002 essay collection How to Be Alone. In the introduction to the collection, Franzen explained his changing the title as a response to the many interviewers asking about the essay but failing to understand its intention, believing the essay to be an explicit promise on Franzen's part of a third "Big Social Novel" featuring a good deal of local detail and observation. Franzen, instead, thought of the essay as a defense of reading and writing literature for its own sake in a modern world, expanding the essay later in response. Franzen noted that the original title was chosen by a Harper's editor hoping for easy recognition with Hamlet's soliloquy, but that interviewers frequently referred to the work as "The Harper's Essay". The essay makes frequent reference to the Paula Fox novel Desperate Characters, the work of linguistic anthropologist Shirley Brice Heath, Joseph Heller's novel Catch-22, and previous literary manifestos of Philip Roth, Flannery O'Connor and Tom Wolfe.

== Content ==
Franzen recounts his "despair about the American novel" beginning in 1991 during what he viewed as the media assent to the jingoism surrounding the Gulf War and the presidency of George H. W. Bush. During this time, Franzen finds parallels to his own life's ambiguities surrounding a war to those of the Brooklyn protagonist in the novel Desperate Characters dealing with the despair surrounding the Vietnam War. Franzen also notes the novel's possible interpretation that in such times literary representation may fail to rise to desperate settings, surmising that the novel may precede Phillip Roth's declaiming of the realistic novel in the 1980s. During those years, however, Franzen believed the aesthetic solution was a push towards illogical and surreal representations of contemporary culture, using as an example Joseph Heller, particularly the novel Catch-22. Franzen completed his first novel The Twenty-Seventh City in this style with the hopes that it would spark social change, but despite its being published to warm reviews, the work garnered little attention from the culture at large. Franzen found himself attributing this to the gap presented by magazines and newspapers no longer committing to book reviews in significant numbers due to the market having little use for the individual "final" product of writers, as opposed to more temporary and dispensable forms of entertainment. Franzen suspected up to the time of the late-Victorians, novels still had the cultural role and expectations of instructing and possibly constructively affronting social sensibilities; electronic media from journalism to music having taken both these roles, with the rise of visual media and its quick delivery forcing all recognition to a very literal level.

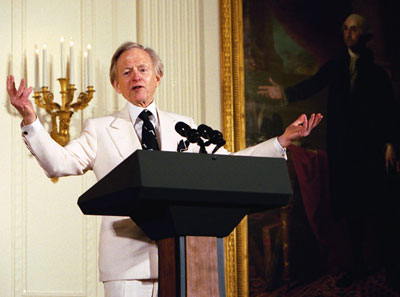
Franzen rejects the thesis presented by Tom Wolfe in "Stalking the Billion-Footed Beast" on grounds that fiction based on journalism seldom is given lasting media interest in the culture at large

Franzen finds these developments sharply in contrast to the circumstances and rewards of lasting attention promised in Tom Wolfe's literary manifesto, "Stalking the Billion-Footed Beast". In contrast, Franzen posits that in the current cultural, media, and technological circumstances, major cultural problems are themselves cognitively reduced to surface issues for which immediate cures must be found. Franzen's recognition of these trends, along with the quick rise and cultural saturation of electronic media temporarily left him in despair as to the possibility of universal cultural engagement.

During this period of personal disillusionment, Franzen came to be acquainted with Shirley Brice Heath, a linguistic anthropologist from Stanford. Franzen mentions first his astonishment at Heath's research methods, doing interviews in public places including public transit systems, airport waiting areas and resorts seeking what Heath defines as "enforced transition zones". Heath's interviews generally consist of discovering from individuals reading "substantive works of fiction" why they are reading, rather than using electronic media to stave off boredom. Heath's research found that those who continue reading this type of fiction frequently modeled on the individual enjoying reading first at a young age. Additionally, Heath found that the reading of substantive fiction is done by those of all educational backgrounds and economic positions. Heath's research divided those who developed the habit of substantively reading between those who modeled the reading of their parents, and those who found themselves social isolates as children from an early age. Those who began reading as social isolates are usually classed as more likely to become professional writers when they mature. Franzen notes that modern literature has frequently featured both writers and protagonists as social isolates, from the exiled characters of James Joyce to the self-isolates of J. D. Salinger. Extending this, he finds that many contemporary American authors have been notorious for their publicly recalcitrant nature, giving the examples of Philip Roth, Cormac McCarthy, Don DeLillo, William Gaddis, Thomas Pynchon, and Denis Johnson.

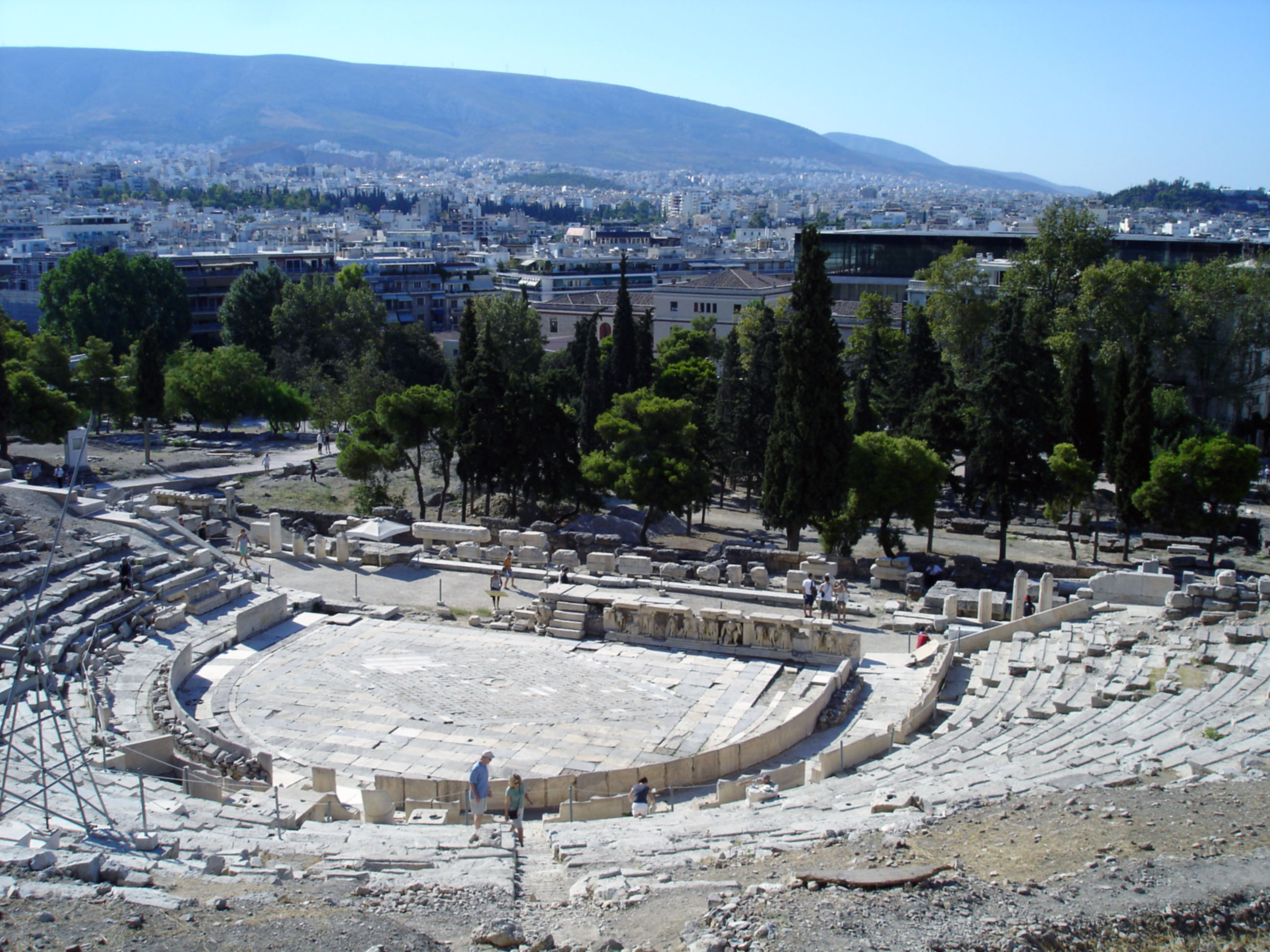
Franzen makes frequent mention to Ancient Greek Theatre as embodying values of art still present in modern literature

In the spring of 1994, while teaching at Swarthmore College, Franzen recalls his realization that the push towards balkanization of fiction—seeking to place Women's Fiction and Gay Literature at the forefront of the curriculum — is not necessarily decided with the best interests of the authors' representative groups in mind, but more often intended as therapeutic against modern malaise, blaming "canonical" work as "Symptoms of Disease". Franzen also expresses great worry that the spread of this process will make young writers expect only to write within the context of their particular "ethnic or gender identity", ironically losing diversity of literature by seeking diverse cultural groups' literature. Franzen also cites some promise in Heath's research, finding that those who frequently read substantive fiction are those who find themselves emancipated from their original cultural heritage, making their reading a source of personal and intellectual integrity. Franzen further cites the work of Anthony Lane suggesting that while the majority of best-selling novels are of low quality, the trend holds true for a good deal of the history of the reading public. However, he does note such exceptions as Norman Mailer's ability to balance publicity with solitary work. Franzen then formulates a long-term opposition to literary culture, beginning with Plato, and extending the trend through to the contemporary arguments that literature is "undemocratic" and not politically viable. He opposes this to the long history of American literary protagonists who, though solitary, have been celebrated as exemplars of American freedom including Huckleberry Finn, Hazel Motes, and Tyrone Slothrop. Franzen suggests that the writing that shares the most political agency and aesthetic dignity would embody the values of expressive language, and urging the reader to look beyond appearances. He believes both values to be features of modern literature as well as western classics such as Oedipus Rex, but finding modern literature most effective in its tragic opposition to modern optimism. Franzen further defends the notion of literature as "depressing" by Flannery O'Connor's formulation that frequent reach for the "other" by reading marks, in fact, the absence of clinical depression. Franzen also notes that while America has always been at least in part, controlled by oppressive commerce, it has also had its victim-conquerors such as Herman Melville, who worked in spite of mental illness to deliver democratic art. Franzen concludes recounting his epiphany at being again able to read and write with a new sense of social responsibility. He advocates the possibility of tragic realism as containing potential for social change. Around this time, he also receives personal correspondence from Don DeLillo encouraging him in the path of writing as both personal freedom, with the—albeit weak—potential of changing culture in solitude as a permanent gift to writers.

== Reception ==
In the introduction to the essay collection How to Be Alone, Franzen notes that he was frequently asked about the essay in interviews, and that may have aroused more interest than any of his fictional works.

In a review of How to Be Alone for The A.V. Club, Andy Battaglia called Franzen's conclusions "a lot more heartening than might be expected", and found that the collection of essays was made far more interesting by both Franzen's tone of anxiety, as well as the controversies surrounding The Corrections being selected for Oprah's Book Club.

Robert Rebein suggests that the original essay marks an intentional turning point in Franzen's style from early postmodern work to that of traditional realism. Rebein further notes that if Franzen's sales numbers are any indication, The Corrections certainly accomplished some degree of the cultural notoriety he desired.

Ruth Franklin, in a review of Freedom for The New Republic, found the essay to be unfocused and ultimately inconclusive as to what the goal of the Social Novel, or the novel in general should be. Her review found Franzen's novels as well as his essays to depict a great cultural urgency, but neither find ways of confronting it.

In a review of The Corrections for The eXile, John Dolan criticized the novel for not realizing Franzen's ambition as expressed in the essay. Dolan suggested that while Franzen believed himself to be writing in a style influenced by social realism, he was in fact relying on film and television clichés in the construction of his novels.

== See also ==
- Death of the novel
