= Dylan Baker =

American actor (born 1959)

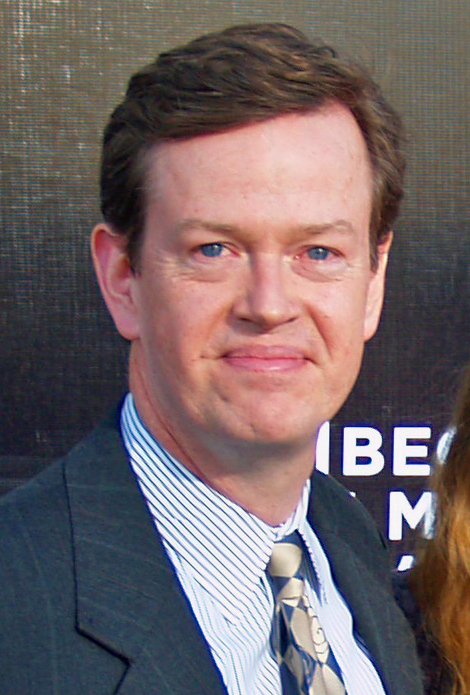
- Baker in 2007
- Born: October 7, 1959 (age 67); Syracuse, New York, U.S.
- Education: College of William and Mary (attended); Southern Methodist University (BFA); Yale University (MFA)
- Occupation: Actor
- Years active: 1986–present
- Political party: Democratic
- Spouse: Becky Ann Baker (m. 1990)
- Children: 1

Dylan Baker (born October 7, 1959) is an American actor. He gained recognition for his roles in films such as Planes, Trains and Automobiles (1987), Happiness (1998), Thirteen Days (2000), Road to Perdition (2002), Spider-Man 2 (2004), Spider-Man 3 (2007), Trick 'r Treat (2007), Revolutionary Road (2008), Anchorman 2: The Legend Continues (2013), and Selma (2014). On television he has had prominent roles in series such as Murder One (1995–1996), The Good Wife (2010–2015), Damages (2011), The Americans (2016), and Homeland (2018). For The Good Wife he earned three Primetime Emmy Award nominations.

Baker was nominated for a Tony Award and a Drama Desk Award for his performance in the original production of La Bête in 1991. He made his directorial debut with the film 23 Blast in 2013.

== Early life and education ==
Baker was born in Syracuse, New York and raised in Lynchburg, Virginia. He began his acting career as a teenager in regional theater productions. He attended Holy Cross Regional Catholic School, went on to attend Darlington School, and graduated from the Georgetown Preparatory School in 1976.

Baker attended the College of William and Mary in Virginia and later graduated from Southern Methodist University in 1980. He then received a Master's in Fine Arts from the Yale School of Drama, where he studied alongside Chris Noth and Patricia Clarkson.

== Career ==
Baker's Broadway theatre credits include Eastern Standard, La Bête (for which he received a Tony Award nomination), Mauritius, and God of Carnage. He won an Obie Award in 1986 for his performance in the off-Broadway play Not About Heroes. The next year, he made his motion picture debut in the feature film Planes, Trains and Automobiles (1987).

Baker's first recurring TV role was on Steven Bochco's highly acclaimed Murder One (1995). Since then, he has appeared in such TV series as Northern Exposure, Law & Order, Law & Order: Criminal Intent, Without a Trace, CSI: Crime Scene Investigation, The West Wing, and the short-lived sitcom The Pitts.

He garnered major critical attention with his performance as a tormented pedophile in Todd Solondz's Happiness (1998). In 2000, he portrayed Secretary of Defense Robert McNamara in Thirteen Days, a historical drama about the Cuban Missile Crisis. He also held a small role in Requiem for a Dream, where he played a doctor who sees Jared Leto's character with a severely infected, rotting arm. In 2002 he portrayed Alexander Rance, an accountant for the Chicago Outfit, in Road to Perdition. He played Dr. Curt Connors in Spider-Man 2 (2004) and Spider-Man 3 (2007).

During the short-lived 2007 series Drive, Baker played the role of John Trimble, a father with a terminal illness. In 2009, Baker played William Cross in NBC's Kings, in which his wife Becky Ann Baker played Jessie Shepherd, the mother of protagonist David Shepherd. Baker also guest starred in an episode of Monk, playing a theater critic in "Mr. Monk and the Critic". Baker guest starred in the November 2010 House episode "A Pox on Our House". Baker guest starred in the season four finale of Burn Notice as Raines, an old spy friend of Michael's. He reprised the role in the season five premiere, and also permitted his likeness to be used in the Burn Notice graphic novel "A New Day". In 2010, Baker played Hollis B. Chenery in Secretariat.

Baker played Pashto-speaking CIA agent Jerry Boorman in season 4 of the TV series Damages. He guest-starred in "Upper West Side Story" (2012), an episode of the TV series White Collar. He had a recurring role as the father of Katharine McPhee's character Karen Cartwright on the NBC TV series Smash. He appeared in the USA Network miniseries Political Animals (2012). For his performance as Colin Sweeney on The Good Wife, he was nominated for the Primetime Emmy Award for Outstanding Guest Actor in a Drama Series in 2010, 2012, and 2014.

Baker performed with Helen Mirren on Broadway in The Audience, a play that depicted meetings between Queen Elizabeth II and important historical figures. Baker played former Prime Minister John Major. The play opened on March 8, 2015.

Baker portrays corrupt DEA Agent Bill Peterson in the seventh season on The Mentalist.

In 2016, Baker had a memorable recurring role as deep-cover KGB agent William Crandall, a morally conflicted biological weapons expert, on Season 4 of FX series The Americans.

In September 2017, it was announced that Baker would be joining the cast of the Showtime drama Homeland for the show's 7th season, as Sen. Sam Paley, a 'maverick' who is leading an excessive investigation of the administration of new President Elizabeth Keane.

He starred in the 2020 series Hunters, in which his wife had a supporting role.

=== Audiobooks ===
Baker is a prolific narrator of audiobooks, from fiction (The Grapes of Wrath, The Corrections) to biographies (Steve Jobs) to Argo.

He received the 2002 Audie Award for Abridged Fiction for his reading of The Corrections by Jonathan Franzen. He has also recorded Franzen's 2015 novel Purity.

== Personal life ==
Baker married actress Becky Gelke, now known professionally as Becky Ann Baker, in 1990. They have a daughter and reside in New York City.

On September 1, 2015, Baker tried to save the life of his neighbor, Broadway and movie actress and dancer Vivien Eng, after her apartment caught fire in the New York City high-rise where they both lived at the time. He was driven back by smoke and flames. Firefighters eventually got the seriously injured woman out of the apartment and rushed her to the hospital, where she died two days later.

== Filmography ==
=== Film ===
Year	Title	Role	Notes
1987	Ishtar	Aghast Nightclub Patron	Uncredited
1987	Planes, Trains and Automobiles	Owen	
1988	The Wizard of Loneliness	Duffy Kahler	
1990	The Long Walk Home	Tunker Thompson	
1991	Delirious	Blake Hedison	
1992	Passed Away	Unsworth	
1992	Love Potion No. 9	Prince Geoffrey	
1993	Life with Mikey	Mr. Burns	
1994	Radioland Murders	Detective Jasper	
1994	Disclosure	Philip Blackburn	
1995	The Stars Fell on Henrietta	Alex Wilde	
1996	True Blue	Michael Suarez, S.J.	
1998	Happiness	Bill Maplewood	
1998	Celebrity	Priest At Catholic Retreat	
1999	Simply Irresistible	Jonathan Bendel	
1999	Random Hearts	Richard Judd	
1999	Oxygen	FBI Agent Jackson Lantham	
2000	Committed	Carl's Editor	
2000	Requiem for a Dream	Southern Doctor	
2000	The Cell	Henry West	
2000	Thirteen Days	Robert McNamara	
2001	The Tailor of Panama	General Dusenbaker	
2001	Along Came a Spider	FBI Special Agent-In-Charge Ollie McArthur	
2002	Road to Perdition	Alexander Rance	
2002	A Gentleman's Game	Mr. Price	
2002	Changing Lanes	Finch	
2003	Head of State	Martin Geller	
2003	How to Deal	Steve Beckwith	
2003	Rick	'Buck'	
2004	Spider-Man 2	Dr. Curt Connors	
2004	Kinsey	Alan Gregg	
2005	Hide and Seek	Sheriff Hafferty	
2006	The Matador	Mr. Lovell	
2006	Stealing Martin Lane	Parker Banks	
2006	Fido	Bill Robinson	
2006	Let's Go to Prison	Warden	
2007	When a Man Falls	Bill	
2007	Spider-Man 3	Dr. Curt Connors	
2007	The Hunting Party	CIA Operative	
2007	Across the Universe	Mr. Carrigan – Lucy's Father	
2007	The Stone Angel	Marvin Shipley	
2007	Trick 'r Treat	Principal Steven Wilkins	
2008	Diminished Capacity	'Mad Dog' McClure	
2008	Revolutionary Road	Jack Ordway	
2009	Under New Management	Legal Aid Lawyer	
2010	Secretariat	Hollis Chenery	
2011	About Sunny	Max	
2012	2 Days in New York	Ron	
2013	23 Blast	Larry Freeman	Director
2013	Anchorman 2: The Legend Continues	Freddy Shapp	
2014	The Humbling	Dr. Farr	
2014	Selma	J. Edgar Hoover	
2015	Actor Seeks Role	Dr. Freidman	Short film
2015	Applesauce	Stevie Bricks	
2015	Nightfire	Olivetti	Short film
2015	The Benefactor	Bobby	
2016	Catfight	Dr. Jones	
2016	Miss Sloane	Jon O'Neill	
2016	No Beast so fierce	Hank	
2017	The Misogynists	Cameron	
2018	Elizabeth Harvest	Logan	
2019	Extremely Wicked, Shockingly Evil and Vile	David Yocom	
2022	I'm Charlie Walker	Mr. Bennett	
2022	Outpost	Reggie	
2023	LaRoy, Texas	Harry	
2023	Dream Scenario	Richard	
2026	Teenage Sex and Death at Camp Miasma	Jeffrey	
2026	A Statement	George M. Woodwell	

=== Television ===
Year	Title	Role	Notes
1986	A Case of Deadly Force	Kevin O'Donnell	Television movie
1988	The Murder of Mary Phagan	The Governor's Assistant	2 episodes
1988	Miami Vice	Lt. Edward Jerell	Episode: "Honor Among Thieves?"
1988	Spenser: For Hire	Sam Reynolds	Episode: "Substantial Justice"
1988	American Playhouse	George 'Jig' Cook	Episode: "Journey Into Genius"
1990	Judgment	Father Delambre	Television movie
1991	Law & Order	Sean Hyland	Episode: "His Hour Upon the Stage"
1993	Return to Lonesome Dove	Nigel Winston, Cattleman's Alliance	3 episodes
1993	Northern Exposure	Jeffy O'Connell	Episode: "Grosse Pointe, 48230"
1993	Love, Honor & Obey: The Last Mafia Marriage	Curtis Pinger	Television movie
1995–96	Murder One	Det. Arthur Polson	18 episodes
1997	Feds	Jack Gaffney	Episode: "Smoking Gun"
1998	Law & Order	Aaron Downing	Episode: "Flight"
1998	Oz	Schillinger's Defense Attorney	Episode: "Great Men"
2000	Strangers with Candy	Minister Arsenew	Episode: "Is Freedom Free?"
2001	Big Apple	Inspector Bob Cooper	2 episodes
2001	The Practice	Sen. Keith Ellison	2 episodes
2001	CSI: Crime Scene Investigation	Father Powell	Episode: "Alter Boys"
2002	The Laramie Project	Rulon Stacey	Television movie
2002	Benjamin Franklin	Benjamin Franklin	3 episodes
2003	The Pitts	Bob Pitt	7 episodes
2003	The West Wing	Attorney General Alan Fisk	Episode: "Abu el Banat"
2003	The Elizabeth Smart Story	Ed Smart	Television movie
2004–06, 2022–23, 2025	Law & Order	Sanford Rems	6 episodes
2004	Third Watch	Councilman Daniels	Episode: "Broken"
2004	Life as We Know It	Roland Conner	2 episodes
2005	Without a Trace	Brian Stone	Episode: "Manhunt"
2006	The Book of Daniel	Roger Paxton	6 episodes
2007	Drive	John Trimble	6 episodes
2009	Kings	William Cross	12 episodes
2009	Law & Order: Criminal Intent	Henry Muller	Episode: "Major Case"
2009	Monk	John Hannigan	Episode: "Mr. Monk and the Critic"
2009	Ugly Betty	Bennett Wallis	3 episodes
2010–15	The Good Wife	Colin Sweeney	8 episodes
2010	House	Dr. Dave Broda	Episode: "A Pox on Our House"
2010–11	Burn Notice	Raines	2 episodes
2011	Damages	Jerry Boorman	10 episodes
2012	White Collar	Andy Woods	Episode: "Upper West Side Story"
2012	Political Animals	Fred Collier	5 episodes
2012–13	Smash	Roger Cartwright	3 episodes
2013	Zero Hour	FBI Chief Terrence Fisk	3 episodes
2013–14	Chicago Fire	Dr. David Arata	2 episodes
2014	Turks & Caicos	Gary Bethwaite	Television movie
2014	Chicago P.D.	Dr. David Arata	Episode: "8:30 PM"
2015	The Mentalist	Bill Peterson	2 episodes
2016	The Americans	William Crandall	8 episodes
2016	Confirmation	Orrin Hatch	Television movie
2016–20	Blindspot	FBI Director Pellington	6 episodes
2017	Difficult People	Tourist	Episode: "Criminal Minds"
2017	Little Women	Robert March	3 episodes
2017–18	The Good Fight	Colin Sweeney	2 episodes
2017–18	I'm Dying Up Here	Johnny Carson	5 episodes
2018	Elementary	Armand Venetto	Episode: "The Adventure of the Ersatz Sobekneferu"
2018	Homeland	Senator Sam Paley	8 episodes
2020–23	Hunters	Biff Simpson	11 episodes
2020	Social Distance	Neil Currier	Episode: "Humane Animal Trap"
2021	Evil	Father Kay	2 episodes
2021	The Hot Zone: Anthrax	Ed Copak	6 episodes
2022	The Resort	Carl	4 episodes
2022	Inside Man	Casey	4 episodes
2022	Would I Lie to You? (US)	Himself	Episode: "Singing Waitress"
2025	The Gilded Age	Dr. Logan	Episode: "My Mind Is Made Up"
2025	Only Murders in the Building	Ron	Episode: "Silver Alert"

=== Theatre ===
Year	Title	Role	Venue	Ref.
1989	Eastern Standard	Stephen Wheeler	John Golden Theatre, Broadway	
1991	La Bête	Prince Conty	Eugene O'Neill Theatre, Broadway	
2007	Mauritius	Phillip	Biltmore Theatre, Broadway	
2008	November	Archer Brown	Ethel Barrymore Theatre, Broadway	
2009	God of Carnage	Alan (replacement)	Bernard B. Jacobs Theatre, Broadway	
2015	The Audience	John Major	Gerald Schoenfeld Theatre, Broadway	
2016	The Front Page	McCue	Broadhurst Theatre, Broadway	
2018	Bernhardt/Hamlet	Constant Coquelin	American Airlines Theatre, Broadway	
2024	Corruption	Tom Crone / Glenn Mulcaire	Mitzi E. Newhouse Theatre, Lincoln Center	

== Awards and nominations ==
Year	Association	Category	Project	Result	Ref.
1991	Tony Award	Best Featured Actor in a Play	La Bête	Nominated	
1998	Gotham Awards	Breakthrough Actor	Happiness	Won	
1998	Independent Spirit Award	Best Male Lead	Happiness	Nominated	
1998	National Board of Review	Best Cast	Happiness	Won	
1998	New York Film Critics Circle Award	Best Supporting Actor	Happiness	Nominated	
2008	Palm Springs International Film Festival	Best Cast	Revolutionary Road	Won	
2010	Primetime Emmy Award	Outstanding Guest Actor in a Drama Series	The Good Wife	Nominated	
2012	Primetime Emmy Award	Outstanding Guest Actor in a Drama Series	The Good Wife	Nominated	
2014	Primetime Emmy Award	Outstanding Guest Actor in a Drama Series	The Good Wife	Nominated	
2012	Critics' Choice Television Award	Best Guest Performer in a Drama Series	Damages	Nominated	
2013	San Diego Film Critics Society	Best Cast	Selma	Nominated	
2013	Washington D.C. Area Film Critics Association	Best Ensemble	Selma	Nominated	
2014	Critics' Choice Movie Award	Best Acting Ensemble	Selma	Nominated	
