= Freedom (Franzen novel) =

2010 novel by Jonathan Franzen

- First edition cover
- Author: Jonathan Franzen
- Language: English
- Publisher: Farrar, Straus and Giroux
- Publication date: August 31, 2010
- Publication place: United States
- Media type: Print (hardback)
- Pages: 576
- ISBN: 0-374-15846-0
- Dewey Decimal: 813.54
- LC Class: PS3556.R352
- Preceded by: The Corrections
- Followed by: Purity

Freedom is a 2010 novel by American author Jonathan Franzen. It was published by Farrar, Straus and Giroux. Freedom received general acclaim from book critics, was ranked one of the best books of 2010 by several publications, and called by some critics the "Great American Novel". In 2022, it was announced that Freedom would be adapted for television.

The novel follows the lives of the Berglund family, particularly the parents Patty and Walter, as their lives develop and their happiness eventually falls apart. Important to their story is a college friend of Walter's and successful rock musician, Richard Katz, who has an affair with Patty. Walter and Patty's son, Joey, also goes through his own coming-of-age challenges.

Franzen began working on the novel in 2001, following his successful novel The Corrections. The title of the novel was an artifact of his book proposal, where he wanted to write a novel that freed him from the constraints of his previous work. The cover of many editions of the novel includes a cerulean warbler, a songbird, for which Walter works to create an environmental preserve.

== Plot ==
=== Good Neighbors ===
The novel opens with the Berglund family during their time living in St. Paul, Minnesota, from the perspective of their nosy neighbors. One of the first families to move back into urban St. Paul after years of white flight, the Berglunds are portrayed as an ideal liberal middle-class family. Walter Berglund is a mild-mannered environmentalist lawyer, and his wife Patty is a charming and youthful homemaker who cares for their two children, Jessica and Joey. The precocious Joey’s move to his girlfriend’s Republican family next door increasingly destabilizes Patty and Walter’s marriage. Years later, while the children are at college, the unhappy couple relocates to Washington, D.C.

=== Mistakes Were Made ===
The second section of the novel is a story-within-a-story, presented as an autobiography written by Patty at her therapist's suggestion. She recalls her youth as a star basketball player, her alienation from her busy parents and artistic siblings, and being raped at a party. After receiving a varsity scholarship to the University of Minnesota, her disturbed friend, Eliza, draws her into contact with the attractive Macalester rocker Richard Katz and his kind-hearted, nerdy roommate, Walter Berglund.

After detaching herself from Eliza and suffering a career-ending injury, Patty unsuccessfully attempts to woo Richard. When he rejects her advances, she settles down instead with Walter, who has been patiently courting her for a year. They marry and raise their family for many happy years, but begin to suffer marital problems as Joey and Jessica become adolescents. Joey moves out of the house and in with his childhood girlfriend Connie next door, worsening Patty’s spiral into alcoholism and depression. Meanwhile, Richard struggles with fluctuating artistic success and abandons his music career. Twenty years after leaving college, Patty and Richard have a brief affair at the Berglunds' vacation house at an unnamed lake in Minnesota.

=== 2004 ===
The third section of the novel jumps to the early 2000s, and alternates in viewpoint among Richard, Joey, and Walter.

By 2004, a middle-aged Richard has found success as a minor indie rock star with breakthrough album Nameless Lake, secretly inspired by his affair. Walter starts working for an environmental organization in Washington D.C., the Cerulean Mountain Trust, which is supported by the coal industry and aims to strip mine parts of West Virginia, eventually turning the denuded land into a cerulean warbler preserve. Walter attempts to enlist Richard in his anti-human overpopulation pet project, which he is funding with Cerulean Trust money.

Navigating many difficulties in establishing the warbler preserve, at the cost of his anti-Iraq War principles, Walter confesses his growing love for his younger female assistant, Lalitha, but is unable to act on it. Devoting himself to his anti-overpopulation campaign, Free Space, Walter invites Richard to visit. Richard notices that Walter and Lalitha have fallen in love and advises Patty to leave him so they can be happy, but she refuses, showing him the autobiography she wrote as therapy. Richard leaves the manuscript on Walter’s desk, where he reads it and discovers the infidelity. Enraged, he throws Patty out despite her pleas that she still loves him. She moves in with Richard in Jersey City.

Meanwhile, the Berglunds’ estranged son, Joey, attends the University of Virginia. He blames his dissatisfaction there on the recent September 11 attacks and attempts to break away from Connie. At Thanksgiving with his wealthy roommate Jonathan’s family in Northern Virginia, he is dazzled by Jonathan’s beautiful sister, Jenna, and connects with Jonathan’s Zionist, neoconservative father. He secures a well-paid job with Kenny Bartles, an Iraq War-profiteering entrepreneur, and signs a subcontract to procure truck parts for Bartles’s DOD truck contract.

Connie struggles with depression in Joey’s absence, and when reunited they impulsively elope after she gives him her savings to invest in the subcontract. However, he continues to pursue Jenna, and goes on a trip with her, only to unexpectedly suffer impotence. Bartles pressures Joey to ship defective truck parts to the Army to fulfill the contract. Feeling guilty, Joey reconnects with his father and confesses wanting to blow the whistle on the truck contract, but ultimately decides against it, instead donating the profits.

With Patty gone, Walter and Lalitha become lovers. However, still reeling from the separation, Walter loses his temper and rants against capitalism and overpopulation on live TV, making him an icon of radical youth. Fired from the Trust, Walter and Lalitha continue to organize Free Space, but it devolves into a destructive radical echo-chamber. Lalitha goes to West Virginia alone to manage an upcoming Free Space concert, leaving a depressed Walter in Minnesota. On the way, she is killed in a car crash.

=== Mistakes Were Made (Conclusion) ===
The penultimate section of the novel is a follow-up chapter to Patty's autobiography, written specifically for Walter. Patty reveals that she has not talked to Walter for six years. She lasted only several months living with Richard, and stays with college friends until her father is diagnosed with cancer. She travels home to Westchester and settles fights about her father’s inheritance. She settles down in Brooklyn, living alone and working as a teacher’s aide and coach. One day, she runs into Richard, who encourages her to get in touch with Walter.

=== Canterbridge Estates Lake ===
After Lalitha’s death, the severely depressed Walter retreats to his family’s vacation home on the lake, where he turns into a misanthropic recluse, directing his anger at the inhabitants and domestic cats of Canterbridge Estates, a new housing development on the other side of the lake. One day, Walter, who refused to read the manuscript Patty sent him, finds her on the steps of his house. Despite his rage and confusion, he takes her back, and they slowly rekindle their relationship. Patty wins the admiration of the residents of Canterbridge Estates despite Walter’s longstanding animosity, but after one year of living together at the lake house, they decide to move to New York to be near family and Richard. According to Walter's wishes, the lake house is turned into a cat-proof bird sanctuary, named in memory of Lalitha.

== Development ==
After the critical acclaim and popular success of his third novel The Corrections in 2001, Franzen began work on his fourth full-length novel. When asked during an October 30, 2002, interview on Charlie Rose how far he was into writing the new novel, Franzen replied:

I'm about a year of frustration and confusion into it ... Y'know, I'm kind of down at the bottom of the submerged iceberg peering up for the surface of the water ... I don't have doubt about my ability to write a good book, but I have lots of doubt about what it's going to look like.

Franzen went on to suggest that a basic story outline was in place, and that his writing of the new novel was like a "guerrilla war" approaching different aspects of the novel (alluding to characters, dialogue, plot development, etc.). Franzen also agreed that he would avoid public appearances, saying that "getting some work done is the vacation" from the promotional work surrounding The Corrections and How To Be Alone.

An excerpt entitled "Good Neighbors" appeared in the June 8 and 15, 2009, issues of The New Yorker. The magazine published a second extract entitled "Agreeable" in the May 31, 2010, edition.

On October 16, 2009, Franzen made an appearance alongside David Bezmozgis at the New Yorker Festival held in the Cedar Lake Theatre to read a portion of his forthcoming novel. Sam Allard, writing for North By Northwestern website covering the event, said that the "material from his new (reportedly massive) novel "was as buoyant and compelling as ever" and "marked by his familiar undercurrent of tragedy". Franzen read "an extended clip from the second chapter".

On March 12, 2010, details about the plot and content of Freedom were published in the Macmillan fall catalogue for 2010.

In an interview with Dave Haslam on October 3, 2010, Franzen discussed why he had called the book Freedom:

The reason I slapped the word on the book proposal I sold three years ago without any clear idea of what kind of book it was going to be is that I wanted to write a book that would free me in some way. And I will say this about the abstract concept of 'freedom'; it's possible you are freer if you accept what you are and just get on with being the person you are, than if you maintain this kind of uncommitted I'm free-to-be-this, free-to-be-that, faux freedom.

Franzen has stated the writing of Freedom was deeply impacted by the death of his close friend and fellow novelist David Foster Wallace.

== Reception ==
Shortly before the book's release, Time magazine featured Franzen on its cover, describing him as a "Great American Novelist", making him the first author to appear on its cover in a decade.

Sam Tanenhaus of The New York Times and Benjamin Alsup of Esquire believed it measured up to Franzen's previous novel, The Corrections. Tanenhaus called it a "masterpiece of American fiction", writing that it "[told] an engrossing story" and "[illuminated], through the steady radiance of its author's profound moral intelligence, the world we thought we knew." Alsup called it a great American novel. In The Millions, Garth Risk Hallberg argued that readers who enjoyed The Corrections would enjoy Freedom, writing that readers are "likely to come away from this novel moved in harder-to-fathom ways—and grateful for it." An editor for Publishers Weekly wrote that it stood apart from most modern fiction because "Franzen tries to account for his often stridently unlikable characters and find where they (and we) went wrong, arriving at—incredibly—genuine hope."

Benjamin Secher of The Telegraph called Franzen one of America's best living novelists, and Freedom the first great American novel of the "post-Obama era". In The Guardian, Jonathan Jones called him "a literary genius" and wrote that Freedom stood on "a different plane from other contemporary fiction".

Michiko Kakutani called the book "galvanic" and wrote that it showcased Franzen's talent as a storyteller and "his ability to throw open a big, Updikean picture window on American middle-class life." Kakutani also praised the novel's characterization, going on to call it a "compelling biography of a dysfunctional family and an indelible portrait of our times." The Economist stated that the novel contained "fully imagined characters in a powerful narrative" and had "all its predecessor's power and none of its faults."

Not all reviews were raving. Most lukewarm reviews praised the novel's prose, but believed the author's left-wing political stance was too obvious. Sam Anderson, in a review for New York magazine, thought the characterization was strong, but perceived the politics as sometimes too heavy-handed: "Franzen the crank—mighty detester of Twitter, ATVs, and housing developments" occasionally "overpower[s] Franzen the artist ... but if crankiness is the motor that powers Franzen's art, I'm perfectly willing to sit through some speeches." Ron Charles of The Washington Post remarked that it lacked the wit and "[freshness]" of The Corrections. Charles praised Franzen's prose and called him "an extraordinary stylist", but questioned how many readers would settle for good writing as "sufficient compensation for what is sometimes a misanthropic slog." Ruth Franklin of The New Republic believed the novel resembled a "soap opera" more than it did an epic, and that Franzen had forgotten "the greatest novels must ... offer ... profundity and pleasure."

Alexander Nazaryan criticized its familiarity in the New York Daily News remarking that the author "can write about a gentrifying family in St. Paul. Or maybe in St. Louis. But that's about it." Nazaryan also didn't believe Franzen was joking when he suggested "being doomed as a novelist never to do anything but stories of Midwestern families." Alan Cheuse of National Public Radio found the novel "[brilliant]" but not enjoyable, suggesting that "every line, every insight, seems covered with a light film of disdain. Franzen seems never to have met a normal, decent, struggling human being whom he didn't want to make us feel ever so slightly superior to. His book just has too much brightness and not enough color." In a scathing review for The Atlantic, Brian Reynolds Myers called the book "juvenile" and "directionless", and filled with "mediocrities".

Ross Douthat of First Things praised the "stretches of Freedom that read like a master class in how to write sympathetically about the kind of characters" with an abundance of freedom. Yet, Douthat concluded the novel was overlong, feeling the "impression that Franzen's talents are being wasted on his characters."

== Awards and endorsements ==
Freedom won the John Gardner Fiction Award. Additionally, it was a finalist for the Los Angeles Times Book Prize and the National Book Critics Circle Award for Fiction. The American Library Association also named it a notable fiction of the 2010 publishing year.

Oprah Winfrey made Freedom her first book club selection of 2010, saying, "this book is a masterpiece." US President Barack Obama called it "terrific" after reading it over the summer.

== Adaptation ==
In July 2022, it was announced that Tomorrow Studios and Scott Free Productions would adapt Freedom as a television series. The script will be written by Melanie Marnich, which Franzen said was a "perfect choice." Franzen, Marnich, and Ridley Scott will serve as executive producers for the series.
