= Purity (novel) =

English-language novel by Franzen, published in 2015

- First edition cover
- Author: Jonathan Franzen
- Audio read by: Dylan Baker; Jenna Lamia; Robert Petkoff
- Cover artist: Rodrigo Corral (design); Bon Duke (photograph)
- Language: English
- Publisher: Farrar, Straus and Giroux
- Publication date: September 1, 2015
- Publication place: United States
- Media type: Print (hardback)
- Pages: 563
- ISBN: 978-0-374-23921-3
- Preceded by: Freedom

Purity is a novel by American author Jonathan Franzen, his fifth. it was published on September 1, 2015 by Farrar, Straus and Giroux.

The novel has six sections that focus on several characters and tell the tale of Purity "Pip" Tyler and her quest to discover her biological father, leading her to Andreas Wolf, a German-born hacker based in Bolivia, and Tom Aberant, an editor and journalist based in Denver.

== Purity in Oakland ==
Twenty-three year old Purity Tyler, who goes by the name "Pip," has crushing student-loan debt and works as a telemarketer for a company selling dubious green-energy schemes to meet her minimum payments. She lives in a communal rent-free squat, and harbors a secret love for a married man named Stephen. Raised by her reclusive mother Penelope in Felton, California, Pip has a unique and co-dependent relationship with her, though she refuses to tell Pip anything about her father or life prior to Pip's birth, including Penelope's real name and age. After impressing one of the visitors to the squat, a beautiful German anti-nuclear activist named Annagret, Pip is recruited for The Sunshine Project, a fictional competitor to WikiLeaks run by a man named Andreas Wolf. Pip is uninterested in joining the project, but changes her mind after Stephen rejects her and calls her a daughter figure, deciding to move to Bolivia for the Sunshine Project on the belief that Andreas Wolf is capable of tracking down her father.

== The Republic of Bad Taste ==
In 1987, Andreas Wolf lives in East Germany, where he acts as a youth counselor for a church, routinely having sex with the teenaged girls he counsels. There, he meets a troubled 15-year-old Annagret, whose stepfather Horst has begun sexually abusing her, and has a protected status as a low-level Stasi informant. Andreas becomes obsessed with Annagret and offers to kill Horst, instructing her to lure Horst to Andreas's parents' remote dacha. They kill him and bury his body, but Annagret regrets the murder and distances herself from Andreas, who reflects on his own upbringing.

Born to an English literature professor and a high-level official in the East German government, Andreas is indulged by all as a child. However, as he grows older, he begins to realize that his family life is a facade, with his mother suffering bouts of deep depression and having multiple affairs. Andreas is sent to a psychiatrist as a teenager, ostensibly due to his excessive masturbation, when in reality he is suffering from depression after a "ghost" approached him and told him that he was Andreas' actual father, a former graduate student of his mother's with whom she had an affair. Becoming increasingly disillusioned, Andreas publishes a poem containing an obscene and treasonous acrostic. His parents protect him from imprisonment, but when given the choice between completing the army service he has been avoiding, or total estrangement from his family, Andreas chooses estrangement.

To Andreas's surprise, Horst's disappearance appears to go unsolved. Two years later, as the Berlin Wall is about to come down, he grows paranoid that his crime will be exposed when the Stasi files are unsealed. He approaches his long-estranged father and arranges for one last favor from the party, gaining access to both his own and Horst's Stasi records. While trying to escape with the records, he runs into television cameras and uses the opportunity to denounce the government, quickly becoming a celebrity dissident for shining "sunlight" on the state's secrets. While celebrating his own success, he meets an American journalist, Tom Aberant.

== Too Much Information ==
Leila Helou is a 52-year-old investigative journalist for the Denver Independent, an online newspaper. Chasing down a story in Texas, she finds herself missing Pip Tyler, who is now working as an intern at the newspaper and gave Leila the lead for the story. Leila is still married to her now-paraplegic husband, but maintains a long-term relationship with the Independent's founder and editor, Tom Aberant. Thinking of Pip as the daughter she never had, Leila presses Tom into expanding her role and salary. However, as Tom becomes enthralled with Pip himself and offers to let her live with him and Leila, Leila becomes jealous of Pip and begins to think that she and her husband are lovers. After returning from a work trip, Leila accuses Tom of wanting to leave her for Pip, and is shocked when he reveals that he has discovered that Pip's mother is his ex-wife Anabel, and that he believes that he is Pip's father.

== Moonglow Dairy ==
Pip goes to work in Bolivia, and is dismayed by the bizarre hierarchy at The Sunshine Project where status is determined by proximity to Andreas Wolf. Andreas pursues Pip sexually, claiming to be falling in love with her, and confessing about the murder of Horst. Although they have sexual encounters, Pip refuses to have intercourse with him. At the end of six months, Andreas tells Pip that it is impossible to track down her father, and suggests that her skills lie in investigative journalism. He sends her to Denver and has her install spyware in Tom's home, as Tom is the only other person who knows about Horst's murder. Pip comes to genuinely enjoy working for Tom and Leila and realizes they have no agenda regarding Andreas, regretting installing the spyware. She threatens Andreas to help her uninstall it, but Tom discovers the spyware and fires her, realizing that she is an agent sent by Andreas, but also that she does not know who he is.

In the '90s, Tom Aberant finds himself engaging in sex with his estranged ex-wife Anabel repeatedly. He recalls their courtship, when he was a college student at the University of Pennsylvania and editor-in-chief of The Daily Pennsylvanian. He falls in love with Anabel Laird, an unpopular artist and activist at the Tyler School of Art with a massive family fortune that she claims to hate. The two develop an intense codependency and sexual relationship, which only grows more abusive in marriage, as Anabel's artistic career fails and she descends into anorexia. When Tom's mother Clelia reveals that she is dying, Tom travels with her to East Germany to reunite with the family she abandoned. After Andreas's television appearance, Tom meets him and they bond quickly, with Tom revealing that he wants to divorce Anabel, and Andreas confessing to Horst's murder. He persuades Tom to help him rebury Horst's body in a different location, and masturbates on the grave, leaving Tom unsettled. He then leaves East Germany without meeting Andreas again, causing Andreas to become paranoid.

Tom returns to America and divorces Anabel, though they continue sleeping together. Finally, to end their relationship, he tells her that he is going to accept a huge check from her father. Anabel is furious and disappears without a trace. When her father dies in 2003, Tom accepts $20,000,000 to fund his own publication, the "Denver Independent".

== The Killer ==
After Tom helps Andreas rebury the body, Andreas gets back together with Annagret, but becomes angry when she befriends his mother, calling his rage "the killer". They eventually separate, and Andreas becomes an internet celebrity and a wanted man in many countries for his leaks. In his growing paranoia, he endlessly searches for information about himself, and when a journalist, Leila Helou, castigates him for "dirty secrets," he connects her with Tom Aberant, who he is convinced has betrayed him. Seeking revenge, he discovers that Tom's wife vanished long ago, and uses face-recognition software to locate Anabel living in Felton under the name Penelope. Believing Tom to likely be Pip's father, Andreas asks Annagret to recruit Pip.

When Tom finally learns that he has been spied on, he travels to Bolivia to see Wolf, who is surprised to learn that Tom has kept his secret. Wolf leads Tom to a high, isolated cliff and taunts Tom with his knowledge about Pip and having read Tom's secret memoir about his relationship with Anabel. Failing to goad Tom into killing him, even by telling him that he has mailed the secret memoir to Pip, Wolf leaps off the cliff.

== The Rain Comes ==
Now knowing that Tom is her father and that Anabel is a wealthy heiress, Pip struggles with her identity and finds her mother's trust-fund manager, convincing her to sign a release so that they can access her funds. Pip arranges for Tom to see Anabel again after 25 years, hoping that they might find peace, but is alarmed to see that they are still full of fury about their relationship. Waiting outside with her boyfriend Jason as her parents fight, Pip reflects on her life and her parents', and hopes to do better than they did.

== Characters ==
- Purity "Pip" Tyler, a young woman from California who has been raised to be co-dependent with her mother and struggles to escape from her emotionally. Pip sees herself as average in every way, but finds herself constantly drawing the attention of other, more powerful people.
- Andreas Wolf, a German who was raised by his mother as a golden child who could do no wrong and who is selfish, magnetic, and perhaps psychopathic.
- Leila Helou, a Texas-born journalist of Lebanese descent who has spent much of her life with two men, neither of whom has been willing to have a child with her: the selfish Charles Blenheim, a literary has-been, and Tom Aberant, an American journalist and editor.
- Tom Aberant, the American born son of a German mother who is a journalist and the editor of the Denver Independent and who is Leila's lover.
- Penelope Tyler, Pip's deceitful mother who lives as a recluse in a mountain hut and who refuses to tell Pip her real name or the name of Pip's father.
- Annagret, a German anti-nuclear activist and former lover of Andreas Wolf.

== Development ==
The novel had been in development since before December 18, 2012, when Franzen revealed that he had "a four-page, single-spaced proposal" for a fifth novel. A longer excerpt of the novel was published in The New Yorker in June 2015.

On November 17, 2014, The New York Times Artsbeat Blog reported that the novel, titled Purity, would be released in September. Jonathan Galassi, president and publisher of Farrar, Straus and Giroux, described Purity as a multigenerational American epic that spans decades and continents.

== Reception ==
The novel garnered high praise from some and negative reviews from others, with Nick Patch stating that the debates centered on Franzen himself. The novelist told the Toronto Star, "So, people with a lot of time on their hands and no real interest in what is true think I’m a bad person — So what? It’s not going to end my career.” Michiko Kakutani's review in The New York Times was favorable, calling the book "dynamic" and dubbing it Franzen's "most intimate novel yet." Harper's described the novel's plot as a "beautiful arabesque," and suggests that Franzen seems to have responded to past accusations of anti-feminist chauvinism with blunt clichés.

Darlena Cunha said the novel "only serves to criticize young feminists who use the Internet and dare to stand up to convention. [...] In Purity, Franzen equates masculinity with power, money, logic, and cruel thinking. But when these traits lead his male protagonists down sordid paths, the blame falls on the women — the crazy mothers, the crazy wives, the vulnerable girls." A review of the book in The Economist magazine stated Purity did not compare favorably with his previous works. It stated that the book "feels like an imitation of Mr. Franzen's earlier novels, without the emotional resonance and subtlety."

In a June 2018 profile of Franzen in The New York Times Magazine, Purity was revealed to have been a relative commercial disappointment compared to Franzen's two previous novels. According to the article, Purity has only sold 255,476 copies to date since its release in 2015, compared to 1.15 million copies of Freedom sold since its publication in 2010, and 1.6 million copies of The Corrections sold since its publication in 2001.

== Scrapped television series ==
In 2016, Daily Variety reported that the novel was in the process of being adapted into a 20-hour limited series for Showtime by Todd Field who would share writing duties with Franzen and the playwright Sir David Hare. It would star Daniel Craig as Andreas Wolf and be executive produced by Field, Franzen, Craig, Hare and Scott Rudin.

However, in a February 2018 interview with The Times London, Hare said that, given the budget for Field's adaptation ($170 million), he doubted it would ever be made, but added "It was one of the richest and most interesting six weeks of my life, sitting in a room with Todd Field, Jonathan Franzen and Daniel Craig bashing out the story. They're extremely interesting people."

In June 2018, The New York Times Magazine published a profile of Franzen that reported him receiving a phone call from series writer/director Todd Field to give the news that pre-production on the series had been halted. Star Daniel Craig also called to explain that he had "been summoned" to star in another James Bond movie. In 2017, The Hollywood Reporter quoted Showtime CEO David Nevins as saying that after Craig's commitment to the 25th James Bond movie, the Purity adaptation was still on track. "He's doing Bond first and I can't say anything about what I know or don't know about Bond, [but] It's possible it may not shoot until 2019." Field, however, would later debunk these rumors; "I think there was a polite— words that were said, 'Oh you know, it was a Bond thing that came up,' but that wasn't true," he said in 2023. "It was just that the network just didn't want to spend what the three of us thought needed to be spent to make the thing that we spent a year of our lives on." While regretting that he couldn't successfully get the project off the ground, Field said he would not return to it: "We could never go back to it now because it would feel cheap as if we were being opportunistic instead of being prophetic."
