= Mr. Difficult =

Essay on reading difficult books

"Mr. Difficult", subtitled "William Gaddis and the problem of hard-to-read books", is a 2002 essay by Jonathan Franzen that appeared in the 9/30/2002 issue of The New Yorker. It was reprinted in the paperback edition of How to Be Alone without the subtitle.

The essay describes the experience of being thought of as difficult by his readers and his own experience at reading difficult books. Franzen then provides an extended commentary on most of Gaddis's novels.

The essay has attracted strong reactions. Novelist Ben Marcus had a negative opinion. Novelist Cynthia Ozick mentioned the Franzen/Marcus disagreement as part of a larger picture on the nature of reviewing. Author and publisher Phil Jourdan also had a negative opinion. A 2013 review of Gaddis's letters described the literary significance of Gaddis by summarizing Franzen's essay.

== Mrs. M—'s complaint ==
The essay begins by describing some of the negative reactions his third novel, The Corrections, received. One letter writer, identified as "Mrs. M— from Maryland", had a list of 30 vocabulary words (like "diurnality" and "antipodes") and some flowery phrases (like "electro-pointillist Santa Claus faces") from the novel that she did not approve of. She asked who Franzen was writing for, since it was certainly not the "average person who just enjoys a good read." She answered her question with what Franzen calls a caricature of him and his presumed readership.

Franzen finds himself ambivalent about his reaction to Mrs. M—. He credits this ambivalence to his parents. His father was an admirer of scholars, while his mother was anti-élitist.

== The Status and Contract models ==
Franzen proceeds to summarize his ambivalence in terms of two models.

=== The Status model ===
The "Status" model is presented as championed by Flaubert. It views writing to be an act of high art, best done by geniuses and whose worth has nothing to do with the opinion of the masses, who are doubtless philistines anyway.

=== The Contract model ===
The "Contract" model presumes there is a specific audience of readers that the novel is meant for. This can be narrow, like followers of Finnegans Wake, or wide, like the readers of Barbara Cartland. But the author has implicitly "contracted" to appeal to this circle of readers, and is to be judged on those grounds.

Franzen allows that it is quite possible for a novel to fulfill both models. He mentions Pride and Prejudice and The House of Mirth. But he says that the models diverge when the novel is difficult.

In short, difficulty is a sign of success under the Status model, and a sign of failure under the Contract model.

Franzen then proceeds to list nine books that he has never been able to complete, including Moby-Dick, Don Quixote, and Mason & Dixon. (He will add to this list of unfinished books later in the essay.) He then mentions the most difficult book that he has completed is The Recognitions.

== Reading The Recognitions ==
Franzen then tells the story of how he came to read The Recognitions in the early 1990s (about the time he published his second novel). His previous year had been miserable from a writing point of view, with a failed screenplay. Borrowing money, he left Philadelphia and moved into a Tribeca loft. At some point, looking for distractions, Franzen purchased a copy of the Gaddis novel, and then made it his daily job, reading it six to eight hours a day for a week and a half. He comments that the first two hundred pages were read partly out of professional curiosity, but that the rest were read out of love for the story, and that finishing the novel qualified as an act of virtue.

Franzen includes some commentary on the novel. He also mentions that he failed to notice at the time the many parallels between the novel's main character and his own life and art.

== List of difficult authors ==
Franzen returns to how in college he was trained to read and admire complicated texts, finding fault with modern systems, and his ambition became that of creating literary art:

I took for granted that the greatest novels were tricky in their methods, resisted casual reading, and merited sustained study.

Franzen then identifies 13 authors that he determined in his early post-college days as "a canon of intellectually, socially edgy, white-male American fiction writers" who "shared the postmodern suspicion of realism". They are, listed in the order Franzen gave:

- Thomas Pynchon
- Joseph Heller
- Don DeLillo
- Robert Coover
- William Gaddis
- William Gass
- William Burroughs
- John Barth
- Donald Barthelme
- Barry Hannah
- John Hawkes
- Joseph McElroy
- Stanley Elkin

These are authors that, at the time, Franzen thought he wanted to write like. He made a serious attempt to read these authors, but he never got more than a few pages into them (including The Recognitions). But he realized that the writers he liked to read were not the difficult ones with "academic and hipster respect." Meanwhile, he continued writing his own version of difficult, System novels.

== Franzen and J R ==
Franzen jumps ahead to his later, successful reading of The Recognitions. He acknowledges it influenced him strongly, including his naming one of his novels The Corrections.

Franzen tells how a few years later he then attempted to read J R. He had less free time, only putting in one or two hours a night. Somewhere past the halfway point, he put the book down for too long a stretch, and then found it impossible to return to the novel. He identifies his last connection to the novel: his bookmark is still on page 469.

Franzen isn't sure whom to "blame" here. He claims he thought of himself as the ideal Systems/Status reader, and for him to give up was like quitting a cult, as opposed to quitting a mainstream church, where people come and go all the time:

Nothing in my Congregational experience had prepared me for the fanatical fervor, the guilt-provoking authority, of Mr. Difficult.

== In high-brow culture ==
A book review of a new book by Joseph McElroy, one of the "hard-to-read 13" mentioned by Franzen, began by citing "Mr. Difficult" as if it were an essential credential. The review lavishly praises McElroy for maintaining his difficulty without a hint of compromise.

Online critics were particularly vocal following the essay's publication. One suggested that Jonathan Franzen was alone in disliking being challenged by books, and that most readers enjoy trying difficult books, for they are able to mentally enrich the reader.

The theme of Gaddis-versus-Franzen is part of the James Reiss poem "The Novel". The poem says that after Gaddis, the novel "didn't look back", but "... tramped past a bust of Jonathan Franzen."

A podcast about Franzen's novels debuted in 2021. The podcast is entitled Mr. Difficult: a podcast about Jonathan Franzen. It is hosted by author Erin Somers and the founding editors of Full Stop Magazine.

== See also ==
- Metamodernism
- Post-postmodernism
