= Farther Away =

Farther Away may refer to:

- Farther Away (book), a 2012 essay collection by Jonathan Franzen
- "Farther Away" (song), a song by Evanescence from Anywhere but Home

== See also ==
- Alejandro Selkirk Island, previously known as Más Afuera (Farther Away), a Chilean island
