= Ron Charles (critic) =

American literary critic (born 1962)

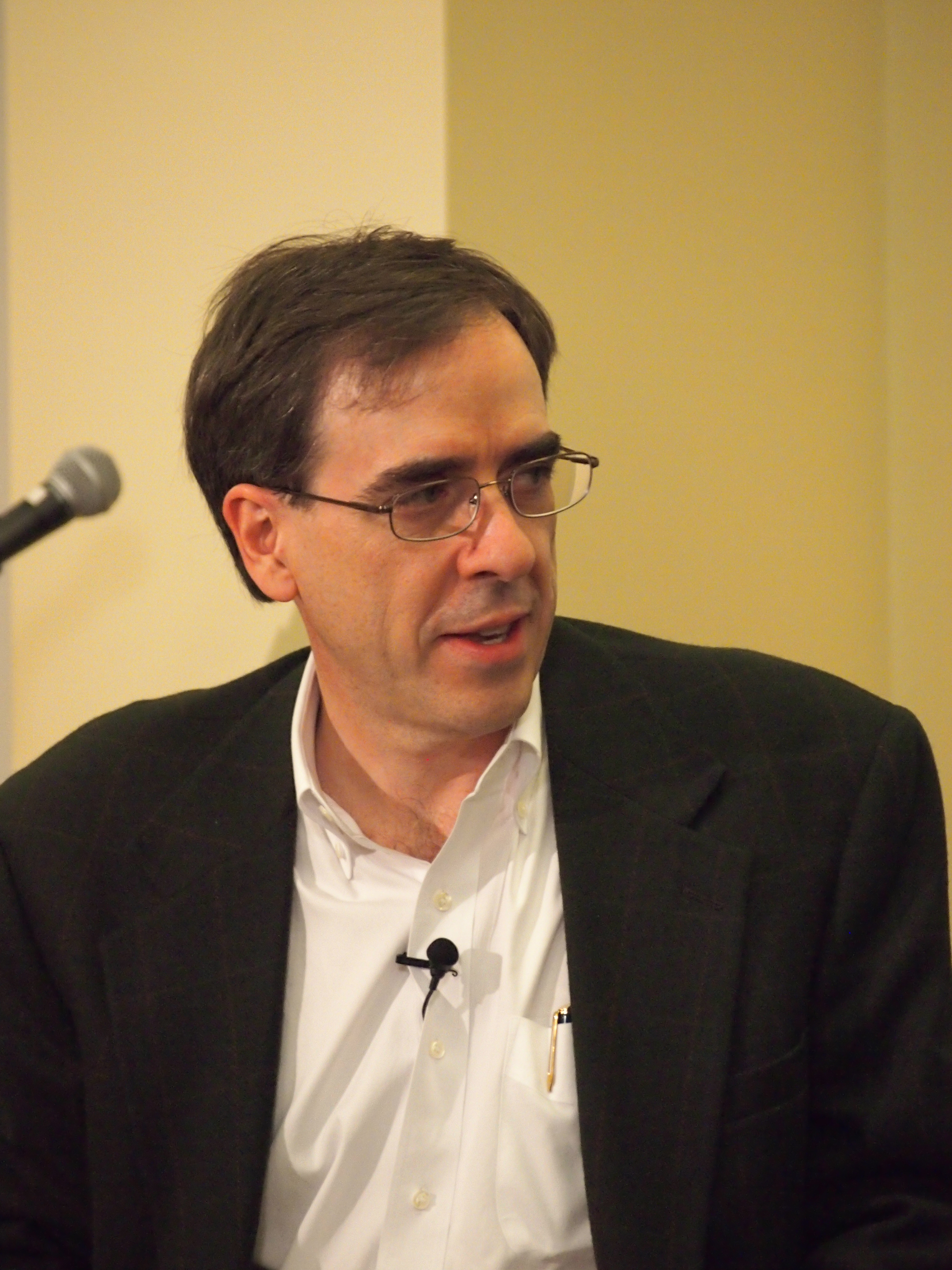
Ron Charles

Ron Charles (born 1962 in St. Louis, Missouri) is an American book critic, formerly of The Washington Post. His awards include the 2008 National Book Critics Circle Award Nona Balakian Citation for book reviews, and 1st Place for A&E Coverage from the Society for Features Journalism in 2011. He was one of three jurors for the 2014 Pulitzer Prize in Fiction.

Charles grew up in Town and Country, Missouri, and graduated from Principia College and Washington University in St. Louis before getting a job as a teacher at John Burroughs School. After a student's parent offhandedly suggested he try making a living as a book reviewer, Charles sent his first book review to The Christian Science Monitor, which eventually hired him. He spent seven years as the Monitor's book review editor and staff critic.

In 2005, he was hired by The Washington Post. Sometime after August 2010, with his review of Jonathan Franzen's Freedom, Charles began a series of video book reviews for Post called "The Totally Hip Video Book Review", a satirical look at books in the news and the art of book reviewing. In the series, Charles hams it up with sight gags and intentionally bad jokes; he is sometimes joined by his wife, high school English teacher Dawn Charles.

In 2026, Charles was laid off by The Washington Post when it reduced its staff by one-third and eliminated the newspaper's books and sports sections.

== See also ==
- Michael Dirda
- Jonathan Yardley
