= Crossroads (novel) =

2021 novel by Jonathan Franzen

- First edition cover
- Author: Jonathan Franzen
- Audio read by: David Pittu
- Cover artist: Rodrigo Corral
- Language: English
- Series: A Key to All Mythologies
- Release number: 1
- Genre: Family saga
- Set in: New Prospect, Illinois, 1971–1974
- Publisher: Farrar, Straus and Giroux
- Publication date: October 5, 2021
- Publication place: United States
- Media type: Print (hardcover), e-book, audio
- Pages: 592
- ISBN: 978-0-374-18117-8 (First edition hardcover)
- Dewey Decimal: 813/.54
- LC Class: PS3556.R352 C76 2021

Crossroads: A Novel is the sixth novel by American author Jonathan Franzen, published on October 5, 2021. It is a family saga set during the 1970s and centers on the Hildebrandt family in the fictional small town of New Prospect, Illinois. It was first announced on November 13, 2020, by Franzen's publisher Farrar, Straus and Giroux.

The novel is the first volume in a projected trilogy titled A Key to All Mythologies. Franzen intends the trilogy to "span three generations and trace the inner life of our culture through the present day."

== Plot ==
Crossroads follows Russ and Marion Hildebrandt, whose marriage is close to collapse, and their four children, Clem, Becky, Perry, and Judson. Each chapter is told from the perspective of one of the Hildebrandts, and most are set in the fictional New Prospect Township of suburban Chicago.

=== Advent ===
The first section, "Advent," takes place in the winter of 1971. Russ, an associate minister at First Reformed Church, flirts with a young widow, Frances Cottrell, and stews over his rivalry with the charismatic Rick Ambrose. Russ has been forced out of Crossroads, the popular youth group he founded at the Church, in favor of Rick's more popular – and less liturgical – style of leadership.

Both Perry and Becky have recently joined Crossroads. Precocious Perry has resolved to stop dealing pot and become a better person. Becky, a popular cheerleader, mistrusts Perry and thinks of him as a cynical schemer, though she is close with her elder brother, Clem. She has also clashed with her parents over a $13,000 inheritance she received from Marion's late sister, Broadway actress Aunt Shirley. Initially she attends Crossroads at the urging of Tanner Evans – "a bell-bottomed dreamboat" and aspiring musician on whom she has a crush – but eventually has a religious awakening of her own.

Clem, on the other hand, has had a sexual awakening with his college girlfriend Sharon, but he decides to end the relationship, drop out of school, and forfeit his draft deferral in order to fight in the Vietnam War out of a sense of moral obligation. Meanwhile, Marion is surreptitiously attending therapy sessions, at which she recounts traumatic episodes from her past, including an affair with a married man named Bradley Grant and a subsequent psychiatric breakdown. These episodes took place in Los Angeles shortly before she met Russ, and Marion has hidden them from her family, despite her increasing concern for Perry's mental stability. At Frances' urging, Russ tenuously reconciles with Rick.

=== Easter ===
The second section, "Easter," begins in the spring of 1972. Crossroads takes its annual service trip to Arizona, where Russ has connections with the Navajo community dating back to his alternative service in Arizona as a conscientious objector during World War II. Russ attends the trip as a chaperone, as does Frances, with whom he has recently smoked pot for the first time. Following a confrontation with a group of young Navajo men, who object to the all-white Church group's presence on the territory, Russ and Frances have sex. Marion is on vacation in California, ostensibly taking Judson to Disneyland and visiting an uncle, but in fact attempting to rekindle her relationship with Bradley. However, she makes peace with her own marriage when she realizes that Bradley has become unattractive in her absence. Perry has developed a cocaine addiction and, also with Crossroads in Arizona but neglected by Russ, he ends up in hospital after overdosing, being robbed, and committing arson.

That summer, Becky and Tanner take a trip around Europe, and Becky becomes pregnant, ending her aspirations to attend college. Back in New Prospect, living with Tanner and their daughter, Gracie, Becky becomes estranged from her parents. Russ and Marion have grown closer, but are thoroughly absorbed in caring for Perry, who has undergone several expensive rehab visits since his overdose in Arizona. Strapped for cash and partially alienated from New Prospect's community, they plan a move to a new pastoral posting in rural Indiana.

Becky has also fallen out with Clem, who – sent away by the draft board – embarked on a lengthy journey through Central and South America, becoming a jaded day laborer. The book ends in the spring of 1974, when Clem returns to New Prospect to reunite with Becky, and, possibly, his parents.

== Background ==
Franzen began writing Crossroads in early 2018, and completed it during the first four months of the COVID-19 pandemic in 2020.

Franzen has said that it was during the writing of Crossroads that he first fully embraced his place as "a novelist of character and psychology," as opposed to a novelist of form or social commentary. He attempted to restrict himself to "a strict realist narrative," and in this regard the project differed from his earlier novels.

Franzen also sees Crossroads as his first attempt to write "a family novel," where, in his view, a true family novel should span multiple generations and thus show "how patterns replicate themselves."

=== Religious themes ===
The project first arose from Franzen's conception of a single character, inspired by a new acquaintance who – like Russ in Crossroads – had a Mennonite background. As a teenager, Franzen belonged to a church youth group called Fellowship, which is the subject of his essay "The Joy Breaks Through" in The Discomfort Zone and which resembles Crossroads.

However, in Crossroads, Franzen approached religion as primarily "an emotional experience":

It wasn't my conscious intention, but I think I produced a book that has essentially no theology in it... I think the questions for me are, am I a good person? What can I do to be a better person? I don't think people are, by and large, saying, 'I want to be good according to some external standard.' I think they're wrestling with it in a more personal and specific way.

=== Historical setting ===
Asked why he chose to set Crossroads in the early 1970s, Franzen pointed to the close link between religion and progressive movements in the United States at that time – a time, that is, before Christianity was decisively associated with right-wing politics. He was also interested in the aftermath of the civil rights and anti-war movements and in the fact that "you started to see the first young people who were actually more conservative than their parents." Moreover, the 1970s had been the "most important decade of [his own] life."

Franzen has also said that he found it appealing to write about the past, rather than the present, during the years of the Trump administration, which he felt he "could not make sense of in real time."

=== A Key to All Mythologies ===
Franzen initially envisaged writing a single "super-novel" of three sections, with each section set 25 years apart. However, he decided to expand the project after beginning work on the first section, set in the 1970s. The first section, Crossroads, thus became the first in a projected trilogy.

The trilogy, A Key to All Mythologies, is named after Reverend Casaubon's unfinished manuscript in Middlemarch. Franzen has said that the "mythologies" which interest him are "irrational belief[s]" – "the fundamentally irrational basis for everything we think and do and espouse":

I have been thinking a lot about the inescapable nature of religion. Even if it is uncoupled from transcendent beliefs or metaphysical structures, everyone still organizes their life around something that can't be proved. I would say this goes particularly for the virulent atheists... [O]bviously, that phrase ['a key to all mythologies'] came to mind because if everyone has a mythology, it's only a matter of listing what they are, and suddenly you're thinking of a trilogy of novels. Of course, there is the fact that Casaubon dies in Middlemarch before he finishes his project. And undertaking writing three books in my 60s, I thought, 'Well, that's a funny little joke.'

The trilogy will eventually reach the 2020s and will center on the Hildebrandt family throughout, following their children and possibly some of their grandchildren. However, Franzen intends Crossroads and each of its two sequels to be "freestanding," and thus prefers to view the trilogy as "a trio of novels."

== Reception ==
Bookforum called it Franzen's "finest novel yet," his "greatest and most perfect novel," and Dwight Garner of The New York Times said it was "warmer than anything he's yet written, wider in its human sympathies, weightier of image and intellect." According to The Times Literary Supplement:

Crossroads is largely free from the vices to which Franzen's previous work has been addicted: the self-conscious topicality; the show-off sophistication; the formal heavy-handedness. It retains many of his familiar virtues: the robust characterization; the escalating comedy; the virtuosic command of narrative rhythm.

Critics especially praised the character of Marion, whom Garner called "one of the glorious characters in recent American fiction."

Not all reviews were unequivocally positive. A review in Vulture said that, in comparison to the better among Franzen's earlier novels, Crossroads seems "not only muddy and unstylish but determinedly and self-righteously so." Arguing that, other than Marion and Perry, the Hildebrandts are "boring" characters – and "boring in exactly the same way: stubborn, narrow, flummoxed, risk averse" – the review lamented the absence of the "weird words, arcane shit, and glorious tangents" which animate Franzen's earlier work. The Brooklyn Rail, arguing that Russ's story "read as if it's been told too often in American fiction," regretted that Franzen had not further developed the storylines involving the Navajo, a black inner-city church, and the female Hildebrandts, Marion and Becky.

It was selected for The Washington Post's "10 Best Books of 2021" list.

=== A "novel of ideas" ===
Reviewers noted that, in Crossroads, Franzen turns further away from his earlier aspirations towards writing "systems novels." The London Review of Books wrote, "Franzen certainly did what we wanted him to do: Crossroads is a family story that's interested in people, not systems." Yet several reviewers commented on the novel's overt concern with the notion of virtue and, in this respect, its thematic overlap with novels of the eighteenth and nineteenth centuries. According to the Chicago Review of Books:

Maybe the most attractive aspect of Crossroads is its depth of moral, capitalist, and religious contemplation—discursions that thankfully do not present via authorial (or authoritative) monologues... Franzen has reinvigorated the contemporary novel by offering a vision for how fiction can still serve as the preeminent vehicle for exploring humanity's most consequential ideas.

The New Republic said that the novel is "closer to a novel of ideas" than to a social realist novel:

...though it's not quite this either. Unlike a more typical novel of ideas... there are no lectures or staged debates. Characters are more than mouthpieces, although they and their discussions of being good are relatively flat. On some level, Franzen seems to know this, as the novel's plot ultimately undercuts its philosophizing. The irony of Crossroads is that it's a novel of ideas about the inadequacy of ideas...

Kathryn Schulz of The New Yorker agreed that Crossroads exhibits such a tendency towards philosophizing, and suggests that this is occasionally to the novel's detriment:

...[S]ome part of Franzen... is forever turning outward, toward the grand sweep of history and the prevailing customs and troubles of our era. Sometimes his attempts to square those two scales are successful... [But] he is at his finest when writing about the Midwest, the middle class, midlife crises, middlingness in general. The farther he ventures from all that, the shakier his plots become, the less organically they arise from his characters... In such moments, the characters seem subservient to a set of ideas...

=== Depiction of women and people of color ===
The New Republic said that the role of "materially starved-but-spiritually rich indigenous people" in the novel suggested that "[t]here is a critique to be made here about neocolonialism and the white man's fantasy of the exotic Other." In the Irish Independent, Naoise Dolan criticised the novel's portrayal of women and people of color, allowing that it accurately depicted "a particular consciousness" but questioning its literary value. Crossroads, she wrote, "treats anyone who's not white as one of its motifs, its character development moods."

However, others held that people of color are more convincingly rendered in Crossroads than in Franzen's earlier novels, argued that the depictions of the Navajo reflect more about Russ than about Franzen, or pointed to the irony present in those depictions.

=== Style ===
The most common complaint among critics was that the novel's prose style is mediocre. Rumaan Alam, writing for The Nation, noted a dearth of "lovely sentences" in Crossroads, but said that the middling prose style is compensated for by "the charms of plot and momentum, characters and conversation." Similarly, an otherwise positive review in The Times suggested that "the prose is bad" and described Franzen as "a major writer with a minor style," though he remains "highly readable." According to Vulture, the novel contained some "breathtaking" sentences but many more "inert" ones. The Times Literary Supplement said that its "frictionless style... sometimes feels a bit lacklustre." And Schulz said of Franzen:

...his prose has grown looser and laxer; never a showy author, he now sometimes scarcely seems like a good one. He has become so assertively styleless that he appears to have deemed linguistic pleasure not only inferior to but anathema to all other literary aims. Whole chapters—almost whole books—go by without a beautiful line or an arresting image... Franzen does not always seem to be doing the best he can.

Conversely, Wyatt Mason argued in The Wall Street Journal that Franzen's prose was excellent.

Several reviews commented on the awkwardness of the novel's sex scenes.
