= The Discomfort Zone =

Book by Jonathan Franzen

- First edition cover
- Author: Jonathan Franzen
- Cover artist: Jacket design by Lynn Buckley; Jacket art: "Map of a Man's Heart", from McCall's Magazine, January 1960, pp. 32-33. Adapted from nineteenth-century originals by Jo (Lowrey) Leeds and the editors of McCall's.
- Language: English
- Publisher: Farrar, Straus and Giroux
- Publication date: September 5, 2006
- Publication place: United States
- Media type: Print (Hardback & Paperback)
- Pages: 195 pp (first edition, hardback)
- ISBN: 0-374-29919-6 (first edition, hardback)
- OCLC: 63277685
- Dewey Decimal: 813/.54 B 22
- LC Class: PS3556.R352 Z46 2006

The Discomfort Zone: A Personal History is a 2006 memoir by Jonathan Franzen, who received the National Book Award for Fiction for his novel The Corrections in 2001.

== Themes ==
According to L'espresso, The Discomfort Zone reflects the values and contradictions of the American midwest in the 1960s. Franzen holds up Charlie Brown from the Peanuts cartoons as an exemplary representation of life of the American middle class in the author's home town of Webster Groves, Missouri, and countless similar towns. Values such as the love of nature are described as being related to traditional Protestant values, and as waning because of the decline of traditional religious belief.

Perhaps most important, Franzen explores the duality of solitude and interpersonal relationships. Primarily using his mother's death as a metaphor for all human relationships, Franzen concludes that although relationships are essential to our existence, we often fail to recognize and appreciate their importance at the time.

== Contents ==
- "House for Sale" (on the author's mother, sale of the family house)
- "Two Ponies" (on "Peanuts" by Charles Schulz)
- "Then Joy Breaks Through" (on Christian education)
- "Centrally Located"
- "The Foreign Language" (German, that is)
- "My Bird Problem" (the author's marriage, his birding hobby)

== Critical reception ==
In 2006, New York Times critic Michiko Kakutani called The Discomfort Zone "an odious self-portrait of the artist as a young jackass." Franzen subsequently called Kakutani "the stupidest person in New York City".

Marjorie Kehe of The Christian Science Monitor called the book a "whipsaw reading experience" that was both "sharply insightful and frustratingly obtuse".
