= Farther Away (book) =

English-language essay collection published in 2012

- First edition cover
- Author: Jonathan Franzen
- Language: English
- Genre: Essays
- Publisher: Farrar, Straus and Giroux
- Publication date: April 24, 2012
- Publication place: United States
- Media type: Print (Hardback)
- Pages: 356 pp (first edition, hardback)
- ISBN: 0-374-15357-4 (first edition, hardback)
- OCLC: 759175040
- Dewey Decimal: 814/.54 dc23
- LC Class: PS3556.R352 A6 2012

Farther Away is a 2012 collection of essays by the American writer Jonathan Franzen.

== Essays ==
Most of the essays previously appeared in The New Yorker, The New York Times, The Guardian, and others.

== Table of contents ==
- “Pain Won't Kill You” (2011)
- “Farther Away” (2011)
- “The Greatest Family Ever Storied” (2010)
- “Hornets” (2010)
- “The Ugly Mediterranean” (2010)
- “The Corn King” (2010)
- “On Autobiographical Fiction” (2009)
- “I Just Called To Say I Love You” (2008)
- “David Foster Wallace” (2008)
- “The Chinese Puffin” (2008)
- “On The Laughing Policeman” (2008)
- “Comma-Then” (2008)
- “Authentic But Horrible” (2007)
- “Interview With New York State” (2007)
- “Love Letters” (2005)
- “Our Little Planet” (2005)
- “The End Of The Binge” (2005)
- “What Makes You So Sure You're Not The Evil One Yourself?” (2004)
- “Our Relations : A Brief History” (2004)
- “The Man In The Gray Flannel Suit” (2002)
- “No End To It” (1998)

== Reception ==
In The New York Times Book Review, the essayist Phillip Lopate wrote that the pieces "demonstrate [Franzen's] generosity, humanity and love of fiction, as well as his own preference for the morally complex over the sentimental. The struggle to be a good human being, against the pulls of solipsism and narcissism, can be glimpsed in every page of these essays, which if nothing else offer a telling battle report from within the consciousness of one of our major novelists."

In the English newspaper The Guardian, writer and critic Geoff Dyer found advances over Franzen's previous essay collection, How to Be Alone: "Franzen seems more gregarious than he was in How to be Alone...These essays are exemplary instances of reader-friendly criticism in that they can be studied profitably even by people unfamiliar with the works in question. They also display [a] related side-effect of becoming a great novelist. That the great novelist is, by default, a great reader...One way or another, the essays in Farther Away are attempts to enlarge the place where literature, and the responsiveness to it, can be preserved."
