= How to Be Alone (book) =

Book by Jonathan Franzen

- First edition cover
- Author: Jonathan Franzen
- Language: English
- Genre: Essays
- Publisher: Farrar, Straus and Giroux
- Publication date: October 1, 2002
- Publication place: United States
- Media type: Print (Hardback & Paperback)
- Pages: 278 pp (first edition, hardback)
- ISBN: 0-374-17327-3 (first edition, hardback)
- OCLC: 49226197
- Dewey Decimal: 814/.54 21
- LC Class: PS3556.R352 H69 2002

How to Be Alone is a 2002 book collecting fourteen essays by American writer Jonathan Franzen.

== Essays ==
Most of the essays previously appeared in The New Yorker, Harper's Magazine, Details, and Graywolf Forum. In the introductory essay, "A Word About This Book," Franzen notes that the "underlying investigation in all these essays" is "the problem of preserving individuality and complexity in a noisy and distracting mass culture: the question of how to be alone."

== "The Harper's Essay" and "My Father's Brain" ==
Included in the collection are "Why Bother?"—a revised version of "Perchance to Dream," Franzen's infamous 1996 Harper's essay on the novelists' obligation to social realism—and "My Father's Brain," nominated for a 2002 National Magazine Award. The latter essay details the elder Franzen's struggle with Alzheimer's. These experiences informed Franzen’s writing of the character Alfred Lambert in his 2001 novel The Corrections.

== Later editions ==
The 2003 trade paperback edition includes a fifteenth essay, "Mr. Difficult", on the subject of "difficult" fiction in general and the novels of William Gaddis in particular. To accommodate this additional essay, the essay “Scavenging” was substantially edited.

== Table of contents ==
- "A Word About This Book"
- "My Father's Brain" (an edited version appeared in The Guardian; see External links)
- "Imperial Bedroom"
- "Why Bother?"
- "Lost in the Mail"
- "Erika Imports"
- "Sifting the Ashes"
- "The Reader in Exile"
- "First City"
- "Scavenging"
- "Control Units"
- "Books in Bed"
- "Meet Me in St. Louis"
- "Inauguration Day, January 2001"

Note: In the trade paperback edition "Mr. Difficult" was inserted after "Control Units".

== Reception ==
Janet Maslin, in The New York Times, called the book "captivating but uneven"—"this collection emphasizes [Franzen's] elegance, acumen and daring as an essayist, with an intellectually engaging self-awareness as formidable as Joan Didion's. He's funny, too." Maslin praised the essay "My Father's Brain" as "a tough, haunting account." In The New York Times Book Review, critic A.O. Scott discussed Franzen's, "calm, passionate critical authority." Scott closed,

"At present, in Franzen's humane, pessimistic view, our individuality is under assault from all quarters, and the novel is part of a web of modern institutions—along with the daily mail, the industrial city and the idea of a democratic public sphere—undermined by the irresistible (that is, both unstoppable and undeniably attractive) forces of standardization and privatization. To point this out is, inevitably, to sound like something of a crank, and the accomplishment of this book is to offer its cranky author and his like-minded readers a suitably contradictory and ambiguous consolation: we're not alone."
