= Michiko Kakutani =

American critic and writer (born 1955)

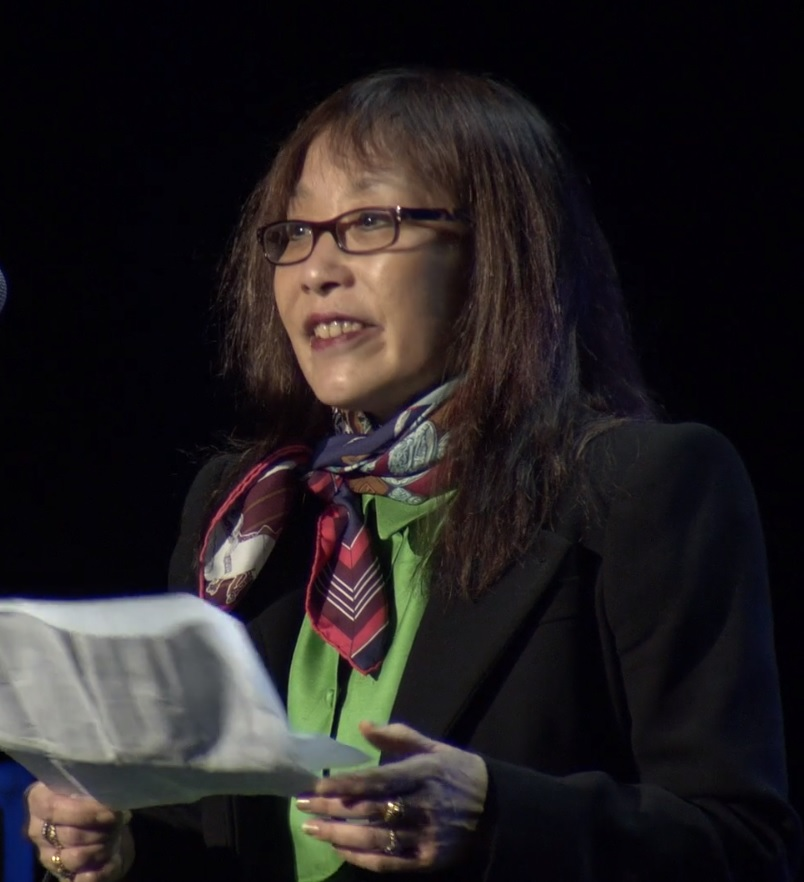
- Accepting the 2018 Tribeca Disruptive Innovation Award
- Born: January 9, 1955 (age 71); New Haven, Connecticut, U.S.
- Other name: Michi
- Education: Yale University (BA)
- Occupations: Critic; author; journalist
- Employers: The Washington Post (c. 1976–1977); Time (1977–1979); The New York Times (1979–2017)
- Parents: Shizuo Kakutani (father); Keiko Uchida (mother)
- Relatives: Yoshiko Uchida (aunt)
- Awards: Pulitzer Prize for Criticism (1998)

Michiko Kakutani (born January 9, 1955) is an American writer and retired literary critic, best known for reviewing books for The New York Times from 1983 to 2017. In that role, she won the Pulitzer Prize for Criticism in 1998.

== Early life and family ==
Kakutani, a Japanese American, was born on January 9, 1955, in New Haven, Connecticut. She is the only child of Yale mathematician Shizuo Kakutani and Keiko "Kay" Uchida. Her father was born in Japan, and her mother was a second-generation Japanese-American raised in Berkeley, California. Kakutani's aunt, Yoshiko Uchida, was an author of children's books. Kakutani received her bachelor's degree in English literature from Yale University in 1976.

== Career ==
Kakutani initially worked as a reporter for The Washington Post, and then from 1977 to 1979 for Time magazine. In 1979, she joined The New York Times as a reporter.

=== Literary critic ===
Kakutani was a literary critic for The New York Times from 1983 until her retirement in 2017. She gained particular notoriety for her sometimes-biting reviews of books from famous authors; Slate remarked that "her name became a verb, and publishers have referred to her negative reviews as 'getting Kakutani'ed'".

Multiple authors who had received such reviews gave harsh public responses. In 2006, Kakutani called Jonathan Franzen's The Discomfort Zone "an odious self-portrait of the artist as a young jackass"; Franzen subsequently called Kakutani "the stupidest person in New York City". In 2012, Kakutani wrote a negative review of Nassim Nicholas Taleb's Antifragile. In 2018, writing about reviewers that include Kakutani—whether about the Antifragile review, or otherwise—six years after Antifragile, Taleb stated:

someone has to have read the book to notice that a reviewer is full of baloney, so in the absence of skin in the game, reviewers such as Michiko Kakutani can go on forever without anyone knowing they are either fabricating or drunk (or, as I am certain, in the case of Kakutani, both)

Daniel Takeshi, an academic computer scientist, responded to Taleb: "If you can get used to Taleb's idiosyncratic and pompous writing style, such as mocking... Thomas L. Friedman... and insulting Michiko Kakutani... there's actually some nice insights". According to Kira Cochrane in The Guardian, such counterattacks may have bolstered Kakutani's reputation as commendably "fearless".

She has been known to write reviews in the voice of movie or book characters, including Brian Griffin, Austin Powers, Holden Caulfield, Elle Woods of Legally Blonde, and Truman Capote's character Holly Golightly in Breakfast at Tiffany's.

Kakutani announced that she was stepping down as chief book critic of the Times on July 27, 2017. In an article summarizing her book reviewing career, a writer in Vanity Fair called her "the most powerful book critic in the English-speaking world" and credited her with boosting the careers of George Saunders, Mary Karr, David Foster Wallace, Jonathan Franzen, Ian McEwan, Martin Amis, and Zadie Smith.

=== Later work ===
In 2018, Kakutani published a book criticizing the Trump administration, The Death of Truth: Notes on Falsehood in the Age of Trump. In it, Kakutani draws parallels between postmodern philosophy and the number of false or misleading statements made by Trump. In an interview for the book, she argued:

With its suspicion of grand, overarching narratives, postmodernism emphasized the role that perspective plays in shaping our readings of texts and events [...] and it opened the once-narrow gates of history to heretofore marginalized points of view. But as such, ideas seeped into popular culture and merged with the narcissism of the 'Me Decade' [and] also led to a more reductive form of relativism that allowed people to insist that their opinions were just as valid as objective truths verified by scientific evidence or serious investigative reporting".

Kakutani's second book, Ex-Libris: 100+ Books to Read and Re-Read, an essay collection about books that she considers personally and culturally influential, was published in 2020. The artist Dana Tanamachi designed the cover and illustrated thirty of the titles in the style of vintage-inspired bookplates.

In 2024, Kakutani published her third book, The Great Wave: The Era of Radical Disruption and the Rise of the Outsider.

== Personal life ==
Kakutani is a fan of the New York Yankees. As of 2018, she lives on the Upper West Side of Manhattan.

During her career at The New York Times, Kakutani developed a reputation as an extremely private person who was seldom seen in public, with articles describing her as "mysterious" and "reclusive". Shawn McCreesh, writing in New York magazine, said that "you were likelier to have seen a snow leopard in Manhattan than to meet Kakutani in the wild". Upon the publication of The Death of Truth, Kakutani gave interviews to print outlets and continued to decline to appear on television.

== Media references ==
- In "Critical Condition" (season 5, episode 6 of the HBO series Sex and the City), Kakutani reviews one of Carrie Bradshaw's books. As Carrie obsesses over the review, Miranda Hobbes states, "Just don't say her name again — it'll push me over the edge."
- Comedian and Saturday Night Live cast member Bowen Yang performed an impression of Kakutani during his audition for the show, later joking that she was perfect for an impression since many do not know what she looks or sounds like.

== Publications ==
- The Poet at the Piano: Portraits of Writers, Filmmakers, Playwrights, and Other Artists at Work. Times Books. 1988. ISBN 978-0812912777.
- The Death of Truth: Notes on Falsehood in the Age of Trump. Crown Publishing Group. 2018. ISBN 978-0525574828.
- Ex-Libris: 100+ Books to Read and Re-Read. Crown Publishing Group. 2020. ISBN 9780525574972.
- The Great Wave: The Era of Radical Disruption and the Rise of the Outsider. Crown Publishing Group. 2024. ISBN 9780525574996.

== Awards ==
- 1998: Pulitzer Prize for Criticism
