= Jonathan Franzen =

American writer (born 1959)

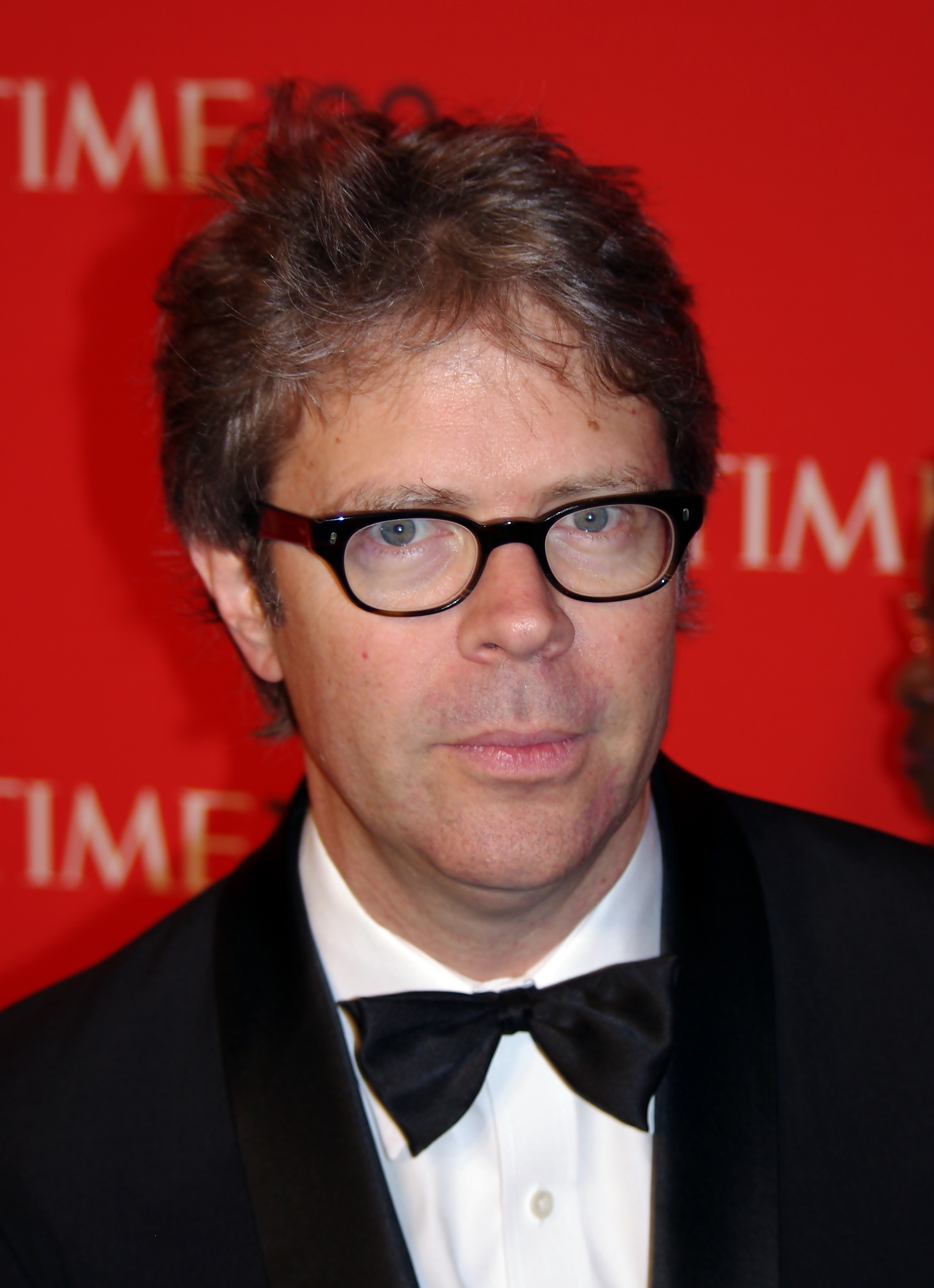
- Franzen at the 2011 Time 100 gala
- Born: Jonathan Earl Franzen; August 17, 1959 (age 67); Western Springs, Illinois, U.S.
- Education: Swarthmore College (BA)
- Occupations: Novelist, essayist
- Spouse: Valerie Cornell (divorced)
- Partner: Kathy Chetkovich
- Writing career
- Genre: Literary fiction
- Notable works: The Corrections (2001); Freedom (2010); Crossroads (2021)
- Notable awards: National Book Award; 2001; James Tait Black Memorial Prize; 2002
- Movements: Social realism, New Sincerity
- Website: jonathanfranzen.com

Jonathan Earl Franzen (born August 17, 1959) is an American novelist, essayist and short-story writer. His 2001 novel The Corrections drew widespread critical acclaim, earned Franzen a National Book Award, was a Pulitzer Prize for Fiction finalist, earned a James Tait Black Memorial Prize, and was shortlisted for the International Dublin Literary Award. His novel Freedom (2010) garnered similar praise and led to an appearance on the cover of Time magazine alongside the headline "Great American Novelist". Franzen's latest novel Crossroads was published in 2021, and is the first in a projected trilogy.

Franzen has contributed to The New Yorker magazine since 1994. His 1996 Harper's essay "Perchance to Dream" bemoaned the state of contemporary literature. Oprah Winfrey's book club selection in 2001 of The Corrections led to a much publicized feud with the talk show host.

== Early life and education ==
Franzen was born in Western Springs, Illinois, the son of Irene (née Super) and Earl T. Franzen. His father, raised in Minnesota, was the son of a Swedish immigrant; his mother's ancestry was Eastern European. Franzen grew up in an affluent neighborhood in the St. Louis suburb of Webster Groves, Missouri, and graduated with high honors from Swarthmore College, receiving a degree in German in 1981. As part of his undergraduate education, he studied abroad in Germany during the 1979–80 academic year with Wayne State University's Junior Year in Munich program. While there, he met Michael A. Martone, on whom he would later base the character Walter Berglund in Freedom. He also studied on a Fulbright Scholarship at Freie Universität Berlin in Berlin in 1981–82; he speaks fluent German.

Franzen married in 1982 and moved with his wife to Somerville, Massachusetts, to pursue a career as a novelist. While writing his first novel, The Twenty-Seventh City, he worked as a research assistant at Harvard University's Department of Earth and Planetary Sciences, coauthoring several dozen papers. In September 1987, a month after he and his wife moved to New York City, Franzen sold The Twenty-Seventh City to Farrar Straus & Giroux.

== Career ==
=== Early novels ===
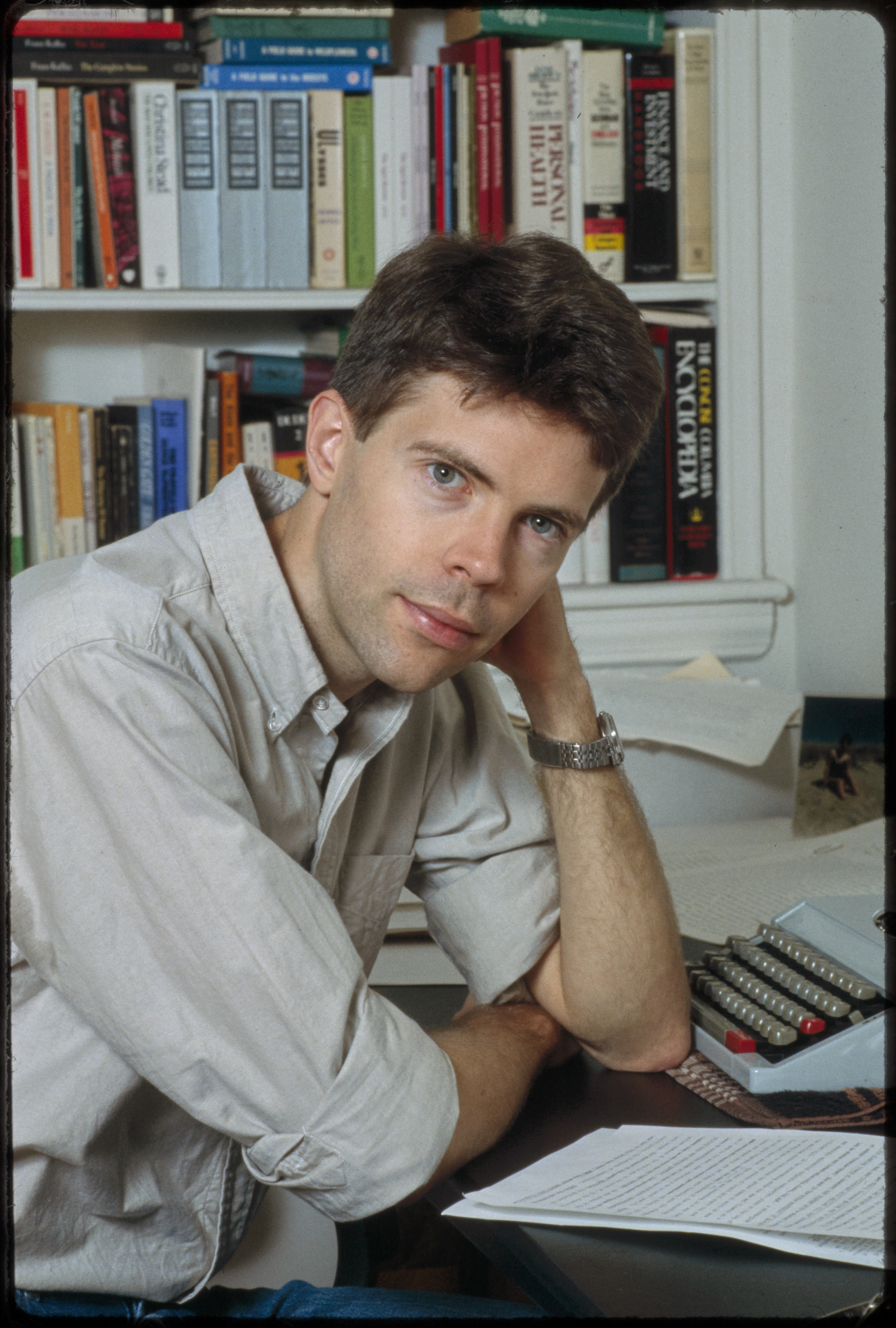
Franzen in 1988

The Twenty-Seventh City, published in 1988, is set in Franzen's hometown, St. Louis, and deals with the city's fall from grace, St. Louis having been the "fourth city" in the 1870s. This sprawling novel was warmly received and established Franzen as an author to watch. In a conversation with novelist Donald Antrim for Bomb Magazine, Franzen described The Twenty-Seventh City as "a conversation with the literary figures of my parents' generation[,] the great sixties and seventies Postmoderns", adding in a later interview "I was a skinny, scared kid trying to write a big novel. The mask I donned was that of a rhetorically airtight, extremely smart, extremely knowledgeable middle-aged writer."

Strong Motion (1992) focuses mainly on a dysfunctional family, the Hollands, and uses seismic events on the American East Coast as a metaphor for the quakes that occur in family life (as Franzen put it, "I imagined static lives being disrupted from without—literally shaken. I imagined violent scenes that would strip away the veneer and get people shouting angry moral truths at each other."). A 'systems novel', the key 'systems' of Strong Motion according to Franzen are "... the systems of science and religion—two violently opposing systems of making sense in the world." The novel was not a financial success at the time of its publication. Franzen subsequently defended the novel in his 2010 Paris Review interview, remarking "I think they [critics and readers] may be overlooking Strong Motion a little bit."

Franzen taught a fiction-writing seminar at Swarthmore in the spring of 1992 and 1994:

On that first day of class, Franzen wrote two words on the blackboard: "truth" and "beauty," and told his students that these were the goals of fiction. Haslett describes Franzen's classroom manner as "serious." "He meant what he said and didn't suffer fools gladly." But this seriousness was leavened by a "great relish for words and writing," adds Kathleen Lawton-Trask '96, a 1994 workshop student who is now a writer and high school English teacher. "People who teach fiction workshops aren't always starry-eyed about writing, but he was. He read our stories so closely that he often started class with a rundown of words that were not used quite correctly in stories from that week's workshop. (I still remember him explaining to us the difference between cement and concrete.) At the same time, he was eminently supportive and sympathetic; I don't remember those corrections ever feeling condescending."

For the 1992 class, Franzen invited David Foster Wallace to be a guest judge of the workshop pieces.

=== The Corrections ===
Franzen's The Corrections garnered considerable critical acclaim in the United States, winning both the 2001 National Book Award for Fiction and the 2002 James Tait Black Memorial Prize for fiction. The novel was also a finalist for the 2001 National Book Critics Circle Award for Fiction, the 2002 PEN/Faulkner Award, and the 2002 Pulitzer Prize for Fiction (won by Richard Russo for Empire Falls).

In September 2001, The Corrections was selected for Oprah Winfrey's book club. Franzen initially participated in the selection, sitting down for a lengthy interview with Oprah and appearing in B-roll footage in his hometown of St. Louis (described in an essay in How To Be Alone titled "Meet Me In St. Louis"). In October 2001, however, The Oregonian printed an article in which Franzen expressed unease with the selection. In an interview on National Public Radio's Fresh Air, he expressed his worry that the Oprah logo on the cover dissuaded men from reading the book:

I had some hope of actually reaching a male audience and I've heard more than one reader in signing lines now at bookstores say "If I hadn't heard you, I would have been put off by the fact that it is an Oprah pick. I figure those books are for women. I would never touch it." Those are male readers speaking. I see this as my book, my creation.

Soon afterward, Franzen's invitation to appear on Oprah's show was rescinded. Winfrey announced, "Jonathan Franzen will not be on the Oprah Winfrey show because he is seemingly uncomfortable and conflicted about being chosen as a book club selection. It is never my intention to make anyone uncomfortable or cause anyone conflict. We have decided to skip the dinner and we're moving on to the next book."

These events gained Franzen and his novel widespread media attention. The Corrections soon became one of the decade's best-selling works of literary fiction. At the National Book Award ceremony, Franzen said "I'd also like to thank Oprah Winfrey for her enthusiasm and advocacy on behalf of The Corrections."

Following the success of The Corrections and the publication of The Discomfort Zone and How to Be Alone, Franzen began work on his next novel. In the interim, he published two short stories in The New Yorker: "Breakup Stories", published November 8, 2004, concerned the disintegration of four relationships; and "Two's Company", published May 23, 2005, concerned a couple who write for TV, then split up.

In 2011, it was announced that Franzen would write a multi-part television adaptation of The Corrections in collaboration with The Squid and the Whale director Noah Baumbach for HBO. HBO has since passed on Corrections, citing "difficulty" in "adapting the book's challenging narrative, which moves through time and cuts forwards and back": that would be "difficult to sustain in a series and challenging for viewers to follow, hampering the potential show's accessibility."

In September 2019, The Corrections was voted sixteenth in a list of the 100 best books of the twenty-first century so far by writers and critics of the Guardian newspaper. A similar ranking compiled by the New York Times in 2024 put it in fifth place.

=== Freedom ===
External videos
- Presentation by Franzen on Freedom: A Novel at the Miami Book Fair International, November 21, 2010, C-SPAN

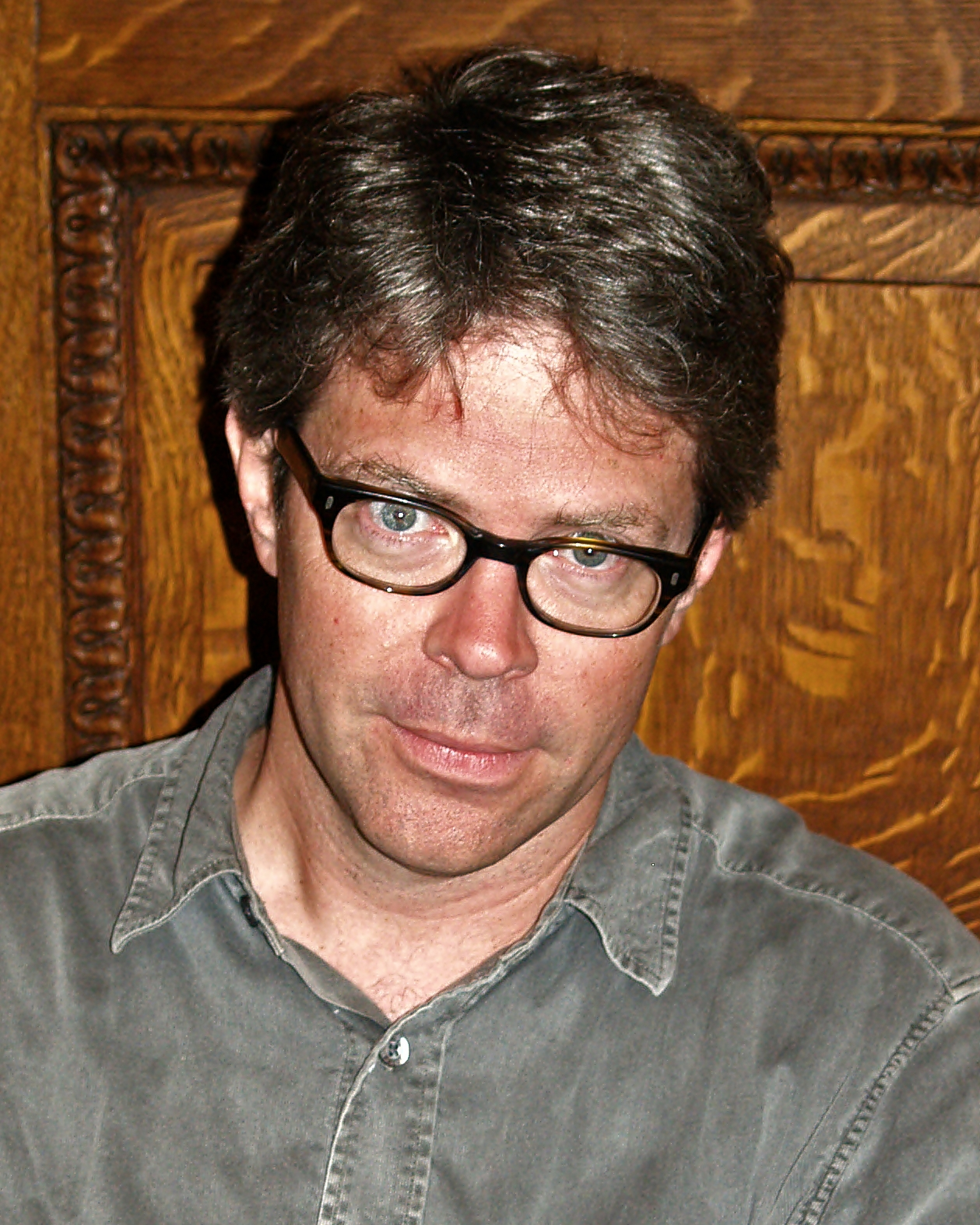
Franzen at the 2008 Brooklyn Book Festival

On June 8, 2009, Franzen published an excerpt from Freedom, his novel in progress, in The New Yorker. The excerpt, titled "Good Neighbors", concerned the trials and tribulations of a couple in St. Paul, Minnesota. On May 31, 2010, a second excerpt — titled "Agreeable" — was published, also in The New Yorker.

On October 16, 2009, Franzen made an appearance alongside David Bezmozgis at the New Yorker Festival at the Cedar Lake Theatre, reading a portion of his forthcoming novel. Sam Allard, writing for North By Northwestern about the event, said that the "...material from his new (reportedly massive) novel" was "as buoyant and compelling as ever" and "marked by his familiar undercurrent of tragedy". Franzen read "an extended clip from the second chapter."

On September 9, 2010, Franzen appeared on Fresh Air to discuss Freedom in the wake of its release. Franzen has drawn what he describes as a "feminist critique" for the attention that male authors receive over female authors—a critique he supports. Franzen also discussed his friendship with David Foster Wallace and the impact of Wallace's suicide on his writing process.

Freedom was the subject of a highly unusual "recall" in the United Kingdom starting in early October 2010. An earlier draft of the manuscript, to which Franzen had made over 200 changes, had been published by mistake. The publisher, HarperCollins, initiated an exchange program, but thousands of books had been distributed by that time.

While promoting the book, Franzen became the first American author to appear on the cover of Time magazine since Stephen King in 2000. Franzen appeared alongside the headline "Great American Novelist". He discussed the implications of the Time coverage, and the reasoning behind the title of Freedom in an interview in Manchester, England, in October 2010.

On September 17, 2010, Oprah Winfrey announced that Jonathan Franzen's Freedom would be an Oprah book club selection, the first of the last season of The Oprah Winfrey Show. On December 6, 2010, he appeared on The Oprah Winfrey Show to promote Freedom where they discussed that book and the controversy over his reservations about her picking The Corrections and what that would entail.

Franzen has stated the writing of Freedom was influenced by the death of his close friend and fellow novelist David Foster Wallace.

=== Purity ===
In an interview with Portland Monthly on December 18, 2012, Franzen revealed that he currently had "a four-page, single-spaced proposal" for a fifth novel he was currently working on, although he went on to suggest that while he had a proposal there was no guarantee that what was proposed would make the final cut, saying of similar proposals for previous novels, "I look at the old proposals now, and I see the one part of them that actually got made into a book, and I think, 'How come I couldn't see that? What is all this other stuff?'". Franzen also hinted that the new novel would probably also be long, adding "I've let go of any illusion that I'm a writer of 150-page novels. I need room to let things turn around over time and see them from the whole lives of other characters, not just the single character. For better or worse, one point of view never seems to do it for me." In October 2014, during a discussion at Colgate University, Franzen read a "self-contained first-person narrative" that is part of a novel that he hoped will be out in the summer of 2015.

On November 17, 2014, The New York Times Artsbeat Blog reported that the novel, titled Purity, would be out in September. Jonathan Galassi, president and publisher of Farrar, Straus & Giroux, described Purity as a multigenerational American epic that spans decades and continents. The story centers on a young woman named Purity Tyler, or Pip, who doesn't know who her father is and sets out to uncover his identity. The narrative stretches from contemporary America to South America to East Germany before the collapse of the Berlin Wall, and hinges on the mystery of Pip's family history and her relationship with a charismatic hacker and whistleblower.

In 2016, Daily Variety reported that the novel was in the process of being adapted into a 20-hour limited series for Showtime by Todd Field who would share writing duties with Franzen and the playwright Sir David Hare. It would star Daniel Craig as Andreas Wolf and be executive produced by Field, Franzen, Craig, Hare & Scott Rudin.

However, in a February 2018 interview with The Times London, Hare said that, given the budget for Field's adaptation (170 million), he doubted it would ever be made, but added "It was one of the richest and most interesting six weeks of my life, sitting in a room with Todd Field, Jonathan Franzen and Daniel Craig bashing out the story. They're extremely interesting people."

Purity was a relative commercial disappointment compared to Franzen's two previous novels, selling only 255,476 copies, compared to 1.15 million copies of Freedom and 1.6 million copies of The Corrections.

=== A Key to All Mythologies ===
On November 13, 2020, Franzen's publisher Farrar, Straus and Giroux announced the publication of Franzen's new novel, Crossroads, the first volume in a trilogy titled A Key to All Mythologies.

Crossroads was published October 5, 2021.

Bookforum called it Franzen's "finest novel yet," his "greatest and most perfect novel," and Dwight Garner of the New York Times said it was "warmer than anything he's yet written, wider in its human sympathies, weightier of image and intellect." According to the Times Literary Supplement:

Crossroads is largely free from the vices to which Franzen's previous work has been addicted: the self-conscious topicality; the show-off sophistication; the formal heavy-handedness. It retains many of his familiar virtues: the robust characterization; the escalating comedy; the virtuosic command of narrative rhythm.

Critics especially praised the character of Marion, whom Garner called "one of the glorious characters in recent American fiction."

The novel is about a pastor, his wife, and four children. It's split into two sections called 'Advent' and 'Easter.' Writing for The Nation, Rumaan Alam says "in Crossroads, every plotline leads to God."

On June 1, 2026, a short story titled "A Talent for Seeming", excerpted from the next installment of the trilogy, was published by The New Yorker. The story set in 1960s Montana focuses on a born-again Christian teenager who discovers her passion for acting, which in turn disrupts her beliefs and her relationships.

Franzen also revealed to The New Yorker in an interview that the main character in "A Talent for Seeming" will eventually cross paths with a member of the Hildebrandt family, connecting the story of Crossroads with his novel currently in progress.

=== Other works ===
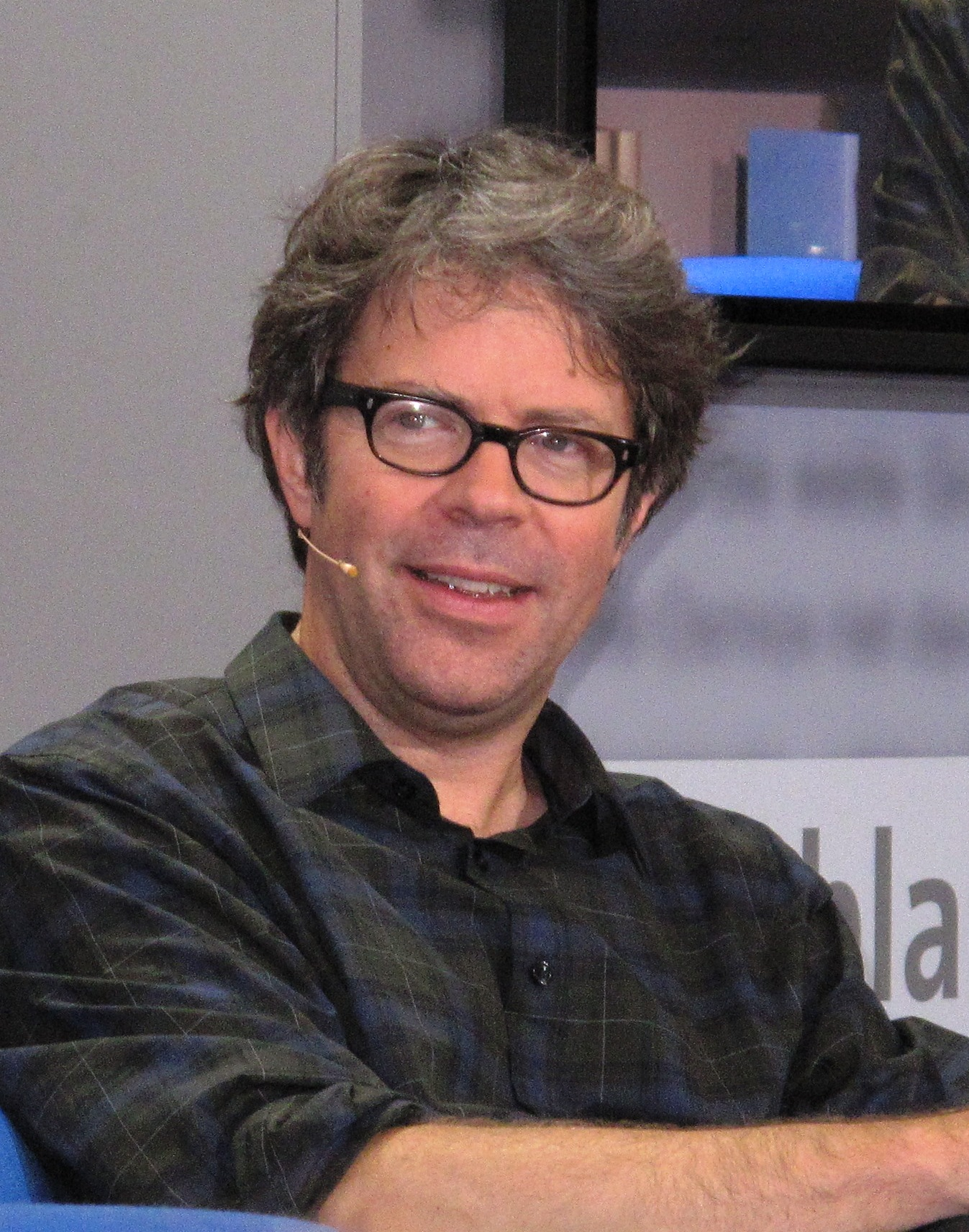
Franzen in 2010

In 1996, while still working on The Corrections, Franzen published a literary manifesto in Harper's Magazine entitled "Perchance to Dream". Referencing manifestos written by Philip Roth and Tom Wolfe, among others, Franzen grappled with the novelist's role in an advanced media culture which seemed to no longer need the novel. In the end, Franzen rejects the goal of writing a great social novel about issues and ideas, in favor of focusing on the internal lives of characters and their emotions. Given the huge success of The Corrections, this essay offers a prescient look into Franzen's goals as both a literary and commercially minded author.

In 2002, Franzen published a critique of the novels of William Gaddis, entitled "Mr. Difficult", in The New Yorker. He begins by recounting how some readers felt The Corrections was spoiled by being too high-brow in parts, and summarizes his own views of reading difficult fiction. He proposes a "Status model", whereby the point of fiction is to be Art, and also a "Contract model", whereby the point of fiction is to be Entertainment, and finds that he subscribes to both models. He praises The Recognitions, admits that he only got halfway through J R, and explains why he does not like the rest of Gaddis's novels.

In 2004, Franzen published "The Discomfort Zone", a personal essay about his childhood and family life in Missouri and his love of Charles M. Schulz's Peanuts, in The New Yorker. Susan Orlean selected it for the subsequent volume of The Best American Essays.

External videos
- Presentation by Franzen on The Discomfort Zone at the Miami Book Fair International, November 18, 2006, C-SPAN

Since The Corrections Franzen has published How to Be Alone (2002), a collection of essays including "Perchance To Dream", and The Discomfort Zone (2006), a memoir. How To Be Alone is essentially an apologia for reading, articulating Franzen's uncomfortable relationship with the place of fiction in contemporary society. It also probes the influence of his childhood and adolescence on his creative life, which is then further explored in The Discomfort Zone.

In September 2007, Franzen's translation of Frank Wedekind's play Spring Awakening (German: Frühlings Erwachen) was published. In his introduction, Franzen describes the Broadway musical version as "insipid" and "overpraised." In an interview with New York magazine, Franzen stated that he had in fact made the translation for Swarthmore College's theater department for $50 in 1986 and that it had sat in a drawer for 20 years since. After the Broadway show stirred up so much interest, Franzen said he was inspired to publish it because "I knew it was a good translation, better than anything else out there."

Franzen published a social commentary on cell phones, sentimentality, and the decline of public space, "I Just Called To Say I Love You" (2008), in the September/October 2008 issue of MIT Technology Review.

In 2012 he published Farther Away, a collection of essays dealing with such topics as his love of birds, his friendship with David Foster Wallace, and his thoughts on technology.

In 2013, Franzen published The Kraus Project. It consists of three major essays by the "Perennially ... impossible to translate" Austrian "playwright, poet, social commentator and satirical genius" Karl Kraus – "Heine and the Consequences" a takedown of the beloved German poet, "Nestroy and Posterity" which established that playwright's reputation in Austria to this day, and "Afterword to Heine and the Consequences"". The essays are accompanied by "Franzen's [own] plentiful, trenchant yet off-beat annotations" taking on "... Kraus' mantle-commenting on what Kraus would say (and what Franzen's opinion is) about Macs and PCs; decrying Twitter's claim of credit for the Arab Spring; and unfurling how media conglomerates influence politics in their quest for profits."

Franzen published his third essay collection, The End of the End of the Earth: Essays, in November 2018. According to advance press for the book, the collection "gathers essays and speeches written mostly in the past five years, [and] Jonathan Franzen returns with renewed vigor to the themes—both human and literary—that have long preoccupied him. Whether exploring his complex relationship with his uncle, recounting his young adulthood in New York, or offering an illuminating look at the global seabird crisis, these pieces contain all the wit and disabused realism that we've come to expect from Franzen. Taken together, these essays trace the progress of a unique and mature mind wrestling with itself, with literature, and with some of the most important issues of our day, made more pressing by the current political milieu. The End of the End of the Earth is remarkable, provocative, and necessary."

In September 2019, Franzen published an essay on climate change in The New Yorker entitled "What If We Stopped Pretending?", which generated controversy among scientists and online pundits because of its alleged pessimism. The term doomerism became popular amid the response to the piece. A Sierra Club interview with Franzen, from January 2019 further explores Franzen's feelings about climate change and action.

In an interview with Transatlantica conducted in March 2018, Franzen mentioned that he had just started work on a new novel, having recently sold it to publishers on the basis of a three-page proposal. Later that year, in a profile piece for The New York Times Magazine in June 2018, Franzen confirmed that he was currently at work on the early stages of his sixth novel, which he speculated could be his last. "So, I may be wrong ... But somehow this new one really does feel like my last.". Subsequently, in an interview reproduced on The Millions website in April 2020, Franzen mentioned that he was "almost done" with writing this sixth novel. Crossroads: A Novel was published on October 5, 2021.

== Philosophy of writing ==
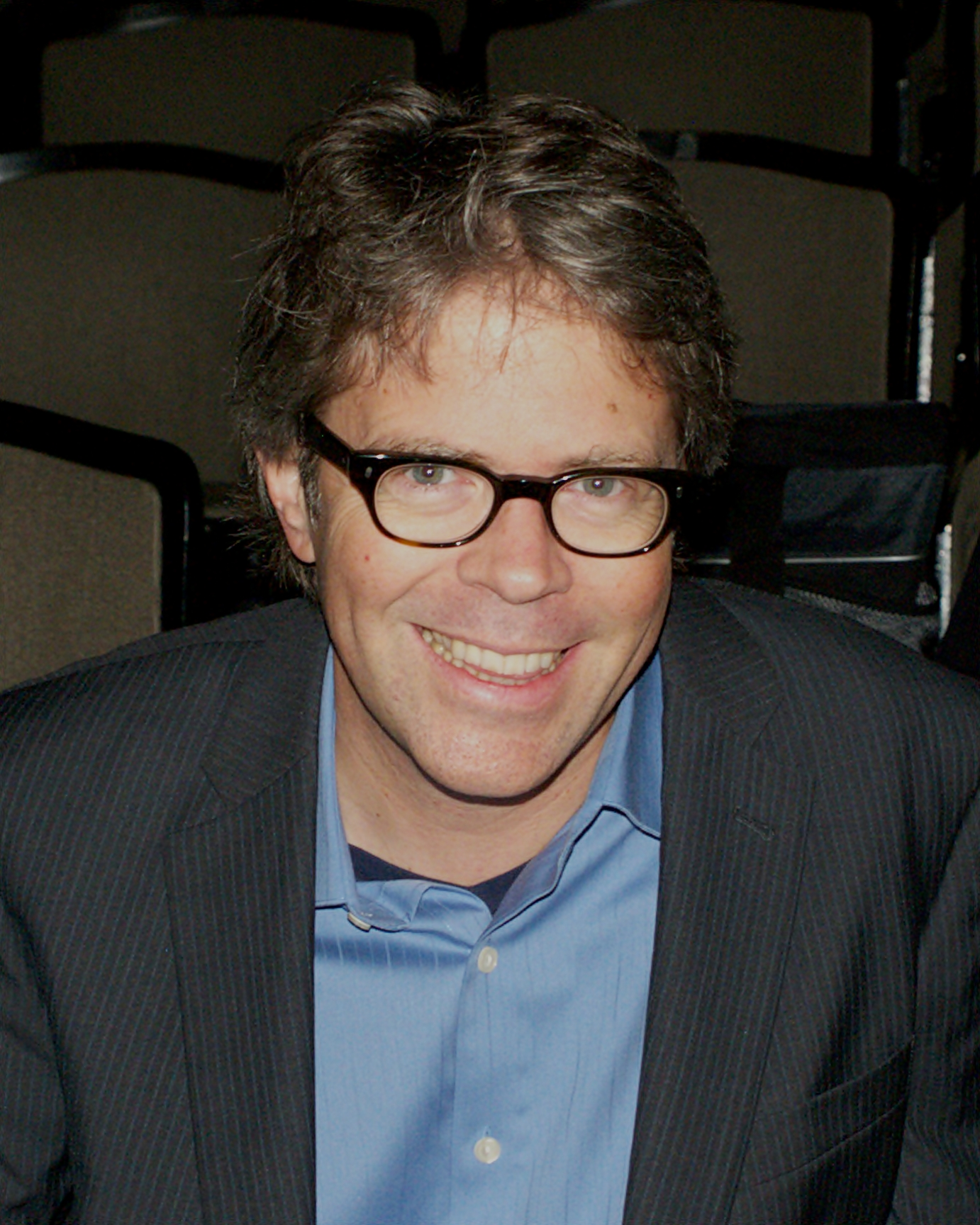
Franzen at the 2010 National Book Critics Circle awards

In February 2010, Franzen (along with writers such as Richard Ford, Margaret Atwood, and Anne Enright) was asked by The Guardian to contribute what he believed were ten serious rules to abide by for aspiring writers. His rules included treating the reader as a friend, and avoiding the Internet.

== Personal life ==
In 1982, when in his early twenties, Franzen married fellow writer Valerie Cornell. They lived in New York City and were married for fourteen years. His marriage and divorce are mentioned in some of his essays in the collection Farther Away.

Franzen lives in Santa Cruz, California, with his "spouse-equivalent", writer Kathy Chetkovich.

As first reported in his essay "My Bird Problem," Franzen is well known as a serious birdwatcher. He appeared on CBS Sunday Morning in March 2018 to discuss his love of birds and birdwatching. Franzen served for nine years on the board of the American Bird Conservancy. A feature-length documentary based on Franzen's essay "Emptying the Skies" was released in 2013.

Franzen is a longtime fan of the punk-rock collective The Mekons; he appeared in the 2014 documentary Revenge of the Mekons to discuss the group's importance to him.

In 2010, at an event at the Serpentine Pavilion in London celebrating the launch of Freedom, Franzen's glasses were stolen from his face by a gate-crasher, who jokingly attempted to ransom them for $100,000 before being apprehended by police elsewhere in Hyde Park.

== Awards and honors ==
=== Honors ===
- 1981 Fulbright Scholarship to Germany
- 1988 Whiting Award
- 1996 Guggenheim Fellowship
- 2000 Berlin Prize (American Academy in Berlin)
- 2012 Carlos Fuentes Medal (Inaugural award)
- 2015 Budapest Grand Prize
- 2015 Euronatur Award for outstanding commitment to nature conservation in Europe
- 2017 Frank Schirrmacher Preis
- 2022 Thomas Mann Prize

=== Literary awards ===
Year	Novel	Award	Category	Result	Ref.
2001	The Corrections	Bad Sex in Fiction Award	—	Shortlisted	
2001	The Corrections	Los Angeles Times Book Prize	Fiction	Shortlisted	
2001	The Corrections	National Book Award	Fiction	Won	
2001	The Corrections	National Book Critics Circle Award	Fiction		
2001	The Corrections	Salon Book Award	Fiction	Won	
2002	The Corrections	Audie Award	Fiction, Abridged	Won	
2002	The Corrections	Indies Choice Book Awards	Adult Fiction	Honor Book	
2002	The Corrections	James Tait Black Memorial Prize	Fiction	Won	
2002	The Corrections	PEN/Faulkner Award for Fiction	—	Shortlisted	
2002	The Corrections	Pulitzer Prize	Fiction	Finalist	
2003	The Corrections	International Dublin Literary Award	—	Shortlisted	

- 2010 Galaxy National Book Awards, International Author of the Year, Freedom
- 2010 Los Angeles Times Book Prize (Fiction) finalist (for Freedom)
- 2010 National Book Critics Circle Award finalist (for Freedom)
- 2010 Salon Book Award (Fiction) for Freedom
- 2011 Chicago Tribune Heartland Prize for Freedom
- 2011 John Gardner Award (Fiction) for Freedom
- 2013 National Book Critics Circle Award (Criticism) shortlist for The Kraus Project

Honors and other recognition

- 1996 Granta's Best of Young American Novelists
- 2001 Oprah's Book Club Selection (for The Corrections)
- 2001 The New York Times Best Books of the Year for The Corrections
- 2009 Richard C. Holbrooke Distinguished Visitor American Academy in Berlin
- 2010 Oprah's Book Club selection (for Freedom)
- 2010 The New York Times 100 Notable Books of 2010 list (for Freedom)
- 2010 The New York Times Best Books of the Year (for Freedom)
- 2010 Elected to the Akademie der Kunste, Berlin
- 2011 Named one of Time's Time 100
- 2012 Elected to the American Academy of Arts and Letters
- 2012 Elected to the French Ordre des Arts et des Lettres
- In January 2011, The Observer named him as one of "20 activists, filmmakers, writers, politicians and celebrities who will be setting the global environmental agenda in the coming year".
- On May 21, 2011, Franzen delivered the commencement address at Kenyon College to the class of 2011.
- On June 16, 2012, Franzen delivered the commencement address at Cowell College, UC Santa Cruz
- 2013 Welt-Literaturpreis
- The first international academic symposium solely dedicated to Franzen's work took place at Glasgow University, UK, March 22, 2013. Another one, "Jonathan Franzen: Identity and Crisis of the American Novel", was scheduled to take place at the University of Córdoba, Spain, April 18–19, 2013.

== Television appearances ==
- In 1996, Franzen appeared on Charlie Rose with friend and fellow author David Foster Wallace and author Mark Leyner to debate "The Future of American Fiction."
- In 2001, Franzen appeared on Charlie Rose, on November 21, 2001 to discuss The Corrections; and again on December 27 after winning the National Book Award for The Corrections.
- In 2002, Franzen appeared on Charlie Rose (October 30, 2002) to discuss his essay collection How to Be Alone.
- In 2006, Franzen guest starred alongside Michael Chabon, Tom Wolfe, and Gore Vidal in The Simpsons episode "Moe'N'a Lisa", which first aired November 19, 2006. In the episode, he is depicted fighting over literary influences with Chabon.
- In 2010, Franzen appeared on The Oprah Winfrey Show in support of her selection of Freedom for Oprah's Book Club. Several viewers noted the brevity of Franzen's appearance on the show, although a thirty-minute "After the Show" Q&A was later made available online.
- In 2015, Franzen appeared on The Late Show with Stephen Colbert and CBS This Morning to promote the release of Purity.
- In 2016, Franzen appeared on Jeopardy! as part of the show's Power Players Week, where journalists and intellectuals compete on the show with winnings donated to the player's charity of choice—Franzen played for the American Bird Conservancy. Franzen also appeared on Late Night with Seth Meyers.
- In 2018, Franzen appeared on CBS This Morning – Saturday to discuss his love of birds and birdwatching.

== Works ==
=== Novels ===
- Franzen, Jonathan (1988). The Twenty–Seventh City. New York: Farrar, Straus and Giroux.
- — (1992). Strong Motion. New York: Farrar, Straus and Giroux.
- — (2001). The Corrections. New York: Farrar, Straus and Giroux.
- — (2010). Freedom. New York: Farrar, Straus and Giroux.
- — (2015). Purity. New York: Farrar, Straus and Giroux.
- — (2021). Crossroads. New York: Farrar, Straus and Giroux.

=== Short fiction ===
- Franzen, Jonathan (1987). "Facts". Fiction International. Vol. 17, no. 1.
- — (1991). "Argilla Road". Grand Street. No. 39. pp. 180–208. doi:10.2307/25007495. JSTOR 25007495.
- — (1992). "Somewhere North of Wilmington". Blind Spot. No. 8. p. 116.
- — (1996). "How He Came to be Nowhere". Granta. Vol. 54. pp. 111–123.
- — (1996). "Chez Lambert". The Paris Review. No. 139. pp. 29–41.
- — (1998). "On the Nordic Pleasurelines Fall Color Cruise". Conjunctions. 30 (30): 333–341. JSTOR 24515848.
- — (July 5, 1999). "The Failure". The New Yorker.
- — (1999). "At the Party for the Artists with No Last Name". Blind Spot. No. 14.
- — (April 2000). "The Fall". Harper's Magazine.
- — (March 25, 2003). "When the new wing broke away from the old mansion". The Guardian.
- — (November 8, 2004). "Breakup Stories". The New Yorker: 85–99.
- — (May 23, 2005). "Two's Company". The New Yorker: 78–81.
- — (June 8, 2009). "Good Neighbors". The New Yorker.
- — (May 31, 2010). "Agreeable". The New Yorker.
- — (Spring 2011). "Ambition". Timothy McSweeney's Quarterly Concern. No. 37. ISBN 978-1-934781-86-9.
- — (June 8, 2015). "The Republic of Bad Taste". The New Yorker.

=== Non-fiction ===
- Franzen, Jonathan (April 1996). "Why Bother?" Harper's Magazine.
- Franzen, Jonathan (2002). How to Be Alone. New York: Farrar, Straus and Giroux. ISBN 0-374-17327-3. Essays.
- — (September 30, 2002). "Mr. Difficult: William Gaddis and the Problem of Hard-to-Read Books." The New Yorker.
- — (2006). The Discomfort Zone. New York: Farrar, Straus and Giroux. ISBN 0-374-29919-6. Memoir.
- — (2012). Farther Away. New York: Farrar, Straus and Giroux. ISBN 978-0-374-15357-1. Essays.
- — (February 13–20, 2012). "A Rooting Interest". The New Yorker. 88 (1): 60–65.
- — (April 6, 2015). "Carbon Capture: Has climate change made it harder for people to care about conservation?". Dept. of the Environment. The New Yorker. 91 (7): 56–65. (Note: Online version is titled "Climate change vs. conservation".)
- —, ed. (2016). The Best American Essays 2016. Houghton Mifflin Harcourt. ISBN 9780544812109. Guest editor.
- — (May 23, 2016). "The End of the End of the World". Our Far–Flung Correspondents. The New Yorker. 92 (15): 44–55.
- — (2018). The End of the End of the Earth: Essays. New York: Farrar, Straus and Giroux. ISBN 9780374147938. Essays.
- — (January 2018). "Why Birds Matter". National Geographic. Vol. 233, no. 1. pp. 32–43. Archived from the original on January 3, 2018.
- — (September 8, 2019). "What If We Stopped Pretending?". The New Yorker.

=== Translations ===
- Spring Awakening by Frank Wedekind 2007
- The Kraus Project (essays by Karl Kraus translated and annotated by Franzen) 2013
- The Short End of Sonnenallee with Jenny Watson by Thomas Brussig
