= The Corrections =

2001 novel by Jonathan Franzen

- First edition cover
- Author: Jonathan Franzen
- Cover artist: Jacket design by Lynn Buckley. Photograph: Willinger / FPG
- Language: English
- Publisher: Farrar, Straus and Giroux
- Publication date: September 1, 2001
- Publication place: United States
- Media type: Print (hardback and paperback)
- Pages: 568 pp (first hardcover edition)
- ISBN: 0-374-12998-3
- OCLC: 46858728
- Dewey Decimal: 813/.54 21
- LC Class: PS3556.R352 C67 2001

The Corrections is a 2001 novel by American author Jonathan Franzen. It revolves around the troubles of an elderly Midwestern couple and their three adult children, tracing their lives from the mid-20th century to "one last Christmas" together near the turn of the millennium. The novel was awarded the National Book Award in 2001 and the James Tait Black Memorial Prize in 2002.

The novel received wide acclaim from literary critics for its characterization and prose. While the novel's release preceded the September 11 terrorist attacks by ten days, many have interpreted The Corrections as having prescient insight into the major concerns and general mood of post-9/11 American life, and it has been listed in multiple publications as one of the greatest novels of the 21st century.

== Plot summary ==
The novel shifts back and forth through the late 20th century, intermittently following spouses Alfred and Enid Lambert as they raise their children Gary, Chip, and Denise in the traditional Midwestern suburb of St. Jude, and the lives of each family member as the three children grow up, distancing themselves and living on the East Coast. Alfred, a rigid and strict patriarch who worked as a railroad engineer, has developed Parkinson's and shows increasingly unmanageable symptoms of dementia. Enid takes out her frustrations with him by attempting to impose her traditional judgments on her adult children's lives, to their annoyance.

The middle son, Chip, is an unemployed academic living in New York City following his termination as a tenure-track university professor due to a sexual relationship with a student. Living on borrowed money from Denise, Chip works obsessively on a screenplay, but finds no success or motivation to pay off his debts. Following a rejection of his screenplay, Chip takes a job from his girlfriend's estranged husband Gitanas, a friendly but corrupt Lithuanian government official, later moving to Vilnius and working to defraud American investors over the Internet.

The elder son and oldest child, Gary, is a successful but increasingly depressive and alcoholic banker living in Philadelphia with his wife, Caroline, and their three young sons. When Enid attempts to persuade Gary to bring his family to St. Jude for Christmas, Caroline is reluctant, and turns Gary's sons against him and Enid, worsening his depressive tendencies. In return, Gary attempts to force his parents to move to Philadelphia so that Alfred may undergo an experimental neurological treatment that he and Denise learn about.

Also living in Philadelphia, their youngest child Denise finds growing success as an executive chef despite Enid's disapproval, and is commissioned to open a new restaurant. Simultaneously impulsive and a workaholic, Denise begins affairs with both her boss and his wife, and though the restaurant is successful, she is fired when the affairs are uncovered. Flashbacks to her childhood show her responding to her repressed upbringing by beginning an affair with one of her father's subordinates, a married railroad signals worker.

As Alfred's condition worsens, Enid attempts to manipulate all of her children into going to St. Jude for Christmas, with increasing desperation. Initially only Gary (without his wife or children) and Denise are present, while Chip is delayed by a violent political conflict in Lithuania, eventually arriving late after being attacked and robbed of all his savings. Denise inadvertently discovers that her father had known of her teenaged affair with his subordinate, and had kept his knowledge a secret to protect her privacy, at great personal cost. After a disastrous Christmas morning together, the three children are dismayed by their father's condition, and Alfred is finally moved into a nursing home.

Following the Christmas gathering, Chip stays in the Midwest, eventually starting a family with Alfred's doctor. Denise moves away from Philadelphia, and while Gary undergoes no drastic changes, Enid's newfound freedom from her husband causes her to be happier and less critical of her children's lives.

== Style and interpretations ==
With The Corrections, Franzen moved away from the postmodernism of his earlier novels and towards literary realism. In a conversation with novelist Donald Antrim for Bomb, Franzen said of this stylistic change, "Simply to write a book that wasn't dressed up in a swashbuckling, Pynchon-sized megaplot was enormously difficult." Critics pointed out many similarities between Franzen's childhood in St. Louis and the novel, but the work is not an autobiography. Franzen said in an interview that "the most important experience of my life ... is the experience of growing up in the Midwest with the particular parents I had. I feel as if they couldn’t fully speak for themselves, and I feel as if their experience—by which I mean their values, their experience of being alive, of being born at the beginning of the century and dying towards the end of it, that whole American experience they had—[is] part of me. One of my enterprises in the book is to memorialize that experience, to give it real life and form." The novel also focuses on topics such as the multi-generational transmission of family dysfunction and the waste inherent in today's consumer economy, and each of the characters "embody the conflicting consciousnesses and the personal and social dramas of our era." Influenced by Franzen's life, the novel in turn influenced it; during its writing, he said in 2002, he moved "away from an angry and frightened isolation toward an acceptance – even a celebration – of being a reader and a writer."

In a Newsweek feature on American culture during the George W. Bush administration, Jennie Yabroff said that despite being released less than a year into Bush's term and before the September 11 attacks, The Corrections "anticipates almost eerily the major concerns of the next seven years." According to Yabroff, a study of The Corrections demonstrates that much of the apprehension and disquiet that is seen as characteristic of the Bush era and post-9/11 America actually predated both. In this way, the novel is both characteristic of its time and prophetic of things to come; for Yabroff, even the controversy with Oprah, which saw Franzen branded an "elitist," was symptomatic of the subsequent course of American culture, with its increasingly prominent anti-elitist strain. She argues that The Corrections stands above later novels which focus on similar themes, because unlike its successors it addresses these themes without being "hamstrung by the 9/11 problem" which preoccupied Bush-era novels by writers such as Don DeLillo, Jay McInerney, and Jonathan Safran Foer.

== Reception ==
=== Critical reviews ===
Critic John Leonard praised the novel’s exploration of the generation gap and intergenerational dynamics, stating it reminds readers "why you read serious fiction in the first place."

=== Awards and recognition ===
The Corrections won the 2001 National Book Award for Fiction, the 2002 James Tait Black Memorial Prize, and was a finalist for the 2002 Pulitzer Prize for Fiction, as well as the 2001 National Book Critics Circle Award for Fiction and the 2002 PEN/Faulkner Award for Fiction. It was also shortlisted for the 2003 International Dublin Literary Award.

In 2005, The Corrections was included in Time magazine's list of the 100 best English-language novels since 1923.

In 2006, Bret Easton Ellis called it "one of the three great books of my generation." In 2009, the website The Millions polled 48 writers, critics, and editors, including Joshua Ferris, Sam Anderson, and Lorin Stein; the panel voted The Corrections the best novel since 2000 "by a landslide."

The novel was selected for Oprah's Book Club in 2001. However, Franzen publicly expressed ambivalence about the selection, criticizing its association with what he viewed as "schmaltzy" books. As a result, Oprah Winfrey rescinded his invitation to appear on The Oprah Winfrey Show.

Entertainment Weekly included The Corrections in its end-of-the-decade "best-of" list, stating, "Forget all the Oprah hoo-ha: Franzen's 2001 doorstop of a domestic drama teaches that, yes, you can go home again. But you might not want to."

== Adaptations ==
=== Scrapped film ===
In August 2001, producer Scott Rudin optioned the film rights to The Corrections for Paramount Pictures. The rights still have not yet been turned into a completed film.

In 2002, the film was said to be in pre-production, with Stephen Daldry attached to direct and dramatist David Hare working on the screenplay. In October 2002, Franzen gave Entertainment Weekly a wish list for the cast of the film, saying, "If they told me Gene Hackman was going to do Alfred, I would be delighted. If they told me they had cast Cate Blanchett as [Alfred's daughter] Denise, I would be jumping up and down, even though officially I don't care what they do with the movie."

In January 2005, Variety announced that, with Daldry presumably off the project, Robert Zemeckis was developing Hare's script "with an eye toward directing." In August 2005, Variety confirmed that the director would be helming The Corrections. Around this time, it was rumored that the cast would include Judi Dench as the family matriarch Enid, along with Brad Pitt, Tim Robbins and Naomi Watts as her three children. In January 2007, Variety wrote that Hare was still at work on the film's screenplay.

=== Television series ===
==== HBO pilot ====
In September 2011, it was announced that Rudin and the screenwriter and director Noah Baumbach were preparing The Corrections as a "drama series project," to potentially co-star Anthony Hopkins and air on HBO. Baumbach and Franzen collaborated on the screenplay, which Baumbach would direct. In 2011, it was reported that Chris Cooper and Dianne Wiest would star in the HBO adaptation. In November 2011, it was confirmed that Ewan McGregor had joined the cast. In a March 7, 2012, interview, McGregor confirmed that work on the film was "about a week" in and noted that both Dianne Wiest and Maggie Gyllenhaal were among the cast members. But on May 1, 2012, HBO decided not to pick up the pilot for a full series.

==== Netflix series ====
In April 2026, Netflix ordered a limited series adaptation, with Meryl Streep set to star as Enid Lambert. Cord Jefferson, director of American Fiction, is directing the series with Franzen adapting the novel. Streep’s attachment to the project dates to 2024, when it was in development at CBS Studios. Jefferson, Streep, and producers Mark Roybal and Paul Lee serve as executive producers, with the series produced by Paramount Television Studios.

=== Radio ===
In January 2015, the BBC broadcast a 15-part radio dramatization of the work. The series of 15-minute episodes, adapted by Marcy Kahan and directed by Emma Harding, also starred Richard Schiff (The West Wing), Maggie Steed (The Imaginarium of Doctor Parnassus), Colin Stinton (Rush, The Bourne Ultimatum) and Julian Rhind-Tutt (Lucy, Rush, Notting Hill). The series was part of BBC Radio 4's 15 Minute Drama "classic and contemporary original drama and book dramatisations".
