= Flex-Deon Blake =

American gay pornographic actor

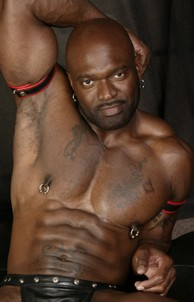
- Blake in 2004
- Born: Kevin Moss; April 25, 1962; Miami, Florida, U.S.
- Died: March 1, 2021 (aged 58)
- Height: 5 ft 10 in (1.78 m)
- Spouse: Paula Moss (m. 1982–1992)

Flex-Deon Blake (born Kevin Lorenzo Moss; April 25, 1962 – March 1, 2021) was an American-French gay pornographic actor who has appeared in gay pornographic films, gay pornographic magazines, and on websites. He starred in several bareback productions, including the controversial film Niggas' Revenge. In 2004, he was inducted into the Grabby Awards "Wall of Fame."

== Early life and education ==
Blake joined the US Air Force after high school, serving for 13 years until he was honorably discharged in 1992. He then pursued a degree in piano at Florida A&M University before finding employment as a correctional officer.

== Gay pornographic career ==
According to the Internet Movie Database, between 1995 and 2005 Flex-Deon Blake appeared in 42 gay pornographic films. This list includes mainstream productions such as Bacchus's Black Workout 10 as well as more controversial movies, such as SX Video's Barebacking with Jeff Palmer, vol. 3, in which Blake co-starred with the well-known gay performer Jeff Palmer. In 2001, Blake appeared in Dick Wadd's film Niggas' Revenge, which the Dick Wadd website describes as "a film so controversial that many stores won't carry it." Niggas' Revenge enacts the rape and sexual humiliation of a group of neo-Nazi skinheads by three African-American brothers whose rage the neo-Nazis provoked by their racist actions.

As a subject of Gay Studies

The film Niggas' Revenge, and Flex-Deon Blake's role in it, have become the subject of academic discussion. In his book, Unlimited Intimacy: Reflections on the Subculture of Barebacking, Tim Dean, a professor at the University at Buffalo, treats Niggas' Revenge in detail because of the way in which it fetishizes the simultaneous transgression of a number of taboos, all in order, Dean argues, to "conjure the transgressive charge of unprotected anal sex among gay men." The representation of interracial sex, rape, violence, and incest (between Chris Blake and Bobby Blake) is enhanced by what Dean calls Flex-Deon Blake's "phallicized" appearance:

[The African-American performers] are heavily pierced and tattooed, especially Flex-Deon Blake, who, in addition to pierced ears, eyebrow, nipples, and navel, sports a formidable Prince Albert through the head of his penis. The thick silver hoops that adorn his body are complemented by the chain-link harness that he dons for the sex scenes, along with black leather boots …

== Personal life ==
Flex-Deon Blake was the long-term partner of the well-known black gay pornographic actor Bobby Blake. The latter referred Flex-Deon to the adult industry producer Edward James. The story is part of Bobby's book, My Life in Porn. Flex-Deon Blake, in rediscovering his Christian roots, founded the Dallas-based "BrothasNDaSpirit", a ministry that helps all people resolve any conflict between Christian spirituality and someone's sexual orientation.

Flex-Deon Blake died on March 1, 2021 at the age of 58.

== See also ==
- List of male performers in gay porn films
