= Bugchasing =

Seeking HIV infection through sex

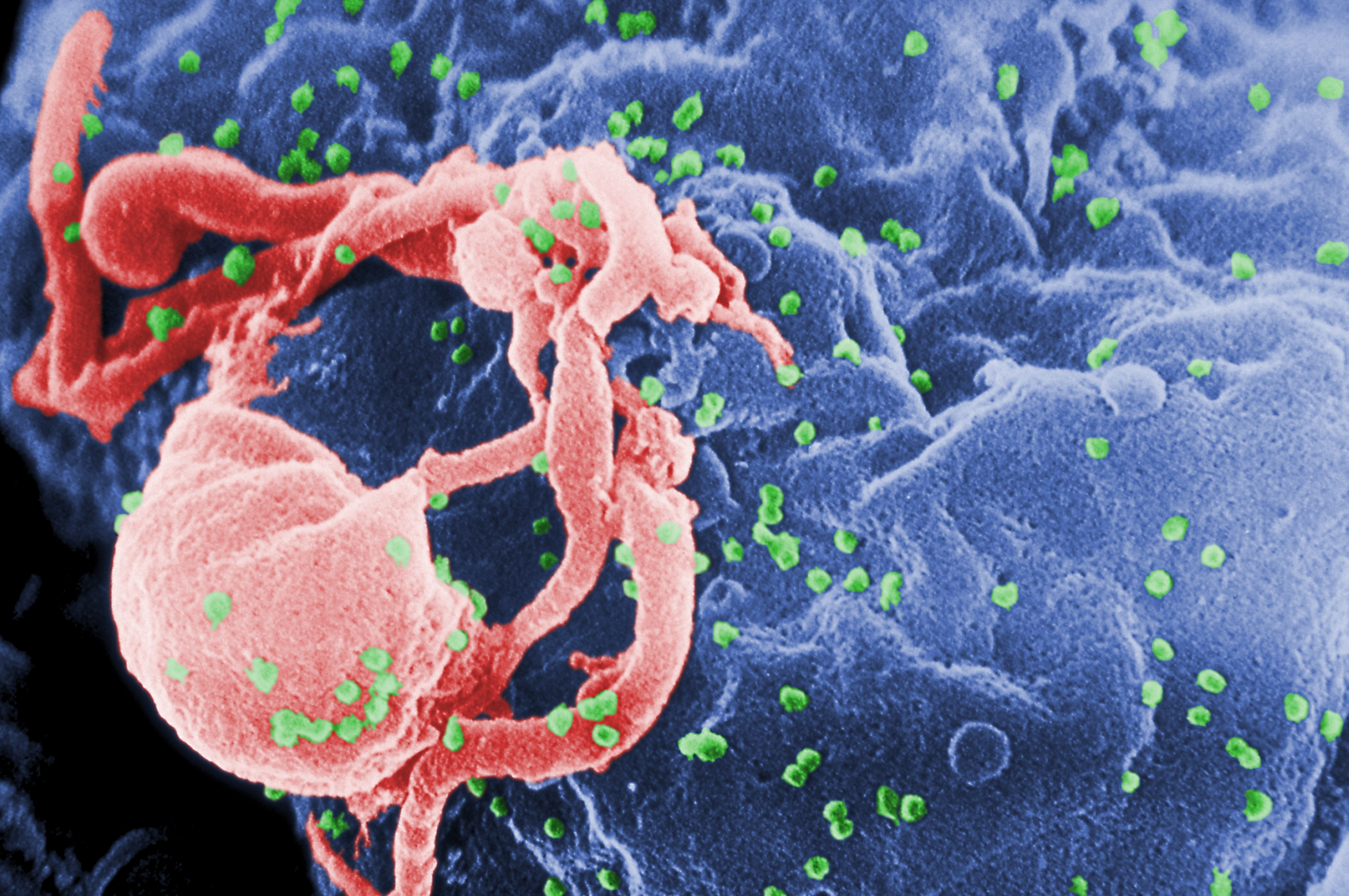
A scanning electron microscope image of human immunodeficiency viria (green) in and around a cultured lymphocyte.

Bugchasing (alternatively bug chasing) is the practice of intentionally seeking human immunodeficiency virus (HIV) infection through sexual activity.

Bugchasers, those who eroticize HIV, are a subculture of barebackers, men who have unprotected sex with other men. There are some explanations for the behavior and fantasies of bugchasing, ranging from sexual excitement at the idea of HIV-positive status, to finding a shared sense of community with other HIV-positive people, to suicidality.

The concept earned widespread attention after the 2003 publication of the article "Bug Chasers: The men who long to be HIV+" in Rolling Stone. This article was widely disputed for its statistical methods which over-stated the prevalence of bugchasing, and for fabricating statements from medical professionals. The practice may have existed since the AIDS crisis began in the late 1970s and early 1980s. The practice has since been mentioned in or the focus of pieces of media and popular culture. As of 2021, bugchasing behavior still persists as a niche behavior, in spite of the widespread availability of effective PrEP and HAART treatments that protect against HIV transmission.

== Origins ==
The early development of bugchasing subculture is obscure; the practice may have existed from the start of the AIDS crisis. As a subculture, bugchasing became notably more visible and cohesive with the adoption of computer networks in the 1990s. Newsweek reported on it in 1997 and Rolling Stone in 2003. The Rolling Stone article, "Bug Chasers: The men who long to be HIV+", written by Gregory Freeman, was the first to bring widespread concern and attention to the practice. That article claimed that around 25 percent of all new HIV infections in the United States (10,000 of 40,000) were linked to bugchasing activity.

Freeman's statistics erroneously classified as bugchasers all men who engaged in barebacking, regardless of motivation or attempts to seek out HIV infection. The physicians that Freeman cited have since claimed he fabricated their statements, and his data have been widely criticized. In the estimation of sexuality studies scholar Octavio R. Gonzalez, Freeman's article was perhaps most responsible for bringing the term bugchasing to a mainstream audience, and public interest in and understanding of the practice increased following Freeman's article.

== Motivation and activity ==
Bugchasers are men who have sex with men (MSM) (Note: While other groups are also disproportionately impacted by HIV, including trans women, García-Iglesias 2022, p. 38, writes: "I have found little to no evidence (even anecdotal) of trans people engaging in bugchasing, and there is also an absence of trans people from online narratives and discourses about bugchasing. This suggests that it is not objective HIV prevalence but rather the cultural background of HIV that determines the makeup of bugchasing.") who eroticize HIV infection, particularly through engaging in online sexual fantasies of being infected with HIV, or who actually pursue infection with the virus. Since little is understood about the practice in general, the motivations for developing bugchasing identity and behavior remain largely undefined. However, at least four motivations have been suggested:

Once the initial shock dissipated, he felt relieved, like he had been given a free pass to have consensual bareback sex without worry of being infected.

— Journalist Bobby Box on a bugchaser's reaction to HIV-positive diagnosis (2020)

1. Some men may become bugchasers as a result of fear of HIV infection, which had previously altered their sexual behavior, such as men abstaining from sex entirely, committing to one partner, or using preventative measures such as condoms. In this way, bugchasers may view their actions as empowering, both sexually and personally; the transformation of bugchasers from HIV-negative to HIV-positive status is understood by the group as masculinizing, which grants them additional status.

2. Some men view HIV-positive status as erotic or sexually stimulating. It may be a subject of pleasure or the ultimate taboo to overcome.

3. Bugchasers may understand HIV-positive status (or its pursuit) as granting a shared identity and sense of community.

4. Bugchasing has been described as a political device and action against social norms (such as those tied to heteronormativity) through transgression of—or rebellion against—popular sentiments about gay life.

There is a fifth possible motivation—suicide—but this remains an unclear or imprecise explanation for bugchasing behavior.

Bugchasing is a rare sexual taboo. Many self-identified bugchasers do not deliberately seek out sex with HIV-positive people. Many men who self-identify as bugchasers never attempt to become HIV-positive.

The widespread availability of pre-exposure prophylaxis (PrEP), capable of preventing HIV infection in otherwise unprotected sexual encounters, has not resulted in the disappearance of bugchasing. Some men incorporate taking PrEP alongside bugchasing behavior, others experiment with bugchasing while on PrEP, and others view it as emasculating and refuse to use it.

== Group dynamics ==
While barebacking and bugchasing are both centered in risky sexual activity, they are distinct activities. Bugchasing is a subculture of barebacking, and intent is a distinguishing characteristic between bugchasers and barebackers: most barebackers do not intend to be infected (or infect others) with HIV, which is the apparent focus of bugchasing behavior.

In the view of ethnologist Jamie García-Iglesias and researcher Tim Dean, bugchasers circulate several metaphors that distinguish their identity from other MSM communities: insemination, pregnancy, and paternity. According to Dean and the psychological researcher Hugh Klein, since HIV is able to spread and reproduce through the sexual activity belonging to bugchasing, its cultural dimensions—institutions, norms, practices, and forms of kinship that, taken together, form a community situated around HIV status—may be transmitted through viral infection, similar to cultural propagation through birth and paternity.

Similarly, bugchasing spaces may reinforce certain notions of masculinity. Sex researcher Ellie Reynolds writes that HIV-positive men who purposely seek out others to infect with HIV—known as giftgivers—are constructed as hypermasculine through a penetrative sexual role, while bugchasers are understood to lack masculinity: penetrated (rather than penetrating), having their rectums described with words relating to women such as "pussy" and "mancunt", they occupy a feminine role in the social order. Whether giftgivers continue to exist is uncertain, given what García-Iglesias calls their "statistically rare" population and "biological implausib[ility] (on the basis of widespread successful treatment)".

== Media and culture ==
American filmmaker Louise Hogarth released a documentary, The Gift, in the same year the Rolling Stone piece was published. It focused on narratives of bugchasers, emphasizing the self-reported positive aspects of HIV infection. Three years later, Ricky Dyer, an HIV-positive man, released a documentary through BBC3 entitled "I love being HIV+", suggesting that most bugchasing activity is simply fantasy. In 2009, gay playwright Erik Patterson ran the tragicomedy He Asked For It, dealing with bugchasing and HIV-positive status in contemporary Hollywood. Bugchasing was also a part of the show Queer as Folk.

In 2012, Canadian Steven Boone was tried and convicted of three counts each of attempted murder and aggravated sexual assault after having unprotected sex with four men after previously contracting HIV. A self-described "poz vampire"—the word poz referring to acquiring HIV—he was immersed in bugchasing culture. His convictions on attempted murder have since been quashed after appealing to the Court of Appeal for Ontario, while the aggravated sexual assault convictions remain. The appeals court said it was not proven in the original case that he intended to kill his sexual partners; it offered the government the possibility of a new trial.

== Notes and references ==
=== Bibliography ===
- Ames, Lynda J.; Atchinson, Alana B.; Rose, Tom (17 December 1995). "Love, Lust, and Fear: Safer Sex Decision Making Among Gay Men". Journal of Homosexuality. 30 (1): 53–73. doi:10.1300/J082v30n01_03. PMID 8907598.
- Anderson, Patrick (18 August 2018). "To Be Undone". Performance Research. 23 (6): 25–34. doi:10.1080/13528165.2018.1533755. S2CID 192836674.
- Ashford, Chris (August 2010). "Barebacking and the 'Cult of Violence': Queering the Criminal Law" (PDF). The Journal of Criminal Law. 74 (4): 339–357. doi:10.1350/jcla.2010.74.4.647. S2CID 144980351.
- Box, Bobby (23 January 2020). "Why These Gay Men Want HIV—Not PrEP". LOGO News.
- Bollas, Angelos (27 March 2021). "Masculinities on the Side: An Exploration of the Function of Homosexism in Maintaining Hegemonic Masculinities and Sexualities". Sexuality & Culture. 25 (5): 1761–1770. doi:10.1007/s12119-021-09848-3. S2CID 233688402.
- Breitfeller, Gabriella H.; Kanekar, Amar (2012). "Intentional HIV Transmission Among Men Who Have Sex With Men: A Scoping Review". Gay & Lesbian Issues and Psychology Review. 8 (4): 112–121.
- Buys, Anthea (1 November 2010). "Athi-Patra Ruga and the Politics of Context". Critical Arts. 24 (3): 480–485. doi:10.1080/02560046.2010.511891. S2CID 143555740.
- Carballo-Diéguez, Alex; Bauermeister, José (19 May 2004). "'Barebacking': Intentional Condomless Anal Sex in HIV-Risk Contexts. Reasons for and Against It". Journal of Homosexuality. 47 (1): 1–16. doi:10.1300/J082v47n01_01. PMID 15189783. S2CID 216116560.
- Crook, John (14 May 2004). "Growing Pains". Calgary Herald.
- Crossley, Michele L. (June 2004). "Making Sense of 'Barebacking': Gay Men's Narratives, Unsafe Sex and the 'Resistance Habitus'". British Journal of Social Psychology. 43 (2): 225–244. doi:10.1348/0144666041501679. PMID 15285832.
- Dean, Tim (2008). "Breeding Culture: Barebacking, Bugchasing, Giftgiving". The Massachusetts Review. 49 (1/2): 80–94. ISSN 0025-4878. JSTOR 25091283.
- Dean, Tim (2009). Unlimited Intimacy: Reflections on the Subculture of Barebacking. Chicago: University of Chicago Press. ISBN 978-0-226-13939-5.
- García-Iglesias, Jaime (18 October 2018). "Do Some People Really Want to get HIV? I Spoke to 'Bug Chasers' around the World to Find Out". The Conversation.
- García-Iglesias, Jaime (2 October 2020b). "Wanting HIV Is 'Such a Hot Choice': Exploring Bugchasers' Fluid Identities and Online Engagements". Deviant Behavior. 41 (10): 1232–1243. doi:10.1080/01639625.2019.1606617. hdl:20.500.11820/3bbe24b0-f076-48bb-a276-1f400a4c4e94. S2CID 151117568.
- García-Iglesias, Jaime (17 November 2020a). "Viral Breedings: HIV as Pregnancy Among Bugchasers" (PDF). Norma. 15 (3–4): 221–234. doi:10.1080/18902138.2020.1744408. hdl:20.500.11820/d0a60054-89d2-4acb-82a3-af3b29f6edfc. S2CID 216431370.
- García-Iglesias, Jaime (24 March 2021a). "From Training Wheels to Chemical Condoms: Exploring Narratives of PrEP Discontinuation". Health: An Interdisciplinary Journal for the Social Study of Health, Illness and Medicine. 27 (1): 114–128. doi:10.1177/13634593211005177. hdl:2299/24158. PMC 9742631. PMID 33757365. S2CID 232338686.
- García-Iglesias, Jaime (1 February 2021b). "Writing Bugchasing Ethnoperformance: Creative Representations of Online Interactions". Sexualities. 24 (1–2): 154–175. doi:10.1177/1363460719896967. S2CID 210553863.
- García-Iglesias, Jaime (2022). The Eroticizing of HIV: Viral Fantasies. Health, Technology and Society. Palgrave Macmillan. ISBN 9783031113529.
- Gauthier, Deann K.; Forsyth, Craig J. (January 1999). "bareback sex, bug chasers, and the gift of death". Deviant Behavior. 20 (1): 85–100. doi:10.1080/016396299266605.
- Gonzalez, Octavio R. (2010). "Tracking the Bugchaser: Giving "The Gift" of HIV/AIDS". Cultural Critique. 75 (75): 82–113. doi:10.1353/cul.2010.0010. ISSN 0882-4371. JSTOR 40800643. S2CID 53388432.
- Graydon, Michael (May 2007). "Don't Bother to Wrap It: Online Giftgiver and Bugchaser Newsgroups, the Social Impact of Gift Exchanges and the 'Carnivalesque'". Culture, Health & Sexuality. 9 (3): 277–292. doi:10.1080/13691050601124649. PMID 17457731. S2CID 20164022.
- Greteman, Adam J. (August 2013). "Fashioning a Bareback Pedagogy: Towards a Theory of Risky (Sex) Education". Sex Education. 13 (supplementary 1): S20–S31. doi:10.1080/14681811.2012.760154. S2CID 143601481.
- Grov, Christian (November 2006). "Barebacking Websites: Electronic Environments for Reducing or Inducing HIV Risk". AIDS Care. 18 (8): 990–997. doi:10.1080/09540120500521137. PMID 17012090. S2CID 24493921.
- Hammond, Chad; Holmes, Dave; Mercier, Mathieu (September 2016). "Breeding New Forms of Life: A Critical Reflection on Extreme Variances of Bareback Sex". Nursing Inquiry. 23 (3): 267–277. doi:10.1111/nin.12139. PMID 27264510.
- Huebenthal, Jan (24 January 2017). "Un/Detectability in Times of "Equality": HIV, Queer Health, and Homonormativity". European Journal of American Studies. 11 (3). doi:10.4000/ejas.11729.
- Holt, Thomas J. (December 2010). "Exploring Strategies for Qualitative Criminological and Criminal Justice Inquiry Using On-Line Data". Journal of Criminal Justice Education. 21 (4): 466–487. doi:10.1080/10511253.2010.516565. S2CID 143390082.
- Howard, Ken; Yamey, Gavin (22 February 2003). "Magazine's HIV Claim Rekindles "Gay Plague" Row". BMJ. 326: 454. doi:10.1136/bmj.326.7386.454. PMC 1125344. S2CID 70917253.
- Inhorn, Marcia C. (17 November 2020). "Reproducing Men in the Twenty-first Century: Emergent Masculinities, Subjectivities, Biosocialities, and Technologies". Norma. 15 (3–4): 299–305. doi:10.1080/18902138.2020.1831157. ISSN 1890-2138. S2CID 225119140.
- Jaspal, Rusi; Bayley, Jake (2020). HIV and Gay Men: Clinical, Social and Psychological Aspects. Singapore: Palgrave Macmillan. ISBN 978-981-15-7225-8.
- Klein, Hugh (22 October 2014). "Generationing, Stealthing, and Gift Giving: The Intentional Transmission of HIV by HIV-positive Men to their HIV-negative Sex Partners". Health Psychology Research. 2 (3): 1582. doi:10.4081/hpr.2014.1582 (inactive 1 October 2025). PMC 4768590. PMID 26973945.
- "Truthful Take on a Tough Topic". Los Angeles Times. 2 May 2008.
- MacKinnon, Emily; Crompton, Constance (2012). "The Gender of Lying: Feminist Perspectives on the Non-Disclosure of HIV Status". UBC Law Review. 45 (2).
- Malkowski, Jennifer (June 2014). "Beyond Prevention: Containment Rhetoric in the Case of Bug Chasing". Journal of Medical Humanities. 35 (2): 211–228. doi:10.1007/s10912-014-9280-x. PMID 24682645. S2CID 25612944.
- Medeiros, Priscilla (2016). "The Harmful Consequences of Living with HIV in Contemporary Society". Nexus: The Canadian Student Journal of Anthropology. 24: 59–73. doi:10.15173/nexus.v24i1.890.
- Moskowitz, David A.; Roloff, Michael E. (July 2007a). "The Existence of a Bug Chasing Subculture". Culture, Health & Sexuality. 9 (4): 347–357. doi:10.1080/13691050600976296. PMID 17612955. S2CID 31893571.
- Moskowitz, David A.; Roloff, Michael E. (2 April 2007b). "The Ultimate High: Sexual Addiction and the Bug Chasing Phenomenon". Sexual Addiction & Compulsivity. 14 (1): 21–40. doi:10.1080/10720160601150121. S2CID 11481290.
- Palm, Fredrik (2019). "Viral Desires: Enjoyment and Death in the Contemporary Discourse on Barebacking". In Holmberg, Tora; Jonsson, Annika; Palm, Fredrik (eds.). Death Matters. Palgrave Macmillan. pp. 129–150. doi:10.1007/978-3-030-11485-5_7. ISBN 978-3-030-11484-8. S2CID 155983517.
- Parashar, Amita (29 June 2009). "He Asked for It". The Advocate.
- Reynolds, Ellie (25 February 2007a). "Becoming HIV: Disease as Agency". Material World. Archived from the original on 6 October 2021.
- Reynolds, Ellie (December 2007b). "'Pass the Cream, Hold the Butter': Meanings of HIV Positive Semen for Bugchasers and Giftgivers". Anthropology & Medicine. 14 (3): 259–266. doi:10.1080/13648470701694693. PMID 27268741. S2CID 8926663.
- Romero-Palau, Mario; Cuenca-Martínez, Ferran (2021). "Conductas Sexuales de Riesgo y Búsqueda Consciente de Infección por Vih/Sida (Bug-Chasing): Una Revisión Narrativa Desde la Psicología". Apuntes de Psicología. 39 (1): 45–51. doi:10.55414/ap.v39i1.836. hdl:11441/129089. ISSN 0213-3334. S2CID 259561798.
- Santiesteban Díaz, Yasel Manuel; Orlando-Narváez, Solon Alberto; Ballester-Arnal, Rafael (April 2019). "Conductas de Riesgo Hacia la Infección por VIH. Una Revisión de Tendencias Emergentes". Ciência & Saúde Coletiva. 24 (4): 1417–1426. doi:10.1590/1413-81232018244.02322017. hdl:10234/182884. PMID 31066843.
- Shoffman, Marc (10 April 2006). "No Evidence of Gay "Bug Chasers," AIDs Group Say". PinkNews.
- Sothern, Matthew (2006). "On Not Living With AIDS: Or, AIDS-As-Post-Crisis". ACME: An International Journal for Critical Geographies. 5 (2): 144–162. ISSN 1492-9732.
- Swan, Holly; Monico, Laura (2014). "Connections: HIV and Bugchasers across Queer Collectives". In Tammy L, Tammy L. (ed.). Understanding Deviance: Connecting Classical and Contemporary Perspectives (Illustrated ed.). Routledge.
- Tewksbury, Richard (September 2003). "Bareback Sex and the Quest for HIV: Assessing the Relationship in Internet Personal Advertisements of Men who have Sex with Men". Deviant Behavior. 24 (5): 467–482. doi:10.1080/713840245. ISSN 0163-9625. S2CID 146756101.
- Tomso, Gregory (2004). "Bug Chasing, Barebacking, and the Risks of Care". Literature and Medicine. 23 (1): 88–111. doi:10.1353/lm.2004.0014. PMID 15264511. S2CID 9065179.
- Tomso, Gregory (1 April 2008). "Viral Sex and the Politics of Life". South Atlantic Quarterly. 107 (2): 265–285. doi:10.1215/00382876-2007-066.
- Weiss, Amanda (2006). "Criminalizing Consensual Transmission of HIV". University of Chicago Legal Forum. 2006: 389–408.
- Yogaretnam, Shaamini (13 August 2019). "Court Quashes Convictions of Man who Tried to Spread HIV". Ottawa Citizen.
