= Bobby Blake =

Pornography actor

- Born: Edgar Gaines; August 11, 1957 (age 69); Memphis, Tennessee
- Years active: 1991–2000

Bobby Blake (born Edgar Gaines; August 11, 1957) is a Baptist elder who acted in gay pornography until his retirement in 2000.

== Biography ==
Blake appeared in over 100 releases.

Bobby Blake was a long time partner with Flex-Deon Blake. Bobby actually referred Flex-Deon to the producer Edward James, and secured the introduction of Flex-Deon to the adult industry. Bobby Blake has told the story of their relationship in his book, My Life in Porn.

As a subject of Gay Studies

The film Niggas' Revenge, and Flex-Deon Blake's role in it, have become the subject of academic discussion. In his book, Unlimited Intimacy: Reflections on the Subculture of Barebacking, Tim Dean, a professor at the University at Buffalo, treats Niggas' Revenge in detail because of the way in which it fetishizes the simultaneous transgression of a number of taboos, all in order, Dean argues, to “conjure the transgressive charge of unprotected anal sex among gay men". The representation of interracial sex, rape, violence, and incest (between Chris Blake and Bobby Blake) is enhanced by what Dean calls Flex-Deon Blake's "phallicized" appearance.

== Autobiography: My Life in Porn ==
Bobby Blake has written the book My Life in Porn: The Bobby Blake Story co-written by Blake and John R. Gordon and published by the Running Press of Philadelphia in 2008. In his autobiography, he talks extensively about his youth and experiences in the adult film industry. In one of the closing chapters entitled "Prodigal Returns", he depicts himself as the "prodigal son" who "had to leave [his] church and the place of [his] birth and go out there in the far country". He continues: "In all the years I was working in the adult entertainment business, I never turned my back on God or the Bible teachings I had grown up with." Blake emphasizes that he has no regrets about his lifestyle, interpreting it as part of God's plan for him: "Now that it's over, I can accept that that journey was all part of God's plan for me."

== Personal life ==
Blake was the long-term partner of Flex-Deon Blake, another black gay pornographic actor. It was Bobby Blake who, by referring Flex-Deon to the producer Edward James, introduced his partner to the adult industry. Bobby Blake has told the story of their relationship in his book, My Life in Porn.

Blake self-identifies as bisexual and has dated multiple women in the past, but has an attraction more fixated towards men as most of his serious relationships have been shared with men.

== Ministry ==
Since 2000, he has been an elder of Tabernacle Baptist Church in Atlanta.

== Bibliography ==
- Bobby Blake and John R. Gordon, My Life in Porn, Running Press Book Publishers, June 9, 2008, 280p. (ISBN 978-0-786-72096-5)

== Partial filmography ==
Bobby Blake has appeared in 102 films. Among his best known are:

- Black Nubian Fantasies (1997)
- Goldie Locks and the 3 Bi Bears (1997)
- Bi Bi Black (1998)
- Black Bi Demand (1998)
- Get Hooked on This (1999)
- Black Ballers (1999)
- Black Ballers 2: Foul Play (1999)
- Black Power (1999)
- Black Workout 10 (2000)
- Bobby's Big Stick (2000)
- Hung Beach (2000)
- The Underboss (2000)
- Niggas' Revenge (2001)
- Black Sex Party #3 (2001)
- Black Sex Party #4 (2001)
- Black Bisexuality (2007)

== See also ==
- List of male performers in gay porn films
