= Spunk Video =

Pornographic Content Company

- Type: Private
- Industry: Gay pornography
- Founded: 2003
- Founder: Gary Carlton; Mike Brady
- Headquarters: San Francisco, California, United States,
- Products: Pornographic films
- Website: www.spunkvideo.com

Spunk Video is a San Francisco-based gay adult pornography company, specializing in gay pornographic fetish content. The company runs an online store, and produces original films primarily dealing with condomless sex (bareback), and all-oral, watersports, and fisting material. The company also owns and distributes films from the Christopher Rage library produced in the 1980s and 1990s.

== Products ==
Spunk has issued close to 100 pornographic films under several brand names.

- Spunk Video is the company's flagship brand
- SpunkBoy.com focuses on younger models
- EuroSpunk features Czech models usually engaged in watersports or gang bang scenes
- Christopher Rage from the collection of the classic director

== Corporate history ==
Spunk Video started as an online DVD store in 2003, roughly 18 months later the company ventured into the production of original videos, under the names Spunk Studios, Spunk Video, SpunkBoy, and Christopher Rage. The company was started by gay adult video director Gary Carlton and his domestic partner and producer Mike Brady. Prior to founding Spunk Video, Carlton and Brady invested in and were principals of Raging Stallion, and ran that company's business affairs for approximately 9 months. Creative and business differences about the direction of that company caused a split, and the pair departed Raging Stallion in early 2003 and formed Spunk Video just two months later.

== Relationship to Treasure Island/New Barbary Coast Distribution ==
From the beginning of the company, Spunk Video has had a close working relationship to the Paul Morris-owned companies Treasure Island Media, and New Barbary Coast Distribution (NBCD). Spunk Video is a major reseller of Treasure Island DVDs, as well other titles distributed by NBCD, and NBCD was the exclusive distributor for the SpunkBoy line of videos featuring younger gay men.

The companies have held merger talks at various points of their relationship, but have decided to remain independent of one another, but still having a close working relationship distributing each other's products.

== Other studio distribution ==
In addition to its own lines of product, from 2004 to 2007 Spunk Video was the exclusive North American distributor of several lines of movies. These video lines included:

- Primepork
- Red Eagle Films
- Oink! Video
- XXX-Project
- EB Video

After this time the company discontinued wholesale distribution to concentrate on original content production.

== Barebacking controversy ==
As an online store, SpunkVideo.com was one of the first to sell bareback films. The company has routinely been criticised by people inside and outside the adult video world for selling these types of movies.

== See also ==
- List of male performers in gay porn films
- List of gay pornographic movie studios
- Pornography
