= Up Your Alley =

Up Your Alley may refer to:

- Up Your Alley (album), by Joan Jett and the Blackhearts
- Up Your Alley (film), starring Linda Blair
- "Up Your Alley", an episode of Home Improvement
- Up Your Alley Fair, a leather and fetish event held in San Francisco, California
