= Niggas' Revenge =

2001 gay pornographic film by Dick Wadd

- DVD released by Dick Wadd Fetish
- Directed by: Dick Wadd
- Produced by: Dick Wadd
- Starring: Chane Adams; Bobby Blake; Chris Blake; Flex-Deon Blake; Dallas Chalmers; Bud Cockerham; Eric Top Stud
- Production company: Dick Wadd Fetish
- Distributed by: Dick Wadd Fetish
- Release date: 2001 (United States)
- Running time: 113 minutes
- Country: United States
- Language: English

Niggas' Revenge is a 2001 gay pornographic horror film produced and directed by Dick Wadd and starring Bobby Blake and Flex-Deon Blake in their last film together. In his autobiography My Life in Porn, Bobby Blake devoted a whole chapter to the film, explaining some of his motives and describing it as "an expensive movie and the most powerful movie of my life", adding, "It's also one of the most controversial adult films ever made, and that's what I wanted it to be - I had decided this was to be my last film, and I wanted to take it to the limit."

== Synopsis ==
Three neo-Nazi supremacists go to the residence of the Blakes and shout racial slurs, harassing and bullying them in an attempt to get them to leave the neighborhood. However, the muscular black neighbors have finally had enough and get their revenge on the white harassers. They capture them and put them in a cage. Then they proceed to beat them up, urinate on them and sexually degrade and torture them until they completely break down and submit to the power of their black masters. The Blakes also invite Eric Top Stud, a light-skinned Puerto Rican stud to take part in abusing the neo-Nazis. There are also scenes of incest between Chris and Bobby Blake with Chris being the sole submissive black in the film.

== Cast ==
Tops

- Bobby Blake
- Flex-Deon Blake
- Eric Top Stud (latino)

Versatile

- Chris Blake (top and bottom)

Neo-nazi (white) bottoms

- Chane Adams
- Dallas Chalmers
- Bud Cockerham (credited as Bud)

Brief role

- Crystal Blake (relative of the Blake "brothers")

== Background ==
Bobby Blake had decided to retire from his long-term career as a gay pornstar. However, he had asked Dick Wadd before he quit to act in one last film with his ex-partner Flex-Deon Blake with no strings attached, where Bobby would be given the upper hand in doing whatever he pleased or fantasized. Most of the plot was reportedly left unscripted and entirely to the discretion of Bobby Blake who wanted to keep the element of surprise and apprehension on the rest of the characters in the film including the three submissive characters and the director. Whilst filming the movie, two of the white actors were reportedly concussed on set as a result of vigorous pounding and filming had to be stopped as the two men were brought round with proper hydration.

Bobby Blake explains in his autobiography My Life in Porn: The Bobby Blake Story in the chapter consecrated to Niggas' Revenge:

When you watch Flex and Chris Blake in that film, you can tell the difference between the way I handled the other [submissive] guys, and the way they did. Flex and Chris just didn't have it in them to really dominate a situation in the way I did. In fact they were weak. Especially Chris. He was hired to be a top beside me and Flex, but it was no surprise that he ended up in the pillory with me fucking his ass as well as the white guys' asses.

But Bobby Blake praised the three submissive white actors of the film for accepting to go on with no strings attached. In My Life in Porn he admits:

I have to commend the guys who played the neo-Nazis – Bud, Dallas Chalmers, and Chane Adams – because they took a genuine beating. It wasn't a fake movie; from the whipping with the belt, to the breaking of two-by-four over their asses, the slapping, the spitting, the making them drink piss, all of that was totally real. All the time I wanted to do just one film that was totally extreme. I did it and that was it. I was liberated from something. I had done what I needed. I retired from porn and went on with my life.

Bobby Blake also apologized for the unprotected sex of the film.

This was the only movie in my entire career where I fucked without condoms. All the time I was making movies, and since my retirement from the adult entertainment industry, I've done a lot of work supporting HIV/AIDS awareness issues, so what did I think I was doing in that particular instance. The only honest answer I can give is: we all make mistakes. And that was a mistake I made. I was caught up in the extreme mentality and an extreme situation, and I didn't exercise proper control over myself. But what I would say to anybody, and in particular young people today, is don't let somebody else's mistake be your mistake. Don't use what I did as an excuse to do something you know isn't wise. Practice safer sex.

== Reception ==
=== Critical response ===
Robert Franklin of GayVN gave the film a three out of a possible five, and wrote that it "really pushes the envelope" and "is definitely not for the faint-hearted".

=== Academic analysis ===
The film Niggas' Revenge has become the subject of serious academic discussion about race relations through sex and reversal of roles of oppressor and oppressed. In his book, Unlimited Intimacy: Reflections on the Subculture of Barebacking, Tim Dean, a professor at the University at Buffalo, treats Niggas' Revenge in detail that all in order, Dean argues, to "conjure the transgressive charge of unprotected anal sex among gay men", the film "fetishizes the simultaneous transgression of a number of taboos".

Dean analyzes the portrayal of racism in the movie:

Dick Wadd draws an analogy between U.S. racism and German anti-Semitism, at the same time that he draws on an established porn convention of representing interracial sex meted out by blacks to whites. Transposing anti-Semitism into racism against African-Americans makes sense for video pornography in that black/white difference lends itself to starker more dramatic visualization than do other racial or ethnic differences.

On the troubling unprotected sex in the midst of the HIV epidemic, Dean says:

In bareback porn, the black-on-white contrast also may be a way of making visible less perceptible differences such as that between HIV-positive men and their HIV-negative counterparts. A black men fucking a white man without protection adds salience to the idea of revenge.

On fetishizing the black body represented in many interracial sex scenes, Dean explains:

Not only the activities, context and paraphernalia are recognizably fetishistic [in the film], the participants' bodies are loaded with fetish insignia. Regarding the shaved heads and musculature of the African-American performers, we might say that their whole bodies have been phallisized … They also are heavily pierced and tattooed, especially Flex-Deon Blake, who, in addition to pierced ears, eyebrow, nipples, and navel, sports a formidable Prince Albert through the head of his penis. The thick silver hoops that adorn his body are complemented by the chain-link harness that he dons for the sex scenes, along with black leather boots which all the dominant men wear throughout the proceedings.

The cultural prohibition on incestuous sex is also broken in the film, argues Dean.

Unprotected anal sex is by no means the only taboo that this movie contravenes. The Dick Wadd web informs viewers that Flex-Deon Blake and Bobby Blake are "real life partners" which contributes to the illusion that we're observing a spontaneous unscripted expression of these men's authentic desires … The three African American men are represented as brothers, not just "bruthas." This is particularly significant with respect to the single instance of "versatility", when an African-American takes the bottom role and Bobby Blake fucks Chris Blake next to the stocks. Here the fantasy would be that of witnessing not interracial but incestuous gay sex.

== Sequel ==
In 2009, Dick Wadd filmed and released a sequel entitled Niggas' Revenge 2. None of the actors in the first film returned, instead a new cast of dominant blacks and neo-Nazi submissives were featured. Four black men (Butch Blackmore, Jay Dupree, Jae C, and Ro) on a desert ranch finally have their fill of taunts by their neo-Nazi neighbors (Rich Wrangler, Boy Fillmore, Jake Wetmore and Chris Kohl). So the blacks sneak up and capture the neo-Nazis one by one and lock the white men in the chicken pen. Once locked up, the blacks proceed to beat, urinate on and verbally abuse their white captives as payback for their early taunts. The neo-Nazis struggle and shout racial slurs against their black captors but they are ultimately powerless as they are spat on and grinded under the boots of the dominant blacks. Then they take the white men out one by one and sexually degrade them. They torture and anally rape the neo-Nazis until they break down and submit to the power of their black masters. Mister H also makes an appearance telling the white men to shut up as they are being sodomized.

Cast

- Black tops
  - Butch Blackmore
  - Jay Dupree
  - Jae C
  - Ro
  - Mister H
- Neo-nazi white bottoms
  - Boy Fillmore
  - Jake Wetmore
  - Rich Wrangler
  - Chris Kohl
