= Paul Morris (producer) =

American pornographic film director

- Born: Charles Stevan Key
- Education: Mills College (MFA)
- Occupations: Pornographic film producer, director
- Known for: Founder of Treasure Island Media

Charles Stevan Key, better known as Paul Morris, is the owner of Treasure Island Media, a San Francisco, California-based gay pornography studio that specializes in bareback pornography.

== Career ==
Before being a pornographer, Morris studied composition. He holds an MFA in Electronic Music from Mills College. He has studied with Robert Ashley, Philip Corner, Grosvenor Cooper, Terry Riley, and Lou Harrison.

Morris started Treasure Island Media, naming the business after his favorite childhood book (Treasure Island). In 1998, he filmed Raunch Lunch. Alongside his own videos, Morris has expanded the studio to release videos directed by Damon Dogg, Max Sohl, Liam Cole, and the Mecos group in Mexico City, and independently produced videos by Swiss members of the Dark Sun Collective.

He is known to be a patron of independent filmmakers and has supported work by Rankin Renwick, Bill Daniel, Todd Verow, Daniel Rabinowitz, Lee Krist, Ryan Sullivan and others. He has also funded projects by San Francisco's Artists' Television Access. He was a primary producer of Todd Ahlberg's film, Meth, a feature-length documentary on drug abuse among gay men.

In October 2007, Morris's Treasure Island Media (TIM) won the prize for Best US Studio at the DAVID Awards in Berlin. This caused controversy as TIM produces bareback films, filmed without a condom, causing Titan Media founder Bruce Cam to decline a Lifetime Achievement Award at the same event. In 2008, Morris received a Best Director Golden Dickie Award for "What I Can't See 2" (which also won Best Video) from Rad Video and Treasure Island Media received the most awards of any adult company including Best Studio.

Morris and his company have been repeatedly banned from consideration for most adult industry awards and events. In July 2009, it was announced that Treasure Island Media had been banned from participating in both The Folsom Street Fair and Dore Alley in San Francisco, and also International Mr. Leather in Chicago. When asked for his opinion on winning awards, Morris states, "I don't pay attention to those things. Prizes are for kids. I'm a grown-up now."

In his article "Unbecoming: Pornography and the Queer Event", Tufts University professor Lee Edelman discussed the role of Morris's pornography as work that "hopelessly heralds the future" of what Edelman calls the "posthumanous". In this function, Edelman wrote, Morris' pornography is similar to the film works of both Pier Paolo Pasolini and Michael Haneke.

In May 2014, Morris gave his first phone interview in almost ten years to Australian journalist, Toby McCasker, on the topic of HIV as seen in the Treasure Island picture, Viral Loads.

Morris has co-published academic articles with porn studies scholar Susanna Paasonen in GLQ: A Journal of Lesbian and Gay Studies and The Oxford Handbook of Sound and Image in Digital Media.
