= The Gift (2003 film) =

- Directed by: Louise Hogarth
- Written by: Louise Hogarth
- Release date: 2003
- Running time: 62 minutes
- Country: United States
- Language: English

The Gift is a 2003 documentary film by filmmaker Louise Hogarth documenting the phenomenon of deliberate HIV infection; such practices are known colloquially as bugchasing, for seeking and providing voluntary HIV infection, respectively. The film follows the stories of two "bug chasers" who are seeking "the gift" of HIV infection. Interviews are also conducted with AIDS activist and author, Walt Odets, PhD, and HIV positive and negative men. The film explores the normalization and glamorization of HIV/AIDS and discusses the isolation and division caused by HIV status in the gay community.

== Synopsis ==
Doug Hitzel, a young man, reveals that after a year of unsuccessful dating he decided to engage in unprotected sex in an attempt to fit in; he is then seen crying.

Kenboy, another young man, explains he moved to an LA sex house with sex parties and was relieved to finally catch HIV; the sex parties were known as "Standard Fuck Parties". Condoms were traditionally barred from use, though at the time of filming the rule had been changed to mere discouragement of condom usage. Anywhere from 100 to 120 men would typically attend these sex parties. The sex party attendants were equipped with numerous sexual paraphernalia for participating in a variety of sexual acts. There were "fuck pews" for bottoms to kneel on while their "top" sexual partners penetrated them, and there was an area reserved for the fisting men, who tended to aggregate together. In the event of good weather, some of the men who go outside to engage in various sexual acts in the well-maintained courtyard. This in particular was considered to be quite romantic by the sex house residents. From then on, Kenboy would not have to worry about getting AIDS or not, or using a condom (failing to think of the possibility of catching other STIs).

A group of older men, who did not get HIV on their own volition, explain how they lost many of their friends and lovers to HIV, and how they do not want a relationship because they do not want their boyfriend having to bury them too. They also talk about the medication which they must take, and about its side-effects - particularly cardiac attacks, which seem to have replaced direct death from the virus itself. Advertising for prevention is also exposed for being too positive and showing images of attractive men with AIDS.

== Reception ==
The Age wrote that "The reaction of the gay press in Australia and the United States to The Gift and the Rolling Stone article [about bug-chasing] has largely been to report the controversy, but not to investigate the phenomenon."
