= Sticky Fingers (book) =

2017 book by Joe Hagan

Sticky Fingers: The Life and Times of Jann Wenner and Rolling Stone Magazine
- Author: Joe Hagan
- Language: English
- Subject: Jann Wenner; Rolling Stone magazine
- Publisher: Alfred A. Knopf
- Publication date: October 24, 2017
- Pages: 560
- ISBN: 978-1-101-87437-0

Sticky Fingers: The Life and Times of Jann Wenner and Rolling Stone Magazine is a 2017 book by Joe Hagan that examines Jann Wenner and the history of Rolling Stone magazine.
