= Bug Chasers: The men who long to be HIV+ =

2003 magazine article by Gregory Freeman

- Author: Gregory Freeman
- Subject: An alleged community of gay men who desire to contract HIV/AIDS
- Publisher: Rolling Stone
- Publication date: February 6, 2003
- Publication place: United States
- Media type: Magazine article

"Bug Chasers: The men who long to be HIV+" is a Rolling Stone magazine article written by Gregory Freeman and originally published on February 6, 2003, that describes a purportedly large group of gay men who desire to be infected with human immunodeficiency viruses (HIV). The article profiled an HIV-negative gay man—"Carlos"—who discussed his sexual fantasy of bugchasing, a practice of intentionally seeking HIV through unprotected sex with other men. Freeman interviewed two doctors for the article, who alleged that 25 percent of new HIV infections among gay men are from men who actively sought to contract the virus.

After the publication of the article, the health authorities featured in the article denied making the statements which the article attributed to them. Various commentators criticized the article as untrue and disparaging of gay men. The Drudge Report was one media source which promoted the article's claims as true.

== Story ==
On February 6, 2003, Rolling Stone published the article by Gregory Freeman titled "Bug Chasers: The men who long to be HIV+" about an alleged community of gay men who desire to contract HIV/AIDS. The article profiled Carlos, a HIV-negative gay man from New York. The majority of the article is a profile of the life of "Carlos", who is described as a gay male living in New York City. Carlos is HIV-negative, but spends his time seeking HIV infection through bareback sex from HIV-positive men. Carlos reports that the HIV-positive men he meets have sexual arousal when given the opportunity to spread HIV to people who wish to become infected. Carlos is unconcerned with the health consequences of HIV/AIDS, and compares it to diabetes by saying that both are easily managed by taking pills.

The article includes interviews with two doctors: Bob Cabaj and Marshall Forstein. Cabaj, a director for a government health service agency in San Francisco, is said to claim that among gay males, 25 percent of new HIV infections are men who actively sought to contract HIV. Forstein of Fenway Health in Boston is said to claim that their clinic regularly has gay male patients who report seeking HIV infections, and that their clinic has noted the growing popularity of this behavior.

Rolling Stone magazine had recently appointed a new editor, Ed Needham. Needham oversaw the production of this story.

== Reactions ==
Newsweek's journalist Seth Mnookin reviewed the Rolling Stone in an article titled, "Is Rolling Stone's Hiv [sic] Story Wildly Exaggerated?". When Mnookin contacted the physicians quoted in the article they denied giving the statements attributed to them. Cabaj, a physician quoted in the article, said that when Rolling Stone's fact-checker contacted him before publication to verify the statements, he denied them. Cabaj was upset to see the statements published anyway. The other physician, Forstein, denied making the statements attributed to him and said that they were factually incorrect. The article reported a response from GLAAD, who said that the story defames all gay men with misleading reporting. The Advocate agreed with the Newsweek article in its own response and critique. Later in the year, NLGJA: The Association of LGBTQ Journalists recognized Mnookin with an "Excellence in New Media" award for this article.

Freeman as author and Rolling Stone editor Ed Needham acknowledged the doctors' denials of the statements, but claimed that they reported what the doctors told them. Needham said that he remembered the doctors telling him these things, and Needham said that the fact checker for the magazine confirmed the statements as well.

Further critiques of the article challenged the article's numbers, the validity of the interviews, the credentials of the Rolling Stone author, and Rolling Stone itself. Andrew Sullivan writing for Salon.com said that he checked the gay sex websites which Rolling Stone mentioned, but could not find discussion of bug chasing. Sullivan noted that the Rolling Stone article lacked research data and that its proposed methodology to interpret user comments on gay sex websites would be more likely be descriptions of sexual fantasy than actual behavior.

The website Morons.org contacted the physicians as well, also getting their denial.

Tim Cavanaugh writing for Reason.com did a review of prior journalism on bugchasing in response to the Rolling Stone article. He said that bugchasing is comparable to body integrity dysphoria, but whereas Rolling Stone portrays bugchasing as lurid, instead the reality is pitiful.

A writer for The BMJ repeated claims that the Rolling Stone article was sensational.

In response to the article, the director of the AIDS Project Los Angeles said their organization had not observed bugchasing, and that the story seemed like an Internet Phenomenon or an urban legend.

The Drudge Report was a conservative news source which cited Rolling Stone and repeated the claim that large numbers of gay men sought out HIV infection. Other right-wing commentators took the Drudge Report's claims as further validation that the claim was worth sharing, even as other fact checking processes challenged the original Rolling Stone article. Various commentators remarked on the Drudge Report's sharing of the story.

Gay commentator Dan Savage rejected the story as failing fact-checking. Rolling Stone reported that there were 40,000 HIV infections in the United States every year with 10,000 of those due to bug chasing. Savage compared that with Centers for Disease Control and Prevention reports which confirmed that count of annual infections, but said that gay men only accounted for about 40 percent of those, so a portion of gay men could not cause as many infections as claimed. Savage recognized that gay male HIV infection rates are high, but said that the reason is simple promiscuity. Savage dismissed bug chasing as an insignificant and rare fringe behavior of mentally disturbed men.

The Traditional Values Coalition published an article titled "25% of Homosexual Males Seek to be Infected with HIV", referencing the Rolling Stone. In their article, they called for congress to halt funding to AIDS prevention organizations such as the Stop AIDS Project, claiming that money to such groups ultimately encourages risky behaviors and raises infection rates.

A member of the National Association of Lesbian and Gay Addiction Professionals said that the point of the article was to make sensational accusations against the gay community for the purpose of attracting readers to the magazine.

== Research ==
Various research articles have presented "Bug Chasers: The men who long to be HIV+" as describing bugchasing as an alleged serious public health issue and significant source of HIV transmission.

Dean, Tim. Raw: PrEP, Pedagogy, and the Politics of Barebacking New York: New York University Press, 2019.

___.Unlimited Intimacy: Reflections on the Subculture of Barebacking. Chicago: University of Chicago Press, 2009.

Shernoff, Michael. Without Condoms: Unprotected Sex, Gay Men, and Barebacking. New York: Routledge, 2006.
