= Jann Wenner =

American magazine founder (born 1946)

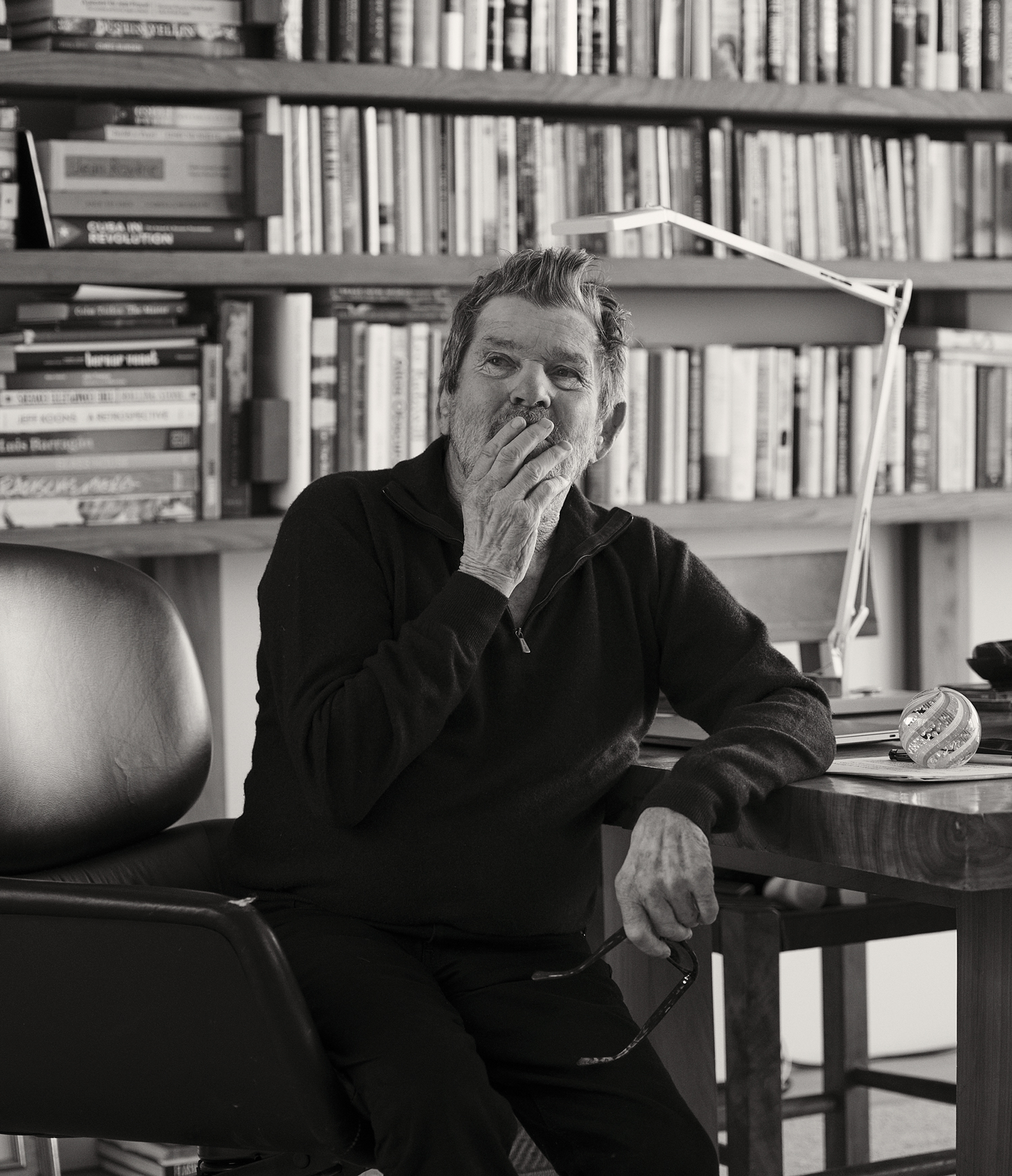
- Wenner in 2023
- Born: Jann Simon Wenner; January 7, 1946 (age 80); New York City, U.S.
- Spouse: Jane Schindelheim (m. 1967; div. 1995)
- Partner: Matt Nye (1995–present)
- Children: 6, including Gus

Jann Simon Wenner (/ˈjɑːn ˈwɛnər/ YAHN WEN-er; born January 7, 1946) is an American businessman who co-founded the popular culture magazine Rolling Stone with Ralph J. Gleason and is the former owner of Men's Journal magazine. He participated in the Free Speech Movement while attending the University of California, Berkeley. Wenner co-founded Rolling Stone in 1967.

Later in his career, Wenner co-founded the Rock and Roll Hall of Fame and founded other publications. As a publisher and media figure, he has faced controversy regarding favoritism in Hall of Fame eligibility decisions, the breakdown of his relationship with gonzo journalist Hunter S. Thompson, and criticism that his magazine's reviews were biased.

== Early life and education ==
Wenner was raised in the San Francisco Bay Area, the son of Sim and Edward Wenner. He grew up in a secular Jewish family.

His parents divorced in 1958, and he and his sisters, Kate and Merlyn, were sent to boarding schools. He completed his secondary education at the Chadwick School in 1963, and went on to attend the University of California, Berkeley. Before dropping out of Berkeley in 1966, Wenner was active in the Free Speech Movement and produced the column "Something's Happening" in the student-run newspaper, The Daily Californian. Wenner avoided the military draft by providing a letter to the draft board from a Berkeley doctor that diagnosed him with "serious personality disorder...with its concomitant history of psychiatric treatment, suicide ideation, homosexual and excessive heterosexual promiscuity, and heavy use of illegal drugs".

== Career ==
With the help of his mentor, San Francisco Chronicle jazz critic Ralph J. Gleason, Wenner landed a job at Ramparts, a high-circulation muckraker, where Gleason was a contributing editor and Wenner worked on the magazine's spinoff newspaper.

=== Rolling Stone ===
In 1967, Wenner founded Rolling Stone magazine in San Francisco. To get the magazine started, Wenner borrowed US$7,500 (equivalent to $72,418 in 2025) from family members and from the family of his soon-to-be wife, Jane Schindelheim.

Throughout the 1970s and 1980s, Wenner played an integral role in popularizing writers such as Hunter S. Thompson, Ben Fong-Torres, Paul Nelson, Greil Marcus, Dave Marsh, Grover Lewis, Timothy Crouse, Timothy Ferris, Joe Klein, Cameron Crowe, Joe Eszterhas, and P.J. O'Rourke. He also discovered photographer Annie Leibovitz when she was a 21-year-old San Francisco Art Institute student. Many of Wenner's proteges, such as Crowe, credit him with giving them their biggest breaks. Tom Wolfe recognized Wenner's influence in ensuring that his first novel, The Bonfire of the Vanities, was completed: "I was absolutely frozen with fright about getting it done and I decided to serialize it and the only editor crazy enough to do that was Jann."

In 1977, Rolling Stone shifted its base of operations from San Francisco to New York City. The magazine's circulation dipped briefly in the late 1970s and early 1980s as Rolling Stone responded slowly in covering the emergence of punk rock and again in the 1990s, when it lost ground to Spin and Blender in coverage of hip hop. Wenner hired former FHM editor Ed Needham, who was then replaced by Will Dana, to turn his flagship magazine around, and by 2006, Rolling Stone's circulation was at an all-time high of 1.5 million copies sold every two weeks. In May 2006, Rolling Stone published its 1,000th edition with a holographic, 3-D cover modeled on The Beatles' Sgt. Pepper's Lonely Hearts Club Band album cover.

Wenner has been involved in the conducting and writing of many of the magazine's Rolling Stone Interviews. His interview subjects have included Bill Clinton, Al Gore, John Kerry, and Barack Obama for the magazine during their election campaigns and in November 2005 had an interview with U2 rock star Bono, which focused on music and politics. Wenner's interview with Bono received a National Magazine Award nomination.

Rolling Stone and Wenner are chronicled in three books, Gone Crazy and Back Again by Robert Sam Anson, Rolling Stone: The Uncensored History by Robert Draper, and Sticky Fingers:The Life and Times of Jann Wenner and Rolling Stone Magazine by Joe Hagan. Robin Green's memoir The Only Girl covers the time she worked at Rolling Stone.

Wenner founded the magazine Outside in 1977; where William Randolph Hearst III and Jack Ford both worked before Wenner sold it a year later. He also briefly managed the magazine Look and, in 1993, started the magazine Family Life. In 1985, he bought a share in Us Weekly, followed by a joint purchase of the magazine with The Walt Disney Company the following year. The magazine made the transition from a monthly to a weekly in 2000. In August 2006, Wenner bought out Disney's share to consolidate 100% ownership.

From 2004 to 2006, Wenner contributed approximately US$63,000 (equivalent to $100,615 in 2025) to Democratic candidates and liberal organizations.

In September 2016, Advertising Age reported that Wenner was in the process of selling a 49% stake in Rolling Stone to Singaporean company BandLab Technologies. The new investor would have no direct involvement in the editorial content of the magazine. In October 2016, Wenner started publishing Glixel, a video games-based website.

In September 2017, Wenner Media announced that the remaining 51% of Rolling Stone was up for sale. That share was bought by Penske Media Corporation, who later acquired the remaining stake from BandLab.

In 2022, Little, Brown and Company published Wenner's memoir, Like a Rolling Stone.

== Controversies ==
=== Hunter S. Thompson ===
Hunter S. Thompson was to provide Rolling Stone coverage for the 1976 presidential campaign that would appear in a book published by the magazine's parent company, Straight Arrow Books. Reportedly, in 1975, as Thompson was waiting for a $75,000 advance check to arrive, he learned that Wenner had canceled the assignment without telling him.

Wenner then asked Thompson to travel to Vietnam to report on what turned out to be the final moments of the Vietnam War. Thompson accepted and arrived with the country in chaos, just as the United States was preparing to evacuate and other journalists were scrambling to find transportation out of the region. Thompson's story about the fall of Saigon would not be published in Rolling Stone until ten years later. Thompson contributed far less frequently to the publication in later years.

=== Hootie and the Blowfish review ===
In 1996, Wenner fired rock critic Jim DeRogatis after DeRogatis delivered a negative review for an album by the then-popular band Hootie and the Blowfish. Wenner pulled DeRogatis' review from the magazine. Asked by the New York Observer if Wenner was a fan of Hootie and the Blowfish, DeRogatis responded that Wenner "is a fan of any band that sells eight million records." Wenner fired DeRogatis the next day.

=== Sticky Fingers ===
In June 2017, Wenner cut ties with Joe Hagan, the biographer he commissioned to write his biography, Sticky Fingers, calling the book Hagan produced "deeply flawed and tawdry, rather than substantial". Hagan had been working closely with Wenner on the book since 2013, and Sticky Fingers was released in October 2017.

=== New York Times interview ===
In September 2023, Wenner was interviewed by David Marchese of The New York Times' about his book The Masters: Conversations with Dylan, Lennon, Jagger, Townshend, Garcia, Bono, and Springsteen and its basis of "seven white guys." Wenner was asked about the book's introduction, in which he claimed that black and female artists were "not in his zeitgeist." In response, Wenner said of female artists that "none of them were as articulate enough on this intellectual level" to be included in his list of masterful musicians. Of black artists Marvin Gaye and Curtis Mayfield, he said "they just didn't articulate at that level". In response, he was removed from the board of the Rock and Roll Hall of Fame Foundation the day after the interview was published. His comments were widely criticized. He issued an apology statement through his publisher, Little, Brown and Company, on September 18, 2023.

== Personal life ==
In the summer of 1967, after Rolling Stone was founded, Wenner and Jane Schindelheim were married in a small Jewish ceremony. Wenner and his wife separated in 1995, though Jane Wenner still remains a vice president of Wenner Media. She and Wenner have three sons. One of them, Edward Augustus (Gus), was made head of Wenner Media's digital operations in 2014.

Since 1995, Wenner's domestic partner has been Matt Nye, a fashion designer. Wenner and Nye have three children born via surrogate mothers.

== Awards and honors ==
- 2010: Norman Mailer Prize, Lifetime Achievement in Magazine Publishing
- 2014: Lennon-Ono Grant for Peace

== Notes ==
- Working with a small group of record company heads and music industry professionals, Wenner co-founded the Rock and Roll Hall of Fame Foundation in 1983.
- Wenner produced Boz Scaggs's self-titled major-label debut album in 1969.
- Wenner made an "appearance" in the 100th issue of Daredevil in 1973 by Marvel Comics, written by Steve Gerber and artwork by Gene Colan. In the story, Daredevil foils an attempted robbery at the Rolling Stone offices and later grants Wenner an interview detailing his origin and humble beginnings, but refuses to reveal his identity to Wenner.
- In 1985, he produced and appeared as a fictionalized version of himself (named Mark Roth) in the movie Perfect with Jamie Lee Curtis and John Travolta. He also had cameo roles in Cameron Crowe's films Jerry Maguire and Almost Famous.
- In 1985, Wenner had a Rolling Stone cover photograph of Don Johnson digitally edited to remove the handgun and holster from the Miami Vice star because of Wenner's opposition to handguns.
- The American Society of Magazine Editors inducted Wenner into their Hall of Fame in 1997, making him the youngest editor ever inducted.
- Amy Ray lambasted Wenner as "Rolling Stone's most fearless leader" in her song "Lucystoners" from her 2001 solo debut, Stag, accusing him of discriminating against women artists in favor of a "boys' club of rock."
- In 2004, Wenner was inducted into the Rock and Roll Hall of Fame in the Lifetime Achievement category.
- In the fall of 2007, Wenner published an oral biography of Hunter S. Thompson titled Gonzo: The Life of Hunter S. Thompson. Co-written with Corey Seymour, this work traces the life of Thompson as told through the stories of those closest to him.
- In March 2014, it was announced that the publisher Knopf had acquired Sticky Fingers:The Life and Times of Jann Wenner and Rolling Stone Magazine by journalist Joe Hagan for a seven-figure price. It was published in 2017 to mark the 50th anniversary of Rolling Stone.

== Select Rolling Stone Interview bibliography ==
- Bob Dylan, May 3, 2007
- Bono, November 3, 2005
- John Kerry, November 11, 2004
- Al Gore, November 9, 2000
- Mick Jagger, December 14, 1995
- Bill Clinton, December 9, 1993
- Jerry Garcia, January 20, 1972
- John Lennon, January 21, 1971
- Bob Dylan, November 29, 1969
- Pete Townshend, September 28, 1968

== See also ==
- LGBT culture in New York City
- List of LGBT people from New York City
