= Shirley Halperin =

American journalist, editor, and author

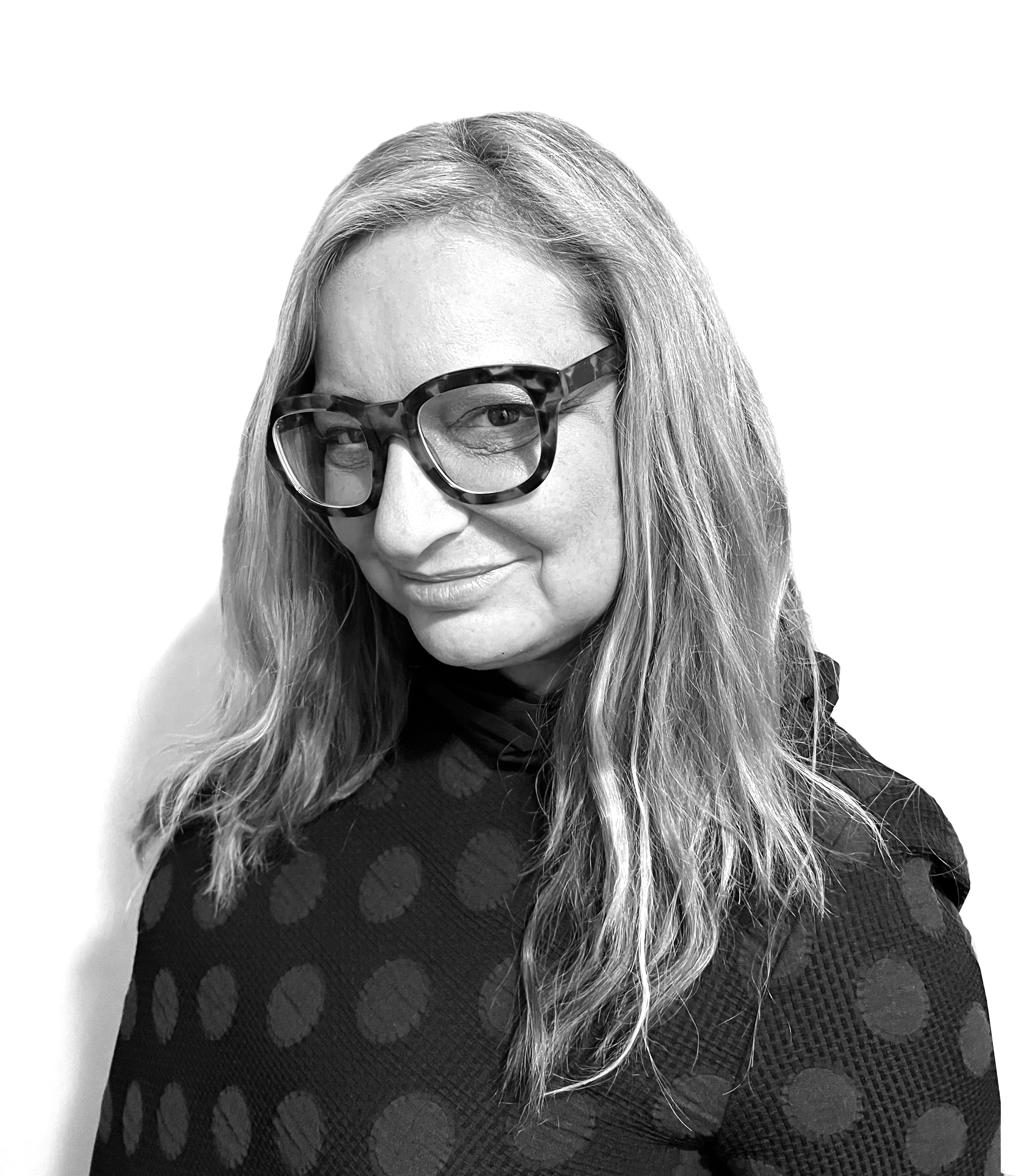
- Born: Israel
- Citizenship: United States
- Education: Rutgers University
- Occupations: Journalist; author; editor
- Years active: 1995- present
- Employer: Rolling Stone (co-editor-in-chief)

Shirley Halperin is an American journalist, editor, and author. She is the co-editor-in-chief of Rolling Stone. She is the first woman to hold this position in the magazine's nearly 60-year history.

== Early life and education ==
Halperin was raised in New Jersey. Her early exposure to music during childhood visits to Israel influenced her career in journalism. She attended Rutgers University, majoring in History and Middle Eastern studies.

== Career ==
Halperin began her journalism career in the early 1990s as an intern at High Times. She then moved to staff positions at Entertainment Weekly, Teen People, and Us Weekly.

In 2010, Halperin joined The Hollywood Reporter as music editor, later adding Billboard to her responsibilities. During her seven-year tenure, as print media transitioned to digital platforms, she oversaw the online content for the magazines.

In 2017, Halperin became executive editor of music at Variety, where she spearheaded music coverage for both the print magazine and variety.com. She also played a key role in developing high-profile industry events for Variety and Billboard.

In 2023, Halperin was appointed editor-in-chief of Los Angeles Magazine. She focused on news and culture in Los Angeles. In 2024, Halperin was appointed co-editor-in-chief of The Hollywood Reporter.

In September 2025, Halperin was named co-editor-in-chief of Rolling Stone, becoming the first woman to lead the magazine.

== Books ==
Halperin is the author of Pot Culture: The A-Z Guide to Stoner Language and Life (2008), Reefer Movie Madness (2010), and American Idol: the Official Backstage Pass (2011).

== Awards and recognition ==
Halperin has won multiple Los Angeles Press Club awards for her work at The Hollywood Reporter, Variety, and Los Angeles Magazine.
