= Unlimited Intimacy =

2009 book by Tim Dean

- Cover for Unlimited Intimacy
- Author: Tim Dean
- Subject: History of the subculture of barebacking among gay men
- Publisher: University of Chicago Press
- Publication date: 2009
- Media type: Print (paperback)
- Pages: 256
- ISBN: 9780226139395

Unlimited Intimacy: Reflections on the Subculture of Barebacking is a 2009 non-fiction academic book by queer theory professor Tim Dean on the history of the sexual practice of barebacking among gay men and the subculture it has developed. The book was published by the University of Chicago Press on June 15, 2009.

The primary discussion in the book is about how the sexual subculture of barebacking became more commonplace after the development of treatments for AIDS, resulting in the idea of what Dean terms unlimited intimacy by going beyond normal societal boundaries of sexuality. The philosophical underpinnings of the book uses ethnography to better extrapolate the subculture without conferring judgement upon it, while also incorporating how the community in question has also influenced sexual performances in pornography trends and other areas.

Highly praised by reviewers, the subversive nature of its coverage and how it went about investigating barebacking as a community was positively noted. The fact that the work's focus and conclusions run contrary to how most books in the subject area portray the practice, which usually extensively revolve around the pathological and disease aspects of barebacking, was a challenge that multiple commentators stated made Dean's research pivotal and essential reading for queer theorists and for those in the sex therapy and medical fields.

== Content ==
The book begins with an introduction section titled "Confessions of a Barebacker", which explains Dean's role as a participant-observer during the sociological investigation of the themes. As a general text, the book discusses the emergence of the barebacking subculture among gay men in San Francisco during the 1990s. The first chapter, titled "Breeding Culture", deals with this history and how this cultural development coincided with the scientific invention of highly active antiretroviral therapy (HAART) as a treatment for HIV that significantly reduced the health impacts from the AIDS condition, turning it into a chronic illness to be controlled via medication. These improvements led to a reduction in the stringency of condom use within the gay community and the creation of the barebacking subculture.

Dean's stated theoretical framework is that of psychoanalysis. While contemplating the reasons behind the barebacking subculture's formation, Dean puts forward the concept of barebacking as the "culmination of some men's desires to explore beyond their usual boundaries" and that their sexual practices allow them to create unlimited intimacy. This idea is at odds with prior research into the subject. Furthermore, Dean criticizes limitations placed on sexual encounters that prevent the potential of his intimacy concept from being achieved due to rules and role constraints within the barebacker community.

After addressing the history of the subculture, Dean's work also investigates the topic using an ethnological viewpoint that treats the group of individuals studied as a "foreign culture" that has no moral judgements attached or intended. This allowed the author to then document the "language, rituals, etiquette, institutions, [and] iconography" of the subculture. The second chapter of the book, titled "Representing Raw Sex", focuses on the expression of the subculture within society at large through the dissemination of hardcore pornography that features barebacking. This is primarily done through an analysis of films from Paul Morris' Treasure Island Media and a discussion of the infamous 2001 film Niggas' Revenge. Continuing the discussion of pornography, but from a more kink-based perspective, the third chapter titled "Viral Fetishism, Visual Fetishism" looks into how social taboos have been presented in gay pornographic films.

The final chapter titled "Cruising As a Way of Life" discusses how sexual encounters between gay men in modern times, especially with the proliferation of online options, have become less as interactions with others and more "planned as if ordering from a takeout menu". Instead of being focused on as an ethical decision, regardless of moral opinions on the subject, cruising has become focused on object-relating for personal characteristics and sexual interests.

== Critical reception ==
In a critique for the journal South Atlantic Review, Lisa Downing referred to Unlimited Intimacy as a "dazzling hybrid of a text" that utilizes a Gedankenexperiment of barebacking culture to view it as a "fantasy of kinship" that is then investigated using Levinasian ethics' withholding of judgement. While there is minor dissention by Downing on the book because of it avoiding too deep a discussion of the potential pathology and "erotic homi/sui-cidal fantasies" contained by some in the culture in order to prevent any encouragement of anti-LGBT political stances, they still found the book to be an important production that is "one of the most thought-provoking works I have read in years". Octavio R. Gonzalez, writing for Cultural Critique, referred to Dean's attempts to depathologize the subject matter as "anti-normative queer politics" that runs counter to the "liberal mainstream" of the LGBT community. Gonzalez notes that Unlimited Intimacy successfully showcases that the subject of "discomfort and risk" are themselves appropriate for academic analysis and that, despite going farther than any psychoanalyst would be comfortable in agreeing with, the work manages to be "artful because it has the capacity to make us nervous".

The Journal of Sex Research's Trevor Hoppe praised the book, but also took issue with one particular aspect of Dean's work: the underlying attempt to generalize the subculture and treat the topics of barebacking and bugchasing as "indistinguishable" in order to avoid political entanglements. Hoppe brings up that there are later media studios and aspects of the subculture that have emerged that purposefully disengage from the latter topic, the existence of which would undermine Dean's argument if discussed. Despite this omission, Hoppe considers the book an "important contribution to the discourse on gay men's sexual practices" and highly useful for both therapists and medical professions in the sex-related fields for its analysis of such stigmatized subjects. For Patrick O'Byrne in Sexualities, the "particularly thought provoking" parts of the book were those that, whether purposeful or not, engaged with the comparisons between psychoanalytic ideas and the "contra-psychoanalytic understandings of desire" as first espoused by Gilles Deleuze and Félix Guattari in their 1972 book Anti-Oedipus. Ultimately, O'Byrne's praise and strong recommendation of the publication focused on how Unlimited Intimacy uses an interpretation of the barebacking subculture that "challenged mainstream understandings" of the practice of barebacking. He also notes as a positive feature of the book the fact that it "challenges the conventions of traditional academic work on human sexuality".

Calling Unlimited Intimacy a "remarkable exploration", GLQ's Douglas Dowland considered the historical backing to the formation of the barebacking subculture to be one of the most important elements of the book, though wishes there had been a more thorough investigation into the titular concept of the book that was instead "often disregarded in lieu of anecdote and confession". It is expected by Ken Plummer in his review for Times Higher Education that the book will "infuriate many who work in the field of HIV prevention" and those in the LGBT community itself for focusing on a niche subculture that will potentially enable homophobes in their attacks on the community. However, for Plummer, his concerns more revolve around the ethical claims made by Dean about barebacking and perceived intimacy and connections while thereby downplaying the health risks of the practice.

Craig Hutchison in the journal Psychology & Sexuality admired the usage of psychoanalytic thought by Dean, specifically the return to its "radical roots" involved in the investigation of the "uncivilised and polymorphously perverse foundations of human emotion". This has resulted in a new look at the subject of HIV prevention and how the barebacking community fits into the discussion. Choice magazine's H.L. Minton said it was an "academically courageous book" and recommended it to graduate students and academic professionals.

== See also ==
- Sexual Ecology
- History of gay men in the United States
- LGBT history
- 2009 in literature
