= Meth (film) =

LBGTQ feature-length documentary

Meth is a feature-length documentary on drug abuse among gay men, released February 9, 2006. Paul Morris was a primary producer; Todd Ahlberg was the director.
