= Treasure Island Media =

American pornographic film studio

The studio logo

Treasure Island Media (also known as TIM) is an independent U.S. gay pornographic studio founded in 1998 by Paul Morris that primarily produces bareback films. It was the first commercial producer to specialize in bareback films as part of the emerging 1990s underground interest in the pre-condom era of gay porn that was concerned with the freedom of the sexual experience. The studio is named after Morris's favorite childhood book, Treasure Island. In addition to the original San Francisco office, TIM has production offices in New York, London and Mexico City.

== History ==
Paul Morris established Treasure Island Media to "preserve the integrity of pornography and the honest representation of male sexual behavior. When I started producing porn, the genre had become depressingly corrupt, representing only a small subset of sexual behaviors [...] I wanted to capture the kind of sex that has meaning for me and I wanted to do so as accurately and honestly as possible. I also wanted to document the men. I wasn't interested in what they looked like, I was interested in what they understood regarding the complex behavioral language of sex among men." He added, "Most recently, I've been motivated to produce pornography to directly address the appalling phenomenon of the HIV 'closet'."

According to XBiz, TIM's best selling video to date is Dawson's 20 Load Weekend (2004).

In 2009, the GAYVN Awards placed a lifetime ban on Treasure Island Media productions from eligibility. TIM issued a press release announcing they had also been banned from officially participating in Folsom Street Fair, Folsom North, Dore Alley, Gay Erotic Expo and International Mr. Leather. In 2011, Treasure Island Media's booth at the Folsom Street Fair was shut down by the San Francisco Police Department (SFPD). The studio was prohibited to run a booth during the event for several years because its models partook in live public sex on those booths during the event.

In 2012, TIM released Slammed, which depicted men engaging in bareback sex after injecting crystal meth. In 2015, the studio released Fuck Holes 3 (Fuck Holes franchise) which featured female Siouxsie Q and trans woman Sami Price, a casting choice that sparked a controversy among gay porn critics for bringing heterosexuality and "breeding" in gay fantasia, a "genre-busting film" according to actress Siouxsie Q.

== AIDS and safety controversies ==
In December 2010, the California Occupational Safety and Health Administration fined Treasure Island Media $21,000 for exposing employees (i.e. the models) to "semen and other potentially infectious materials". In November 2012, safe sex advocate Colby Keller performed for TIM. In 2014, Morris directed Viral Loads, a video centered on bareback sex between HIV-positive and HIV-negative men. The movie sparked a controversy for "fetishizing HIV and transmission risk". The press release stated "Mansex is a virus, one that uses men as its host. Some try to resist it. Others embrace it as the source of life and meaning. We live to breed the sex-virus, to pass it on to every random anonymous dude we meet and fuck. It’s how we reproduce, man [...] Most are poz, some are neg. Who the fuck cares?".

The AIDS Healthcare Foundation tried several times to have California's Department of Industrial Relations, Division of Occupational Safety and Health's Appeals Board force companies in the pornography industry to treat actors and actresses as employees subject to occupational safety and health regulation; in a 2014 case brought against Treasure Island Media an administrative judge found that the company did have to comply with regulations.

== Awards and nominations ==
- 2007 Best US Studio at the David Awards in Berlin (European equivalent of the GAYVN)
- 2008 Golden Dickie Awards (from Rad Video): Best Studio, Best Movie (What I Can't See 2); Best Director (Paul Morris); Best Performer Top (Jesse O'Toole); and Best Specialty/Fetish Movie (Damon Blows America 8 – Los Angeles)
- 2010 Cybersocket Web Awards: Best New Site; Best Video Company; Best VOD Site; and Movie of the Year
- 2012 Raven's Eden Awards: Winner - Best Gay Studio
- 2013 Raven's Eden Awards: Winner - Best Gay Studio; Best Bareback Movie (Manfuck Manifesto);
- 2014 Raven's Eden Awards: Winner - Best Gay Studio; Best Compilation Movie (Plantin' Seed Anthology)
- 2015 Raven's Eden Awards: Winner Best Gay Studio
- 2015 Prowler Porn Awards: Winner - Best British Scene (Nathan Gets Banged)
- 2016 Raven's Eden Awards: Winner - Best Gay Studio; Winner - Best Compilation Movie (Legendary Cocksucker: Best of Damon Dogg); Winner - Best Bareback Movie (Buggery)
- 2017 HustlaBall European Gay Porn Awards: Best Movie Scene (Take That Black Dick White Boy); Best Director (Paul Morris & Max Sohl); Best Fetish Movie (Cum Junkie); Best Movie (Cum Junkie)
- 2017 Prowler Porn Awards: Winner -Best British Fetish DVD (Public Meat)
- 2018 Prowler Porn Awards: Winner - Best European Director (Paul Stag); Winner - Best European Fetish DVD (Destroying Logan Moore)
- 2018 Hustlaball European Porn Awards: Nominee - Best Website, Winner - Best Hunk Movie (Destroying Logan Moore); Winner - Best Fetish Movie (Destroying Logan Moore)
- 2019 Prowler European Porn Awards: Nominee - Best European DVD (Destroying Logan Moore); Winner - Lifetime Achievement Award (Paul Stag; director & head of European production)

== Performer exclusives ==
- B.J. Slater
- Max Sohl
- Drew Sebastian
- John Dahl
- Ethan Wolfe
