= The Rolling Stone Interview =

The Rolling Stone Interview is a feature article in the American magazine Rolling Stone that sheds light on notable figures from the worlds of music, popular culture, or politics. Editor Jann Wenner has said that the interview is "part[ly] based on The Paris Review, which featured definitive interviews with writers like Ernest Hemingway and John Steinbeck, exploring their lives, their philosophy and their technique".

Subjects of the interviews have ranged from former presidential candidate John Kerry to the landmark December 1970 interview with John Lennon. The Rolling Stone Interviews: 1967–1980: Talking With the Legends of Rock and Roll (1989, ISBN 0312034865) is a collection of significant interviews from the magazine's first 15 years.

== Selected interviews ==
- Woody Allen, April 9, 1987
- Joan Baez, April 14, 1983
- Chuck Berry, June 14, 1969
- Bono, 2005
- David Bowie, February 12, 1976
- Marlon Brando, May 20, 1976
- Tim Burton, July 9, 1992
- David Byrne, April 21, 1988
- Johnny Carson, March 23, 1979
- Noam Chomsky, May 28, 1992
- Eric Clapton, May 11, 1968; July 18, 1974; June 20, 1985; October 17, 1991
- Bill Clinton, September 17, 1992
- Francis Ford Coppola, November 1, 1979
- Elvis Costello, September 2, 1982
- Bo Diddley, February 12, 1987
- Bob Dylan, November 29, 1969; January 26, 1978; November 16, 1978; June 21, 1984
- Clint Eastwood, July 4, 1985
- Cass Elliot, October 26, 1968
- Daniel Ellsberg, November 8, 1973
- The Everly Brothers, May 8, 1986
- John Fogerty, February 21, 1970
- Jerry Garcia, January 20, 1972; November 30, 1989
- Bob Geldof, December 5, 1985
- George Harrison, October 22, 1987
- Mick Jagger, October 12, 1968; June 29, 1978; December 14, 1995
- Steve Jobs, 2003
- Elton John, August 16, 1973
- John Lennon, November 23, 1968; January 21 & February 4, 1971; June 5, 1975
- Little Richard, May 28, 1969
- Madonna, June 13, 1991
- Rachel Maddow, June 2017
- Steve Martin, February 18, 1982
- Paul McCartney, January 31, 1974
- Stanley McChrystal, June 25, 2010
- John Mellencamp, January 18, 1986
- Joni Mitchell, July 26, 1979
- Jack Nicholson, March 29, 1984; August 14, 1986
- Sinéad O'Connor, March 7, 1991
- Jimmy Page and Robert Plant, March 13, 1975
- Brad Pitt, 2008
- Bonnie Raitt, May 3, 1990
- Lou Reed, May 4, 1989
- Keith Richards, August 19, 1971; November 12, 1981; October 6, 1988
- Linda Ronstadt, October 19, 1978
- Axl Rose, August 10, 1989; April 2, 1992
- Bernie Sanders, December 3, 2015; May 31, 2016
- Carly Simon and James Taylor, January 4, 1973
- Paul Simon, July 20, 1972
- Slash, January 24, 1991
- Grace Slick, November 12, 1970
- Patti Smith, July 27, 1978
- Susan Sontag, October 4, 1979
- Bruce Springsteen, December 6, 1984
- Howard Stern, March 16, 2011
- Sting, February 11, 1988
- Michael Stipe, March 5, 1992
- Pete Townshend, September 28, 1968
- Tina Turner, October 23, 1986
- Desmond Tutu, November 21, 1985
- Steven Tyler, November 3, 1994; May 12, 2011
- Tom Wolfe, August 21, 1980
- Neil Young, June 2, 1988
- Frank Zappa, July 20, 1968
