= Rolling Stone =

American monthly music magazine

- The cover of the 1,000th edition of Rolling Stone, May 18 – June 1, 2006
- Co-editors-in-chief: Sean Woods; Shirley Halperin
- Categories: Popular culture
- Frequency: Monthly
- Publisher: Brian Szejka
- Total circulation: 423,377 (June 2023)
- Founder: Jann Wenner; Ralph J. Gleason
- First issue: November 9, 1967; 59 years ago
- Company: Penske Media Corporation
- Country: United States
- Based in: 475 Fifth Avenue, 10th Floor, New York City, U.S.
- Language: English
- Website: rollingstone.com
- ISSN: 0035-791X (print); 3066-0580 (web)
- OCLC: 969027590

Rolling Stone is an American monthly magazine that focuses on music, politics, and popular culture. It was founded in San Francisco, California, in 1967 by Jann Wenner and the music critic Ralph J. Gleason. It is described as left-leaning and liberal.

The magazine was first known for its coverage of rock music and political reporting by Hunter S. Thompson. In the late 1990s, the magazine broadened and shifted its focus to a younger readership interested in youth-oriented television shows, film actors, and popular music. It has since returned to its traditional mix of content, including music, entertainment, and politics.

The first magazine was released in 1967 and featured John Lennon on the cover, and was then published every two weeks. It is known for provocative photography and its cover photos, featuring musicians, politicians, athletes, and actors. In addition to its print version in the United States, it publishes content through Rollingstone.com and numerous international editions.

The magazine experienced a rapid rise during the 1970s, followed by a sharp decline into financial turmoil in the 21st century, leading Jann Wenner to sell 49 percent of the magazine to BandLab Technologies in 2016 and 51 percent to Penske Media Corporation (PMC) in 2017. PMC eventually acquired the 49 percent stake from BandLab Technologies in 2019, giving it full ownership of the magazine.

== History ==
=== 1967–1979: Founding and early history ===
Rolling Stone was founded in San Francisco in 1967 by Jann Wenner and Ralph J. Gleason. To pay for the setup costs, Wenner borrowed $7,500 (equivalent to $72,000 in 2025) from his family and the parents of his soon-to-be wife, Jane Schindelheim. The first issue was released on October 18, 1967, cover dated to November 9, 1967. It featured John Lennon in costume, wearing a Brodie helmet for the film How I Won the War on the cover. It was in tabloid-sized pulp newsprint format, with a lead article on the Monterey International Pop Festival. The cover price was 25¢ (equivalent to $2.27 in 2023) and it was published bi-weekly.

In the first issue, Wenner explained the magazine's title and mission:

You're probably wondering what we're trying to do. It's hard to say: sort of a magazine and sort of a newspaper. The name of it is Rolling Stone, which comes from an old saying, "A rolling stone gathers no moss." Muddy Waters used the name for a song he wrote. The Rolling Stones took their name from Muddy's song. Like a Rolling Stone was the title of Bob Dylan's first rock and roll record. We have begun a new publication reflecting what we see are the changes in rock and roll and the changes related to rock and roll.

Some authors have attributed the name solely to Dylan's hit single: "At [Ralph] Gleason's suggestion, Wenner named his magazine after a Bob Dylan song." In a 2017 article celebrating the publication's 50th anniversary, Rolling Stone's David Browne stated that the magazine's name was a nod to the Rolling Stones in an addition to "Rollin' Stone" and "Like a Rolling Stone".

Rolling Stone initially identified with and reported on the hippie counterculture of the era. It distanced itself, however, from the underground newspapers of the time, such as the Berkeley Barb, embracing more traditional journalistic standards and avoiding the radical politics of the underground press. In the first edition, Wenner wrote that Rolling Stone "is not just about the music, but about the things and attitudes that music embraces". One interviewee, speaking for many of his peers, said that he bought his first copy of the magazine upon initial arrival on his college campus, describing it as a "rite of passage".

The magazine's long-running slogan, "All the news that fits", which first appeared in 1969, was provided by early contributor, manager, and sometime editor Susan Lydon. She lifted it from an April Fools' Day issue of the Columbia Daily Spectator that boasted "All the news that fits we print", which itself was a parody of The New York Times' famous slogan, "All The News That's Fit To Print".

In the 1970s, Rolling Stone began to make a mark with its political coverage, with the likes of gonzo journalist Hunter S. Thompson writing for the magazine's political section. Thompson first published his most famous work, Fear and Loathing in Las Vegas (1971), within the pages of Rolling Stone, where he remained a contributing editor until his death in 2005. In the 1970s, the magazine also helped launch the careers of many prominent authors, including Cameron Crowe, Lester Bangs, Joe Klein, Joe Eszterhas, Ben Fong-Torres, Patti Smith and P. J. O'Rourke.

Some of Rolling Stone's most famous stories were published during this period. The January 21, 1970 cover story about the Altamont Free Concert and the killing of Meredith Hunter received a Specialized Journalism award at the National Magazine Awards in 1971. Later that year, Rolling Stone published a 30,000-word feature on Charles Manson by David Dalton and David Felton, including their interview of Manson when he was in the L.A. County Jail awaiting trial, which won the magazine its first National Magazine Award. Four years later, they also covered the Patty Hearst abduction odyssey.

In 1972, Wenner assigned Tom Wolfe to cover the launch of NASA's last Moon mission, Apollo 17. He published a four-part series in 1973 titled "Post-Orbital Remorse", about the depression that some astronauts experienced after having been in space. After the series, Wolfe began researching the whole of the space program, in what became a seven-year project from which he took time to write The Painted Word (1975), a book on art, and to complete Mauve Gloves & Madmen, Clutter & Vine (1976), a collection of shorter pieces and eventually The Right Stuff (1979).

The magazine began running the photographs of Annie Leibovitz in 1970. In 1973, she became its chief photographer, and her images appeared on more than 140 covers. Rolling Stone recruited writers from smaller music magazines, including Paul Nelson from Sing Out!, who became record reviews editor from 1978 to 1983, and Dave Marsh from Creem. In 1977, the magazine moved its headquarters from San Francisco to New York City. Editor Jann Wenner said that San Francisco had become "a cultural backwater".

=== 1980–1999: Change to entertainment magazine ===
Kurt Loder joined Rolling Stone in May 1979 and spent nine years there, including as editor. Timothy White joined as a writer from Crawdaddy and David Fricke from Musician. Tom Wolfe wrote to Wenner to propose an idea drawn from Charles Dickens and William Makepeace Thackeray: to serialize a novel. Wenner offered Wolfe around $200,000 to serialize his work. The frequent deadline pressure gave Wolfe the motivation he had sought, and from July 1984 to August 1985, he published a new installment in each biweekly issue of Rolling Stone. Later Wolfe was unhappy with his "very public first draft" and thoroughly revised his work, even changing his protagonist, Sherman McCoy, and published it as The Bonfire of the Vanities in 1987.

Rolling Stone was known for its musical coverage and for Thompson's political reporting and in 1985, they hired an advertising agency to refocus its image under the series "Perception/Reality" comparing Sixties symbols to those of the Eighties, which led to an increase in advertising revenue and pages. It also shifted to more of an entertainment magazine in the 1980s. It still had music as the main topic but began to increase its coverage of celebrities, films, and pop culture. It also began releasing its annual "Hot Issue". As Rolling Stone began to focus on subjects other than music, a sister publication named Record Magazine was launched in November 1981. Record focused only on music. It was short-lived, and folded in 1985.

In the 1990s, Rolling Stone changed its format to appeal to a younger readership interested in youth-oriented television shows, film actors, and popular music. This led to criticism that the magazine was emphasizing style over substance.

=== 2000–2015: Expansion of readership ===
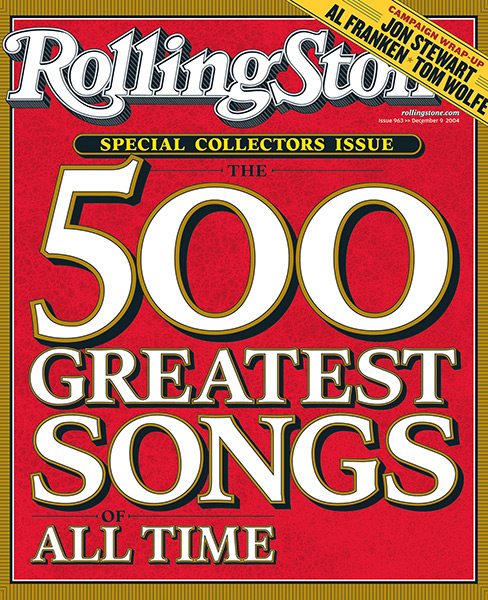
Rolling Stone cover from 2004

After years of declining readership, the magazine experienced a major resurgence of interest and relevance with the work of two young journalists in the late 2000s, Michael Hastings and Matt Taibbi. Rob Sheffield also joined from Spin. In 2005, Dana Leslie Fields, former publisher of Rolling Stone, who had worked at the magazine for 17 years, was an inaugural inductee into the Magazine Hall of Fame. In 2009, Taibbi unleashed an acclaimed series of scathing reports on the financial meltdown of the time. He famously described Goldman Sachs as "a great vampire squid".

In December 2009, the Los Angeles Times reported that the owners of Rolling Stone magazine planned to open a Rolling Stone restaurant in the Hollywood & Highland Center in Hollywood in the spring of 2010. The expectation was that the restaurant could become the first of a national chain if it was successful. As of November 2010, the "soft opening" of the restaurant was planned for December 2010. In 2011, the restaurant was open for lunch and dinner as well as a full night club downstairs on the weekends. The restaurant closed in February 2013.

Bigger headlines came at the end of June 2010. Rolling Stone caused a controversy in the White House by publishing in the July issue an article by journalist Michael Hastings entitled "The Runaway General", quoting criticism by General Stanley A. McChrystal, commander of the International Security Assistance Force and U.S. Forces-Afghanistan commander, about Vice President Joe Biden and other Administration members of the White House. McChrystal resigned from his position shortly after his statements went public. In 2010, Taibbi documented illegal and fraudulent actions by banks in the foreclosure courts, after traveling to Jacksonville, Florida and sitting in on hearings in the courtroom. His article, "Invasion of the Home Snatchers", also documented attempts by the judge to intimidate a homeowner fighting foreclosure and the attorney Taibbi accompanied into the court.

In January 2012, the magazine ran exclusive excerpts from Hastings' book just prior to publication. The book, The Operators: The Wild and Terrifying Inside Story of America's War in Afghanistan, provided a much more expansive look at McChrystal and the culture of senior American military and how they become embroiled in such wars. The book reached Amazon.com's bestseller list in the first 48 hours of release, and it received generally favorable reviews. Salon's Glenn Greenwald described it as "superb", "brave" and "eye-opening". In 2012, Taibbi, through his coverage of the Libor scandal, emerged as an expert on that topic, which led to media appearances outside Rolling Stone. On November 9, 2012, the magazine published its first Spanish-language section on Latino music and culture, in the issue dated November 22.

=== 2016–present: New ownership ===
In September 2016, Advertising Age reported that Wenner was in the process of selling a 49% stake of the magazine to a company from Singapore called BandLab Technologies. The new investor had no direct involvement in the editorial content of the magazine.

In September 2017, Wenner Media announced that the remaining 51% of Rolling Stone magazine was up for sale. In December 2017, Penske Media acquired the remaining stake from Wenner Media. It became a monthly magazine from the July 2018 issue. On January 31, 2019, Penske acquired BandLab's 49% stake in Rolling Stone, gaining full ownership of the magazine.

In January 2021, a Chinese edition of the magazine was launched, while in September 2021, Rolling Stone launched a dedicated UK edition in conjunction with Attitude magazine publisher Stream Publishing. The new British Rolling Stone launched into a marketplace which already featured titles like Mojo and BandLab Technologies's monthly music magazine Uncut. The first issue had a choice of three cover stars (including music acts Bastille and Sam Fender, as well as No Time To Die actor Lashana Lynch), with the magazine due to be a bi-monthly publication.

In February 2022, Rolling Stone announced the acquisition of Life Is Beautiful, saying, "Live events are an integral part of Rolling Stone's future."

In 2023 Rolling Stone was nominated for its first-ever Emmy award in the "Outstanding Interactive Media" category for its investigation into "The DJ and the War Crimes". The piece also won a National Magazine Award for digital design and an Overseas Press Club Award. In December 2023 Rolling Stone collected five National Arts & Entertainment Journalism Awards, four Front Page Awards, and a Deadline Club award.

In August 2025, Rolling Stone named Sean Woods and Shirley Halperin as co-editors in chief, with Halperin also becoming the magazine's head of music. Halperin is Rolling Stone's first female editor-in-chief.

== Covers ==
Some artists have been featured on the cover many times, and some of these pictures went on to become iconic. The Beatles, for example, have appeared on the cover more than 30 times, either individually or as a band. The magazine is known for provocative photography and has featured musicians and celebrities on the cover throughout its history. The cover of the issue from January 22, 1981, featuring John Lennon and Yoko Ono, has been called the "Greatest Rolling Stone Cover Ever" by Vanity Fair.

The first ten issues featured, in order of appearance:

1. John Lennon
2. Tina Turner
3. The Beatles
4. Jimi Hendrix, Donovan and Otis Redding
5. Jim Morrison
6. Janis Joplin
7. Jimi Hendrix
8. Monterey International Pop Festival
9. John Lennon and Paul McCartney
10. Eric Clapton

The magazine spent $1 million (equivalent to $1.6 million in 2025) on the 3-D hologram cover of the special 1,000th issue (May 18, 2006) displaying multiple celebrities and other personalities.

=== Print format ===
The printed format has gone through several changes. The first publications, in 1967 to 1972, were in folded tabloid newspaper format, with no staples, only black ink text, and a single color highlight that changed each edition. From 1973 onwards, editions were produced on a four-color press with a different newsprint paper size. In 1979, the bar code appeared. In 1980, it became a gloss-paper, large-format (10 × 12 inch) magazine. Editions switched to the standard 8 × 11 inch magazine size starting on October 30, 2008. Starting with the new monthly July 2018 issue, it returned to the previous 10 × 12 inch large format. In June 2024, the magazine was redesigned with new exclusive fonts and a grittier paper stock.

== Website ==
The publication's site at one time had an extensive message-board forum. By the late 1990s, this had developed into a thriving community, with many regular members and contributors worldwide. However, the site was also plagued with numerous Internet trolls, who vandalized the forum substantially. The magazine abruptly deleted the forum in May 2004, then began a new, much more limited message board community on their site in late 2005, only to remove it again in 2006. In March 2008, the website started a new message board section once again, then deleted it in April 2010.

Rolling Stone devotes one of its table of contents pages to promoting material currently appearing on its website, listing detailed links to the items.

On April 19, 2010, the website underwent a redesign and began featuring the complete archives of Rolling Stone. The archive was first launched under a for-pay model, but has since transitioned to a free-with-print-subscription model. In the spring of 2012, Rolling Stone launched a federated search feature, which searches both the website and the archive.

The website has become an interactive source of biographical information on music artists in addition to historical rankings from the magazine. Users can cross-reference lists and they are also provided with historical insights. For example, one group that is listed on both Rolling Stone's 500 Greatest Albums of All Time and Rolling Stone's 500 Greatest Songs of All Time is Toots and the Maytals, with biographical details that explain how the band coined the term "reggae" in their song "Do the Reggay". For biographical information on all artists, the website contains a directory listed alphabetically.

=== Glixel ===
In May 2016, Wenner Media announced plans to create a separate online publication dedicated to the coverage of video games and video game culture. Gus Wenner, Jann Wenner's son and head of digital for the publication at the time, told The New York Times that "gaming is today what rock 'n' roll was when Rolling Stone was founded". Glixel launched as a weekly digital newsletter hosted on Rolling Stone's website, and transitioned to its own domain by October 2016. The site was headed by general manager John Davison and content director Simon Cox, and its offices were located in San Francisco. Articles from Glixel were included on the Rolling Stone website, while writers for Rolling Stone were also able to contribute to Glixel.

In June 2017, Rolling Stone closed down the Glixel offices and fired the entire staff, citing the difficulties of working with the remote site from their main New York office. Brian Crecente, founder of Kotaku and co-founder of Polygon, was hired as editorial director, and ran the site from the main New York office. Following the sale of Rolling Stone's assets to Penske Media Corporation, the Glixel content was merged into the routine publishing of Variety, with Crecente remaining as editorial director.

== Political alignment ==
In 2017, Graham Ruddick of The Guardian described Rolling Stone as a "rock'n'roll magazine turned liberal cheerleader". Bruce Schulman wrote in The Washington Post that Rolling Stone has "routinely support[ed] liberal candidates and causes" since the 1990s.

In 2008, conservative columnist Jonah Goldberg stated that Rolling Stone had "essentially become the house organ of the Democratic National Committee". Rolling Stone editor Jann Wenner has made all of his political donations to Democrats, and has conducted high-profile interviews for the magazine with Presidents Bill Clinton and Barack Obama. Rolling Stone endorsed Democratic candidate Hillary Clinton in the run-up for the 2016 U.S. presidential election.

Rolling Stone has criticized Republican Presidents George W. Bush and Donald Trump. In 2006, it described Bush as the "worst president in history". In August 2017, the cover of the magazine featured Canadian prime minister Justin Trudeau of the Liberal Party of Canada with the headline "Why can't he be our president?"

== Criticism and controversies ==
One major criticism of Rolling Stone involves its generational bias toward the 1960s and 1970s. One critic referred to the magazine's "500 Greatest Songs" list as an example of "unrepentant rockist fogeyism". In further response to this issue, rock critic Jim DeRogatis, a former Rolling Stone editor, published a thorough critique of the magazine's lists in a book called Kill Your Idols: A New Generation of Rock Writers Reconsiders the Classics, which featured differing opinions from many younger critics.

Rolling Stone has been criticized for reconsidering many classic albums that it had previously dismissed, and for frequent use of the 3.5-star rating. For example, Led Zeppelin was largely written off by Rolling Stone critics during the band's most active years in the 1970s, but by 2006, a cover story on the band honored them as "the Heaviest Band of All Time". A critic for Slate magazine described a conference at which 1984's The Rolling Stone Record Guide was scrutinized. As he described it, "The guide virtually ignored hip-hop and ruthlessly panned heavy metal, the two genres that within a few years would dominate the pop charts. In an auditorium packed with music journalists, you could detect more than a few anxious titters: How many of us will want our record reviews read back to us 20 years hence?"

The hiring of former FHM editor Ed Needham in 2002 further enraged critics who alleged that Rolling Stone had lost its credibility.

The 2003 "100 Greatest Guitarists of all Time" list, which named only two female musicians, resulted in Venus Zine answering with their own list, entitled "The Greatest Female Guitarists of All Time".

Rolling Stone film critic Peter Travers has been criticized for his high number of repetitively used blurbs.

=== Homosexual HIV story ===
In 2003, the article "Bug Chasers: The men who long to be HIV+" claimed that homosexuals who intentionally sought to be infected with HIV accounted for 25% of new cases each year. However, the physicians cited in the article later denied making such statements.

=== Anti-vaccine article ===
In 2005, the article "Deadly Immunity", by anti-vaccine activist Robert F. Kennedy Jr., attracted criticism for quoting material out of context, and Rolling Stone eventually amended the story with corrections in response to these and other criticisms.

=== Tsarnaev cover ===
The August 2013 Rolling Stone cover, featuring then-accused (and later convicted) Boston Marathon bomber Dzhokhar Tsarnaev, drew widespread criticism for "glamorizing terrorism", and was called a "slap in the face to the great city of Boston". The online edition of the article was accompanied by a short editorial stating that the story "falls within the traditions of journalism and Rolling Stone's long-standing commitment to serious and thoughtful coverage of the most important political and cultural issues of our day". The controversial cover photograph that was used by Rolling Stone had previously featured on the front page of The New York Times on May 5, 2013.

In response to the outcry, New England–based CVS Pharmacy and Tedeschi Food Shops banned their stores from carrying the issue. They were later joined by Walgreens, Rite Aid, Kmart, Roche Bros., Stop & Shop, H-E-B, Walmart, 7-Eleven, Hy-Vee, Rutter's Farm, United Supermarkets, Cumberland Farms, Market Basket, and Shaw's.

Boston mayor Thomas Menino sent a letter to Rolling Stone publisher Jann Wenner, calling the cover "ill-conceived, at best [...] [it] reaffirms a message that destruction gains fame for killers and their 'causes'." Menino also wrote, "To respond to you in anger is to feed into your obvious market strategy", and that Wenner could have written about the survivors or the people who came to help after the bombings instead. In conclusion he wrote, "The survivors of the Boston Marathon deserve Rolling Stone cover stories, though I no longer feel that Rolling Stone deserves them."

=== Defamatory false rape story and lawsuit ===
On November 19, 2014, the magazine ran the story "A Rape on Campus", about an alleged gang rape on the campus of the University of Virginia. Separate inquiries by Phi Kappa Psi, the fraternity accused by Rolling Stone of facilitating the alleged rape, and The Washington Post revealed major errors, omissions and discrepancies in the story. Reporter Sabrina Erdely's story was subject to intense media criticism. The Washington Post and Boston Herald issued calls for magazine staff involved in the report to be fired. Rolling Stone subsequently issued three apologies for the story.

On December 5, 2014, Rolling Stone's managing editor, Will Dana, apologized for not fact-checking the story. The magazine commissioned an outside investigation of the story and its problems by the dean of the Columbia School of Journalism. The report uncovered journalistic failure in the UVA story and institutional problems with reporting at Rolling Stone. Rolling Stone retracted the story on April 5, 2015. The next day, following the investigation and retraction of the story, Phi Kappa Psi announced plans to pursue all available legal action against Rolling Stone, including claims of defamation.

On May 12, 2015, UVA associate dean Nicole Eramo, chief administrator for handling sexual assault issues at the school, filed a $7.5 million defamation lawsuit in Charlottesville Circuit Court against Rolling Stone and Erdely, claiming damage to her reputation and emotional distress. Said the filing, "Rolling Stone and Erdely's highly defamatory and false statements about Dean Eramo were not the result of an innocent mistake. They were the result of a wanton journalist who was more concerned with writing an article that fulfilled her preconceived narrative about the victimization of women on American college campuses, and a malicious publisher who was more concerned about selling magazines to boost the economic bottom line for its faltering magazine, than they were about discovering the truth or actual facts." On November 4, 2016, after 20 hours of deliberation, a jury consisting of eight women and two men found Rolling Stone, the magazine's publisher and Erdely liable for defaming Eramo, and awarded Eramo $3 million.

On July 29, 2015, three graduates of the fraternity Phi Kappa Psi filed a lawsuit against Rolling Stone, its publisher Wenner Media, and a journalist for defamation and infliction of emotional distress. The same day, and just months after the controversy began, The New York Times reported that managing editor Will Dana was departing the magazine with his last date recorded as August 7, 2015. On November 9, 2015, the Phi Kappa Psi Fraternity filed suit for $25 million for damages to its reputation caused by the magazine's publication of the story, "with reckless disregard for the truth". Rolling Stone paid the fraternity $1.65 million to settle the suit out of court.

=== Ethics controversy over El Chapo interview ===
In 2016, Rolling Stone commissioned Sean Penn to write a feature on Joaquín "El Chapo" Guzmán in what was billed as a landmark story and Guzmán's first-ever interview. Penn met Guzmán, then wanted by Mexican and U.S. authorities, at a jungle hideout for an interview, which was agreed to by Guzmán on the condition he have final editorial control over the article. Upon publication, the article, characterized by the Associated Press as "long and rambling", was extensively mocked by social media users and prompted a discussion about the magazine's ethical standards. Andrew Seaman, chairman of the ethics committee of the Society of Professional Journalists, called the decision to allow a source pre-approval of an article "inexcusable", while the Poynter Institute's chief ethicist Kelly McBride opined that the article evidenced several failures of editorial control by Rolling Stone. In an interview with NPR, Alfredo Corchado, a former Mexico City bureau chief for the Dallas Morning News, said that pre-approval rights meant the story was not real journalism: "It's business, it's Hollywood. It's more in the lines of what a public relations firm would do."

Questions also arose as to whether relaxed security procedures by the magazine helped authorities track and capture Guzmán, who was arrested several days after the interview was conducted. Meanwhile, Kate del Castillo, who arranged the meeting, said that she had to flee the country after the article's publication, and charged that Penn had "used me as a bait, and then he never protected me. And risked my life and my parents' life and my sister's life and everybody surrounding me."

Penn later said his article "had failed", noting that discussion about the ethics of the story overshadowed the actual report.

=== False ivermectin story ===
In September 2021, Rolling Stone picked up a story published by Oklahoma news outlet KFOR which claimed that so many people had been hospitalized due to ivermectin overdoses in Oklahoma that there was no room in intensive care units for other patients, including those with gunshot wounds. However, an Oklahoma hospital said in a statement that there was no shortage of beds due to ivermectin overdoses, and the doctor who had been interviewed by KFOR had not said that ivermectin cases were crowding out other patients, but the initial story and subsequent coverage had linked separate comments about ivermectin overdoses and scarce beds. CNN fact-checker Daniel Dale stated that Rolling Stone had "[run] an adaptation of the KFOR story without appearing to do sufficient research to make sure the local report was sound". Rolling Stone subsequently added an editor's note that retracted the core point of its story.

Kyle Smith of National Review called Rolling Stone's correction "so humiliating, it's a wonder the place doesn't shut its doors immediately, liquidate all assets, and deny that it ever existed." Robby Soave of Reason said that the correct story was "something Rolling Stone could have figured out on its own had the magazine bothered to contact any hospitals in Oklahoma, but alas." Alex Shephard of The New Republic wrote, "For mainstream and, particularly, liberal media this should be a stark reminder of the value of due diligence and checking sources. At the very least, make a phone call."

=== Taylor Hawkins article ===
In 2022, Rolling Stone published an article on the death of Foo Fighters drummer Taylor Hawkins, which was strongly criticized by Matt Cameron and Chad Smith, who were quoted in the article under the belief that it would be a "celebratory... retrospective."

=== Claims of gatekeeping and exclusion ===
The magazine has been criticized in the past for what critics say involves a history of excluding and minimizing women and POC in music In September 2023, in the wake of Jann Wenner's comments that woman and Black artists were not "articulate enough" nor "in the zeitgeist" of their time to merit attention in his book of interviews, commentators and critics brought up claims of a history of the magazine having not hired Black writers and Wenner's preference for covering white artists while excluding other acts, as well as criticism of the magazine's outsized influence on popular culture in doing so. In the wake of Wenner's comments, Joe Hagan, the author of the Wenner biography Sticky Fingers, wrote that the magazine and Wenner had been built on "not interviews, but transactions" with Wenner forming social relationships with music stars such as John Lennon, as well as the magazine under Wenner not looking to change with the music world, including downplaying emergent genres such as punk rock and hip hop early on.

=== James Gordon Meek child pornography case ===
On January 31, 2023, ABC News reporter James Gordon Meek was arrested by the FBI and charged with transporting child pornography. Rolling Stone initially broke the story, but did not mention the child sexual abuse images that led to the investigation, which were known to the reporters. Instead, it suggested that Meek had been "targeted" by the US government for his reporting on national security issues, writing that "Meek appears to be on the wrong side of the national-security apparatus". In the following months, it was revealed that Rolling Stone editor Noah Shachtman, who personally knows Meek and is considered friendly with him, had the story rewritten before publication to exclude all mentions of the child sexual abuse material, without the original journalist Tatiana Siegel's knowledge.

== In popular culture ==
George Harrison's 1975 song "This Guitar (Can't Keep from Crying)", a lyrical sequel to his Beatles track "While My Guitar Gently Weeps" (1968), references the magazine in its second verse: "Learned to get up when I fall / Can even climb Rolling Stone walls". The song was written in response to some highly unfavorable reviews from Rolling Stone and other publications for Harrison's 1974 North American tour and his album Dark Horse.

The 2000 film Almost Famous centers on a teenage journalist writing for the magazine in the early 1970s while covering the fictional band Stillwater. The film was directed by Cameron Crowe and was based on his own experiences as a young journalist for the magazine in the same time period.

"The Cover of Rolling Stone" is a song written by Shel Silverstein and first recorded by American rock band Dr. Hook & the Medicine Show. The song satirizes success in the music business; the song's narrator laments that his band, despite having the superficial attributes of a successful rock star (including drug usage, "teenage groupies, who'll do anything we say", and a frenetic guitar solo), has been unable to "get their pictures on the cover of the Rolling Stone".

The title track of Pink Floyd's album The Final Cut features the line, "Would you sell your story to Rolling Stone?"

The track "Baker Street Muse" on Jethro Tull's album Minstrel in the Gallery includes the line "I have no time for Time Magazine or Rolling Stone".

Charlie Robison's 1998 song "Sunset Boulevard" name-drops the magazine with the line, "Well, I wish I had my picture on the Rolling Stone today".

In Stephen King's novel Firestarter, the protagonists decide to tell their story to Rolling Stone.

In Joni Mitchell's song "California", the magazine is referenced in the line, "Reading Rolling Stone reading Vogue".

In May 2022, the off-Broadway play Retraction, adapted from the "A Rape on Campus" article controversy and resulting legal battles, premiered at Theatre Row in New York City. In January 2026, Retraction opened off-Broadway at the Sheen Center.

In her memoir, Writing and Madness in a Time of Terror, author Afarin Majidi describes a sexually abusive work environment at Rolling Stone and how she was sexually assaulted while freelancing there.

== International editions ==
As of 2026, 16 international editions of Rolling Stone are in operation, the first international edition of the magazine was Rolling Stone Australia launched in 1969 and the most recent latest is Rolling Stone Canada re-launched in January 2026.

- Rolling Stone Africa / Rolling Stone Afrique – Published by the Mwankom Group since 2024 and based in Lagos, Nigeria.
- Rolling Stone Argentina – Published by La Nación since April 1998. The magazine is also circulated in Bolivia, Paraguay, and Uruguay.
- Rolling Stone Australia / New Zealand – First published in 1969 as a supplment in Revolution, Australian Rolling Stone became an independent title in 1971. Published by Philip Frazer, then Silvertongues (1974–1987) and by Nextmedia until 2008. The magazine was closed in 2018, then relaunched in 2020 as Rolling Stone Australia and in 2022 it became Rolling Stone AU / NZ. Separate websites operate for Australia and New Zealand but the print edition is combined and circulated in both countries.
- Rolling Stone Brasil – An unofficial edition published for a short period from 1972. The magazine was officially launched in 2006 by Spring Comunicações; physical editions published until 2018, after which the magazine migrated online.
- Rolling Stone Canada – Published from the 1970s or 1980s. Relaunched in January 2026.
- Rolling Stone En Español – Published since 2002 for Mexico and Latin America. Published by PRISA from November 2002 to May 2009. Then from June 2009 by Editorial Televisa (subsidiary of Televisa).
- Rolling Stone France – First launched in 1988 and published till 2007, then from 2008 to 2016 by 1633sa and since 2019 by RS France.
- Rolling Stone Germany – Published since 1994 by Axel Springer AG.
- Rolling Stone India – Launched in March 2008 by MW.Com.
- Rolling Stone Italia – Published from 1980 to 1982. Relaunched in November 2003 by IXO Publishing and then till April 2014 by Editirice Quadratum. The magazine became online only in 2019 now under the control of Luciano Bernardini de Pace Editore.
- Rolling Stone Japan – Launched in March 2007 by International Luxury Media. Published by atomixmedia Inc. (株式会社アトミックスメディア, KK atomikkusumedia) since 2011.
- Rolling Stone Korea – Launched in 2020 for South Korea.
- Rolling Stone Middle East and North Africa – Launched in 2010 by HGW Media as Rolling Stone Middle East, the magazine was later closed and relaunched in 2025 as Rolling Stone MENA.
- Rolling Stone Philippines – Launched in December 2024 by Modern Media Group.
- Rolling Stone Québec – Launched in 2024 for Quebec, the magazine is published in French and English.
- Rolling Stone UK – Published as Friends of Rolling Stone, later shortened to Friends and eventually Frendz, from 1969 to 1972. In September 2021, the magazine was relaunched as Rolling Stone UK.

=== Defunct ===
- Piedra Rodante – Mexican edition, eight issues published between 1971 and 1972 by Editores Tribales, S.A.
- Rolling Stone Bulgaria – Published from 2009 to 2011 by Sivir Publications.
- Rolling Stone Chile – Published from 2003 to 2011, El Mercurio took over publication from Edu Comunicaciones in 2006.
- Rolling Stone China – Published by One Media Group from 2005 to 2006, based in Hong Kong. The magazine was relaunched in 2021; based in Beijing and Chengdu. The Chinese edition once again ceased publication after only a year closing in 2022.
- Rolling Stone España – Published from 1999 to 2015 by PROGRESA, from Madrid.
- Rolling Stone Indonesia – Published from 2005 to 2017 by PT a&e Media.
- Rolling Stone New Zealand – Published first in the mid-1970s and later in the early 1980s.
- Rolling Stone Russia – Published from 2004 to 2017 by Motor Media.
- Rolling Stone South Africa – Published from 2011 to 2014 by 3i Publishing.
- Rolling Stone Türkiye – Published from 2006 to 2009 GD Gazete Dergi.
- Serbo-Croatian Rolling Stone – Published from 2013 to 2015 by S3 Mediji. The magazine was circulated around former Yugoslav-countries, published in Serbo-Croatian and based in Zagreb.

== See also ==
- The Rolling Stone Interview
- Counterculture of the 1960s
- Rolling Stone charts
- List of underground newspapers of the 1960s counterculture

== Sources ==
- Green, Robin (August 21, 2018). The Only Girl: My Life and Times on the Masthead of Rolling Stone. Little, Brown. ISBN 978-0-316-44005-9. The Only Girl (book)
- Hagan, Joe (October 24, 2017). Sticky Fingers: The Life and Times of Jann Wenner and Rolling Stone Magazine. Knopf Doubleday Publishing Group. ISBN 978-1-101-87438-7.
- Hjort, Christopher (2008). So You Want to Be a Rock 'n' Roll Star: The Byrds Day-by-Day 1965–1973. London: Jawbone Press. ISBN 978-1-906002-15-2.
- Macadams, Lewis (October 2007). Jann Wenner and His Times. Random House. ISBN 978-0-224-07349-3.
- Ragen, Brian Abel (2002). Tom Wolfe: A Critical Companion. Westport, Connecticut: Greenwood Press. ISBN 0-313-31383-0.
- Wenner, Jann S. (September 13, 2022). Like a Rolling Stone: A Memoir. Little, Brown. ISBN 978-0-316-41539-2.
