= Up Your Alley Fair =

Leather and fetish event in San Francisco, California

- Frequency: Annually, last Sunday of July
- Locations: Folsom Street and Dore Street, San Francisco, United States
- Inaugurated: 1985
- Most recent: July 26, 2026
- Attendance: 15,000 (estimate)
- Website: www.folsomstreet.org/up-your-alley

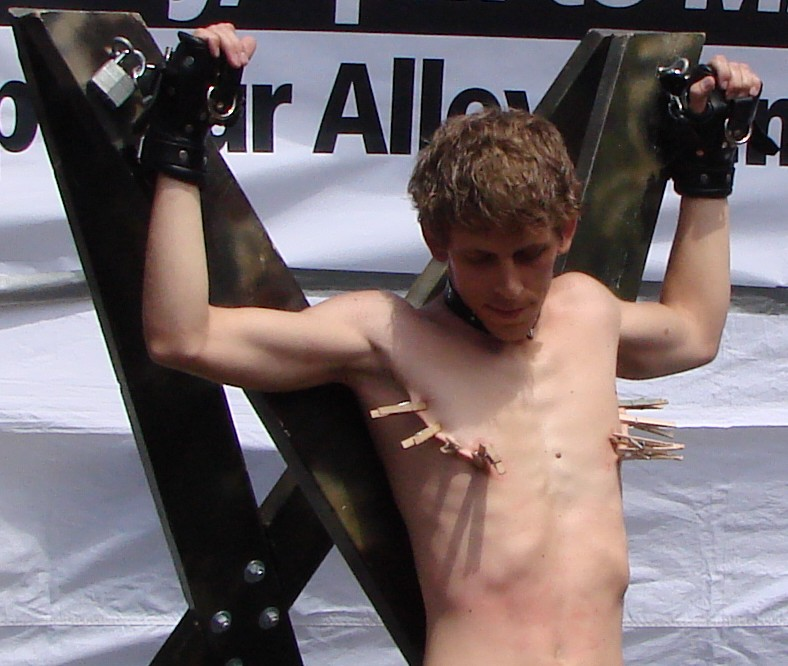
A bondage demonstration involving a clothespin zipper at Up Your Alley Fair

The Up Your Alley Fair, most commonly referred to by locals as Dore Alley Fair or simply Dore Alley /ˈdɔːri/, is a leather and fetish event held in San Francisco, California. The fair takes place annually on the last Sunday of July, and is centered on Dore Street and Folsom Street.

Up Your Alley Fair is run by the same non-profit organization that organizes the Folsom Street Fair, the world's largest BDSM fetish and leather event. It serves as a "warm-up" event for the organizers and a less tourist-focused event for locals, and it is more focused on gay men, although it is open to attendees of all genders and sexual orientations.

Attractions include vendors for fetishwear and related products, public sex and play, STI testing, and sound stages for DJs and dancing, with the addition of shows including drag and wrestling in 2026.

== History ==
The first Up Your Alley Street Fair was held in 1985 on Ringold Street between 8th and 9th streets. The event was moved to its current location on Folsom Street at Dore Street in 1987. Among the original rationales for this fair was to illustrate, in the face of redevelopment pressures, that the South of Market neighborhood was already home to a leather subculture and that this community was still active and organized in spite of the AIDS pandemic.

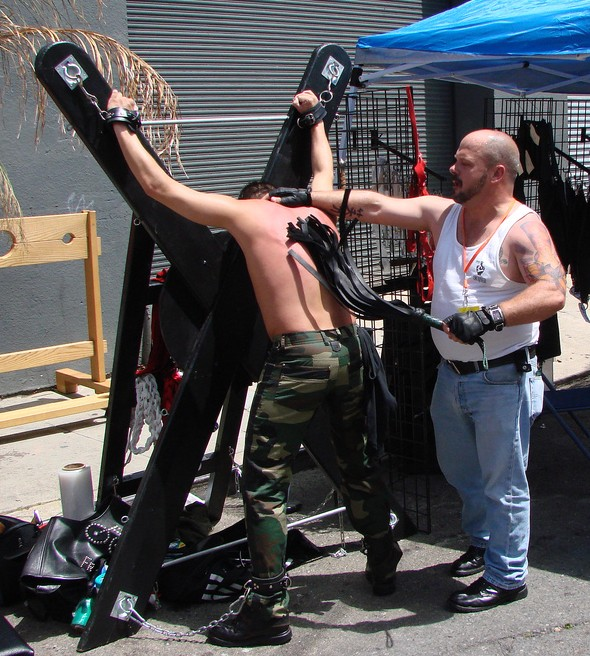
A BDSM whipping demonstration

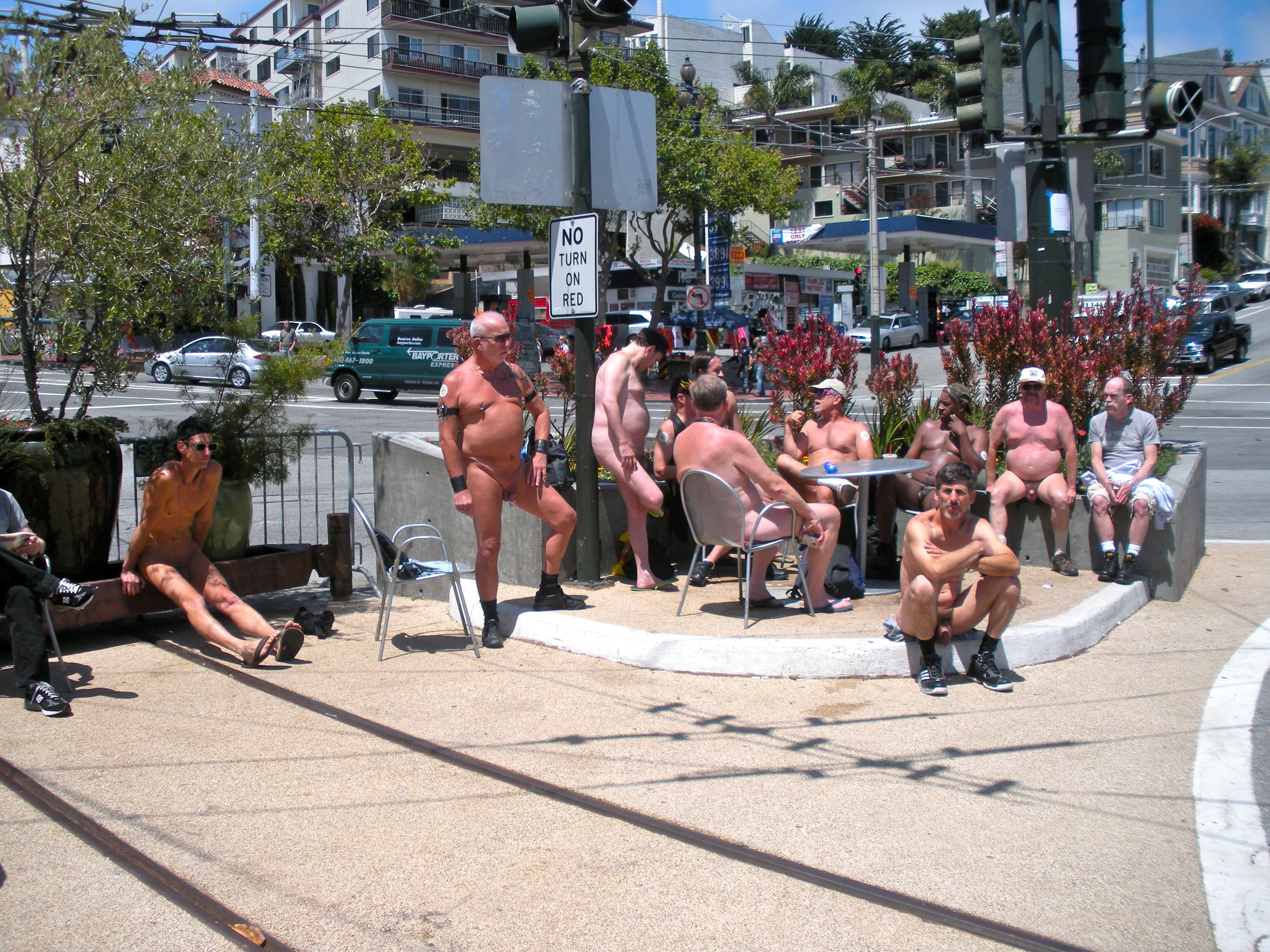
Men resting at Nude-In event

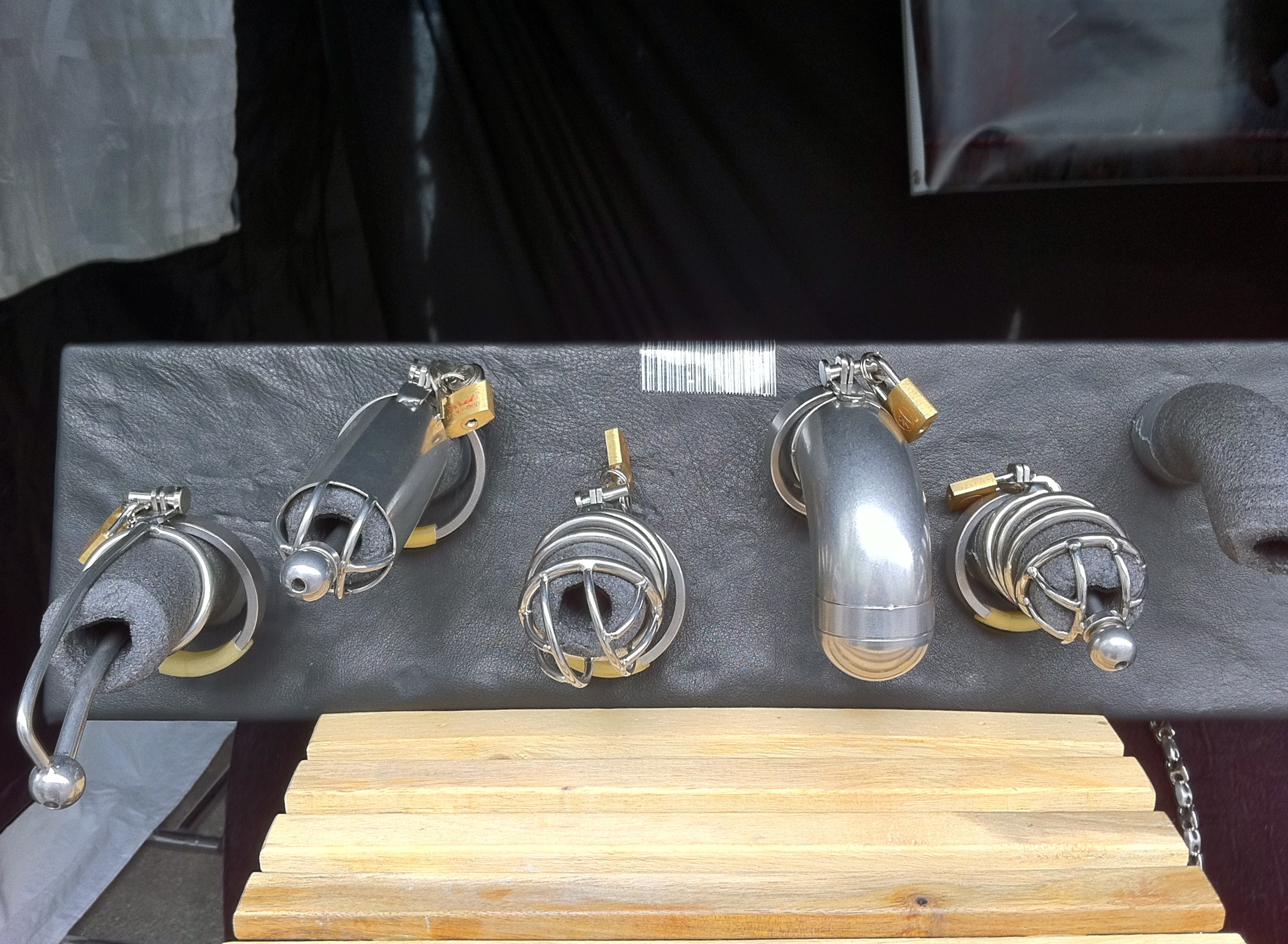
Chastity devices on display

By 2015, the fair drew crowds of approximately 15,000 people.

In 2020, both the Up Your Alley Fair and Folsom were cancelled as a result of the COVID-19 pandemic.

In 2026, the fair's footprint expanded to accommodate growing attendance, taking place between 8th and 11th Streets, remaining centered on Dore Street, and reaching from Howard Street to Harrison Street.

== See also ==
- Folsom Street Fair
- Social nudity in San Francisco
