= Tim Dean =

British academic and queer theorist

Timothy J. Dean is a British academic, author, notable in the field of contemporary queer theory, and author of several works on the subject: Gary Snyder and the American Unconscious (1991), Beyond Sexuality (2000), and Unlimited Intimacy: Reflections on the Subculture of Barebacking (2009), all published by the University of Chicago Press, and a co-editor of Homosexuality and Psychoanalysis (2001). Dean published Hatred of Sex together with Oliver Davis in 2022.

Dean first became a British civil servant before attending the University of East Anglia, during which time he participated in a Junior Year Abroad program at Brandeis University, and wrote his undergraduate dissertation on Gary Snyder before graduating BA with First Class Honours in American Studies. He subsequently earned his PhD at Johns Hopkins University (doctoral dissertation on Hart Crane). He was a Fellow at the Stanford Humanities Center (1997-1998). He teaches at the University of Illinois (Urbana-Champaign).

== Publications ==
=== Monographs ===
- Gary Snyder and the American Unconscious. University of Chicago Press, 1991.
- Dean, Tim (2000). Beyond Sexuality. University of Chicago Press. ISBN 0-226-13935-2.
- Unlimited Intimacy: Reflections on the Subculture of Barebacking. University of Chicago Press, 2009.
- Hatred of Sex. University of Nebraska Press, 2022. With Oliver Davis.

=== Edited volumes ===
- Homosexuality and Psychoanalysis (2001) – co-edited by Dean
