= Bareback sex =

Sexual penetration without the use of a condom

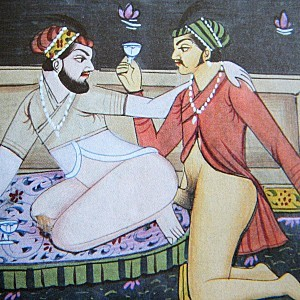
Sexual penetration without the use of a condom is known as barebacking. Typically, it refers to condomless anal sex between men.

Bareback sex is physical sexual activity, especially sexual penetration, without the use of a condom. The topic primarily concerns anal sex between men without the use of a condom, and may be distinguished from unprotected sex because bareback sex denotes the deliberate act of forgoing condom use.

== Etymology ==
A slang term, bareback sex comes from the equestrian term bareback, which is the practice of riding a horse without a saddle.

It is not known when the term (as sexual slang) was first used, although its use did gain momentum in the 1960s with the first appearance in print (as analogous reference) occurring in 1968. The term was used by G.I.s during the Vietnam War when sex without the use of a condom was known as "going in" or "riding" bareback. The term was included in the 1972 publication, Playboy's Book of Forbidden Words: A Liberated Dictionary of Improper English.

The term appeared occasionally in print until the 1980s and then in context to the AIDS epidemic and the discussion of sexual practices. It did not have widespread use in LGBT culture until 1997, when there was an increase of discussion regarding condomless sex (as reflected in print publications).

The term bareback sex is now used less frequently among heterosexuals. A 2009 survey by the New York City Department of Health and Mental Hygiene found that heterosexual women are more likely to have unprotected anal intercourse than gay and bisexual men.

== History and culture ==
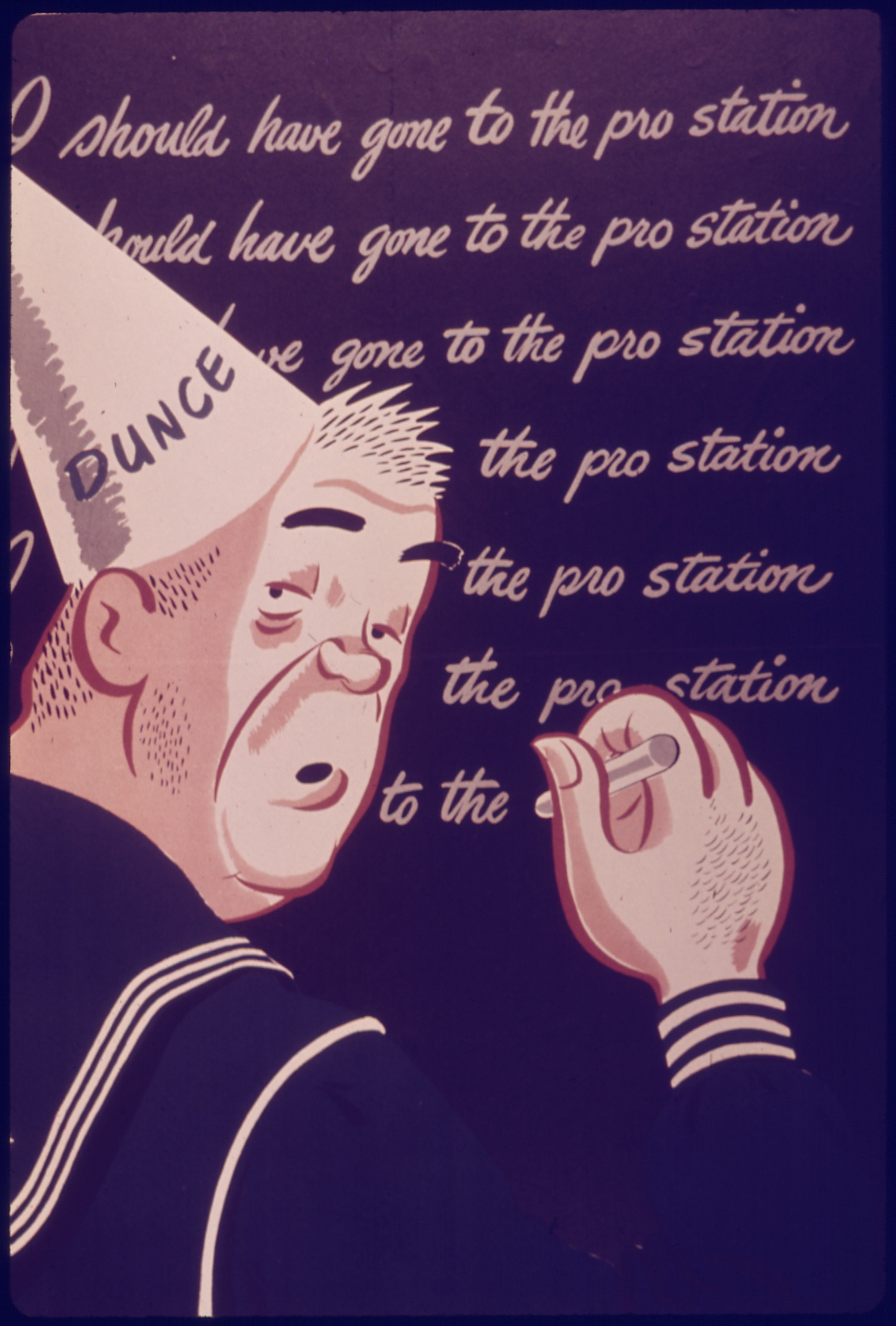
"I should have gone to the pro station". WWII-era poster promoting condom use.

Initially used for contraceptive purposes, condoms also came to be used to limit or prevent sexually transmitted infections (STIs), even after other contraceptive methods were developed. As AIDS emerged and the sexual transmission of HIV became known in the 1980s, the use of condoms to prevent infection became much more widespread, especially among men who have sex with men (MSM) who engage in anal sex. At the beginning of the AIDS crisis, in the context of the invention and development of safe sex, the uptake of condoms among Western MSM was so widespread and effective that condom use became established as a norm for sex between men. From 1995, several high-profile HIV positive men declared their refusal to wear condoms with other HIV positive men in gay publications, dubbing the practice barebacking. While these early articulations of barebacking expressed a concern for HIV prevention, in that they generally referred to dispensing with condoms in the context of sex between people of the same HIV status, the moral panic which ensued was so pronounced that barebacking came to be framed as a rebellious and transgressive erotic practice for HIV positive and HIV negative people alike, irrespective of the risks of HIV transmission.

=== Resurgence and stigma ===
A resurgence of barebacking in first-world gay communities during the 1990s has been a frequent topic for gay columnists and editorialists in The Advocate, Genre magazine, and Out magazine. Many of these articles express concern over bareback sex's popularity, and liken it to irresponsible and reckless behavior, despite the fact that a third of gay men take part in the practice. Some of the reasons listed for the resurgence are: the recent perception of HIV as a treatable illness one can live with, insufficient sex education, use of drugs such as methamphetamine in sexual settings, and fetishization of bareback sex on various porn and dating sites.

Academic works suggest that barebacking is a way to reach for transcendence, to overcome the boredom of everyday average life in a hyper-rationalized society. Some men are dispensing with condoms in the context of seroconcordant sex (sex between two men of the same HIV status). Early articulations of barebacking generally refer to sex between two HIV-positive men, whereby barebacking could be considered an early harm reduction strategy, similar to serosorting, which was later endorsed by some public health authorities in the USA.

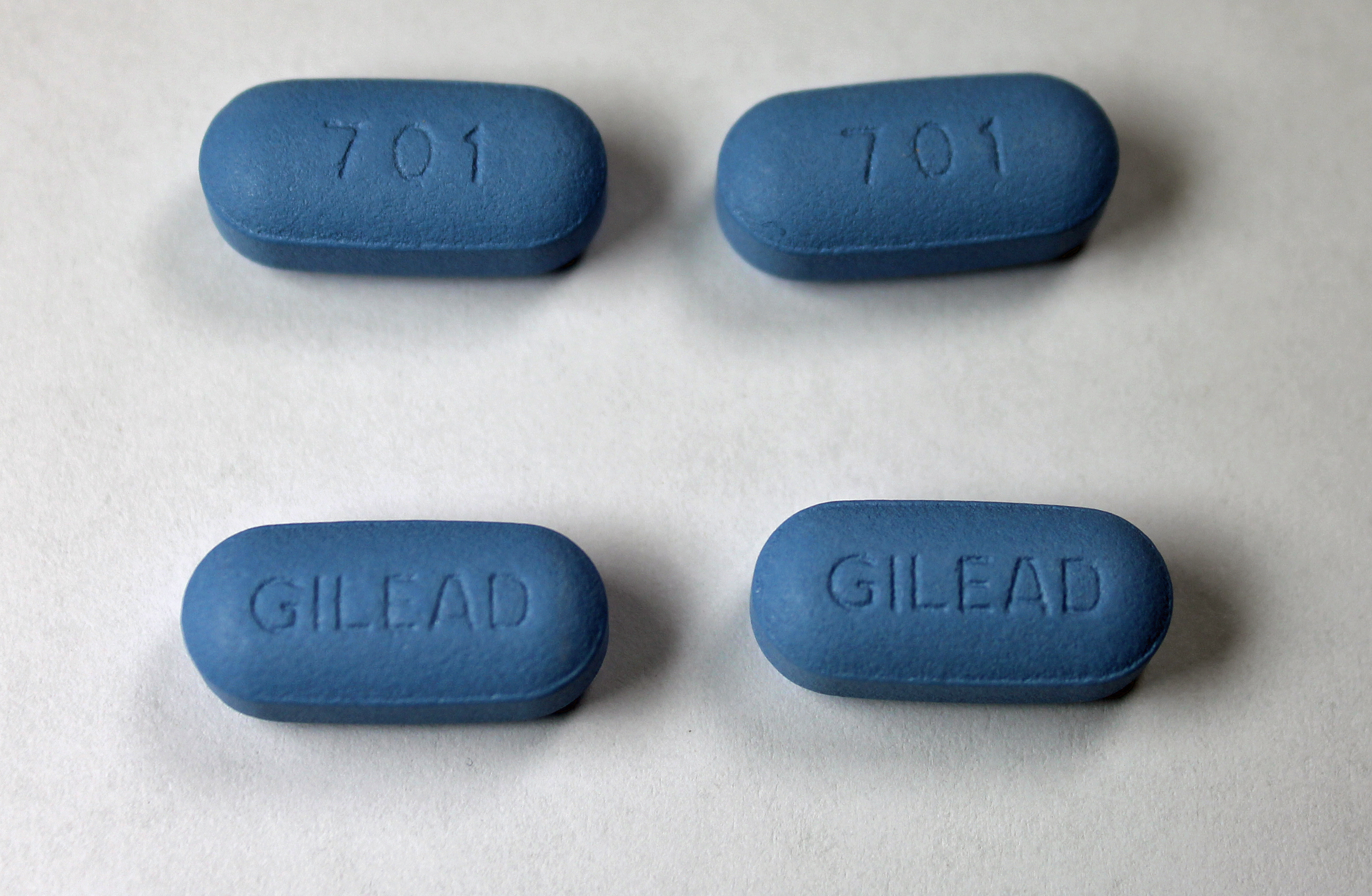
Tablets of Truvada, a tenofovir/emtricitabine combination used for HIV pre-exposure prophylaxis

Bareback sex has also become more acceptable since the introduction of pre-exposure prophylaxis (PrEP). One of the most popular forms of PrEP is Truvada, a medication previously taken for HIV treatment that, when taken properly, has been shown to prevent HIV-negative users from contracting HIV from infected partners. While these drugs do not necessarily prevent the transmission of other STIs, they have stirred a discussion on what "safe" sex without the use of condoms really entails.

A 2005 study concluded that the resurgence of barebacking led to an increase in sexually transmitted infections among the MSM community. The study found that of the 448 men who were familiar with barebacking, nearly half reported they had bareback sex in the last three months. In the San Francisco study, fewer men reported engaging in barebacking when the behavior was defined as intentional unprotected anal intercourse with a non-primary partner. Using this definition, 14% of the 390 men who were aware of barebacking reported engaging in the behavior in the past two years. The study also found that HIV-positive MSM were more likely to have bareback sex than were HIV-negative MSM.

=== Gay pornographic films ===
Bareback gay pornography was standard in "pre-condom" films from the 1970s and early 1980s. As awareness of the risk of AIDS developed, pornography producers came under pressure to use condoms, both for the health of the performers and to serve as role models for their viewers. By the early 1990s new pornographic videos usually featured the use of condoms for anal sex. However, beginning in the 1990s, an increasing number of studios have been devoted to the production of new films featuring men engaging in unprotected sex. Mainstream gay pornographic studios have also continued to feature the occasional bareback scene. Also, mainstream studios that consistently use condoms for anal sex scenes may sometimes choose editing techniques that make the presence of condoms somewhat ambiguous and less visually evident, and thus may encourage viewers to fantasize that barebacking is taking place, even though the performers are following safer-sex protocols. (In contrast, some mainstream directors use close-up shots of condom packets being opened, etc., to help clearly establish for the viewer that the sex is not bareback.)

== Health risks ==
In addition to sexually transmitted infections, mechanical trauma are the same as in anal sex. Unprotected anal sex is a risk factor for formation of antisperm antibodies (ASA) in the recipient. In some people, ASA may cause autoimmune infertility. Antisperm antibodies can impair fertilization, negatively affect the implantation process, and impair growth and development of the embryo.

== See also ==
- Creampie (sexual act)
- HIV superinfection
- Saddlebacking
- Sexual practices between men
- Condom fatigue
