= Stalking the Billion-Footed Beast =

1989 essay by Tom Wolfe

"Stalking the Billion-Footed Beast" is an essay by Tom Wolfe that appeared in the November 1989 issue of Harper's Magazine criticizing the American literary establishment for retreating from realism.

== Background ==
After being serialized in Rolling Stone magazine, Wolfe's first novel, The Bonfire of the Vanities, was published in 1987. Prior to the novel, Wolfe had made his career as a journalist and author of non-fiction books. He had been a pioneer of New Journalism, a style of non-fiction that relied heavily on novelistic techniques such as the use of scene, dialogue, first-person point of view from the subjects of the stories and recording minute details of everyday routine.

In The Bonfire of the Vanities, Wolfe used many of the writing techniques in his journalism, but this time to tell what he called a "fictional novel" (though novel traditionally denotes fiction and is hence redundant, Wolfe's New Journalism was sometimes described as non-fiction novels). In addition, Wolfe set out in the novel to capture the spirit of New York City in the 1980s. The book was a commercial success, becoming a New York Times Best Seller and earning critical praise.

== Essay ==
In his Harper's essay, Wolfe (at the time a contributing editor of the magazine) argues that American authors had strayed far from the tradition of realism seen in the writing of giants of American literature like Ernest Hemingway, William Faulkner and John Steinbeck.

Wolfe uses his own writing to illustrate his point: when he wrote The Electric Kool-Aid Acid Test, he expected a novelist to write a great fictional tale about the hippie movement; after writing Radical Chic & Mau-Mauing the Flak Catchers, about racial strife in cities in the 1960s and 1970s, he expected great novels to follow suit; after The Right Stuff, he expected a novel about astronauts and NASA. Wolfe says that, to his surprise, great novels on these cultural movements never arrived:

Publishers, "Had their noses pressed against their thermopane glass walls scanning the billion-footed city for the approach of the young novelists who, surely, would bring them the big novels of the racial clashes, the hippie movement, the New Left, the Wall Street boom, the sexual revolution, the war in Vietnam. But such creatures, it seemed, no longer existed. The strange fact of the matter was that young people with serious literary ambitions were no longer interested in the metropolis or any other big, rich slices of contemporary life."

Wolfe places the split from realism at 1960, after which the literary establishment turned to absurdist novels, magical realism, minimalism, postmodernism and foreign writers, "the gods of the new breed." Wolfe singles out Milan Kundera, Jorge Luis Borges, Samuel Beckett, Vladimir Nabokov, Harold Pinter, Italo Calvino and Gabriel García Márquez as exemplars of this new obsession. Wolfe sees these trends as the novel sliding into irrelevancy. Wolfe concludes that authors must return to realism: "If fiction writers do not start facing the obvious, the literary history of the second half of the twentieth century will record that journalists not only took over the richness of American life as their domain but also seized the high ground of literature itself."

== Reception ==
Wolfe's essay caused an uproar among writers, literary critics and journalists. Three months after the essay appeared, author Robert Towers wrote in The New York Times, "I cannot offhand recall an article in a small magazine making a bigger splash in the literary pool than Tom Wolfe's manifesto..." For months after the essay, Wolfe appeared on television and on the lecture circuit defending and debating his thesis. While some critics agreed with Wolfe, others took issue with his essay, stating that he essentially had argued that other writers need to be more like himself.

Critics also noted that while many authors wrote the sorts of books Wolfe criticized, there were countless authors like Don DeLillo or John le Carré, Louise Erdrich or Toni Morrison, who wrote realism and were critically praised. The Times described the essay as "one part serious argument with two parts calculated provocation," noting that the essay had helped continue discussion (and boost sales) of The Bonfire of the Vanities. Others were outright dismissive, with author Jim Harrison opining that Wolfe's ideas were "the Babbitry of art in a new, white suit."

Wolfe wrote later works in the genre of "fictional novels," 1998's A Man in Full and 2004's I Am Charlotte Simmons. The essay launched a feud between Wolfe and other prominent literary figures that never ended. In 2000, he called John Irving, John Updike and Norman Mailer, "the three stooges" in response to their criticisms of his novels. Irving, for example, had dismissed Wolfe's work as "yak" and "journalistic hyperbole." Similar name-calling surrounded the release of I Am Charlotte Simmons. The essay was also cited and critiqued in Jonathan Franzen's essay "Perchance to Dream".

== See also ==
- Death of the novel
