= Back to Blood =

2012 novel by Tom Wolfe

- First edition
- Author: Tom Wolfe
- Language: English
- Publisher: Little, Brown and Company
- Publication date: October 23, 2012
- Publication place: United States
- Media type: Print (hardcover and paperback)
- Pages: 704
- ISBN: 978-0316036313

Back to Blood is Tom Wolfe's fourth and final novel, published on October 23, 2012 by Little, Brown and Company. The novel is set in Miami and focuses on Cuban immigrants.

== Background ==
Wolfe's 1998 novel A Man in Full, about a real-estate mogul in Atlanta during that city's economic boom of the 1990s, was a considerable success. An estimated 1.4 million copies of the book were sold in hardcover alone. Wolfe followed A Man in Full with 2004's I Am Charlotte Simmons, the story of a sheltered teenage girl attending a fictitious prestigious university where she is forced to navigate the world of undergraduate athletics, emerging sexuality, and academic integrity. The book was considered disappointing by many critics, and sales were much lower: Nielsen BookScan placed hardback sales at 293,000 copies and paperback sales at 138,000.

All of Wolfe's books had been published by Farrar, Straus and Giroux since his first book The Kandy-Kolored Tangerine-Flake Streamline Baby was published in 1965. But after the relatively disappointing sales of I Am Charlotte Simmons, Wolfe was unable to agree on terms for the new novel with his publisher of 42 years. The Associated Press reported that Wolfe had been offered a reduced advance for Back to Blood. An excerpt from the novel was shown to several publishers; Wolfe sold the rights to publish his novel to Little, Brown and Company for a sum of close to US$7 million, according to The New York Times, in an auction that ended shortly before Christmas of 2007.

== Content ==
Even before the novel was finished, some details were reported in the media. The novel has been described as Wolfe's take on "class, family, wealth, race, crime, sex, corruption and ambition in Miami, the city where America's future has arrived first." Racial anxieties were a key source of tension in The Bonfire of the Vanities, and Back to Blood similarly features characters of Cuban, Haitian, Russian, and French ancestry in the melting pot of Miami.

Of the subject matter, Wolfe said, "Two years ago when I got the idea of doing a book on immigration, people would say, 'Oh, that’s fascinating,' and then they would go to sleep standing up like a horse. Since then the subject has become a little more exciting, and in Miami, it's not only exciting, it’s red hot." Wolfe, who was well known for the depth of reporting that went into his novels, generated anticipation for the novel through his extensive reporting. The Wall Street Journal reported that Miami book retailers anticipated strong sales for the novel.

== Release and reception ==
Back to Blood was released on October 23, 2012 to mixed reviews. It debuted at #4 on the New York Times Hardcover Fiction Best Seller list on November 11, 2012 and it remained on the list for three weeks. The book was ultimately deemed a commercial failure, selling only 62,000 copies as of February 2013, according to BookScan.

In The New York Times' review, novelist Thomas Mallon said the book contained many of Wolfe's familiar "trappings and tropes. Cars and impulses still go 'out for a romp' and 'off the leash'; aspirant thugs even now walk with the 'Pimp Roll; and The City Light still publishes in New York. ... These repetitions don’t feel the least bit irritating: the effects are too good to retire, and their deployment serves to stitch Wolfe’s oeuvre into the single, big Balzacian chronicle he’s always had a mind to produce."

British novelist James Lasdun, who reviewed the book for The Guardian, liked the second half a lot more than the first, which he described as "uniformly awful. There was a time when Wolfe's sharp eye and acid tongue seemed the perfect instruments for conveying the everlasting face-off between elite and street that generates so much of the theatre of American life. But in Back to Blood those instruments have largely been replaced by a megaphone."
