= From Bauhaus to Our House =

Book by Tom Wolfe

- First edition
- Author: Tom Wolfe
- Language: English
- Genre: Art criticism
- Publisher: Farrar, Straus & Giroux
- Publication date: 1981
- Publication place: United States
- Media type: Print
- Pages: 143
- ISBN: 0-374-15892-4
- OCLC: 7734777

From Bauhaus to Our House is a 1981 narrative of Modern architecture, written by Tom Wolfe.

== Background ==
In 1975 Wolfe made his first foray into art criticism with The Painted Word, in which he argued that art theory had become too pervasive because the art world was controlled by a small elitist network of wealthy collectors, dealers and critics. Art critics were, in turn, highly critical of Wolfe's book, arguing that he was a philistine who knew nothing of what he wrote.

After The Painted Word, Wolfe published a collection of his essays, Mauve Gloves & Madmen, Clutter & Vine (1976), and his history of the earliest years of the space program, The Right Stuff (1979). Undeterred by the hostile critical response to The Painted Word, and perhaps even encouraged by the stir the book made, Wolfe set about writing a critique of modern architecture. From Bauhaus to Our House was published in full in two issues of Harper's Magazine, then issued in book form by Wolfe's long-time publisher Farrar, Straus & Giroux in 1981.

== Themes ==
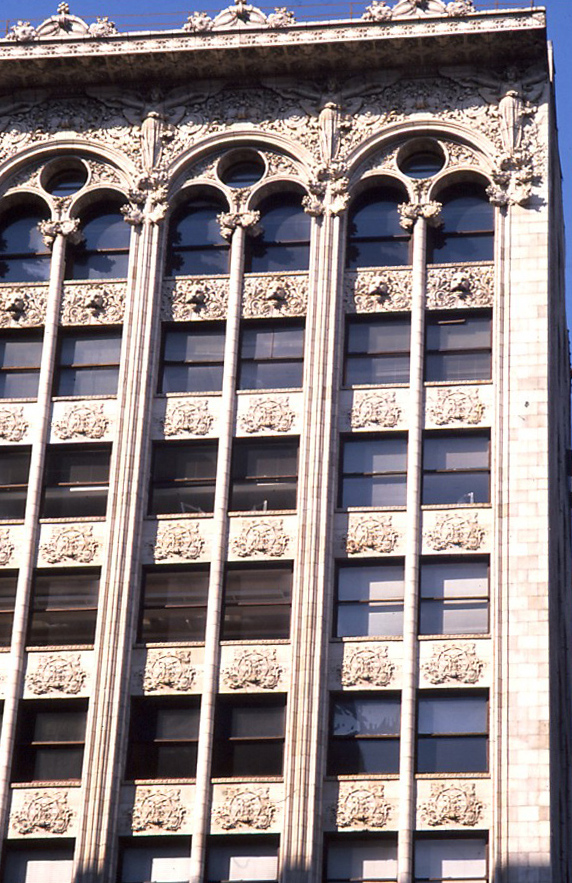
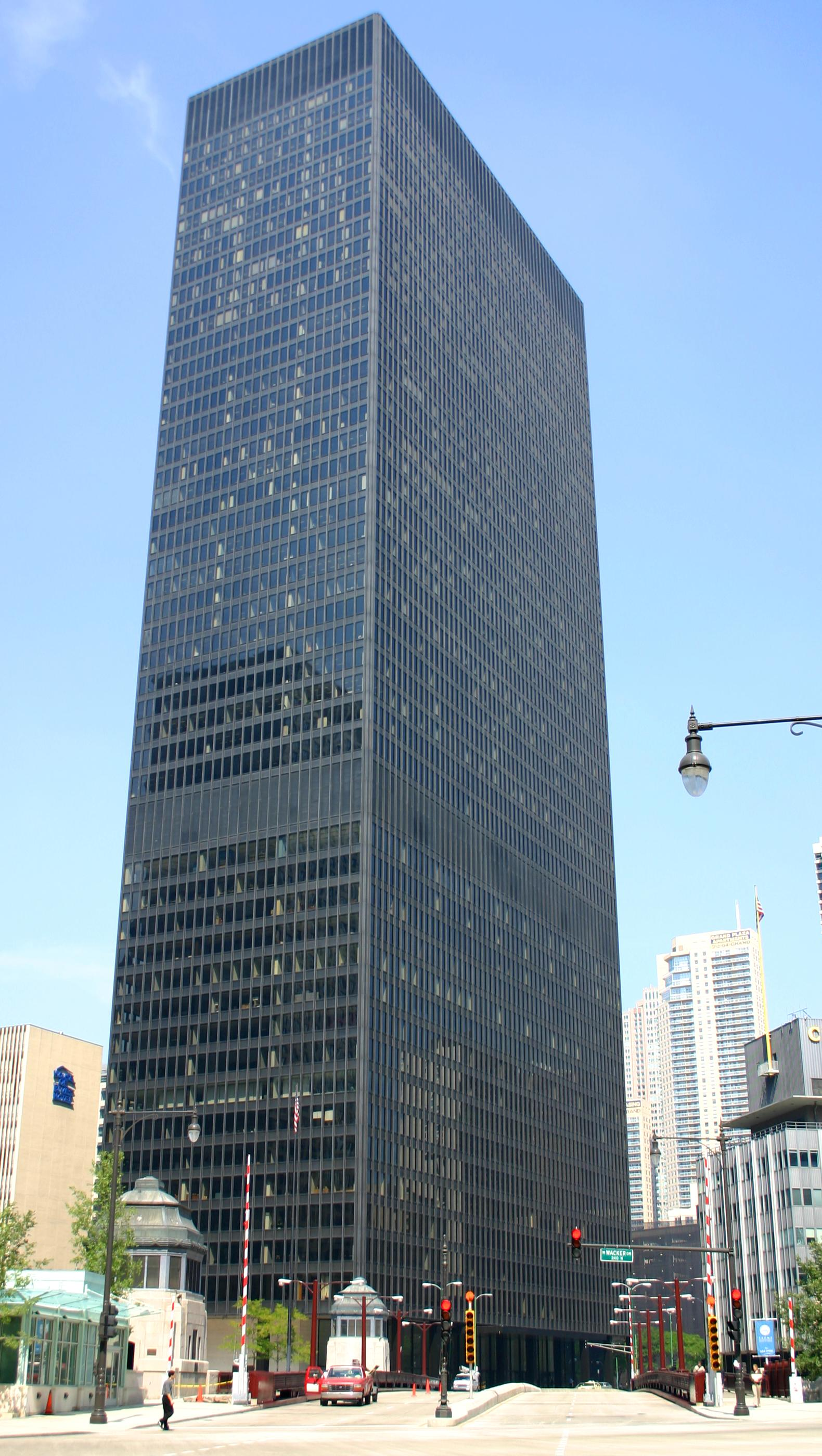
Wolfe prefers ornate stylings, such as in Louis Sullivan's Bayard Building (left), to the unadorned boxes of glass and steel, such as Mies van der Rohe's IBM Plaza.

Wolfe bluntly lays out his thesis in the introduction to From Bauhaus to Our House with a riff on the patriotic song "America the Beautiful"

O beautiful, for spacious skies, for amber waves of grain, has there ever been another place on earth where so many people of wealth and power have paid for and put up with so much architecture they detested as within thy blessed borders today?

Wolfe criticizes the tendencies of modern architecture to avoid any external ornamentation. Wolfe praised architects like Louis Sullivan who, from the late 19th century to his death in 1924, built a number of ornate buildings. Wolfe turned his criticism on the International Style and Modern Architecture exemplified by architects such as Ludwig Mies van der Rohe, Le Corbusier and Walter Gropius (the founder of the Bauhaus school in Germany, whose ideas influenced Modern Architecture, and from which the title of the book derives). Wolfe believed that the buildings of the International Style and Modern Architecture could barely be appreciated by those who had to work in them.

Wolfe's critique, however, was not purely aesthetic. As in The Painted Word Wolfe was critical of what he saw as too much adherence to theory. Wolfe characterized the architecture as based on a political philosophy that was inapplicable to America, arguing, for example, that it was silly to model American schools on "worker's flats" for the proletariat. The architecture world—like an art world dominated by critics, and a literature world dominated by creative writing programs—was producing buildings that nobody liked. Many architects, in Wolfe's opinion, had no particular goal but to be the most avant-garde.

== Critical response ==
As Wolfe's arguments mirrored those he made in The Painted Word so was mirrored the critical response. The response to Wolfe's book from the architecture world was highly negative. Critics argued that, once again, Wolfe was writing on a topic he knew nothing about and had little insight to contribute to the conversation. Time critic Robert Hughes wrote that Wolfe had added nothing to the discussion of modern architecture except "a kind of supercilious rancor and a free-floating hostility toward the intelligentsia". The architectural and urban critic Michael Sorkin noted, "What Tom Wolfe doesn't know about modern architecture could fill a book. And so indeed it has, albeit a slim one."

Hilton Kramer writing in the Saturday Review found Wolfe's writing hyperbolic and refuted some of Wolfe's points. Wolfe had claimed, for example, that a Modern Architecture exhibition at the Museum of Modern Art had played a large role in subverting native culture; Kramer rebutted that the museum had displayed the art of Charles Burchfield and Edward Hopper before Picasso and Matisse and that the exhibition occurred in 1932 while the architecture itself remained uncommon for another 20 years.

Some critics conceded that Wolfe was right that many people did not appreciate the buildings. Blake Morrison, writing in the Times Literary Supplement observed that perhaps some people felt such hostility to architecture because it is "a gallery we can't walk out of, a book we can't close, and art we can't even turn our backs on because it is there facing us on the other side of the street".

Others noted that, regardless of whether Wolfe was right or wrong, architecture was already moving away from Modern architecture to Postmodern architecture. Many of the complaints that Wolfe lodged against Modern architecture, particularly the austere boxiness of the buildings, were no longer a facet of postmodern architecture.

Critics observed that the book was well written. Paul Goldberger, the architecture critic for The New York Times wrote, "Mr. Wolfe's agility continues to dazzle, more than fourteen years after his essays first began to appear in print. But dazzle is not history, or architectural criticism, or even social criticism, and it is certainly not an inquiry into the nature of the relationship between architecture and society."
