= Byron Dobell =

American editor and artist (1927–2017)

- Born: May 30, 1927; Bronx, New York, United States
- Died: January 21, 2017 (aged 89); New York, New York, United States
- Education: Columbia University (BA)
- Occupations: Editor, artist
- Known for: Editing and portrait painting

Byron Dobell (May 30, 1927 – January 21, 2017) was an American editor and artist. He is considered "one of the most respected and accomplished editors in New York magazine publishing history", the editor of several popular American magazines, including American Heritage and Esquire. He is credited with helping the early careers of many writers, including Tom Wolfe, David Halberstam and Mario Puzo. In 1998, Dobell was inducted into the American Society of Magazine Editors Hall of Fame.

Dobell also wrote essays and poems that were published in, among others, The American Scholar, The Nation and The Southampton Review.

== Journalism ==
=== Tom Wolfe ===
In 1963, Tom Wolfe approached Dobell at Esquire to propose an article on the hot rod and custom car culture of Southern California. Wolfe struggled with the article, developing writer's block, and was unable to complete it. Dobell suggested that Wolfe send him his notes so they could piece the story together. Wolfe procrastinated until, on the evening before the article was due, he worked all night typing a letter to Dobell explaining what he wanted to say on the subject, ignoring all journalistic conventions. Dobell's response was to remove the salutation "Dear Byron" from the top of the letter and publish it intact as reportage. The result, published in the November 1963 issue, was "There Goes (Varoom! Varoom!) That Kandy-Kolored Tangerine-Flake Streamline Baby". The article was widely discussed — loved by some, hated by others — and helped Wolfe publish his first book, The Kandy-Kolored Tangerine-Flake Streamline Baby. Wolfe also credited Dobell with the idea of changing Sherman McCoy, the protagonist of Wolfe's novel Bonfire of the Vanities, from a writer to a bond trader.

=== Mario Puzo ===
As the editor of Book World from 1967 to 1969, Dobell published numerous book reviews by Mario Puzo, including the first book review Puzo ever wrote. "I think Byron ... was the only guy who would have printed it and certainly the only guy who would have given it a front page."

== Art career ==
In 1990, Dobell left journalism to fulfil a long-held passion: portrait painting. In the years that followed, Dobell painted many of his friends and colleagues and others on commission, including New York Magazine founder Clay Felker and chief operating officer of Forbes, Tim Forbes.

Dobell's paintings of Ted Kennedy, Betty Friedan, and Clay Felker are in the collection of the Smithsonian's National Portrait Gallery.

He was an artist member of New York's Century Association and was a Visiting Artist at the American Academy in Rome in 2006.

Between 1994 and 2015, Dobell had 11 solo shows in New York City, consisting primarily of landscapes, still lifes and life studies.
