= Me generation =

Term referring to self-involved baby boomers

The "Me" generation is a term referring to the baby boomers, especially the second half, in the United States, and the self-involved qualities associated with this generation. The 1970s was dubbed the "Me decade" by writer Tom Wolfe in The "Me" Decade and the Third Great Awakening; Christopher Lasch wrote about the rise of a culture of narcissism among younger baby boomers. The phrase became popular at a time when "self-realization" and "self-fulfillment" were becoming cultural aspirations to which young people supposedly ascribed higher importance than social responsibility.

== Origins ==
The cultural change in the United States during the 1970s that was experienced by the baby boomers, upon when the second half of the demographic, known as Generation Jones, or simply as Joneses, when they came of age, is complex. The 1960s are remembered as a time of political protests, and radical experimentation with new cultural experiences (the sexual revolution, happenings, mainstream awareness of Eastern religions), which were practiced by older Boomers. The first half of the Post-WW II Generation are sometimes called the Leading Edge Boomers, or simply as the Leading Edges. The civil rights movement gave rebellious young people serious goals. Cultural experimentation was justified as being directed toward spiritual or intellectual enlightenment. The mid-to-late 1970s, in contrast, was a time of increased economic crisis and disillusionment with idealistic politics among the young, particularly after the resignation of Richard Nixon and the end of the Vietnam War. Unapologetic hedonism became acceptable among the young.

The new introspectiveness announced the demise of an established set of traditional faiths centred on work and the postponement of gratification, and the emergence of a consumption-oriented lifestyle ethic centred on lived experience and the immediacy of daily lifestyle choices.

By the mid-1970s, Tom Wolfe and Christopher Lasch were speaking out critically against the culture of narcissism. These criticisms were widely repeated throughout American popular media.

The development of a youth culture focusing so heavily on self-fulfillment was also perhaps a reaction against the traits that characterized the older Silent Generationers, which had grown up during the Great Depression and became of age in the 1950s from when the Civil Rights Movement had begun. That generation had learned values associated with self-sacrifice. The deprivations of the Depression had taught that generation to work hard, frugally save money, and to cherish family and community ties. Loyalty to institutions, traditional religious faiths, and other common bonds were what that generation considered to be the cultural foundations of their country. Generation Xers, upon maturing in the 1990s, gradually abandoned those values in large numbers, a development that was entrenched during the 1970s.

The 1970s have been described as a transitional era when the self-help of the 1960s became self-gratification, and eventually devolved into the selfishness of the 1980s.

== Characteristics ==
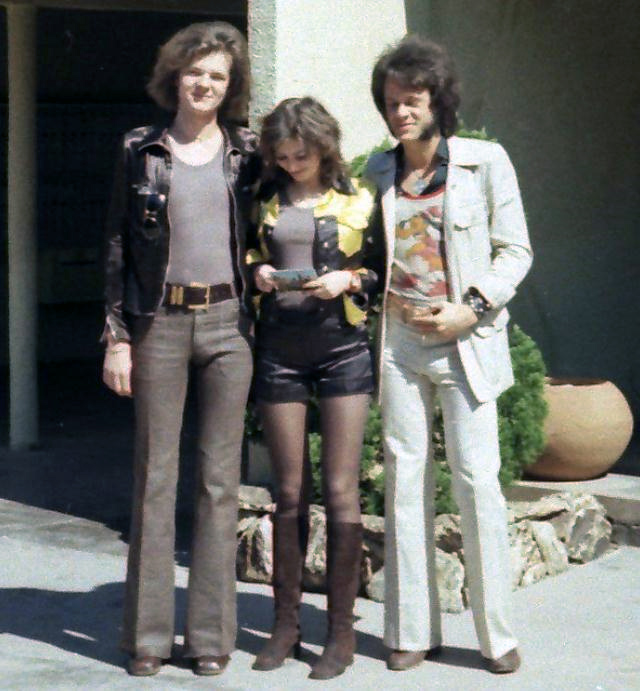
Discos and nightclubbing became popular with Me generation singles during the 1970s.

Health and exercise fads, New Age spirituality such as Scientology, hot tub parties, self-help programs such as EST (Erhard Seminars Training), and the growth of the self-help book industry became identified with the baby boomers during 1970s. Human potential, emotional honesty, "finding yourself", and new therapies became signatures of the culture. The marketing of lifestyle products, eagerly consumed by baby boomers with disposable income during the 1970s, became an inescapable part of the culture. Revlon's marketing staff did research into young women's cultural values during the 1970s, revealing that young women were striving to compete with men in the workplace and to express themselves as independent individuals. Revlon launched the "lifestyle" perfume Charlie, with marketing aimed at glamorizing the values of the new 1970s woman, and it became the world's best-selling perfume.

== In popular culture ==
The introspection of the baby boomers and their focus on self-fulfillment has been examined in a serious light in pop culture. Films such as An Unmarried Woman (1978), Kramer vs. Kramer (1979), Ordinary People (1980) and The Big Chill (1983) brought the inner struggles of baby boomers to a wide audience. The self-absorbed side of 1970s life was given a sharp and sometimes poignant satirization in Manhattan (1979). More acerbic lampooning came in Shampoo (1975) and Private Benjamin (1980). The Me generation has also been satirized in retrospect, as the generation called "baby boomers" reached adulthood, for example, in Parenthood (1989). Forrest Gump (1994), despite the titular protagonist being from the Silent Generation, the Me generation was summed up in the decade with Gump's cross-country jogging quest for meaning during the 1970s. This was complete with a tracksuit, which was worn as much as a fashion statement as an athletic necessity during the era.

The satirization of the Me generation's "me first" attitude was the focus of the television sitcom Seinfeld, which does not include conscious moral development for its Boomer characters, but rather the opposite. Its plots do not have teaching lessons for its audience and its creators explicitly held that it was a "show about nothing".

== Persistence of the label ==
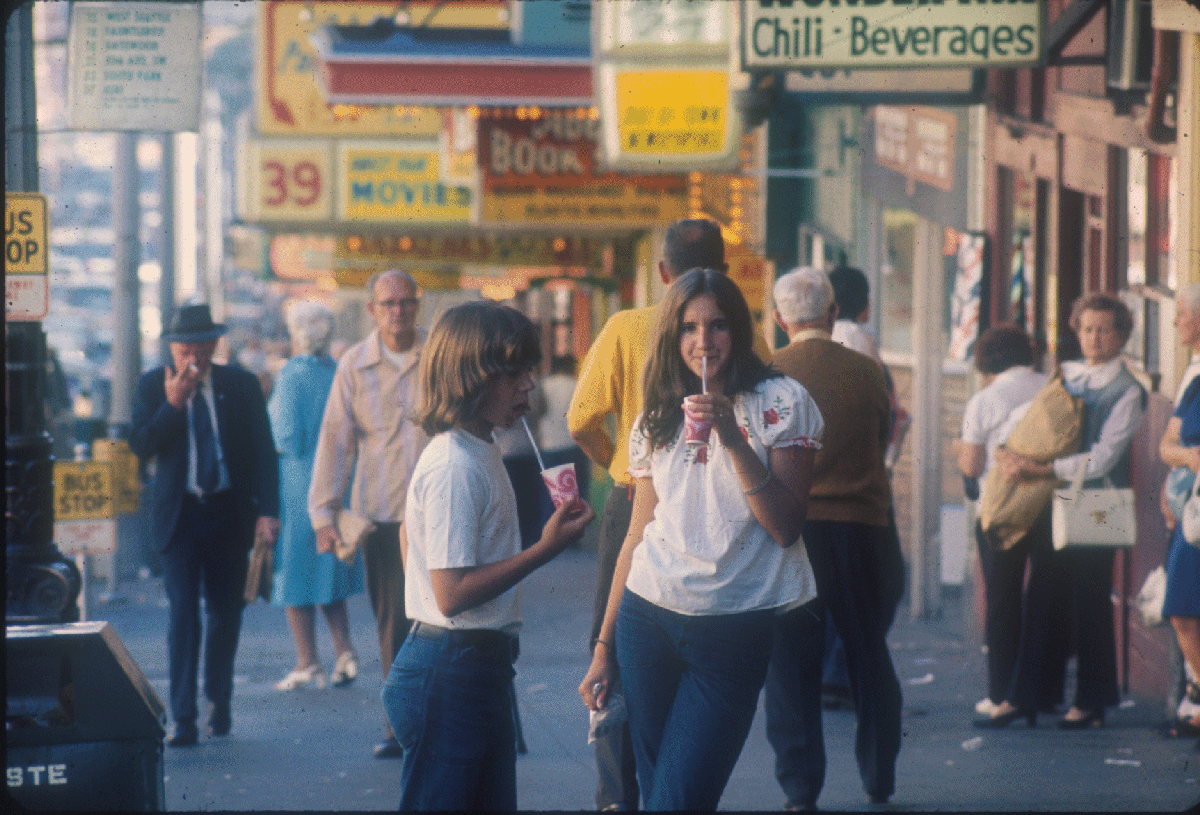
The Me generation mostly embraced entertainment and consumer culture.

The term "Me generation" has persisted over the decades and is connected to baby boomers. The 1970s was also an era of rising unemployment among the young, continuing erosion of faith in conventional social institutions, and political and ideological aimlessness. This was the environment that popularized punk rock among America's disaffected youth. By 1980, when Ronald Reagan was elected president, baby boomers increasingly adopted conservative political and cultural priorities.

== Criticism ==
Analytical philosopher Noam Chomsky wrote:

Where did that come from? What was the evidence that that was a fact? I think the evidence was 0. Teenagers had to be indoctrinated by saying 'You people are only interested in yourselves, you live in a culture of narcissism, you're the me generation'. Now every single teenager knows perfectly well that that's not true of me – but you're targeting people who are at a delicate stage of life, they don't quite know who they are... if they're different they think, 'Maybe there's something wrong with me, maybe I ought to be like everyone else'.

Panos Cosmatos, director of the 2010 film Beyond the Black Rainbow, admits a dislike for baby boomers' New Age spiritual ideals, an issue he addresses in his film. The use of psychedelic drugs for mind-expansion purposes is also explored, although Cosmatos' take on it is "dark and disturbing", a "brand of psychedelia that stands in direct opposition to the flower child, magic mushroom peace trip" wrote a reviewer describing one of the characters who happened to be a Boomer:

I look at Arboria as kind of naïve. He had the best of intentions of wanting to expand human consciousness, but I think his ego got in the way of that and ultimately it turned into a poisonous, destructive thing. Because Arboria is trying to control consciousness and control the mind. There is a moment of truth in the film where the whole thing starts to disintegrate because it stops being about their humanity and becomes about an unattainable goal. That is the "Black Rainbow": trying to achieve some kind of unattainable state that is ultimately, probably destructive.

== See also ==
- Generation Jones
- OK boomer
- The "Me" Decade and the Third Great Awakening
- The Culture of Narcissism
- Snowflake (slang)
- Counterculture of the 1960s
