= Pornoviolence =

Essay by American author Tom Wolfe

"Pornoviolence" is an essay by American author Tom Wolfe. It first appeared under a longer title in the July 1967 issue of Esquire magazine, and was later published in the collection Mauve Gloves & Madmen, Clutter & Vine. The essay introduced the term "pornoviolence" in reference to graphic written or audiovisual depictions of violence, which Wolfe argued were used in newspapers, magazines, and film to stimulate prurient audience interest.

The essay was intended to decry the media's habit of glorifying violence as a way of gratifying their audience, in the same way a pornographic film does using sex. Aside from attacking popular culture, such as the articles of The National Enquirer and its imitators, Wolfe also levels his criticism at more mainstream art, including Truman Capote's controversial non-fiction novel In Cold Blood. He argues that, in the absence of mystery and the unpredictable, Capote's book retains the audience's attention with the promise of disclosing gruesome details about the true crime it discusses, thus degenerating the work to the level of sadistic sensationalism, or, indeed, pornoviolence.

"Pornoviolence" as a term has subsequently been used to disparage excessively violent content in books, horror films, and video games.

== See also ==
- Graphic violence
- Aestheticization of violence
- Media violence research
- "Torture porn", a term coined by critic David Edelstein in 2005 for pornoviolence-saturated horror films
