= Radical Wolfe =

2023 American documentary film

- Directed by: Richard Dewey
- Based on: "How Tom Wolfe Became ... Tom Wolfe" by Michael Lewis
- Produced by: Richard Dewey; Andy Fortenbacher; Chris Laszlo
- Edited by: Brian Gersten
- Music by: Alex Mansour; Luke Schwartz
- Release date: September 15, 2023
- Running time: 76 minutes
- Country: United States
- Language: English

Radical Wolfe is a 2023 American documentary film directed by Richard Dewey.

== Summary ==
The film is about the life and work of the American journalist and writer Tom Wolfe. It is based on the article "How Tom Wolfe Became ... Tom Wolfe" by Michael Lewis, published in Vanity Fair in 2015. Special attention is given to the creation and reception of Wolfe's essay "These Radical Chic Evenings", published in New York magazine in 1970.

== Reception ==
The Los Angeles Times described the film as "always lively" and "a sprightly look at what made the reporter-trained Wolfe into the insider's outsider, how he made the leap to explicating — in supercharged, acrobatic sentences — our fast-changing, roving world of cliques, castes and subgroups". Variety called it "a highly entertaining movie that manages to pack in more or less every important thing you’d want to know about Tom Wolfe".
