= Jack Macpherson =

John Duncan "Jack" Macpherson III (October 20, 1937 - November 16, 2006) was a former mailman and bartender in San Diego, California. According to his Los Angeles Times obituary, he was a local legend who acquired "a permanent niche in the history of Southern California beach culture".

== Early life and introduction to surfing ==
Macpherson was born in San Diego, the oldest of two children of an orthopedic surgeon who was also serving in the United States Navy. His family moved to Hawaii, where Dr. Macpherson was stationed and where as a four-year-old, Jack witnessed the Japanese attack on Pearl Harbor. The family returned to the States on a Dutch freighter, and Jack and his sister, Jill, grew up in La Jolla, California, and later moved to the neighborhood near Windansea Beach, where some of the best surfing conditions on the California coast still prevail due to the reefs below.

One of his sister's boyfriends taught Jack to surf at the age of eleven. After graduating from La Jolla High School (where he also ran track), he met Bob Rakestraw at a local gym. At some point, his father, who had adopted him put him to work on a Scripps oceanography research ship to create a work ethic for him. Part of the crew were Portuguese, they would look at the ocean for boils of fish. Each time they sited a stir in the water they would say in their language, "Meda, Meda. Meda!" When Bob returned from the trip he got together with Jack and over time they would get drunk. For some strange reason (if there is one) Bob would say, "Meda, Meda, Mac Meda!"

In the 1960s Macpherson and Rakestraw brought together their friends, acquaintances, and hangers-on into a loose organization they called the Mac Meda Destruction Company, described as "a beer for demolition crew". The group was featured in Tom Wolfe's 1968 book The Pump House Gang. Wolfe described them as going "Ooooo-eeee-Mee-dah! They chant this chant, Mee-dah, in a real fakey deep voice, and it really bugs people. They don't know what the hell it is. It is the cry of the Mac Meda Destruction Company. The Mac Meda Destruction Company is ... an underground society that started in La Jolla three years ago. Nobody can remember exactly how; they have arguments about it. Anyhow, it is mainly something to bug people with and organize huge beer orgies with." The group also managed to get Wolfe to be recognized in London, England in the mid-1960s at the Indica Gallery by sending them a note which read, 'Put this in your window, and Tom Wolfe will come and see you.'

Soon the Mac Meda Destruction Company became known throughout southern California, primarily through the actions of Rakestraw, described as the wilder half of the pair—Meda was known for his propensity for destruction—he was known to break anything from windows to park benches—and his novel way of entering rooms—through the door and then out of an available window. When they came up with the concept of Mac Meda Destruction, Macpherson stenciled the words "Mac Meda Destruction Company" on tee shirts with red paint and designed a logo depicting a mushroom cloud that appeared on bumper stickers. The fake company even had a fake president—Rakestraw was infatuated with Albert, a gorilla at the San Diego Zoo; Meda would just stare at the gorilla for hours on end. So "Albert Mac Meda" was listed as the president of the Destruction company, and his name appeared in the LaJolla telephone book. When the group's depredations got out of hand and the local police were called, they would come looking for Albert Mac Meda rather than either Macpherson or Rakestraw.

Though the company was fake—described primarily as an attitude rather than as an organization—a group of Macpherson's friends, including San Diego Chargers player Pat Shea, did do demolition of houses for free when Interstate 5 was being built through San Diego. However, the Mac Med a Destruction Company continued on, if only in spirit; at the time of Macpherson's death, his longtime friend Doug Moranville continued producing t-shirts and bumper stickers with the Mac Meda logo at his t-shirt shop ("The Branding Iron") in La Jolla. Stickers have adorned everything from walls to cars to the Galileo spacecraft that was launched in 1990, flew past Earth and the Moon and eventually (1995)went into orbit around the planet Jupiter.

== Later life ==
Despite the flow of beer and other alcoholic beverages, Jack Macpherson was known as a natural athlete; he was a champion cyclist who participated in long-distance races; he was also adept in volleyball, diving, surfing and skiing. Macpherson was employed by the United States Postal Service as a letter carrier, primarily working in the Bird Rock area of La Jolla. He worked until his retirement in 1991, when he became a full-time bartender at the West End pub in North Pacific Beach. He died of liver and kidney failure at the age of 69. He was survived by a son, John Duncan Macpherson IV, two grandsons, and his sister, Mrs. Jill Higgins.
