= A Man in Full =

1998 novel by Tom Wolfe

- First edition
- Author: Tom Wolfe
- Language: English
- Publisher: Farrar, Straus & Giroux
- Publication date: November 12, 1998
- Publication place: United States
- Media type: Print (Hardback)
- Pages: 742 pages
- ISBN: 0-374-27032-5
- OCLC: 39339625
- Dewey Decimal: 813/.54 21
- LC Class: PS3573.O526 M26 1998

A Man in Full is the second novel by Tom Wolfe, published on November 12, 1998, by Farrar, Straus & Giroux. It is set primarily in Atlanta, with a significant portion of the story also taking place in the East Bay region of the San Francisco Bay Area.

== Summary ==
A Man in Full is a satirical novel set in Georgia in the late 20th century. It tells the story of characters, black and white, from Georgia's various social and economic classes. These include Charles "Cap'm Charlie" Croker, a real estate mogul and member of Atlanta's high society who is suddenly facing bankruptcy; Martha Croker, his first wife, trying to maintain her social standing without her husband; Ray Peepgass, who is trying illegally to capitalize on Croker's fall; Roger "Too White" White II, a prominent black lawyer; and Conrad Hensley, a young man in prison who discovers the philosophy of Stoicism via Epictetus.

The novel begins with the characters learning of the rumored rape of a young white heiress by a black superstar athlete, Fareek "The Cannon" Fanon. Though the incident is unimportant to the lives of the characters, the potential for the rumor to incite race riots in metropolitan Atlanta has a profound effect on all of their lives. Local politics and business interests become involved, including the president of the bank to which Croker is indebted, Roger Too White's former fraternity brother (now mayor of Atlanta), and the entirety of "respectable" Atlanta society.

A Man in Full is written much in the style of Wolfe's other fictions, such as The Bonfire of the Vanities and I Am Charlotte Simmons.

== Reactions ==
Released eleven years after Wolfe's best-selling novel The Bonfire of the Vanities, A Man in Full was widely anticipated; Wolfe was known to be working on the research for this follow-up effort for several years.

Most of the mainstream American newspapers and news magazines gave the book positive reviews. However, a second wave of reviews in more highbrow literary outlets were more critical. Some of this more pointed criticism, mixed with praise for Wolfe's style, came from established American novelists, including John Updike and Norman Mailer. In addition, novelist John Irving criticized Wolfe's novel during an interview on a Canadian television program. Wolfe countered this criticism in his book Hooking Up, calling the three authors his "three stooges" who were actually shaken by the support he received. The novelists, he claimed, were threatened by the success of his technique – writing a novel based on reporting techniques – and were failing to engage the world around them. According to Mailer's review, the book had sold over 750,000 copies by December 1998.

The book was credited with allusions to, or the caricaturing of, some prominent members of contemporary Atlanta society.

== Other media ==
The abridged audiobook of A Man in Full was narrated by American actor David Ogden Stiers. The unabridged audiobook of A Man in Full was released in 2018 and was narrated by American actor Michael Prichard.

== Adaptation ==
In November 2021, Netflix ordered a six-episode limited television series adaptation of the novel with Regina King as director and executive producer and David E. Kelley as showrunner. The miniseries, which deviated substantially from Wolfe's novel, was released on May 2, 2024 to mixed reviews.

== See also ==
- Epictetus § Literature
