= Fiction-absolute =

Concept in anthropology

- Coiner: Tom Wolfe
- Coined in: 2006

The concept of fiction-absolute exists within the contexts of anthropology, and the study of group psychology and tribalism.

The term was coined and defined by journalist Tom Wolfe in his 2006 Jefferson Lecture for the National Endowment for the Humanities. Wolfe defined it as the irrational propaganda an individual, tribe or social group employs to explain why the individual is better than others, or why the tribe or group is the best of all groups and its people the best people. The term itself indicates that it is absolutist in that it defines in stark terms why an individual is superior, or why members should prefer a tribe, and necessarily fictional because it is propaganda (although it may have some basis in truth). The fiction-absolute is essentially a tribe's core propaganda, and can lead to intolerance and forms of collective action.

The fiction-absolute not only necessitates a harsh view of other groups, but also of unaffiliated people and individualists.
