= The Painted Word =

1975 book of art criticism by Tom Wolfe

- First edition
- Author: Tom Wolfe
- Language: English
- Genre: Art criticism
- Publisher: Farrar, Straus & Giroux
- Publication date: 1975
- Publication place: United States
- Media type: Print
- Pages: 153
- ISBN: 0-553-27379-5
- OCLC: 39164533

The Painted Word is a 1975 book of art criticism by Tom Wolfe.

== Background ==
By the 1970s Wolfe was, according to Douglas Davis of Newsweek magazine "more of a celebrity than the celebrities he describes." The success of Wolfe's previous books, in particular The Electric Kool-Aid Acid Test in 1968 and Radical Chic & Mau-Mauing the Flak Catchers in 1970, had given Wolfe carte blanche from his publisher to pursue any topic he desired. In the midst of working on stories about the space program for Rolling Stone—stories that would eventually grow into the 1979 book The Right Stuff—Wolfe became interested in writing a book about modern art. As a journalist, Wolfe had devoted much of his writing career to pursuing realism; Wolfe read in Hilton Kramer's 1974 Times review of Seven Realists, that "to lack a persuasive theory is to lack something crucial". Wolfe summarized the review saying that it meant "without a theory to go with it, I can't see a painting".

Prior to publication in book form, The Painted Word was excerpted in Harper's Magazine. Wolfe's longtime publisher Farrar, Straus & Giroux released it as a book in 1975.

== Themes ==
Wolfe's thesis in The Painted Word was that by the 1970s, modern art had moved away from being a visual experience, and more often was an illustration of art critics' theories. Wolfe criticized avant-garde art, Andy Warhol, Willem de Kooning, and Jackson Pollock. The main target of Wolfe's book, however, was not so much the artists, as the critics. In particular, Wolfe criticized three prominent art critics whom he dubbed the kings of "Cultureburg": Clement Greenberg, Harold Rosenberg, and Leo Steinberg. Wolfe argued that these three men were dominating the world of art with their theories and that, unlike the world of literature in which anyone can buy a book, the art world was controlled by an insular circle of rich collectors, museums, and critics with outsized influence.

Wolfe provided his own history of what he saw as the devolution of modern art. He summarized that history: "In the beginning we got rid of nineteenth-century storybook realism. Then we got rid of representational objects. Then we got rid of the third dimension altogether and got really flat (Abstract Expressionism). Then we got rid of airiness, brushstrokes, most of the paint, and the last viruses of drawing and complicated designs". After providing examples of other techniques and the schools that abandoned them, Wolfe concluded with Conceptual Art: "…there, at last, it was! No more realism, no more representation objects, no more lines, colors, forms, and contours, no more pigments, no more brushstrokes. …Art made its final flight, climbed higher and higher in an ever-decreasing tighter-turning spiral until… it disappeared up its own fundamental aperture… and came out the other side as Art Theory!… Art Theory pure and simple, words on a page, literature undefiled by vision… late twentieth-century Modern Art was about to fulfill its destiny, which was: to become nothing less than Literature pure and simple".

== Critical reception ==
"The Painted Word hit the art world like a really bad, MSG-headache-producing, Chinese lunch," wrote Rosalind E. Krauss in Partisan Review. By ridiculing the most respected members of the art world establishment, Wolfe had ensured that the reaction to his book would be negative. Many reviewers dismissed Wolfe as someone simply too ignorant of art to write about it.

Other critics responded with such similar vitriol and hostility that Wolfe said their response demonstrated that the art community only talked to each other. A review in The New Republic called Wolfe a fascist and compared him to the brainwashed assassin in the film The Manchurian Candidate. Wolfe was particularly amused, however, by a series of criticisms that resorted to "X-rated insults." An artist compared him to "A six-year-old at a pornographic movie; he can follow the action of the bodies but he can't comprehend the nuances." A critic in Time Magazine used the same image, but with an 11-year-old boy. A review in The New York Times Book Review used the image again, clarifying that the boy was a eunuch. The opening of Krauss's review in Partisan Review compared Wolfe to the star of the pornographic film Deep Throat. The reviewer viewed Wolfe's lack of a suggestion for what should replace modern art as similar in its obtuseness to statements Linda Lovelace made about Deep Throat being a "kind of goof."

In defense of critics Rosenberg, Greenberg, and Steinberg, Rosalind Krauss noted that each man wrote about art "in ways that are entirely diverse." Writing in Newsweek, Douglas Davis wrote that The Painted Word fails because of how it departed from Wolfe's previous works. Wolfe's other non-fiction, Davis wrote, was deeply reported, but here "Wolfe did not get away from the typewriter and out into the thick of his subject."

Outside the art community, some reviewers noted that however unpopular Wolfe's book may have been in art circles, many of his observations were essentially correct, particularly about the de-objectification of art and the rise of art theory.
