= The "Me" Decade and the Third Great Awakening =

1976 essay on American culture by Tom Wolfe

- Cover of August 23, 1976, issue of New York magazine in which the essay first appeared
- Author: Tom Wolfe
- Language: English
- Published: 23 August 1976
- Publication place: United States

"The 'Me' Decade and the Third Great Awakening" is an essay by American author Tom Wolfe, in which Wolfe coined the phrase "'Me' Decade", a term that became common as a descriptor for the 1970s. The essay was first published as the cover story in the August 23, 1976, issue of New York magazine and later appeared in his collection Mauve Gloves & Madmen, Clutter & Vine.

In one of the essay's most famous passages, exemplifying his style of description, Wolfe called Jimmy Carter a "Missionary lectern-pounding Amen ten-finger C-major-chord Sister-Martha-at-the-Yamaha-keyboard loblolly piney-woods Baptist."

== Origin of the term "'Me' Decade" ==
...The old alchemical dream was changing base metals into gold. The new alchemical dream is: changing one's personality – remaking, remodeling, elevating, and polishing one's very self... and observing, studying, and doting on it. (Me!)...

— Tom Wolfe, The "Me" Decade

The term "'Me' Decade" describes a general new attitude of Americans in the 1970s, in the direction of atomized individualism and away from communitarianism, in clear contrast with social values prevalent in the United States during the 1960s.

Wolfe asserts the disappearance of the socioeconomic class he calls the "proletariat", in parallel with the concurrent appearance of an American "lower middle class". He cites the economic boom of postwar America as affording the average American a new sense of self-determination and individuation associated with the widespread economic prosperity. Wolfe describes the resulting abandoning of communal, progressive, and New Deal-style politics as "taking the money and running". He traces the preoccupation with self and self-development back to the aristocratic European gentry. Wolfe states that the "chivalric tradition" and the philosophy behind "the finishing school" are inherently dedicated to the building and forming of personal character and conduct.

Wolfe believes that the counterculture of the 1960s and the New Left school of thought promoted a recovery of the self in a flawed and corrupt America, a philosophy extended in the 1970s with a spreading idea that use of the drug LSD, commonly known as "acid", would unveil a true and real self. He describes the revelatory experience of hallucinogens as similar to, even competitive with, religious ecstasy, transforming the religious climate in America. Wolfe chronicles the American periods of Christian revival known as the First and Second Great Awakenings, to which he analogizes the 1970s and their dominant social trends. He argues that the "Me" Decade of the 1970s is a "Third Great Awakening".

== Criticism ==
In his influential 1979 book The Culture of Narcissism, cultural historian Christopher Lasch states that Wolfe "inadvertently provides evidence that undermines a religious interpretation of the 'consciousness movement'" and quotes Wolfe as saying "most people, historically, have not lived their lives as if thinking 'I have only one life to live'. Instead they lived as if they were living their ancestors' and their offspring's lives".

== See also ==
- Counterculture of the 1960s
- Great Awakening
- Mauve Gloves & Madmen, Clutter & Vine
- Me generation
- Self-help
