= Mauve Gloves & Madmen, Clutter & Vine =

- First edition
- Author: Tom Wolfe
- Illustrator: Tom Wolfe
- Language: English
- Genre: New Journalism
- Published: 1976; Farrar, Straus and Giroux
- Publication place: United States
- Media type: Print (hardback & paperback)
- Pages: 243
- ISBN: 0-374-20424-1
- OCLC: 2463579
- Dewey Decimal: 813/.5/2
- LC Class: PS3573.O526 M3

Mauve Gloves & Madmen, Clutter & Vine is a 1976 book by Tom Wolfe, consisting of eleven essays and one short story that Wolfe wrote between 1967 and 1976. It includes the essay in which he coined the term "the 'Me' Decade" to refer to the 1970s. In addition to the written pieces, Wolfe illustrated the book.

== Publication ==
Mauve Gloves & Madmen, Clutter & Vine was Wolfe's third collection of essays and short stories, following The Kandy-Kolored Tangerine-Flake Streamline Baby in 1965 and The Pump House Gang in 1968. Wolfe's 1970 book Radical Chic & Mau-Mauing the Flak Catchers contained two lengthy essays and is not generally considered a collection. Mauve Gloves & Madmen, Clutter & Vine was published in 1976 by Wolfe's regular publisher Farrar, Straus & Giroux.

== Themes ==
The subjects of Wolfe's essays were considered less original than his previous efforts. When Wolfe wrote about the culture of surf gangs in The Pump House Gang or about stock car racing in The Kandy-Kolored Tangerine-Flake Streamline Baby it was untrod ground. In Mauve Gloves, Wolfe wrote about subjects that had been widely covered before and sought to bring his unique insight to old stories, rather than tell wholly original stories about unexplored subcultures.

The primary theme of Wolfe's essays is the struggle for social status. Wolfe is particularly critical of the intelligentsia and the liberal elite, themes that he had previously explored in Radical Chic & Mau-Mauing the Flak Catchers. His contempt for distinguished writers (which would later be manifested in a feud with many of his contemporaries, particularly John Updike) was evident in an essay about an established West Side author discussing his cash flow at length. Wolfe continued to denounce what he saw as faux-sympathy for poor people coming from a rich liberal elite.

Wolfe terms the status-driven era he chronicled the "'Me' Decade", and suggests that the wealth of the Post-War era is responsible for the self-absorption of the 1970s. Wolfe declared that people had given up on "man's age-old belief in serial immortality", the notion that people lived on through ancestral tradition and self-sacrifice, and instead focused only on themselves.

The longest essay, however, is "The Truest Sport: Jousting with Sam and Charlie," about life aboard an aircraft carrier in the Gulf of Tonkin in 1967. Wolfe writes about the personnel of the aircraft in heroic terms. According to The New York Review of Books, another common theme throughout all the books is the effect the Vietnam War had on American society.

The lone short story in the book, "The Commercial" is an essay of a black baseball player who is given an advertising deal. Initially, the athlete believes the commercial will help establish him as more than a black athlete, but instead the advertisers want him to mispronounce words, thus dehumanizing him despite his success.

== Writing ==
Often referred to as New Journalism, Wolfe's characteristic writing style, characterized by florid prose and obsessive attention to detail, are on display throughout the book.

Wolfe compared himself to British author Evelyn Waugh, who was known for his dark comedy. The New York Times however, suggested that Wolfe's latest effort most closely resembled the French author Louis-Ferdinand Céline, who in the early 20th century, wrote in a highly colloquial style, and delved deeply into the anxieties of his characters. Because Wolfe's subjects in Mauve Gloves were not people on the fringes of society, the New York Times critic argued that Wolfe had begun to rely more heavily on "writing qua writing," and less on the inherent zaniness of his subjects.

In one of the book's most famous passages in the essay "The 'Me' Decade and the Third Great Awakening", exemplifying his style of description, Wolfe called Jimmy Carter a "Missionary lectern-pounding Amen ten-finger C-major-chord Sister-Martha-at-the-Yamaha-keyboard loblolly piney-woods Baptist."

== Contents ==
The 12 pieces in the book are divided into four sections as follows:

"Stories and Sketches"

1. "Mauve Gloves & Madmen, Clutter & Vine"
2. "The Man Who Always Peaked Too Soon"
3. "The Truest Sport: Jousting with Sam and Charlie"
4. "The Commercial: A Short Story"

"The Spirit of the Age (and what it longs for)"

5. "The Intelligent Coed's Guide to America"
6. "The 'Me' Decade and the Third Great Awakening"

"Sex and Violence"

7. "The Perfect Crime"
8. "Pornoviolence"
9. "The Boiler Room and the Computer"

"Manners, Decor, and Decorum"

10. "Funky Chic"
11. "Honks and Wonks"
12. "The Street Fighters"
