= Hooking Up =

2000 collection of essays by Tom Wolfe

- First edition
- Author: Tom Wolfe
- Language: English
- Genre: New Journalism
- Publisher: Farrar, Straus and Giroux
- Publication date: 2000
- Publication place: United States
- Media type: Print (hardback & paperback)
- Pages: 293
- ISBN: 0-374-10382-8
- Dewey Decimal: 813.54
- LC Class: PS3573.O526 H66 2000

Hooking Up is a collection of essays and a novella by American author Tom Wolfe, a number of which were earlier published in popular magazines.

The essays cover diverse topics dating from as early as 1965, including both non-fiction and fiction, along with snipes at his contemporaries John Updike, Norman Mailer and John Irving.

== Contents ==
=== Hooking Up ===
- Hooking Up: What Life was Like at the Turn of the Second Millennium: An American's World – contemporary teenage promiscuity.

=== The Human Beast ===
- Two Young Men Who Went West – profiles of Robert Noyce and William Shockley; especially comparing Noyce, founder of Intel and a graduate of Grinnell College, with Josiah Grinnell, its founder.
- Digibabble, Fairy Dust, and the Human Anthill
- Sorry, But Your Soul Just Died - essay by Tom Wolfe (Forbes, 1996) contains profile of E. O. Wilson.

=== Vita Robusta, Ars Anorexica ===
- In the Land of the Rococo Marxists
- The Invisible Artist
- The Great Relearning
- My Three Stooges –Wolfe's castigation of Mailer, Updike, and Irving

=== Ambush at Fort Bragg: A Novella ===
- Ambush at Fort Bragg – a fictional investigative television program delves into military harassment of gay people.

=== The New Yorker Affair ===
- Foreword: Murderous Gutter Journalism
- Tiny Mummies! The True Story of the Ruler of 43rd Street's Land of the Walking Dead! – 1965 profile of The New Yorker editor William Shawn
- Lost in the Whichy Thickets
- Afterword: High in the Saddle

== Publication data ==
- Tom Wolfe, Hooking Up (2000), Farrar, Straus and Giroux, hardcover: ISBN 0-374-10382-8
  - 2001 Picador trade paperback: ISBN 0-312-42023-4
  - 2001 Picador mass market paperback: ISBN 0-330-48611-X
