= The Right Stuff (book) =

1979 nonfiction book by Tom Wolfe

- First edition
- Author: Tom Wolfe
- Language: English
- Genre: New Journalism; Non-fiction
- Publisher: Farrar, Straus and Giroux
- Publication date: September 1979
- Publication place: United States
- Media type: Print (hardcover & paperback)
- Pages: 436 pages
- ISBN: 0-374-25032-4
- OCLC: 5007334
- Dewey Decimal: 629.4/0973 19
- LC Class: TL789.8.U5 W64 1979

The Right Stuff is a 1979 book by Tom Wolfe about the pilots engaged in U.S. postwar research with experimental rocket-powered, high-speed aircraft as well as documenting the stories of the first astronauts selected for the NASA's Project Mercury program. The Right Stuff is based on extensive research by Wolfe, who interviewed test pilots, the astronauts (Note: According to Alan Shepard, Tom Wolfe never spoke with any of the original seven astronauts (Alan Shepard's Interview to Charlie Rose, July 20, 1994).) and their wives, among others. The story contrasts the Mercury Seven and their families with other test pilots such as Chuck Yeager, who was never selected as an astronaut.

Wolfe wrote that the book was inspired by the desire to find out why the astronauts accepted the danger of space flight. He recounts the enormous risks that test pilots were already taking, and the mental and physical characteristics—the titular "right stuff"—required for and reinforced by their jobs. Wolfe likens the astronauts to "single combat warriors" from an earlier era who received the honor and adoration of their people before going forth to fight on their behalf.

The book was adapted into a film of the same name in 1983 and a television series, also of the same name, by National Geographic as a Disney+ Original in October 2020.

== Writing and publication ==
First-state dust jacket, showing initial design never released in a public edition

In 1972 Jann Wenner, the editor of Rolling Stone, assigned Wolfe to cover the launch of NASA's last Moon mission, Apollo 17. Wolfe became fascinated with the astronauts, and his competitive spirit compelled him to try to outdo Norman Mailer's nonfiction book about the first Moon mission, Of a Fire on the Moon. He published a four-part series for Rolling Stone in 1973 titled "Post-Orbital Remorse", about the depression that some astronauts experienced after having been in space. After the series, Wolfe began researching the whole of the space program, in what became a seven-year project from which he took time to write The Painted Word, a book on art, and to complete Mauve Gloves & Madmen, Clutter & Vine, a collection of shorter pieces.

In 1977 he returned to his astronaut book full-time. Wolfe originally planned to write a complete history of the space program, though after writing through the Mercury program, he felt that his work was complete and that it captured the astronauts' ethos—the "right stuff" that astronauts and test pilots of the 1940s and 1950s shared—the unspoken code of bravery and machismo that compelled these men to ride on top of dangerous rockets. While conducting research, he consulted with Yeager and, after receiving a comprehensive review of his manuscript, was convinced that test pilots like Yeager should form the backdrop of the period. In the end, Yeager becomes a personification of the many postwar test pilots and their "right stuff". The phrase itself may have originated in the 1898 Joseph Conrad story "Youth", where it was used.

Wolfe also consulted with Dr. David Hamburg, then head of the department of psychiatry at Stanford, to learn about the psychological aspects of space flight, and relate the experience from the pilot/astronauts' point of view.

The Right Stuff was published in 1979 by Farrar, Straus and Giroux and became Wolfe's best selling book yet. It was praised by most critics, was a finalist for the National Book Critics Circle Award, and won the National Book Award for Nonfiction.

In the foreword to a new edition, published in 1983 when the film adaptation was released, Wolfe wrote that his "book grew out of some ordinary curiosity" about what "makes a man willing to sit up on top of an enormous Roman candle... and wait for someone to light the fuse".

== Book ==
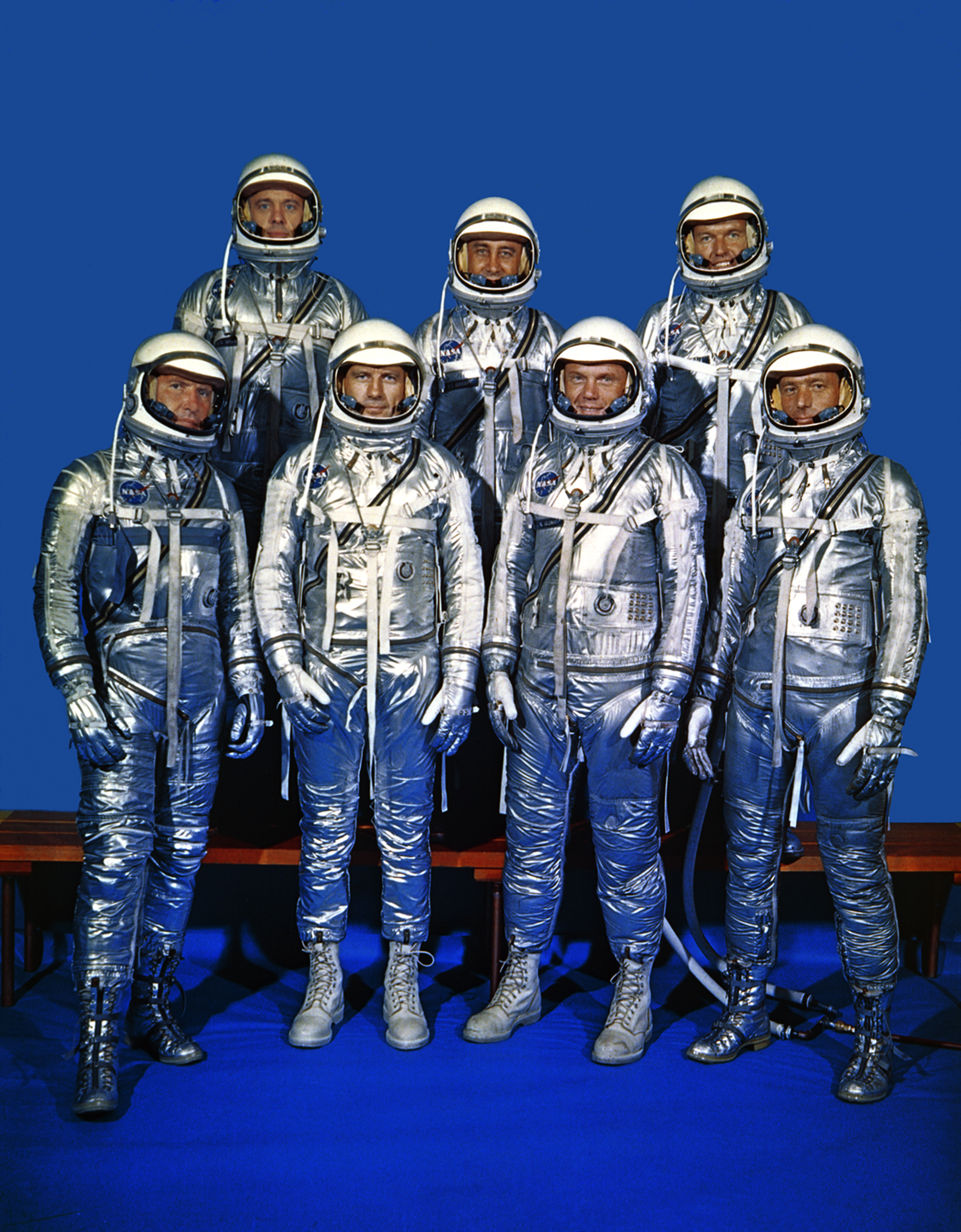
The Mercury Seven: (left to right, back row) Alan Shepard, Virgil "Gus" Grissom and L. Gordon Cooper; (front row) Walter Schirra, Donald "Deke" Slayton, John Glenn and Scott Carpenter

The story is more about the space race than space exploration in general. The Soviet Union's early space efforts are mentioned only as background, focusing entirely on an early portion of the U.S. space program. Only Project Mercury, the first operational crewed space-flight program, is covered. The Mercury Seven were Scott Carpenter, Gordon Cooper, John Glenn, Gus Grissom, Wally Schirra, Alan Shepard, and Deke Slayton. Emphasis is given to the personal stories of the astronauts and their wives rather than the technical aspects of space travel and the flights themselves.

The storyline also involves the political reasons for putting people into space, asserting that the Mercury astronauts were actually a burden to the program and were only sent up for promotional reasons. Reasons for including living beings in spacecraft are barely touched upon, but the first option considered was to use a chimpanzee (and, indeed, chimpanzees were sent up first).

Another option considered was using athletes already accustomed to physical stress, such as circus trapeze artists. Wolfe states that President Dwight D. Eisenhower insisted on pilots, even though the first crew members would not actually fly the spacecraft. When Gus Grissom lands at sea and exits his space capsule, saving the capsule seems more important to the recovery team than saving the pilot because of the value of the data.

Wolfe contrasts the Seven with the Edwards AFB test pilots, among whom was Chuck Yeager, who was shut out of the astronaut program after NASA officials decided to use college-degreed pilots, not ones who gained their commissions as enlisted men, such as participants in the USAAF Flying Sergeants Program in World War II. Yeager spent time with Wolfe explaining accident reports "that Wolfe kept getting all wrong". Publishing insiders say these sessions between Wolfe and Yeager led Wolfe to highlight Yeager's character, presence, thoughts, and anecdotes throughout the book. As an example, Yeager prides his speech to the Society of Test Pilots that the first rider in the Mercury development program would be a monkey, not a real test pilot, and Wolfe plays this drama out on the angst felt by the Mercury astronauts over those remarks. Yeager himself downplayed the theory of "the right stuff", attributing his survival of potential catastrophes to simply knowing his airplane thoroughly, along with some good luck.

Another test pilot highlighted in the book is Scott Crossfield. Crossfield and Yeager were fierce but friendly rivals for speed and altitude records.

== In other media ==
=== Film ===
A 3-hour, 13-minute film released in 1983 stars Sam Shepard, Scott Glenn, Ed Harris, Dennis Quaid, Fred Ward, Barbara Hershey, Kim Stanley, Levon Helm, Veronica Cartwright, Pamela Reed, Lance Henriksen, and the real Chuck Yeager in a cameo appearance. NFL Hall of Famer Anthony Muñoz also has a small role, playing "Gonzalez". It features a score by composer Bill Conti.

The screenplay was adapted by director Philip Kaufman from the book. Screenwriter William Goldman, who had been attached to the film prior to the hiring of Kaufman, left the project after quarreling with Kaufman about story elements, including Goldman's excision of the Yeager narrative and the unabashedly jingoistic tone of his adaptation (spurred by the Iran hostage crisis).

While the movie took liberties with certain historical facts as part of "dramatic license", criticism focused on one: the portrayal of Gus Grissom panicking when his Liberty Bell 7 spacecraft sank following splashdown. Most historians, as well as engineers working for or with NASA and many of the related contractor agencies within the aerospace industry, are now convinced that the premature detonation of the spacecraft hatch's explosive bolts was caused by failure not associated with direct human error or deliberate detonation at the hands of Grissom.

This determination had, in fact, been made long before the movie was filmed, and even Tom Wolfe's book only states that this possibility was considered, not that it was actually judged as being the cause of the accident. In fact, Grissom was assigned to command the first flights of both Gemini and Apollo. Grissom died in the Apollo 1 fire because there was no quick-opening hatch on the Block 1 Apollo Command Module—a design choice made because NASA had determined that the explosion in the hatch on Grissom's Liberty Bell 7 had been most likely self-initiated.

Another fact that had been altered in the film was the statement by Trudy Cooper, who commented that she "wondered how they would've felt if every time their husband went in to make a deal, there was a one-in-four chance he wouldn't come out of that meeting". According to the book, this actually reflected the 23% chance of dying during a 20-year career as a normal pilot. For a test pilot, these odds were higher, at 53%, but were still considerably less than the movie implied. In addition, the movie merely used the fictional Mrs. Cooper as a vehicle for the statement; the real Mrs. Cooper is not known to have said this.

Wolfe made no secret that he disliked the film, especially because of changes from his original book. Goldman also disliked the choices made by Kaufman, saying in his 1983 book Adventures in the Screen Trade that "Phil [Kaufman]'s heart was with Yeager. And not only that, he felt the astronauts, rather than being heroic, were really minor leaguers, mechanical men of no particular quality, not great pilots at all, simply the product of hype."

Critics were generally favorable toward the film.

=== Television ===
A television series, based on The Right Stuff and created by National Geographic, premiered October 9, 2020, on Disney+ as a Disney+ Original.

== See also ==
- Of a Fire on the Moon (1970) by Norman Mailer, an account of the Apollo 11 Moon landing that inspired Wolfe to write The Right Stuff
- Lost Moon (1994) by Jim Lovell, about the Apollo 13 mission
