= The Pump House Gang =

1968 collection of essays by Tom Wolfe

- First edition
- Author: Tom Wolfe
- Language: English
- Genre: Essays, journalism
- Publisher: Farrar, Straus and Giroux
- Publication date: August 1968
- Publication place: United States
- Media type: Print (hardcover and paperback)
- Pages: 320
- ISBN: 0374238642

The Pump House Gang is a 1968 collection of essays and articles by Tom Wolfe. The pieces in the book explore various aspects of the counterculture of the 1960s. The title essay is based on a two-part New York Herald Tribune Sunday Magazine article titled The New Life Out There, about Jack Macpherson and his social circle of surfers that congregated at a sewage pump house at Windansea Beach in La Jolla, California.

== Publication ==
The Pump House Gang was published on the same day in 1968 as The Electric Kool-Aid Acid Test, Wolfe's story about the LSD-fueled adventures of Ken Kesey and the Merry Pranksters. They were Wolfe's first books since The Kandy-Kolored Tangerine-Flake Streamline Baby in 1965 which, like The Pump House Gang, was a collection of Wolfe's essays. Wolfe originally planned for The Electric Kool-Aid Acid Test to be an essay to include in The Pump-House Gang but as the piece kept getting longer, it was published as a standalone book instead.

Although both books were well received and would go on to become best-sellers, The Electric Kool-Aid Acid Test was hailed as an instant classic and would become the better-known of the two books. In his book Hothouse, which documents the history of Wolfe's publisher Farrar, Straus and Giroux (FSG), journalist Boris Kachka said that "[FSG] put more energy and more advertising behind Acid Test, perhaps cannibalizing sales of Pump House Gang.

== Writing ==
All but two of the pieces in the book were written in 1965 and 1966, during the ten months after the publication of The Kandy-Kolored Tangerine-Flake Streamline Baby. During this period, Wolfe spent extensive time with many of his subjects, including Hugh Hefner, the founder of Playboy magazine (whom Wolfe famously compared to The Great Gatsby); Carol Doda, a stripper who helped popularize breast implants; and the surfers of the pump house.

Other subjects Wolfe profiles in the book include actress Natalie Wood, the New York Hilton, then-Mod teenager Joan Juliet Buck, the visionary media-theorist Marshall McLuhan and various socialites of New York. The essays collectively tell the story of the new status symbols and lifestyles of the 1960s and how the culture was changing from the traditional social hierarchies of the time. The success of the book cemented Wolfe as one of his generation's most prominent social critics.

== Style ==
The pieces in The Pump House Gang are written in the style of New Journalism that Wolfe and other writers like Joan Didion and Gay Talese helped to popularize. According to Time magazine's review of Wolfe's book:

He uses a language that explodes with comic-book words like "POW!" and "boing." His sentences are shot with ellipses, stabbed with exclamation points, or bombarded with long lists of brand names and anatomical terms. He is irritating, but he did develop a new journalistic idiom that has brought relief from standard Middle-High Journalese.

Wolfe's style was simultaneously mocked and widely imitated. In 1990, the Los Angeles Times interviewed many of the surfers who had been involved with the pump house gang. Some of the surfers claimed that Wolfe took liberties with the facts to embellish and mythologize the lifestyle of the surfers. Other members of the pump house gang believed Wolfe's characterizations were correct.

== Contents ==
The Pump House Gang contains fifteen essays:

1. "The Pump House Gang"
2. "The Mid-Atlantic Man"
3. "King of the Status Dropouts"
4. "The Put-Together Girl"
5. "The Noonday Underground"
6. "The Shockkkkkk of Recognition"
7. "The Hair Boys"
8. "What if He Is Right?"
9. "Bob and Spike"
10. "Tom Wolfe's New Book of Etiquette"
11. "The Life & Hard Times of a Teenage London Society Girl"
12. "The Private Game"
13. "The Automated Hotel"
14. "The Mild Ones"
15. "O Rotten Gotham—Sliding Down into the Behavioral Sink"
