= The Kandy-Kolored Tangerine-Flake Streamline Baby =

1965 essay collection by Tom Wolfe

- First edition
- Author: Tom Wolfe
- Language: English
- Publisher: Farrar, Straus and Giroux
- Publication place: United States
- ISBN: 978-0-317-59297-9
- OCLC: 420554
- Dewey Decimal: 309.173
- LC Class: E169.1 .W685

The Kandy-Kolored Tangerine-Flake Streamline Baby is the title of Tom Wolfe's first collected book of essays, published in 1965. The book is named for one of the stories in the collection that was originally published in Esquire in 1963 under the title "There Goes (Varoom! Varoom!) That Kandy-Kolored (Thphhhhhh!) Tangerine-Flake Streamline Baby (Rahghhh!) Around the Bend (Brummmmmmmmmmmmmmm)…" Wolfe's essay for Esquire and this, his first book, are frequently hailed as early examples of New Journalism.

== Essays ==
In the introduction to the book, Wolfe says that when writing the titular essay for Esquire in 1963, a look at the world of custom cars, he suffered from a severe case of writer's block. As his deadline approached, Wolfe compiled his notes, without much concern for the standard conventions of writing, and submitted them to his editor Byron Dobell. Dobell is said to have simply removed the salutation "Dear Byron" and run Wolfe's notes as the article.

Wolfe's account of the custom car culture centers on Ed Roth, one of the fathers of the Kustom Kulture movement and George Barris, who had a completely different philosophy of customizing cars (Roth’s pure art approach, as compared to Barris’ cars that were still designed for drivers), but called himself the "King of the Kustomizers."

The 22 essays in the book share no particular unifying theme other than Wolfe's experimental techniques in non-fiction writing. Subjects that crop up in this work, and continue throughout Wolfe's career, include his interests in status, culture, form and style.

Other major essays in the collection include, "Las Vegas (What?) Las Vegas (Can't hear you! Too noisy) Las Vegas!!!!", an early look at how outrageous Las Vegas was becoming, before the city was as well known as it is today; "The Fifth Beatle," on Murray the K; and "The First Tycoon of Teen," on Phil Spector.

The essay that many critics have considered the strongest is "The Last American Hero," a profile of Junior Johnson, an early star of the stock car racing world and NASCAR. In looking at a single day at the races, Wolfe also examines the rise of race day culture, how it is a stark contrast to the Grand Prix motor racing popular in Europe. The Last American Hero was made into a film in 1973, starring Jeff Bridges as "Junior Jackson," a character based on Johnson.

== Writing style ==
As the title of the book indicates, Wolfe liberally uses colorful language. In addition, he makes frequent use of onomatopoeia, and uses all manner of type: capitalization, italics, multiple exclamation points, dashes, etc. Another characteristic of Wolfe's writing is switching from highly technical or scientific explanations to very colloquial turns of phrase, often within a single sentence. And, just as Wolfe uses medical jargon when describing the body, he uses commercial language when describing products and slang and vulgarity when chronicling sub-cultures.

Most of these techniques remained hallmarks of Wolfe's writing style throughout his career, including in his publications following The Kandy-Kolored Tangerine-Flake Streamline Baby: The Pump House Gang, another collection of essays, and The Electric Kool-Aid Acid Test, Wolfe's chronicle of Ken Kesey and the Merry Pranksters.

== Publication ==
When first published, The Kandy-Kolored Tangerine-Flake Streamline Baby directed booksellers to stock the book in the sociology section of book stores. Many versions of the book are headed by an incomplete quotation from Kurt Vonnegut: "Verdict: Excellent book by a genius." Vonnegut's full quotation was "Verdict: Excellent book by a genius who will do anything to get attention." In the same review Kurt Vonnegut wrote: "Interestingly: the most tender piece in this collection depends upon a poem by Rudyard Kipling for depth, and has Huntington Hartford for its hero."

== Proposed adaptation ==
Film rights were bought in 1967 by the producing team of Irwin Winkler and Bob Chartoff, who had a deal at MGM. They announced John Boorman, who had just made Point Blank for them, as director. The film was never made.
