= Tom Wolfe =

American author and journalist (1930–2018)

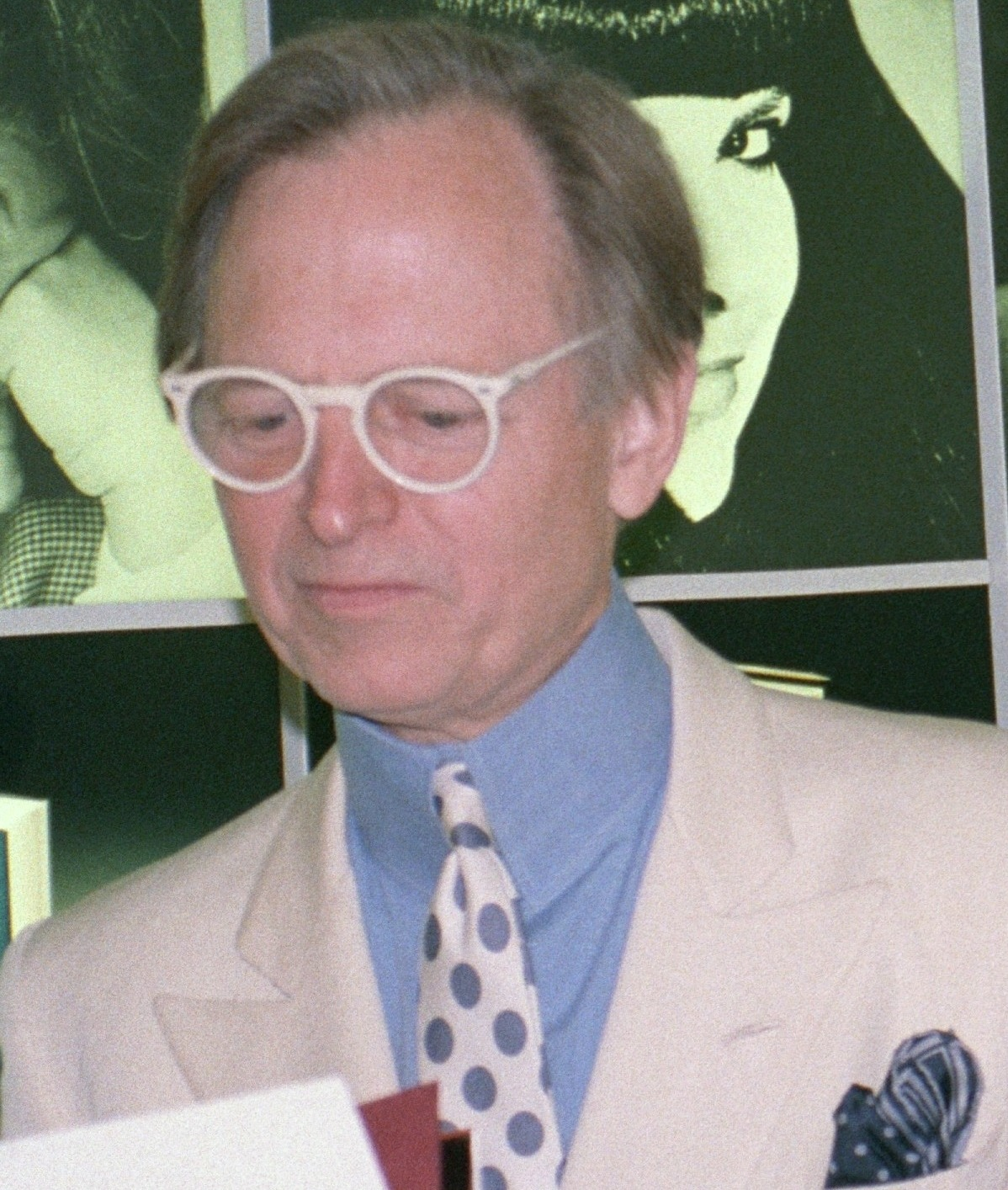
- Wolfe in 1988
- Born: Thomas Kennerly Wolfe Jr. March 2, 1930; Richmond, Virginia, U.S.
- Died: May 14, 2018 (aged 88); New York City, U.S.
- Education: Washington and Lee University (BA); Yale University (PhD)
- Occupations: Journalist; author
- Spouse: Sheila Berger (m. 1978)
- Children: 2
- Writing career
- Period: 1959–2016
- Notable works: The Kandy-Kolored Tangerine-Flake Streamline Baby (1965); The Electric Kool-Aid Acid Test (1968); The Right Stuff (1979); The Bonfire of the Vanities (1987)
- Movement: New Journalism

Thomas Kennerly Wolfe Jr. (March 2, 1930 – May 14, 2018) (Note: Some sources say 1931; The New York Times and Reuters both initially reported 1931 in their obituaries before changing to 1930. See "Tom Wolfe, 88, 'New Journalist' With Electric Style and Acid Pen, Dies". The New York Times. May 15, 2018. and Trott, Bill. "'Bonfire of the Vanities' author Tom Wolfe dead at 88". Reuters. Archived from the original on July 1, 2019.) was an American author and journalist widely known for his association with New Journalism, a style of news writing and journalism developed in the 1960s and 1970s that incorporated literary techniques. Much of Wolfe's work is satirical and centers on the counterculture of the 1960s and issues related to class, social status, and the lifestyles of the economic and intellectual elites of New York City.

Wolfe began his career as a regional newspaper reporter in the 1950s, achieving national prominence in the 1960s following the publication of such best-selling books as The Electric Kool-Aid Acid Test (an account of Ken Kesey and the Merry Pranksters) and two collections of articles and essays, The Kandy-Kolored Tangerine-Flake Streamline Baby and Radical Chic & Mau-Mauing the Flak Catchers. In 1979, he published the influential book The Right Stuff about the Mercury Seven astronauts, which was made into a 1983 film of the same name directed by Philip Kaufman.

His first novel, The Bonfire of the Vanities, published in 1987, was met with critical acclaim and also became a commercial success. Its adaptation as a motion picture of the same name, directed by Brian De Palma was a critical and commercial failure.

== Early life and education ==
Wolfe was born on March 2, 1930, in Richmond, Virginia, the son of Helen Perkins Hughes Wolfe, a garden designer, and Thomas Kennerly Wolfe Sr. (1893–1972), an agronomist and editor of The Southern Planter.

He grew up on Gloucester Road in the Richmond North Side neighborhood of Sherwood Park. He recounted childhood memories in a foreword to a book about the nearby historic Ginter Park neighborhood. He was student council president, editor of the school newspaper, and a star baseball player at St. Christopher's School, an Episcopal all-boys school in Richmond. In 1991, he wrote another touching remembrance of his childhood in Sherwood Park in a letter to a man who purchased the Wolfe home place.

Upon graduating in 1947, he turned down an offer to enroll at Princeton University to attend Washington and Lee University. At Washington and Lee, Wolfe was a member of the Phi Kappa Sigma fraternity. He majored in English, was sports editor of the college newspaper, and helped found a literary magazine, Shenandoah, giving him opportunities to practice his writing both inside and outside the classroom. Of particular influence was his professor Marshall Fishwick, a teacher of American studies educated at UVA and Yale. More in the tradition of anthropology than literary scholarship, Fishwick taught his students to look at the whole of a culture, including those elements considered profane. Wolfe's undergraduate thesis, entitled "A Zoo Full of Zebras: Anti-Intellectualism in America," evinced his fondness for words and aspirations toward cultural criticism. Wolfe graduated cum laude in 1951.

While still in college, Wolfe continued playing baseball as a pitcher and began to play semi-professionally. In 1952, he earned a tryout with the New York Giants, but was cut after three days, which he blamed on his inability to throw good fastballs. Wolfe abandoned baseball and instead followed his professor Fishwick's example, enrolling in Yale University's American studies doctoral program. His Ph.D. thesis was titled The League of American Writers: Communist Organizational Activity Among American Writers, 1929–1942. In the course of his research, Wolfe interviewed Malcolm Cowley, Archibald MacLeish, and James T. Farrell. A biographer remarked on the thesis: "Reading it, one sees what has been the most baleful influence of graduate education on many who have suffered through it: It deadens all sense of style." Originally rejected, his thesis was finally accepted after he rewrote it in an objective rather than a subjective style. Upon leaving Yale, he wrote a friend, explaining through expletives his personal opinions about his thesis.

== Journalism and New Journalism ==
Though Wolfe was offered teaching jobs in academia, he opted to work as a reporter. In 1956, while still preparing his thesis, Wolfe became a reporter for the Springfield Union in Springfield, Massachusetts. Wolfe finished his thesis in 1957.

In 1959, he was hired by The Washington Post. Wolfe has said that part of the reason he was hired by the Post was his lack of interest in politics. The Post's city editor was "amazed that Wolfe preferred cityside to Capitol Hill, the beat every reporter wanted." He won an award from The Newspaper Guild for foreign reporting in Cuba in 1961 and also won the Guild's award for humor. While at the Post, Wolfe experimented with fiction-writing techniques in feature stories.

In 1962, Wolfe left Washington D.C. for New York City, taking a position with the New York Herald Tribune as a general assignment reporter and feature writer. The editors of the Herald Tribune, including Clay Felker of the Sunday section supplement New York magazine, encouraged their writers to break the conventions of newspaper writing. Wolfe attracted attention in 1963 when, three months before the JFK assassination, he published an article on George Ohsawa and the sanpaku condition foretelling death.

During the 1962–63 New York City newspaper strike, Wolfe approached Esquire magazine about an article on the hot rod and custom car culture of southern California. He struggled with the article until his editor, Byron Dobell, suggested that Wolfe send him his notes so they could piece the story together. Wolfe procrastinated. The evening before the deadline, he typed a letter to Dobell explaining what he wanted to say on the subject, ignoring all journalistic conventions. Dobell's response was to remove the salutation "Dear Byron" from the top of the letter and publish it intact as reportage. The result, published in 1963, was "There Goes (Varoom! Varoom!) That Kandy-Kolored Tangerine-Flake Streamline Baby." The article was widely discussed—loved by some, hated by others. Its notoriety helped Wolfe gain publication of his first book, The Kandy-Kolored Tangerine-Flake Streamline Baby, a collection of his writings from the Herald-Tribune, Esquire, and other publications.

This was what Wolfe called New Journalism, in which some journalists and essayists experimented with a variety of literary techniques, mixing them with the traditional ideal of dispassionate, even-handed reporting. Wolfe experimented with four literary devices not normally associated with feature writing: scene-by-scene construction, extensive dialogue, multiple points of view, and detailed description of individuals' status-life symbols (the material choices people make) in writing this stylized form of journalism. He later referred to this style as literary journalism. Of the use of status symbols, Wolfe has said, "I think every living moment of a human being's life, unless the person is starving or in immediate danger of death in some other way, is controlled by a concern for status."

Wolfe also championed what he called "saturation reporting," a reportorial approach in which the journalist "shadows" and observes the subject over an extended period of time. "To pull it off," says Wolfe, "you casually have to stay with the people you are writing about for long stretches ... long enough so that you are actually there when revealing scenes take place in their lives." Saturation reporting differs from "in-depth" and "investigative" reporting, which involve the direct interviewing of numerous sources and/or the extensive analyzing of external documents relating to the story. Saturation reporting, according to communication professor Richard Kallan, "entails a more complex set of relationships wherein the journalist becomes an involved, more fully reactive witness, no longer distanced and detached from the people and events reported."

Wolfe's The Electric Kool-Aid Acid Test is considered a striking example of New Journalism. This account of the Merry Pranksters, a famous sixties counter-culture group, was highly experimental in Wolfe's use of onomatopoeia, free association, and eccentric punctuation—such as multiple exclamation marks and italics—to convey the manic ideas and personalities of Ken Kesey and his followers.

In addition to his own work, Wolfe edited a collection of New Journalism with E. W. Johnson, published in 1973 and titled The New Journalism. This book published pieces by Truman Capote, Hunter S. Thompson, Norman Mailer, Gay Talese, Joan Didion, and several other well-known writers, with the common theme of journalism that incorporated literary techniques and which could be considered literature.

== Non-fiction books ==
In 1965, Wolfe published a collection of his articles in this style, The Kandy-Kolored Tangerine-Flake Streamline Baby, adding to his notability. He published a second collection of articles, The Pump House Gang, in 1968. Wolfe wrote on popular culture, architecture, politics, and other topics that underscored, among other things, how American life in the 1960s had been transformed by post-WWII economic prosperity. His defining work from this era is The Electric Kool-Aid Acid Test (published the same day as The Pump House Gang in 1968), which for many epitomized the 1960s. Although a conservative in many ways (in 2008, he claimed never to have used LSD and to have tried marijuana only once), Wolfe became one of the notable figures of the decade.

In 1970, he published two essays in book form as Radical Chic & Mau-Mauing the Flak Catchers. "Radical Chic" was a biting account of a party given by composer and conductor Leonard Bernstein to raise money for the Black Panther Party. "Mau-Mauing The Flak Catchers" was about the practice by some African Americans of using racial intimidation ("mau-mauing") to extract funds from government welfare bureaucrats ("flak catchers"). Wolfe's phrase, "radical chic", soon became a popular derogatory term for critics to apply to upper-class leftism. His Mauve Gloves & Madmen, Clutter & Vine (1977) included Wolfe's noted essay, "The 'Me' Decade and the Third Great Awakening".

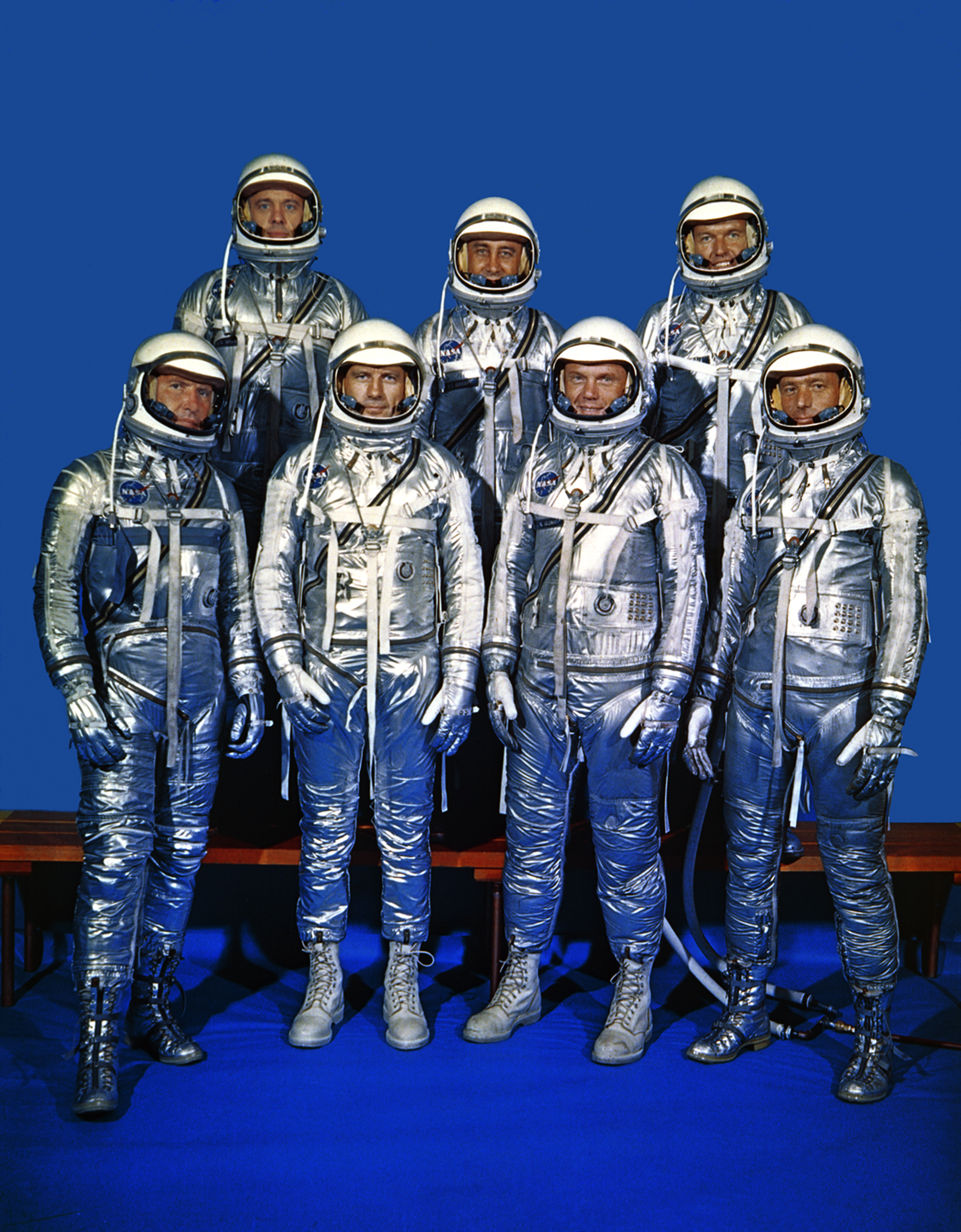
The Mercury Seven astronauts were the subject of The Right Stuff.

In 1979, Wolfe published The Right Stuff, an account of the pilots who became America's first astronauts. Following their training and unofficial, even foolhardy, exploits, he likened these heroes to "single combat warriors" of a bygone era, going forth to battle in the Space Race on behalf of their country. In 1983, the book was adapted into an Academy Award-winning feature film.

Wolfe also wrote two critiques of and social histories of modern art and modern architecture, The Painted Word and From Bauhaus to Our House, published in 1975 and 1981, respectively. The Painted Word mocked the excessive insularity of the art world and its dependence on what he saw as faddish critical theory. In From Bauhaus to Our House he explored what he said were the negative effects of the Bauhaus style on the evolution of modern architecture.

In 2016, Wolfe published The Kingdom of Speech, a critique of the work of Charles Darwin and Noam Chomsky. Wolfe synthesized what he construed as the views of Alfred Russel Wallace and Chomsky on the language organ as not being a product of natural selection to suggest that speech is an invention that is responsible for establishing our humanity. Some critics claimed that Wolfe's views on how humans developed speech were not supported by research and were opinionated.

== Made-for-TV movie ==
In 1977, PBS produced Tom Wolfe's Los Angeles, a fictional, satirical TV movie set in Los Angeles. Wolfe appears in the movie as himself.

== Novels ==
Throughout his early career, Wolfe had planned to write a novel to capture the wide reach of American society. Among his models was William Makepeace Thackeray's Vanity Fair, which described the society of 19th-century England. In 1981, he ceased his other work to concentrate on the novel.

Wolfe began researching the novel by observing cases at the Manhattan Criminal Court and shadowing members of the homicide squad in The Bronx. While the research came easily, he encountered difficulty in writing. To overcome his writer's block, Wolfe wrote to Jann Wenner, editor of Rolling Stone, to propose an idea drawn from Charles Dickens and Thackeray: to serialize his novel. Wenner offered Wolfe around $200,000 to serialize his work. The frequent deadline pressure gave him the motivation he had sought, and from July 1984 to August 1985, he published a new installment in each biweekly issue of Rolling Stone.

Later Wolfe was unhappy with his "very public first draft" and thoroughly revised his work, even changing his protagonist, Sherman McCoy. Wolfe had originally made him a writer, but recast him as a bond salesman. Wolfe researched and revised for two years, and his The Bonfire of the Vanities was published in 1987. The book was a commercial and critical success, spending weeks on bestseller lists and earning praise from the very literary establishment on which Wolfe had long heaped scorn.

Because of the success of Wolfe's first novel, there was widespread interest in his second. This novel took him more than 11 years to complete; A Man in Full was published in 1998. The book's reception was not universally favorable, though it received glowing reviews in Time, Newsweek, The Wall Street Journal, and elsewhere. An initial printing of 1.2 million copies was announced and the book stayed at number one on The New York Times' bestseller list for ten weeks. Noted author John Updike wrote a critical review for The New Yorker, complaining that the novel "amounts to entertainment, not literature, even literature in a modest aspirant form." His comments sparked an intense war of words in the print and broadcast media between Wolfe and Updike. Authors John Irving and Norman Mailer also entered the fray. The novel was selected to be adapted into a television series by Netflix in 2021.

In 2001, Wolfe published an essay referring to his three main literary critics as "My Three Stooges." That year he also published Hooking Up (a collection of short pieces, including the 1997 novella Ambush at Fort Bragg).

He published his third novel, I Am Charlotte Simmons (2004), chronicling the decline of a poor, bright scholarship student from Alleghany County, North Carolina, after attending an elite university. He conveys an institution filled with snobbery, materialism, anti-intellectualism, and sexual promiscuity. The novel met with a mostly tepid response by critics. Many social conservatives praised it in the belief that its portrayal revealed widespread moral decline. The novel won a Bad Sex in Fiction Award from the London-based Literary Review, a prize established "to draw attention to the crude, tasteless, often perfunctory use of redundant passages of sexual description in the modern novel". Wolfe later explained that such sexual references were deliberately clinical.

Wolfe wrote that his goal in writing fiction was to document contemporary society in the tradition of Charles Dickens, Émile Zola, and John Steinbeck.

Wolfe announced in early 2008 that he was leaving his longtime publisher, Farrar, Straus and Giroux. His fourth novel, Back to Blood, was published in October 2012 by Little, Brown and Company. According to The New York Times, Wolfe was paid close to US$7 million for the book. According to the publisher, Back to Blood is about "class, family, wealth, race, crime, sex, corruption and ambition in Miami, the city where America's future has arrived first." The book was released to mixed reviews. Back to Blood was an even bigger commercial failure than I Am Charlotte Simmons.

== Critical reception ==
Kurt Vonnegut said Wolfe is "the most exciting—or, at least, the most jangling—journalist to appear in some time," and "a genius who will do anything to get attention." Paul Fussell called Wolfe a splendid writer and stated "Reading him is exhilarating not because he makes us hopeful of the human future but because he makes us share the enthusiasm with which he perceives the actual." Critic Dwight Garner praised Wolfe as "a brilliantly gifted social observer and satirist" who "made a fetish of close and often comically slashing detail" and was "unafraid of kicking up at the pretensions of the literary establishment." Harold Bloom described Wolfe as "a fierce storyteller, and a vastly adequate social satirist". Novelist Louis Auchincloss praised Wolfe, describing The Bonfire of the Vanities as "a marvelous book".

Critic James Wood disparaged Wolfe's "big subjects, big people, and yards of flapping exaggeration. No one of average size emerges from his shop; in fact, no real human variety can be found in his fiction, because everyone has the same enormous excitability."

In 2000, Wolfe was criticised by Norman Mailer, John Updike and John Irving, after they were asked if they believed that his books were deserving of their critical acclaim. Mailer compared reading a Wolfe novel to having sex with a 300 lb woman, saying, "Once she gets to the top it's all over. Fall in love or be asphyxiated." Updike was more literary in his reservedness: He claimed that A Man in Full "amounts to entertainment, not literature, even literature in a modest aspirant form." Irving was perhaps the most dismissive, saying "It's like reading a bad newspaper or a bad piece in a magazine ... read sentences and watch yourself gag." Wolfe responded, saying, "It's a tantrum. It's a wonderful tantrum. A Man in Full panicked Irving the same way it panicked Updike and Norman. Frightened them. Panicked them." He later called Updike and Mailer "two old piles of bones" and said again that Irving was frightened by the quality of his work. Later that year he published an essay titled My Three Stooges about the critics.

== Recurring themes ==
Wolfe's writing throughout his career showed an interest in social status competition.

Much of Wolfe's later work addresses neuroscience. He notes his fascination in "Sorry, Your Soul Just Died", one of the essays in Hooking Up. This topic is also featured in I Am Charlotte Simmons, as the title character is a student of neuroscience. Wolfe describes the characters' thought and emotional processes, such as fear, humiliation and lust, in the clinical terminology of brain chemistry. Wolfe also frequently gives detailed descriptions of various aspects of his characters' anatomies.

== White suit ==
Wolfe adopted wearing a white suit as a trademark in 1962. He bought his first white suit, planning to wear it in the summer, in the style of the seersucker of a Southern gentlemen. He found that the suit he had bought was too heavy for summer use, so he wore it in winter, which created a sensation. At the time, white suits were supposed to be reserved for summer wear. Wolfe maintained this as a trademark. He sometimes accompanied it with a white tie, white homburg hat, and two-tone spectator shoes. Wolfe said that the outfit disarmed the people he observed, making him, in their eyes, "a man from Mars, the man who didn't know anything and was eager to know."

== Views ==
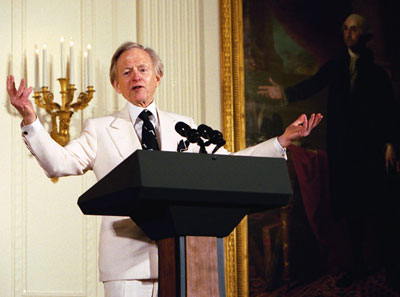
Wolfe at the White House, 2004

In 1989, Wolfe wrote an essay for Harper's Magazine, titled "Stalking the Billion-Footed Beast". It criticized modern American novelists for failing to engage fully with their subjects, and suggested that modern literature could be saved by a greater reliance on journalistic technique.

Asked to comment by The Wall Street Journal on blogs in 2007 to mark the tenth anniversary of their advent, Wolfe wrote that "the universe of blogs is a universe of rumors" and that "blogs are an advance guard to the rear." He also took the opportunity to criticize Wikipedia, saying that "only a primitive would believe a word of" it. He noted a story about him in his Wikipedia bio article at the time which he said had never happened.

=== Politics ===
Wolfe's views and choice of subject material, such as mocking left-wing intellectuals in Radical Chic, glorifying astronauts in The Right Stuff, and critiquing Noam Chomsky in The Kingdom of Speech sometimes resulted in his being labeled conservative. Wolfe has been labeled a conservative by The New Yorker, Vanity Fair, The Washington Post, National Review, and USA Today. Editor Byron Dobell labelled Wolfe a reactionary; while a member of the Black Panther Party called him a racist, due to his portrayal of the party in Radical Chic.

Wolfe rejected such labels, saying, "If I have been judged to be right wing, I think this is because of the things I have mocked." Wolfe opposed the American two-party system. In an October 2012 interview with New York magazine, he stated that he had "voted for every [presidential election] winner since I've been old enough to vote", with the exception of Bill Clinton in the 1992 election. Later in the interview, Wolfe said: "Our federal government is like a train on the track... There are people on the right and people on the left, they're yelling at it. The train has no choice; it's on its track! Everyone gets forced to the center, which is fine with me... I read all these things about the country fading, but if you really think about it, we're still giants!"

Wolfe supported George W. Bush as a political candidate and said he voted for him for president in 2004 because of what he called Bush's "great decisiveness and willingness to fight". Bush reciprocated the admiration, and is said to have read all of Wolfe's books, according to friends in 2005. Wolfe enthusiastically supported the U.S. invasion of Afghanistan, but was more apprehensive about the Iraq War.

In a 2004 interview with The Guardian, Wolfe said that his "idol" in writing about society and culture is Émile Zola. Wolfe described Zola as "a man of the left", one who "went out, and found a lot of ambitious, drunk, slothful and mean people out there. Zola simply could not—and was not interested in—telling a lie." In the same interview, Wolfe said that political correctness "has probably had a good effect because it is now bad manners to use racial epithets." However, in 2017, he attacked political correctness, mocking it as perpetual outrage.

In 2016, Wolfe described Donald Trump as a "lovable megalomaniac...The childishness makes him seem honest." Wolfe later compared Trump to literary character Jay Gatsby.

=== Religion ===
Wolfe was an atheist but said that "I hate people who go around saying they're atheists". Of his religious upbringing, Wolfe observed that he "was raised as a Presbyterian". He sometimes referred to himself as a "lapsed Presbyterian." Wolfe was a defender of Catholic schools. Wolfe was also critical of the sexual revolution, describing it as a "sexual carnival." He expressed sympathy towards Puritanical-Christian views on sexuality.

== Personal life ==
Wolfe lived in New York City with his wife Sheila, who designed covers for Harper's Magazine. They had two children: a daughter, Alexandra; and a son, Thomas Kennerly III.

== Death and legacy ==
Wolfe died from an infection in Manhattan on May 14, 2018, at the age of 88.

The historian Meredith Hindley credits Wolfe with introducing the terms "statusphere", "the right stuff", "radical chic", "the Me Decade" and "good ol' boy" into the English lexicon.

Wolfe was at times incorrectly credited with coining the term "trophy wife". His term for extremely thin women in his novel The Bonfire of the Vanities was "social X-rays".

According to journalism professor Ben Yagoda, Wolfe is also responsible for the use of the present tense in magazine profile pieces; before he began doing so in the early 1960s, profile articles had always been written in the past tense.

Wolfe is the subject of the 2023 documentary film Radical Wolfe. The film was based on a 2015 article by Michael Lewis and directed by Richard Dewey. The Los Angeles Times described it as "a sprightly look at what made the reporter-trained Wolfe into the insider's outsider, how he made the leap to explicating—in supercharged, acrobatic sentences—our fast-changing, roving world of cliques, castes and subgroups".

== List of awards and nominations ==
- 1961 Washington Newspaper Guild Award for Foreign News Reporting
- 1961 Washington Newspaper Guild Award for Humor
- 1970 Society of Magazine Writers Award for Excellence
- 1971 D.F.A., Minneapolis College of Art and Design
- 1973 Frank Luther Mott Research Award
- 1974 D.Litt., Washington and Lee University
- 1977 Virginia Laureate for literature
- 1979 National Book Critics Circle Finalist General Nonfiction Finalist for The Right Stuff
- 1980 National Book Award for Nonfiction for The Right Stuff (Note: This was the award for hardcover "General Nonfiction". From 1980 to 1983 in National Book Award history, there were dual awards for hardcover and paperback books in many categories, including several nonfiction subcategories. Most of the paperback award-winners were reprints, including the 1980 General Nonfiction.)
- 1980 Columbia Journalism Award for The Right Stuff
- 1980 Harold D. Vursell Memorial Award of the American Institute of Arts and Letters
- 1980 Art History Citation from the National Sculpture Society
- 1983 L.H.D., Virginia Commonwealth University
- 1984 L.H.D., Southampton College
- 1984 John Dos Passos Prize
- 1986 Gari Melchers Medal
- 1986 Benjamin Pierce Cheney Medal from Eastern Washington University
- 1986 Washington Irving Medal for Literary Excellence
- 1987 National Book Critics Circle fiction Finalist for The Bonfire of the Vanities
- 1987 D.F.A., School of Visual Arts
- 1988 L.H.D., Randolph–Macon College
- 1988 L.H.D., Manhattanville College
- 1989 L.H.D., Longwood College
- 1990 St. Louis Literary Award from Saint Louis University Library Associates
- 1990 D.Litt., St. Andrews Presbyterian College
- 1990 D.Litt., Johns Hopkins University
- 1993 D.Litt., University of Richmond
- 1998 National Book Award Finalist for A Man in Full
- 2001 National Humanities Medal
- 2003 Chicago Tribune Literary Prize for Lifetime Achievement
- 2004 Bad Sex in Fiction Award from Literary Review
- 2005 Golden Plate Award of the American Academy of Achievement
- 2006 Jefferson Lecture in Humanities
- 2010 National Book Foundation Medal for Distinguished Contribution to American Letters

== Television and film appearances ==
- Wolfe's legs appeared in John Lennon and Yoko Ono's 1971 film Up Your Legs Forever
- In July 1975, Wolfe was interviewed on Firing Line by William F. Buckley Jr., discussing The Painted Word.
- Wolfe was featured as an interview subject in the 1987 PBS documentary series Space Flight.
- Wolfe was featured on the February 2006 episode "The White Stuff" of Speed Channel's Unique Whips, where his Cadillac's interior was customized to match his trademark white suit.
- Wolfe guest-starred alongside Jonathan Franzen, Gore Vidal and Michael Chabon in The Simpsons episode "Moe'N'a Lisa", which aired November 19, 2006. He was originally slated to be killed by a giant boulder, but that ending was edited out. Wolfe was also used as a sight gag on The Simpsons episode "Insane Clown Poppy", which aired on November 12, 2000. Homer spills chocolate on Wolfe's trademark white suit, and Wolfe rips it off in one swift motion, revealing an identical suit underneath. The episode "Flanders' Ladder" was dedicated to the memory of Wolfe as seen at the end of the episode's credits.
- He appeared in the documentary film Salinger (2013)

== Works ==
=== Nonfiction ===
- The Kandy-Kolored Tangerine-Flake Streamline Baby (1965)
- The Electric Kool-Aid Acid Test (1968)
- The Pump House Gang (1968)
- Radical Chic & Mau-Mauing the Flak Catchers (1970)
- The New Journalism (1973) (Ed. with E. W. Johnson)
- The Painted Word (1975)
- Mauve Gloves & Madmen, Clutter & Vine (1976)
- The Right Stuff (1979)
- In Our Time (1980)
- From Bauhaus to Our House (1981)
- The Purple Decades (1982; selected excerpts of previous works)
- Hooking Up (2000)
- The Kingdom of Speech (2016)

=== Novels ===
- The Bonfire of the Vanities (1987)
- Ambush at Fort Bragg (novella, 1996/7)
- A Man in Full (1998)
- I Am Charlotte Simmons (2004)
- Back to Blood (2012)

=== Notable articles ===
- "Kennedy to Bardot, Too Much Sanpaku", New York Herald Tribune, August 18, 1963
- "The Last American Hero Is Junior Johnson. Yes!" Esquire, March 1965.
- "Tiny Mummies! The True Story of the Ruler of 43rd Street's Land of the Walking Dead!" New York Herald-Tribune supplement (April 11, 1965).
- "Lost in the Whichy Thicket," New York Herald-Tribune supplement (April 18, 1965).
- "The Birth of the New Journalism: Eyewitness Report by Tom Wolfe." New York, February 14, 1972.
- "The New Journalism: A la Recherche des Whichy Thickets." New York, February 21, 1972.
- "Why They Aren't Writing the Great American Novel Anymore." Esquire, December 1972.
- "The Me Decade and the Third Great Awakening" New York, August 23, 1976.
- "Stalking the Billion-Footed Beast", Harper's. November 1989.
- "Sorry, but Your Soul Just Died." Forbes 1996.
- "Pell Mell." The Atlantic Monthly (November 2007).
- "The Rich Have Feelings, Too." Vanity Fair (September 2009).

== See also ==
- Creative nonfiction
- Hysterical realism
- Wolfe's concept of fiction-absolute

== Sources ==
- Bloom, Harold, ed. (2001), Tom Wolfe (Modern Critical Views), Philadelphia: Chelsea House Publishers, ISBN 0-7910-5916-2
- McKeen, William. (1995), Tom Wolfe, New York: Twayne Publishers, ISBN 0-8057-4004-X
- Ragen, Brian Abel. (2002), Tom Wolfe; A Critical Companion, Westport, Connecticut: Greenwood Press, ISBN 0-313-31383-0
- Scura, Dorothy, ed. (1990), Conversations with Tom Wolfe, Jackson: University Press of Mississippi, ISBN 0-87805-426-X
- Shomette, Doug, ed. (1992), The Critical Response to Tom Wolfe, Westport, Connecticut: Greenwood Press, ISBN 0-313-27784-2
