= The Bonfire of the Vanities =

1987 novel by Tom Wolfe

- Cover of the first edition
- Author: Tom Wolfe
- Cover artist: Fred Marcellino
- Language: English
- Genre: Social criticism
- Publisher: Farrar, Straus and Giroux
- Publication date: October 1987
- Publication place: United States
- Media type: Print (Hardback & Paperback)
- Pages: 690
- ISBN: 0-312-42757-3
- OCLC: 213470814
- Followed by: A Man in Full

The Bonfire of the Vanities is a 1987 novel by Tom Wolfe. The story is a drama about ambition, racism, social class, politics, and greed in 1980s New York City, and centers on three main characters: WASP bond trader Sherman McCoy, Jewish assistant district attorney Larry Kramer, and British expatriate journalist Peter Fallow.

The novel was originally conceived as a serial in the style of Charles Dickens' writings: it ran in 27 installments in Rolling Stone starting in 1984. Wolfe heavily revised the story before it was published in book form. The novel was a bestseller and a commercial success, even in comparison with Wolfe's other books. It has often been called the quintessential novel of the 1980s, and in 1990 was adapted into the critically and commercially unsuccessful film of the same name by Brian De Palma.

== Title ==
The book is named for the historical bonfire of the vanities, which happened in 1497 in Florence, Italy, when the city was under the sway of the Dominican priest Girolamo Savonarola, who ordered the burning of objects that church authorities considered sinful, such as cosmetics, mirrors, books, and art.

== Historical background ==
Wolfe intended his novel to capture the essence of New York City in the 1980s.

Beneath Wall Street's success, the city was a hotbed of racial and cultural tension. The city was polarized by several high-profile incidents of racism, particularly the murders—in white neighborhoods—of two black men: Willie Turks, who was murdered in the Gravesend section of Brooklyn in 1982, and Michael Griffith who was killed in Howard Beach, Queens, in 1986. In another episode that received much attention from the news media, Bernhard Goetz became something of a folk-hero in the city for shooting a group of young black men who allegedly tried to rob him in the subway in 1984.

Burton B. Roberts, a Bronx judge known for his no-nonsense, imperious handling of cases in his courtroom, was the model for the character of Myron Kovitsky in the book.

== Writing and publication ==
Wolfe began researching the novel by observing cases at the Manhattan Criminal Court and shadowing members of the Bronx homicide squad. To overcome a case of writer's block, Wolfe wrote to Jann Wenner, editor of Rolling Stone, to propose an idea drawn from Charles Dickens and Thackeray. These Victorian writers, whom Wolfe viewed as his models, had often written their novels in serial installments. Wenner offered Wolfe around $200,000 to serialize his work. The deadline pressure gave him the motivation he had hoped for, and from July 1984 to August 1985 each biweekly issue of Rolling Stone contained a new installment. Wolfe was not happy with his "very public first draft," and thoroughly revised his work. Even Sherman McCoy, the central character of the novel, changed—originally a writer, in the book version he is cast as a bond salesman. (Wolfe came up with the revised occupation after spending a day on the government-bond desk of Salomon Brothers, with many of the traders who later founded the notorious hedge fund Long-Term Capital Management.) Wolfe researched and revised for two years before The Bonfire of the Vanities appeared in 1987. The book was a commercial and critical success, spending weeks on bestseller lists and earning praise from much of the literary establishment on which Wolfe had long heaped scorn.

== Plot summary ==
Sherman McCoy is a successful New York City bond trader. His $3 million Park Avenue co-op apartment, combined with his wife's extravagances and other expenses required to keep up appearances are depleting his great income, or as McCoy calls it, a "hemorrhaging of money." McCoy's secure life as a self-regarded "Master of The Universe" on Wall Street is gradually destroyed when he and his mistress, Maria Ruskin, accidentally enter the Bronx at night while they are driving back to Manhattan from Kennedy Airport. Finding the ramp back to the highway blocked by trash cans and a tire, McCoy exits the car to clear the way. Approached by two black men whom they perceive as predators, McCoy and Ruskin flee. After Ruskin takes the wheel of the car to race away, it fishtails, apparently striking one of the two would-be assailants—a "skinny boy."

Peter Fallow, a has-been, alcoholic journalist for the tabloid City Light, is given the opportunity of a lifetime when he is persuaded to write a series of articles about Henry Lamb, a black youth who has said he has been the victim of a hit and run by a wealthy white driver. Fallow cynically tolerates the manipulations of Reverend Bacon, a Harlem religious and political leader who sees the hospitalized youth as a projects success story gone wrong. Fallow's articles on the matter ignite protests and media coverage of the Lamb case.

Up for re-election and accused of foot-dragging in the Lamb case, the media-obsessed Bronx County District Attorney Abe Weiss pushes for McCoy's arrest. The evidence includes McCoy's car (which matches the description of the vehicle involved in the alleged hit and run), plus McCoy's evasive response to police questioning. The arrest all but ruins McCoy; distraction at work causes him to flub on finding an investor for a $600 million bond on which he had pegged all his hopes of paying the loan on his home and covering his family costs. While McCoy is reprimanded by his boss for failing to sell the bond, his lawyer, Tommy Killian, calls to tell him of his upcoming arrest, forcing him to admit his legal problems to his boss, who makes him take a leave of absence as a result. McCoy's upper class friends ostracize him, and his wife leaves him and takes their daughter Campbell (McCoy's only source of genuine family love) to live with his parents.

Hoping to impress his boss as well as a former juror, Shelly Thomas, Assistant District Attorney Larry Kramer prosecutes the case, opening with an unsuccessful bid to set McCoy's bail at $250,000. Released on $10,000 bail, McCoy is besieged by demonstrators who are protesting outside his home.

Fallow hears a rumor that Maria Ruskin was at the wheel of McCoy's car when it struck Lamb but has fled the country. Trying to uncover the truth, on the pretense of interviewing the rich and famous, Fallow meets with her husband, Arthur, at an expensive French restaurant. While recounting his life, Arthur has a fatal heart attack, as disturbed patrons and an annoyed maître d'hôtel look on. Maria is forced to return to the United States for his funeral, where McCoy confronts her about being "the only witness." Fallow overhears that she, not McCoy, was driving.

Fallow's write-up of the association between Sherman McCoy and Maria Ruskin prompts Assistant D.A. Kramer to offer her a deal: corroborate the other witness (Roland Auburn, the second man present at the incident, who said Sherman drove) and receive immunity, or be treated as an accomplice. Ruskin recounts this to McCoy while he is wearing a wire. When a private investigator employed by Killian discovers a recording of a conversation that contradicts Ruskin's statement to the grand jury—a recording that was obtained from an illegal voice-activated intercom device installed by the landlord of a rent-controlled apartment as a way to remove tenants—the judge assigned to the case declares her testimony "tainted" and dismisses the case.

Fallow later wins the Pulitzer Prize and marries the daughter of City Light owner Sir Gerald Steiner, while Ruskin has escaped prosecution and remarried. McCoy's first trial ends in a hung jury, split along racial lines. Kramer is removed from the prosecution after it is revealed he was involved with Shelly Thomas in a sexual tryst at the apartment formerly used by Ruskin and McCoy. It is additionally revealed that McCoy has lost a civil trial to the Lamb family and, pending appeal, has a $12 million liability, which has resulted in the freezing of his assets. The all-but-forgotten Henry Lamb succumbs to his injuries from the accident; McCoy, penniless and estranged from his wife and daughter, awaits trial for vehicular manslaughter.

== Style and content ==
Bonfire was Wolfe's first novel. Wolfe's prior works were mostly non-fiction journalistic articles and books. His earlier short stories appeared in his collection Mauve Gloves & Madmen, Clutter & Vine.

According to Wolfe, the characters are composites of many individuals and cultural observations. However, some characters were based on real people. Wolfe has acknowledged the character of Tommy Killian is based on New York lawyer Edward Hayes, to whom the book is dedicated. The character of the Reverend Bacon is considered by many to be based on the Reverends Al Sharpton and/or Jesse Jackson, who have both campaigned under the banner of eliminating racism.

In 2007, on the book's 20th anniversary of publication, The New York Times published a retrospective on how the city had changed since Wolfe's novel.

== Reception ==
The book was a major bestseller, and also received strong reviews. The New York Times praised the book, saying it was "a big, bitter, funny, craftily plotted book that grabs you by the lapels and won't let go", but criticized its sometimes superficial characters, saying when "the book is over, there is an odd aftertaste, not entirely pleasant." However, National Review claimed "No one has portrayed New York Society this accurately & devastatingly since Edith Wharton."

Novelist Louis Auchincloss praised it as "a marvelous book".

== Adaptations ==
In 1990, Bonfire was adapted into a film starring Tom Hanks as Sherman McCoy, Kim Cattrall as his wife Judy, Melanie Griffith as his mistress Maria, and Bruce Willis as journalist (and narrator of the film) Peter Fallow. The screenplay was written by Michael Cristofer. Wolfe was paid $750,000 for the rights. The film was a commercial and critical flop.

An opera adaptation, The Bonfire of the Vanities: The Opera, with music by Stefania de Kenessey and libretto and direction by Michael Bergmann, premiered in New York City on October 9, 2015.

== See also ==
- Wall Street, the 1987 Academy Award-winning film by Oliver Stone
- Liar's Poker
- Den of Thieves
- Barbarians at the Gate
- Billionaire Boys Club
