= 27th =

27th is the ordinal form of the number 27. 27th or Twenty-seventh may also refer to:

- A fraction, 1/27, equal to one of 27 equal parts
- 27th of the month, a recurring calendar date

== Geography ==
- 27th meridian east, a line of longitude
- 27th meridian west, a line of longitude
- 27th parallel north, a circle of latitude
- 27th parallel south, a circle of latitude
- 27th Avenue
- 27th Street (disambiguation)

== Military ==
- 27th Army (disambiguation)
- 27th Battalion (disambiguation)
- 27th Brigade (disambiguation)
- 27th Division (disambiguation)
- 27th Regiment (disambiguation)
- 27th Squadron (disambiguation)

== Other ==
- Twenty-seventh Amendment (disambiguation)
  - Twenty-seventh Amendment to the United States Constitution
- 27th century
- 27th century BC

== See also ==
- 27 (disambiguation)
- The 27th Day, 1957 American black-and-white science fiction film
- The Twenty-Seventh City, 1988 American satirical thriller novel
