= 27th Cavalry =

27th Cavalry may refer to:

== Divisions ==
- 27th Cavalry Division (Soviet Union)

== Regiments ==
- 27th Cavalry Regiment (United States)
- 27th Light Cavalry, India
- 27th Texas Cavalry Regiment, Confederate States Army

== Companies ==
- 27th (Devonshire) Company, Imperial Yeomanry

== See also ==
- 27th Division (disambiguation)
- 27th Brigade (disambiguation)
- 27th Regiment (disambiguation)
- 27th (disambiguation)
