= Class 27 =

Class 27 may refer to:

- Belgian Railways Class 27, electric locomotive
- British Rail Class 27, diesel locomotive
- EAR 27 class, steam locomotive
- GER Class D27, steam locomotive
- L&YR Class 27, steam locomotive
- PKP class OKl27, steam locomotive
- Rio Grande class K-27, steam locomotive
- SNCB Class 27, electric locomotive
- U-27-class submarine (disambiguation)

== See also ==
- Type 27 (disambiguation)
