= 27 =

27 may refer to:

- 27 (number), the natural number following 26 and preceding 28
- One of the years 27 BC, AD 27, 1927, 2027

== Music ==
=== Artists ===
- 27 (band), an American rock band from Boston, Massachusetts
- 27 Club, artists who died at the age of 27

=== Albums ===
- 27 (Ciro y los Persas album), 2012
- 27 (Falz album), 2017
- 27, by Cunter, 2013
- 27 (EP), by Kim Sung-kyu, 2015

=== Songs ===
- "27" (song), by Biffy Clyro, 2002
- "27", by Fall Out Boy from Folie à Deux, 2008
- "27", by Machine Gun Kelly from Bloom, 2017
- "27", by Title Fight from Shed, 2011
- "Twenty-Seven", by Lagwagon from Double Plaidinum, 1997

=== Other works ===
- 27 (opera), by Ricky Ian Gordon and Royce Vavrek, 2014
- 27 (film), a French-Hungarian animated short film by Flóra Anna Buda, 2023
- 27, a play by Abi Morgan, 2011

== Science ==
- Cobalt, a transition metal in the periodic table
- 27 Euterpe, an asteroid in the asteroid belt

== Other uses ==
- 27 (artist) or Deuce 7, American street artist
- The international calling code for South Africa
- iOS 27, an Apple operating system

== See also ==
- 27th (disambiguation)
- Type 27 (disambiguation)
- List of highways numbered 27
