= NS27 =

NS27, NS 27, NS-27, NS.27, or variation, may refer to:

== Places ==
- Marina Bay MRT station (station code: NS27), Downtown Core, Singapore; a mass transit station
- Halifax Citadel-Sable Island (constituency N.S. 27), Nova Scotia, Canada; a provincial electoral district

== Other uses ==
- North Shore Rail Road NS #27, a Pullman passenger car s/n 254, preserved and operated on the White Pass; see List of White Pass and Yukon Route locomotives and cars
- New Penguin Shakespeare volume 27
- Blue Origin NS-27, a suborbital spaceflight by the New Shepard tourist rocket

== See also ==
- NS (disambiguation)
- 27 (disambiguation)
