= Coupé de ville =

Car body style produced from 1908 to 1939

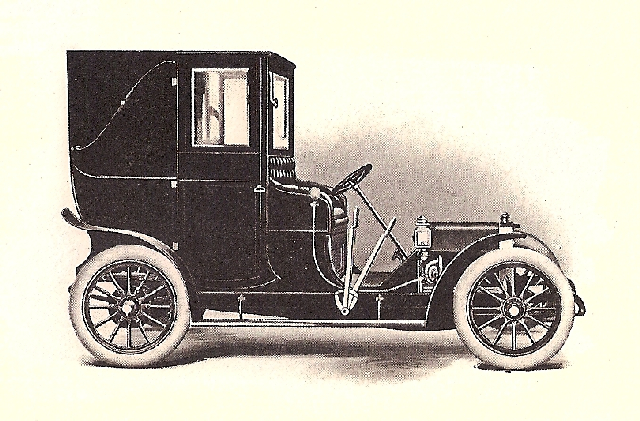
1908 Thomas 4-20 town car

Coupé de ville—also known as town car or sedanca de ville—is a car body style produced from 1908 to 1939 with an external or open-topped driver's position and an enclosed compartment for passengers. Although the different terms may have once had specific meanings for certain car manufacturers or countries, the terms are often used interchangeably.

Some coupés de ville have the passengers separated from the driver in a fully enclosed compartment while others have a canopy for the passengers and no partition between the driver and the passengers (passengers enter the compartment via driver's area).

== Origin ==
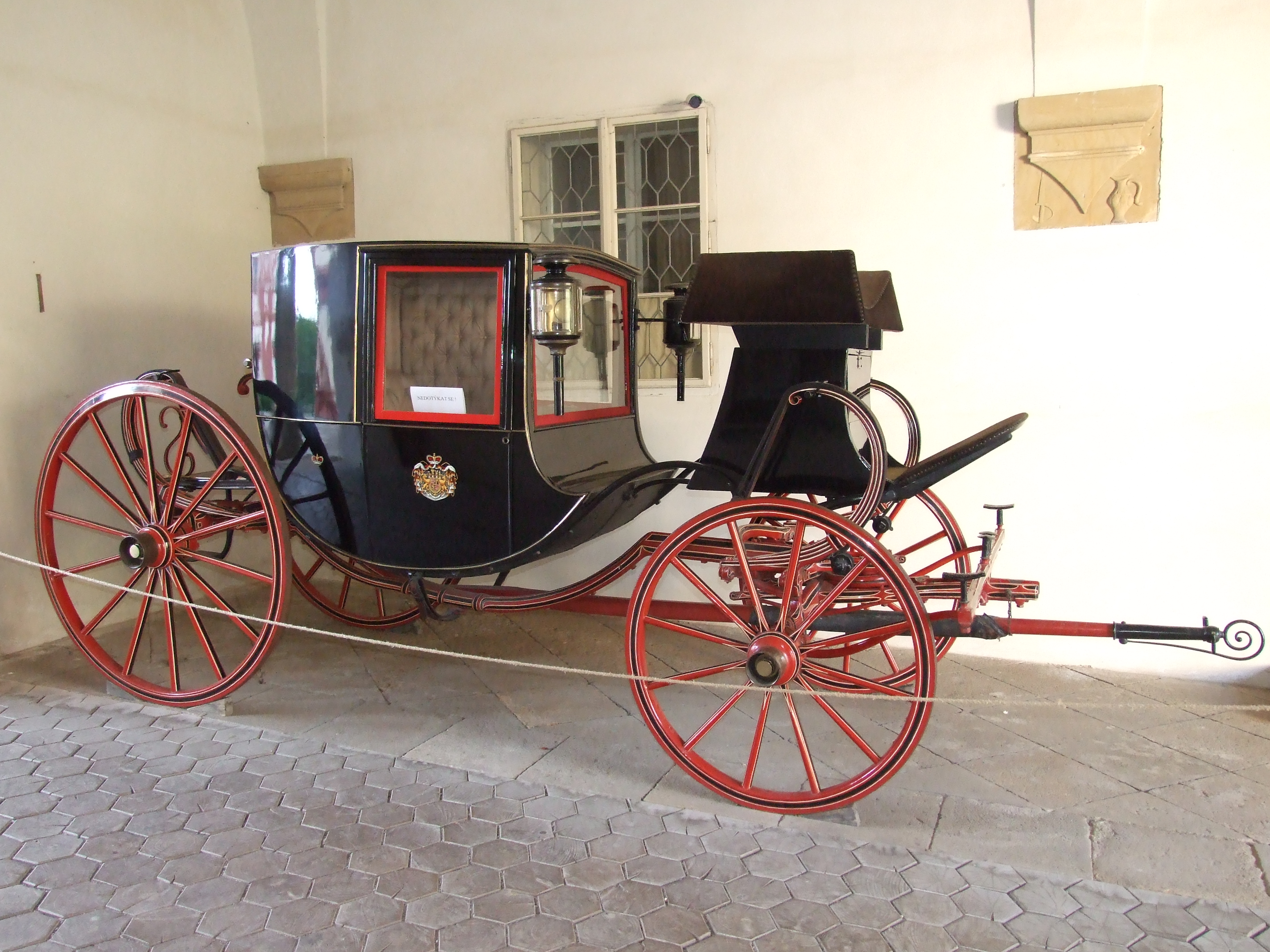
Coupé carriage

The separate exposed area for the driver followed from horse-drawn carriages.

The term "coupé de ville" came into existence in the 19th century before the invention of the automobile. The initial usage of the term was for a variant of the coupé carriage that is very similar to the British clarence carriage.

The term "de ville" is French for "for town" and indicates that the vehicle is for use in town or for short distances. When added to the end of a body style (saloon, coupé, landaulet, etc.), "de Ville" indicated that the top over the driver's compartment could be folded away, retracted, or otherwise removed. As a vehicle for town use, the coupé de ville usually had no facilities for carrying luggage.

== Design ==
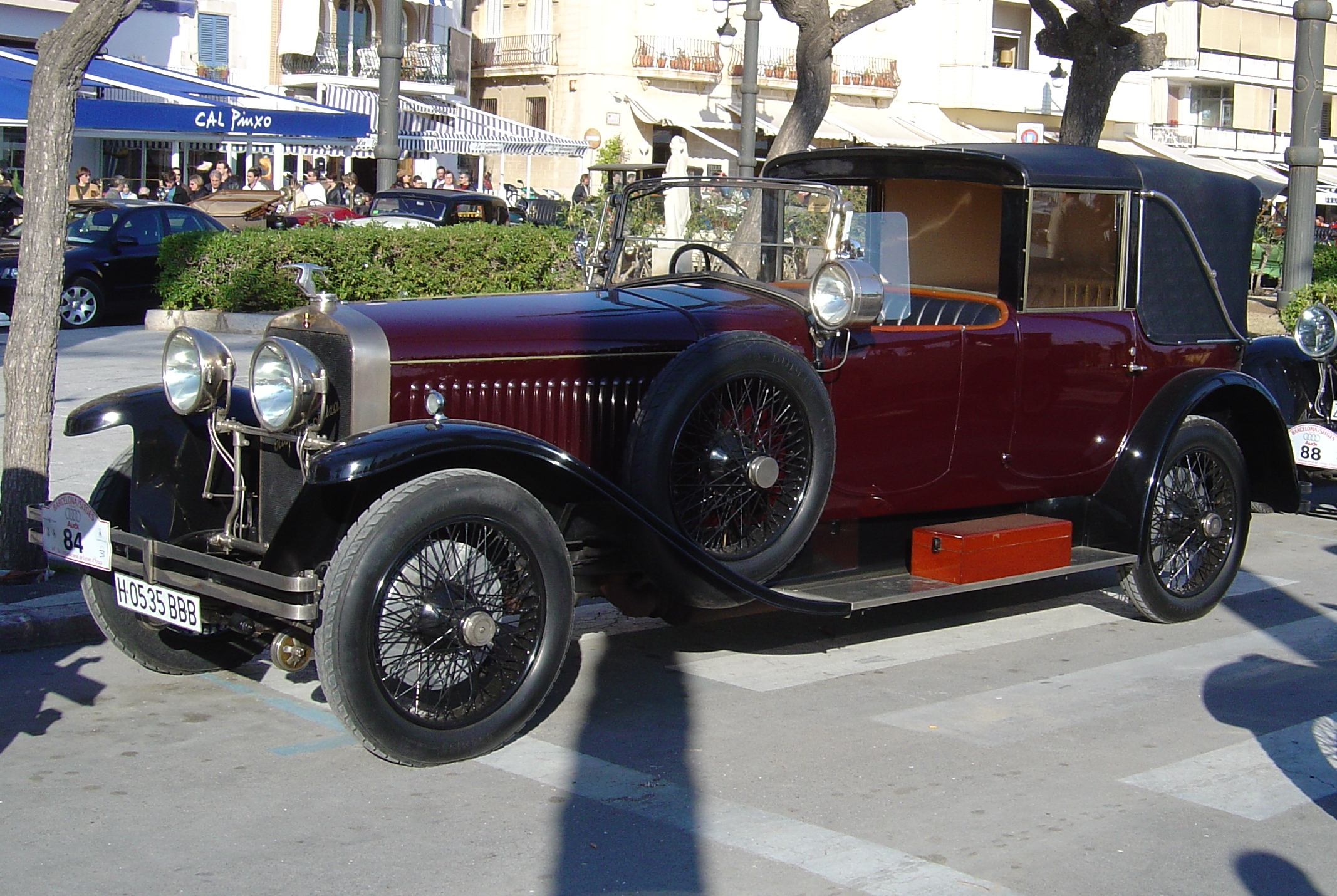
1925 Hispano-Suiza Type H.6 with collapsible rear compartment roof, also called a Landaulet

Early cars had the driver fully exposed to the weather with no cover, no doors, and sometimes no windshield,. As speed and distances travelled increased, windshields were added to protect the driver from dirt from the unpaved roads and dung from draught animals. Later models also included doors to the driving compartment.

Early roofs for the driver's area were made of a single skin of leather without any structural support, and were held in place between the passenger compartment and the windshield by poppers to allow for easy removal or rollback when the weather allowed. From the late 1920s onward some designs used a metal two-skin roof which retracted into a void above the passenger compartment, either manually or electrically.

Due to its use as a chauffeured vehicle, the passenger compartment was normally luxurious, clad in the best materials, with seating for between two and most often up to six or occasionally eight persons using jump seats for lighter passengers and short distances, made of the finest cotton or silk adorned with brocade. The same material was also most often used to provide substantial curtain coverage for the compartment, and was matched by substantial carpet and fine woodwork. The driver's compartment had leather seats to endure bad weather.

Some versions had a partition between the driver and the passengers, which would often accommodate various compartments for drinks and conveniences.. These partitions often had a small slide-back glass window, or were completely made of glass with a manual or electric winding system. The passengers could speak to the driver through a communications tube, or, from the 1920s, through an electrical device similar to a telephone. Some designs included a switch panel in the rear passenger compartment, which contained a speedometer and switches to impart the most common instructions to the driver via a lighted dashboard panel, such as "stop", "left", "right", or "home".

== Variants ==
=== Town car / town brougham ===
The name "town car" is an Anglicized version of "de Ville".

In the United States, a coupé de ville with rear doors for the passenger area, no roof or sides for the driver's area, and a partition between the passengers and the driver was referred to as a "town car" or "town brougham". Town cars normally had side windows in the doors only.

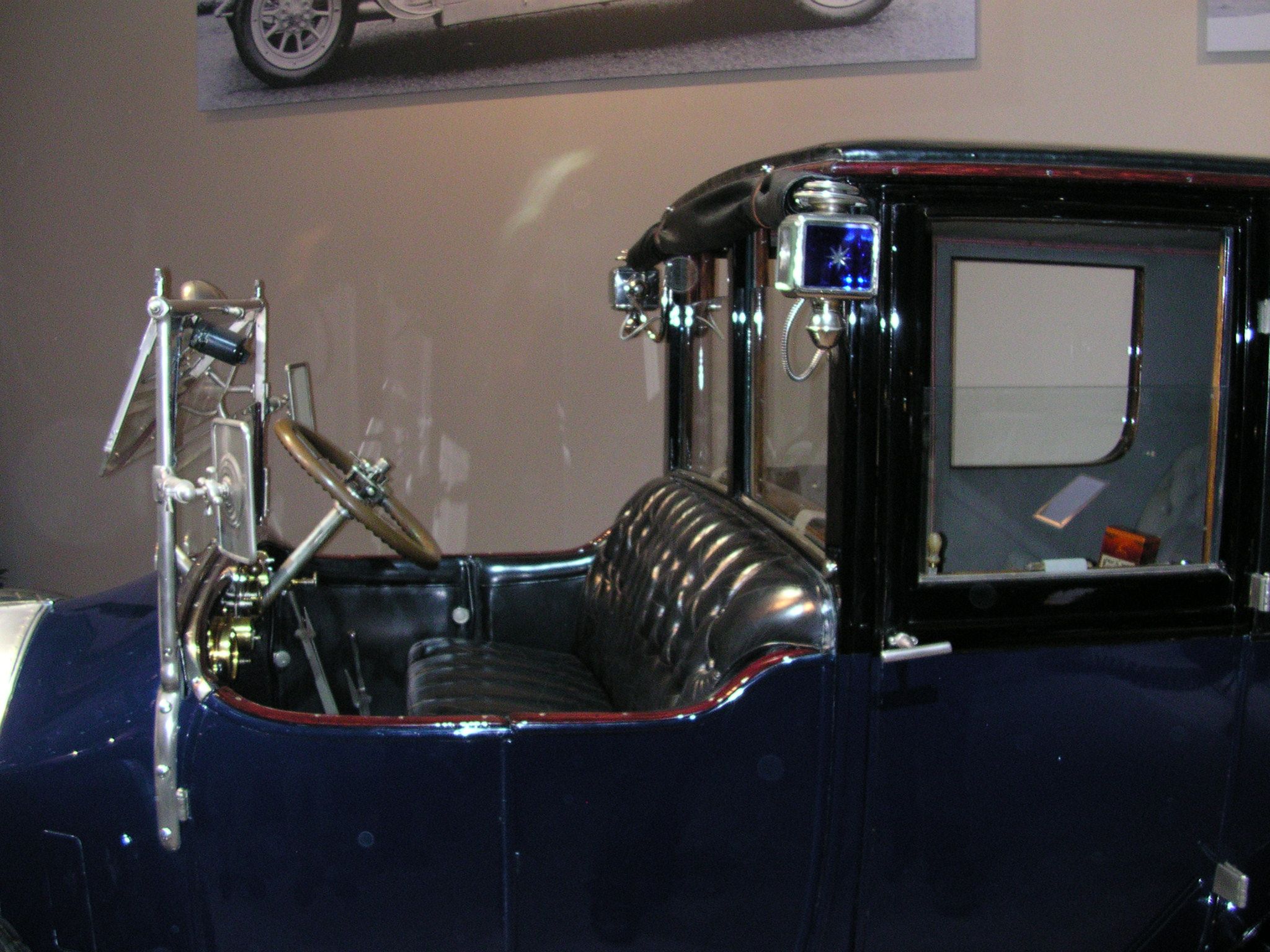
Driver's compartment in a 1920 Rolls-Royce Silver Ghost Town Car

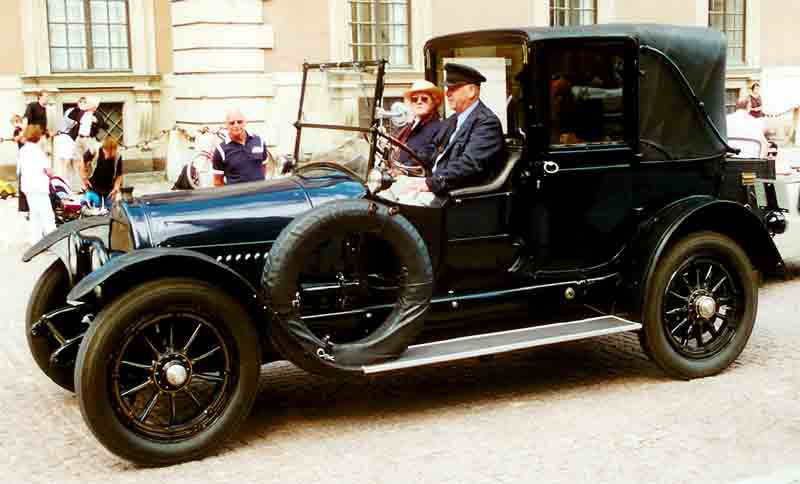
1917 Cadillac 57 V8

=== Sedanca / Sedanca de ville / Sedanca coupé ===
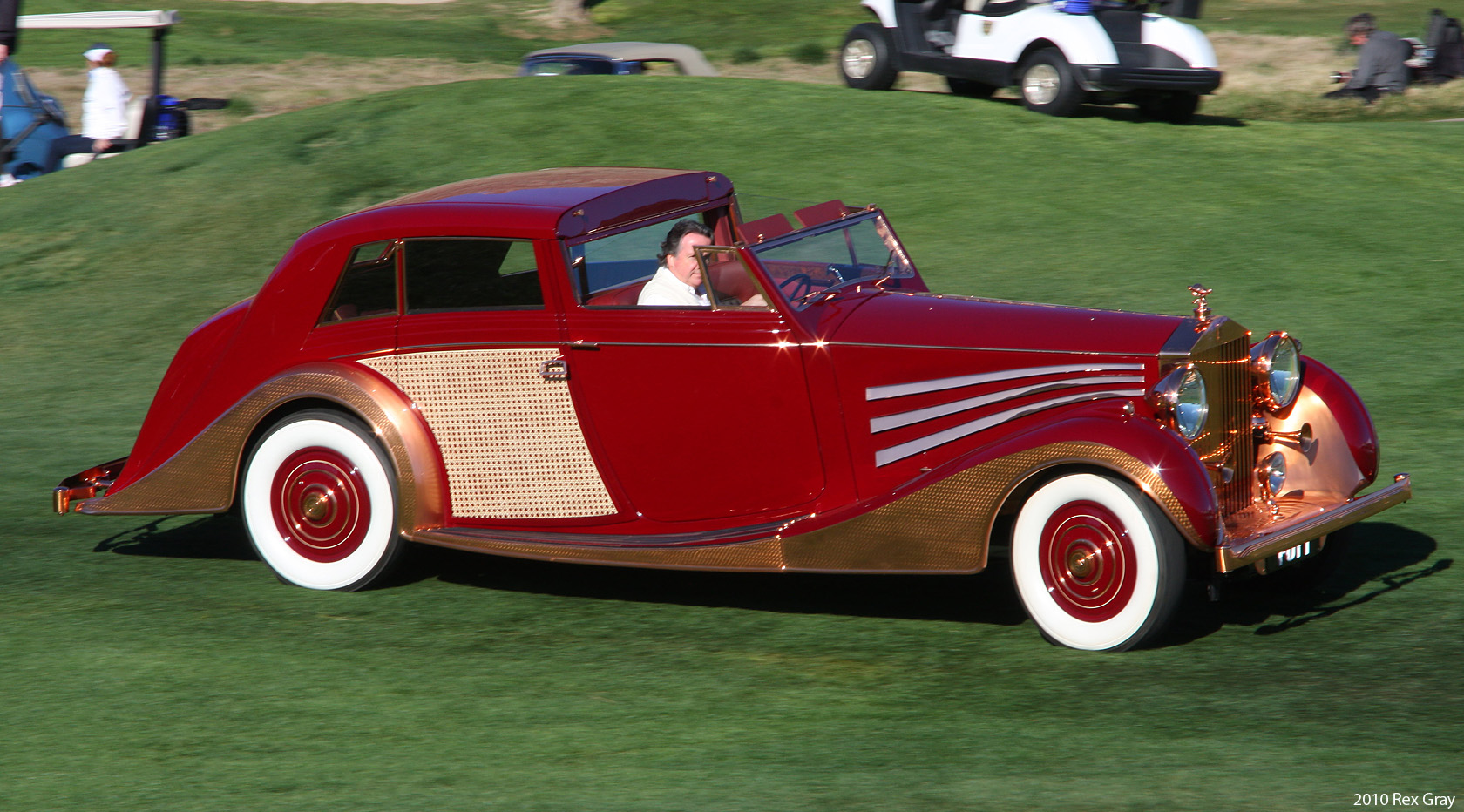
1937 Rolls-Royce Phantom III Sedanca de Ville

The terms sedanca and sedanca de ville were introduced by Spanish nobleman Count Carlos de Salamanca, the Spanish distributor for Rolls-Royce, in his original 1923 sedanca. The strict definition of a sedanca includes a locker for the cant rails and canopy that form the roof.

Usage of these terms in the United Kingdom is unclear. According to one source, "sedanca de ville" refers to a town car variant, and "sedanca" refers to a sedanca coupé. According to another source, sedanca de ville is a redundant term and sedanca refers to a town car.

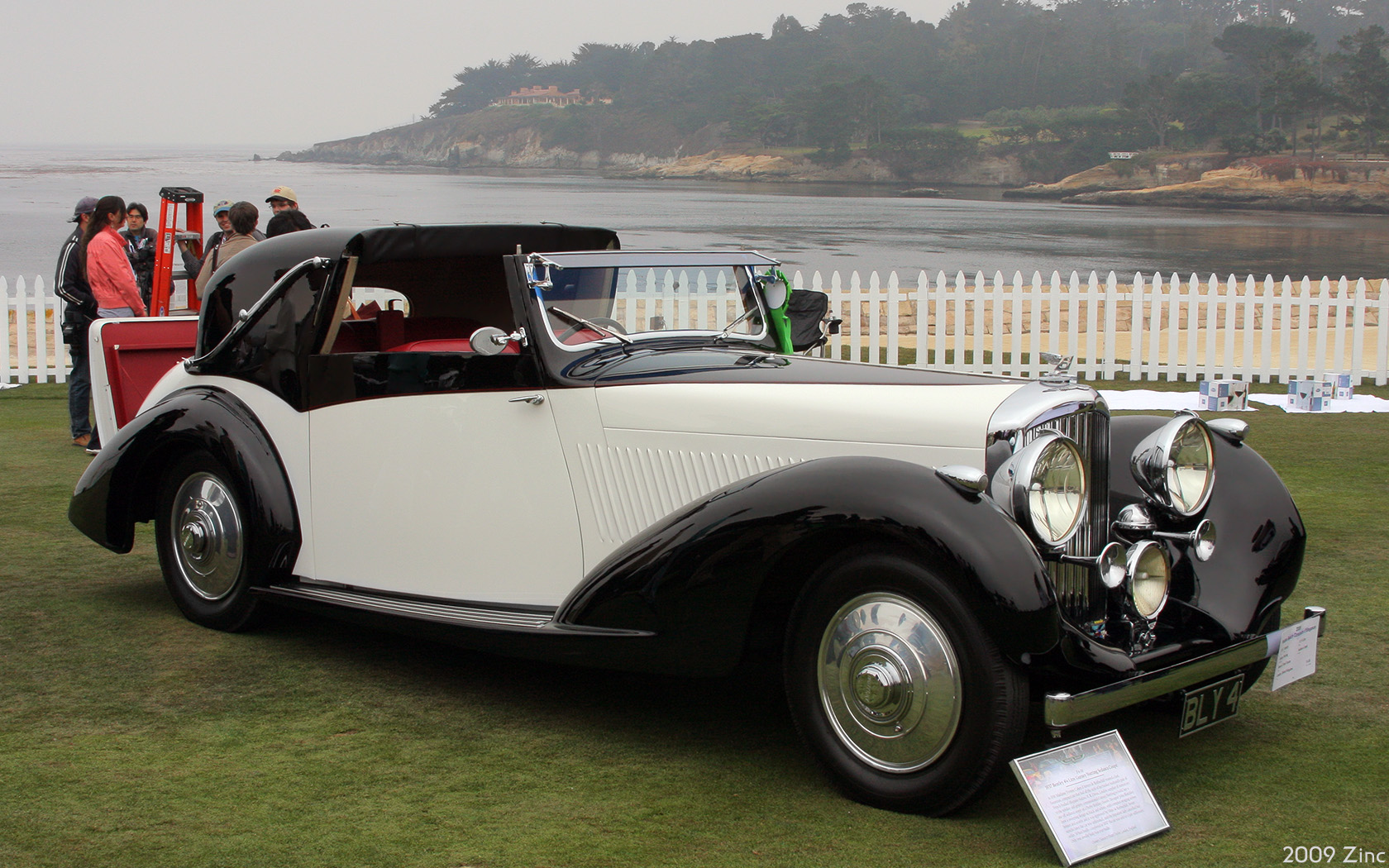
1937 Bentley 4¼ litre Gurney-Nutting sedanca coupé

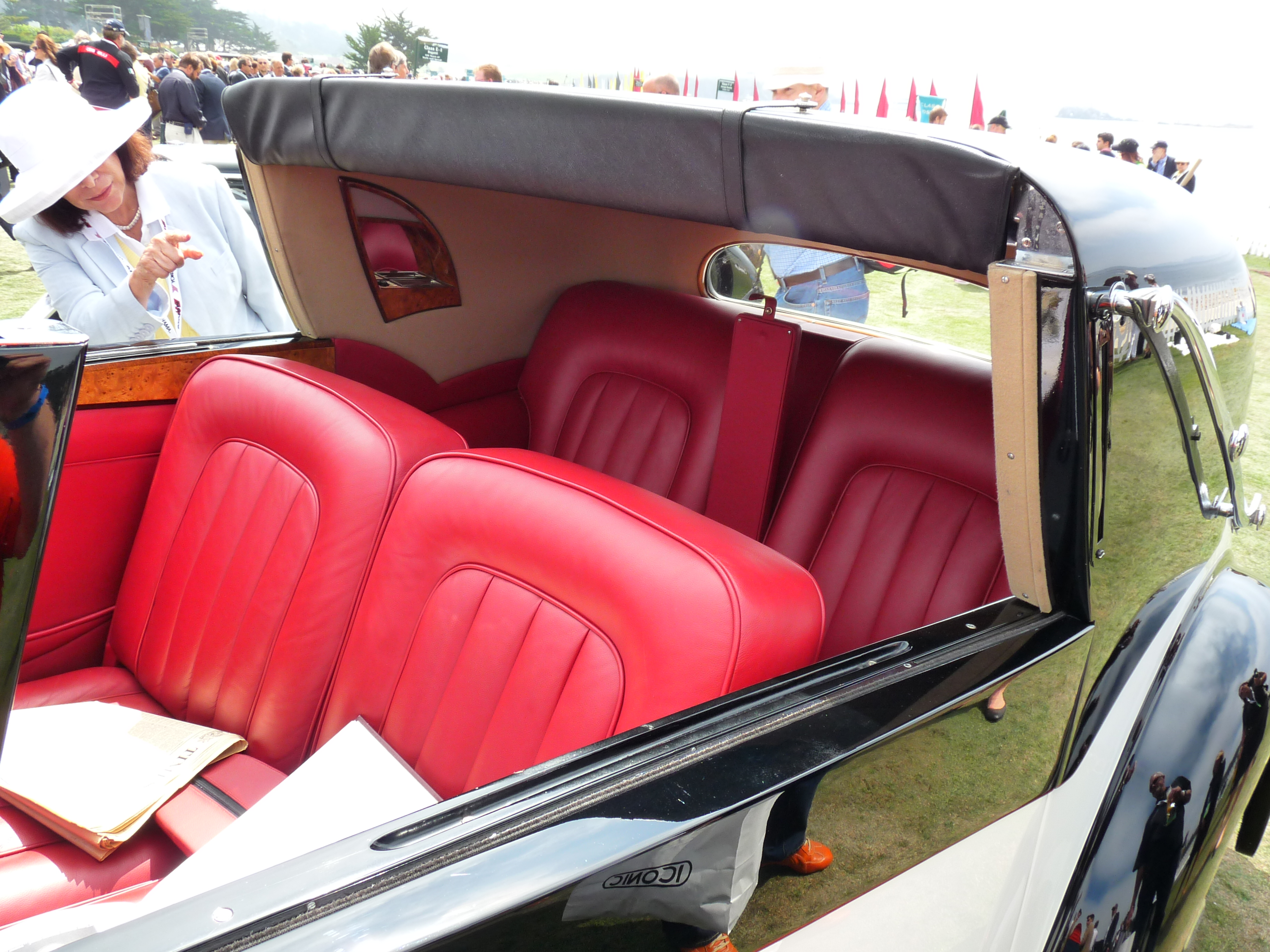
Bentley 4¼ litre sedanca coupe interior

=== Coupé de ville ===
In France, Germany and Italy, the term "coupé de ville" was used for both the town car and sedanca coupé variants.

In the United States, the similar term "coupé de ville" is used for the Sedanca Coupé. A coupé de ville is alternatively defined in North America as a drophead coupé with a three-position top which may be fully closed, fully open, or partially closed, leaving rear passengers covered.

=== Cabriolet-Victoria ===
In the United Kingdom, a sedanca-style drophead coupé with three-position folding top (fully open, covering the rear passengers only, or fully closed) is called a "cabriolet victoria". This variant is defined as a coupé de ville in the United States.

=== Coupé chauffeur ===
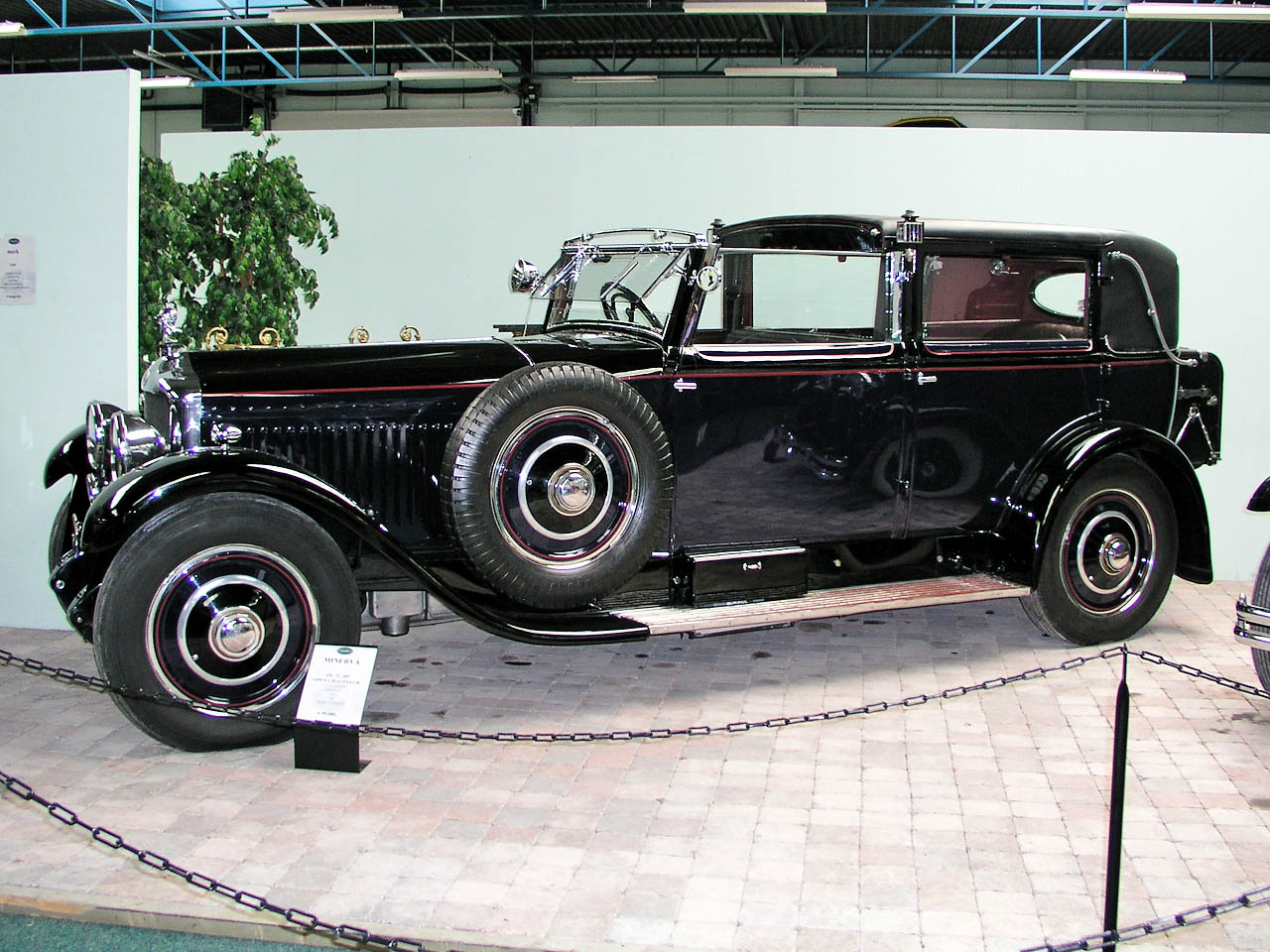
1928 Minerva AK-32 CV

French variant similar to the town car.

=== Coupé limousine ===
French variant similar to the coupé chauffeur but with a longer passenger compartment capable of holding up to seven passengers, with up to three on jump seats usually facing forward. The style was referred to in the United States as a limousine town car and in Britain as a limousine de ville. The term Coupé Napoleon was also used to describe a Bugatti Royale body of the type.

=== Brougham ===
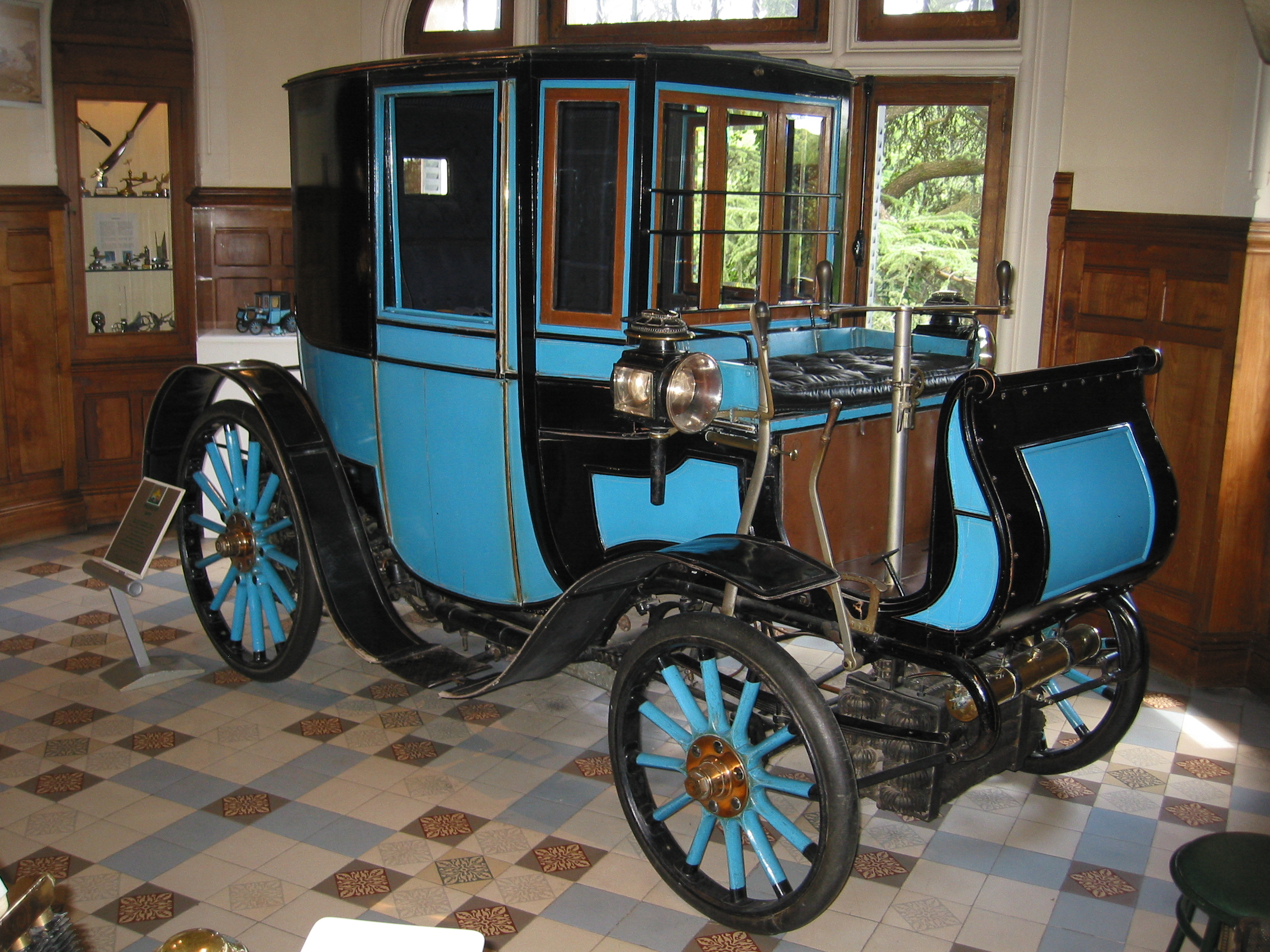
1899 Peugeot Type 27

The term is derived from the brougham carriage. In strict terms, a brougham would have a sharply squared rear end of the roof and a forward-curving body line at the base of the front of the passenger enclosure. The term degraded during the twentieth century.

== Manufacturers ==
=== Europe ===
Due to its high-end luxurious form, bespoke commissioning and resultant design nature, and final high cost, coupés de ville of both types were hand-built in small numbers. The cars were almost always made as individual ("full custom"), or in a small edition with individual equipment ("semi-custom").

In France, Audineau et Cie., Mulbacher and Rothschild became known for such works.

In the United Kingdom, the style was applied to numerous chassis by the various specialist coachwork builders, but it is most often associated via the 4-door Sedanca de Ville variant with Rolls-Royce motor cars, and the 2-door sporting Sedanca variant with Bentleys. Coachbuilders included Barker, Hooper, H. J. Mulliner and Park Ward.

=== North America ===
==== Coachbuilt ====
Due to its historic and luxurious connections, the term town car found early favour amongst many North America automobile manufacturers. The most luxurious were handbuilt by coachbuilders on rolling chassis provided by prestige automakers, such as Packards and North American-built Rolls-Royces bodied by Brewster & Co., and various Cadillacs, Lincolns, Packards, and others by LeBaron and Rollston. Brewster also sold a limited line of automobiles under its own name.

In 1922, Edsel Ford had a Lincoln built with a town car body for his father's personal use.

Seeking publicity and building on his work with Studebaker, Raymond Loewy had two Lincoln Continentals altered to coupés de ville in 1946 using a removable plexiglas cover over the chauffeur.

==== Production ====
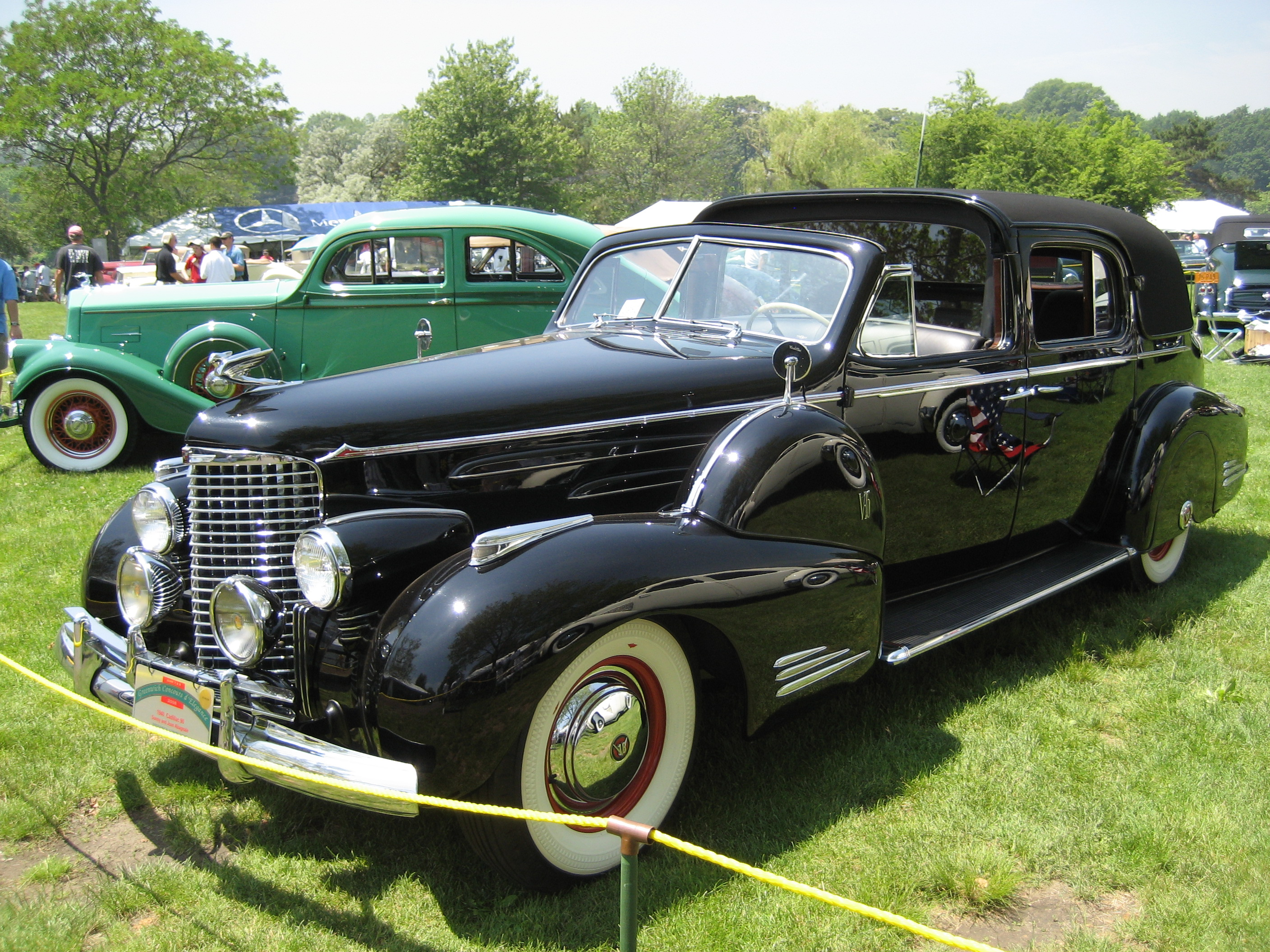
Cadillac town car, 1940

Ford introduced a town car body to its Model A line in December 1928. Designed by LeBaron and designated the 140-A, the Model A town car was sold until early 1930. 1,065 Model A town cars were built by the end of production in 1930.

In 1940 and 1941, a limited-edition model of the Cadillac Sixty Special carried the Town Car name. It was reintroduced as a coupe hardtop in 1949 using the French name for the body style Coupe DeVille and in 1956 as a four-door hardtop called the Sedan DeVille.

== Use as model name ==
Production of cars with the coupe de ville body style ceased in 1939. However, car manufacturers in the United States have continued to release models called coupe de ville, sedanca de ville and town car despite the cars having other body styles; for example the 1959 Lincoln Continental Town Car has a sedan body style.

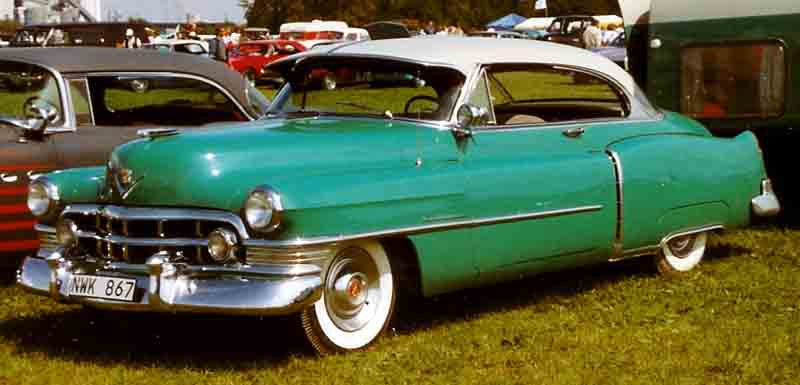
1950 Cadillac Coupe de Ville

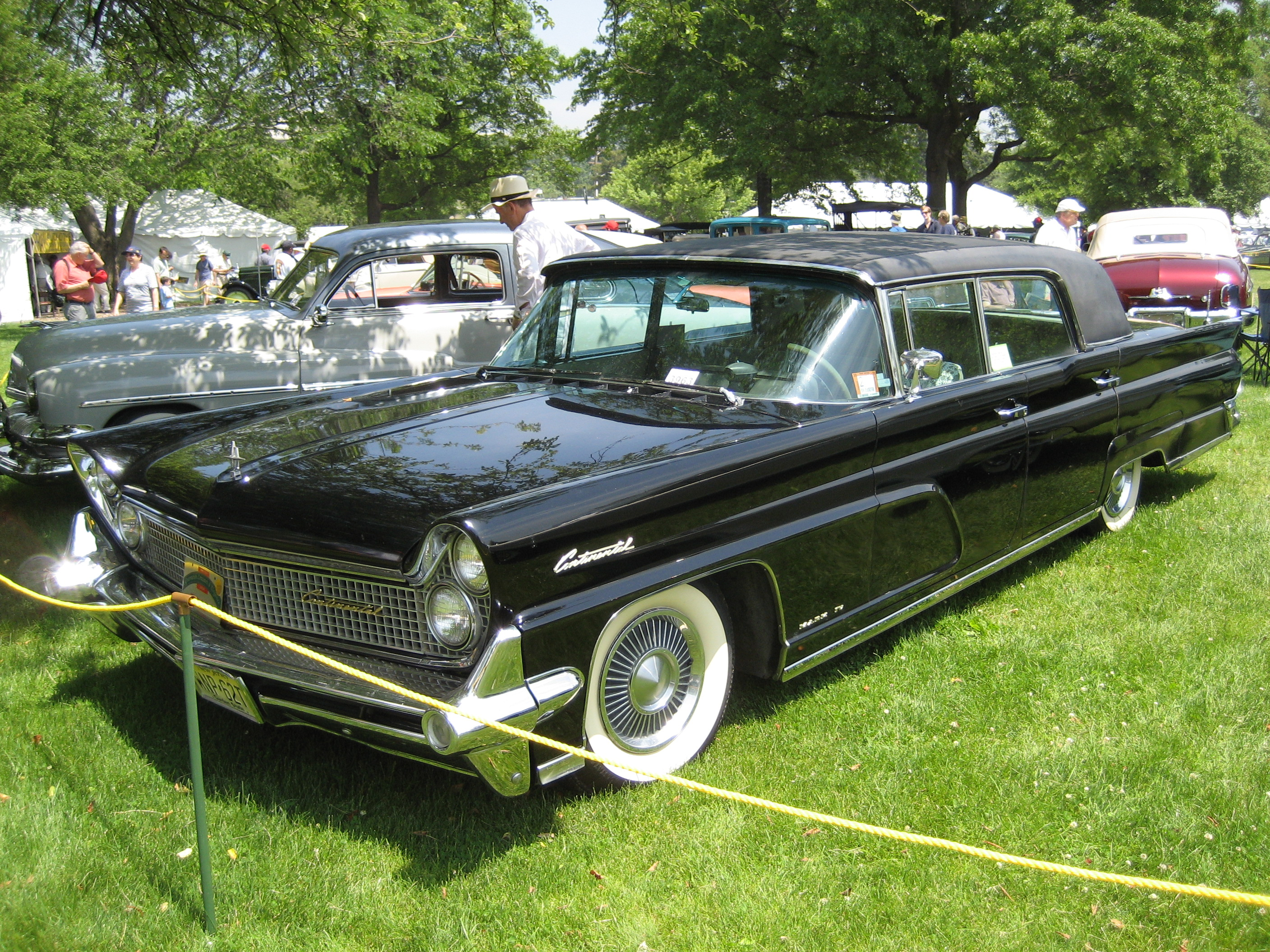
1959 Lincoln Continental Town Car

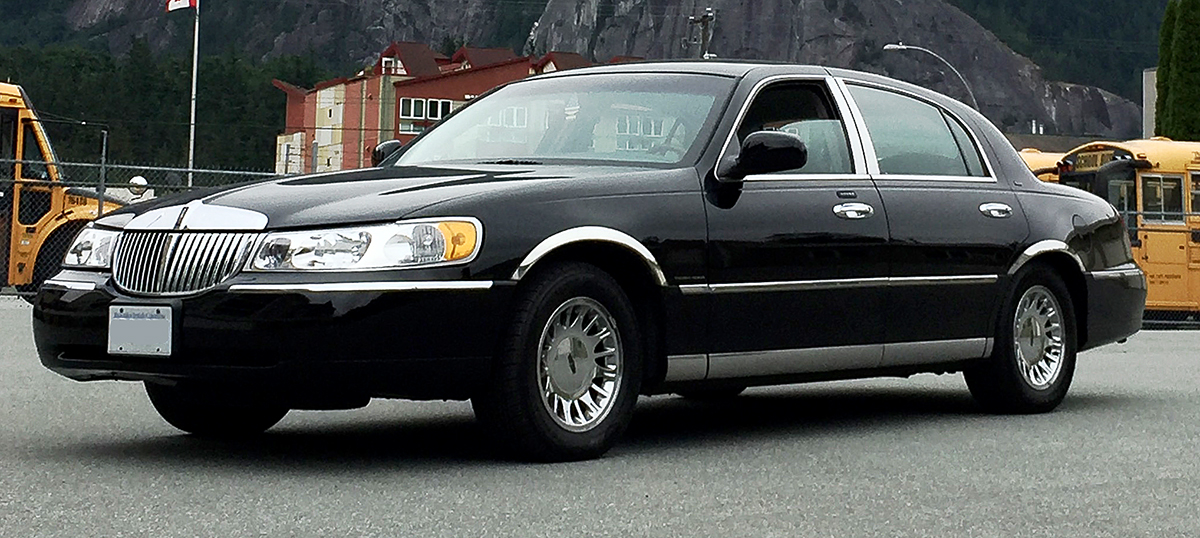
2001 Lincoln Town Car

== See also ==
- Landaulet – the opposite with the rear convertible and the front closed. Landaulets de ville, or town landaulets, were similar to sedancas de ville but with folding tops on the passenger enclosure instead of fixed tops.
- Targa top – also known in the United Kingdom as a Surrey Top. Removable panel over the front seats, while the back of the top is usually fixed.
- Coupé
