= XXVII Corps =

27 Corps, 27th Corps, Twenty Seventh Corps, or XXVII Corps may refer to:

== Germany ==
- XXVII Reserve Corps (German Empire), World War I
- XXVII Army Corps (Wehrmacht), World War II

== Russia and Soviet Union ==
=== Russian Empire ===
- 27th Army Corps (Russian Empire), World War I

=== Soviet Union ===
- 27th Mechanized Corps, World War II
- 27th Air Defense Corps, Cold War

== United Kingdom ==
- 27th (Colyton) Devonshire Rifle Volunteer Corps
- 27th Kent (Deptford Dockyard) Rifle Volunteer Corps
- 27th (Bolton) Lancashire Rifle Volunteer Corps
- 27th (Harrow School) Middlesex Rifle Volunteer Corps
- 27th (Patshull) Staffordshire Rifle Volunteer Corps

== Non-military ==
- 27th Lancers Drum and Bugle Corps

== See also ==
- List of military corps by number
- 27th Army (disambiguation)
- 27th Battalion (disambiguation)
- 27th Brigade (disambiguation)
- 27th Division (disambiguation)
- 27th Regiment (disambiguation)
- 27th Squadron (disambiguation)
- 27th (disambiguation)
