= Type 27 =

Type 27 may refer to:

- Bristol Type 27, a British civil utility biplane
- Peugeot Type 27, an automobile made by Peugeot
- Nieuport Type 27, a French biplane fighter aircraft
- German Type U 27 submarine, a U-boat built for service in the Imperial German Navy
- Type 27, a British hardened field defence of World War II

== See also ==
- 27 (disambiguation)
- Class 27 (disambiguation)
