= Espejos =

Studio album by Ciro y los Persas
- Released: 21 July 2010
- Recorded: April – July 2010
- Genre: Rock, hard rock, blues, reggae, malambo
- Length: 70:04
- Language: Spanish
- Label: 300
- Producer: Andrés Ciro Martínez

Ciro y los Persas chronology
Espejos (2010)	27 (2012)

Espejos (Mirrors) is the first album by Argentine rock band Ciro y los Persas, released in 2010. The album has been certified double platinum disc in Argentina, for exceeding 80,000 copies.

== Track listing ==
1. «Antes y Después» [Before & After]
2. «Servidor» [Servant]
3. «Insisto» [I Insist]
4. «Espejos» [Mirrors]
5. «Banda de Garage» [Garage Band]
6. «Vas a Bailar» [You'll Dance]
7. «Rockabilly para Siempre» [Rockabilly Forever]
8. «Blues de la Ventana» [Window Blues]
9. «Chucu - Chu» [Chucu - Chu]
10. «Paso a Paso» [Step by Step]
11. «Ruidos» [Sounds]
12. «Noche de Hoy» [Tonight]
13. «Malambo para Luca» [Malambo for Luca]
14. «Blues del Gato Sarnoso» [Itchy Cat Blues]

$'''Bonus track'''$# Trapos [Cloth] ∅
