= 27th Battalion =

27th Battalion may refer to:

- 27th Battalion (Australia), a unit of the Australian Army
- 2/27th Battalion (Australia), a unit of the Australian Army
- 27th Battalion (City of Winnipeg), CEF, a unit of the Canadian Army
- 27th Jäger Battalion (Finland), a unit of the German Army 1915–1918 consisted mainly of volunteers from Finland
- 27e bataillon de chasseurs alpins, a unit of the French Army
- 27 Infantry Battalion (Ireland), a unit of the Irish Army
- 27th Machine-Gun Battalion (New Zealand), a unit of the 2nd New Zealand Division during the Second World War
- 27th Battalion Virginia Partisan Rangers, a cavalry unit in the Confederate States Army during the American Civil War
- 27th Engineer Battalion (United States), a unit of the United States Army

== See also ==
- 27th Army (disambiguation)
- 27th Brigade (disambiguation)
- XXVII Corps (disambiguation)
- 27th Division (disambiguation)
- 27th Regiment (disambiguation)
- 27 Squadron (disambiguation)
