= Ciro y los Persas =

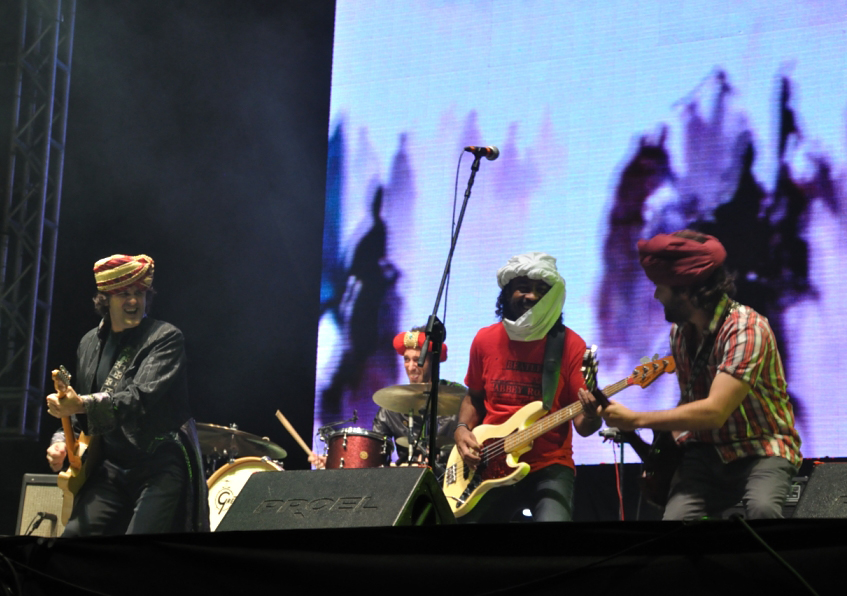
- Ciro y Los Persas in Cosquin Rock 2011

Background information
- Origin: Buenos Aires, Argentina
- Genres: Rock, pop rock, blues, funk, jazz, reggae, candombe, tango
- Years active: 2009s to date
- Label: 300
- Members: Andrés Ciro Martínez; Juan Gigena Abalos; Rodrigo Pérez; Joao "Broder" Bastos; Julian "Lulo" Isod; Nicolás Raffetta
- Past members: Chucky de Ipola; Juan José Gaspari; Diego Mano
- Website: www.ciroylospersas.com

Ciro y los Persas is an Argentine rock band led by singer and songwriter Andrés Ciro Martínez, best known as the former singer of Los Piojos. The band had its first performances in December 2009 in Rosario and Córdoba. In 2010 they released their first album, Espejos, which went double platinum. The band toured the country, highlighted by opening for Paul McCartney's concerts at River Plate Stadium in November.

== Discography ==
- Espejos (2010)
- 27 (2012)
- Naranja Persa (2016/18)
- Guerras (Un viaje en el tiempo) (2020)
- Sueños (Un viaje en el tiempo) (2022)
