= Twenty-seventh of the month =

Recurring ordinal calendar date

The twenty-seventh of the month or twenty-seventh day of the month is the recurring calendar date position corresponding to the day numbered 27 of each month. In the Gregorian calendar (and other calendars that number days sequentially within a month), this day occurs in every month of the year, and therefore occurs twelve times per year.

- Twenty-seventh of January
- Twenty-seventh of February
- Twenty-seventh of March
- Twenty-seventh of April
- Twenty-seventh of May
- Twenty-seventh of June
- Twenty-seventh of July
- Twenty-seventh of August
- Twenty-seventh of September
- Twenty-seventh of October
- Twenty-seventh of November
- Twenty-seventh of December

In addition to these dates, this date occurs in months of many other calendars, such as the Bengali calendar and the Hebrew calendar.

== See also ==
- 27th (disambiguation)
