= 27th Army =

27th Army may refer to:

- 27th Army (People's Republic of China)
- Twenty-Seventh Army (Japan)
- 27th Army (Soviet Union)
- 27th Guards Rocket Army, Soviet Union/Russia

== See also ==
- List of armies by number
- XXVII Corps (disambiguation)
- 27th Division (disambiguation)
- 27th Brigade (disambiguation)
- 27th Regiment (disambiguation)
- 27th Battalion (disambiguation)
- 27th Squadron (disambiguation)
- 27th (disambiguation)
