= 27th Regiment =

27th Regiment may refer to:

- 27th (Inniskilling) Regiment of Foot, infantry regiment of the British Army
- 27th Marine Regiment (United States), deactivated infantry regiment of the United States Marine Corps
- 27th Infantry Regiment (Ottoman Empire)
- 27th Infantry Regiment (United States), unit of the United States Army established in 1901
- 27th Connecticut Infantry Regiment
- 27th Maine Infantry Regiment
- 27th Illinois Infantry Regiment
- 27th Indiana Infantry Regiment
- 27th Iowa Infantry Regiment
- 27th Kentucky Infantry Regiment
- 27th Michigan Infantry Regiment
- 27th New Jersey Infantry Regiment
- 27th New York Infantry Regiment
- 27th New York Volunteer Infantry Regiment (1873)
- 27th Wisconsin Infantry Regiment
- 27th Punjabis, infantry regiment of the British Indian Army
- 27th Lancers, temporary cavalry regiment of the British Army from 1941 to 1945

== See also ==
- 27th Army (disambiguation)
- 27th Battalion (disambiguation)
- 27th Brigade (disambiguation)
- XXVII Corps (disambiguation)
- 27th Division (disambiguation)
- 27 Squadron (disambiguation)
