= Peugeot Type 27 =

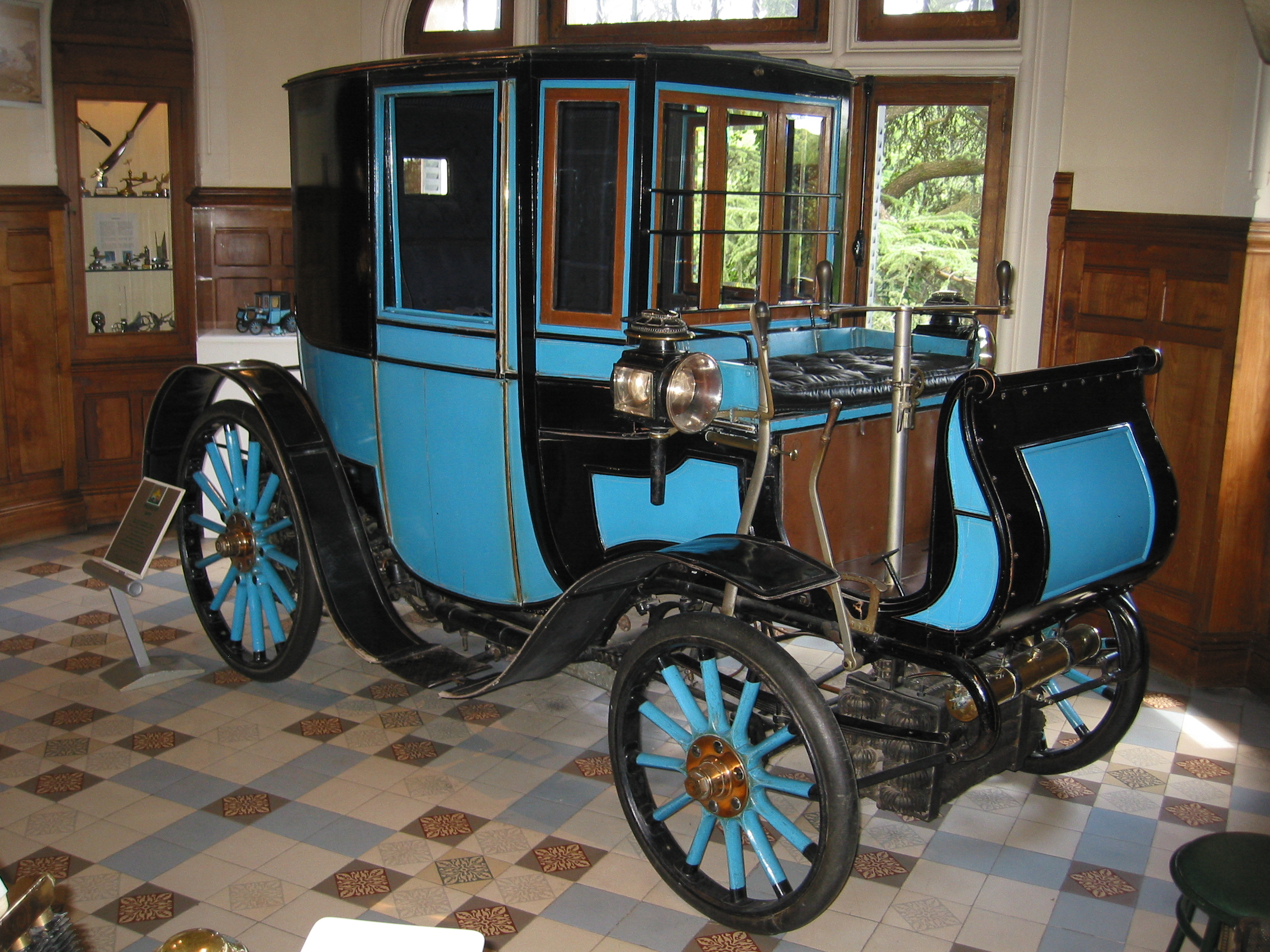

Overview
- Manufacturer: Peugeot
- Production: 1899 – 1902

Body and chassis
- Class: mid-size car
- Layout: RR layout

Dimensions
- Wheelbase: 2,050 mm (80.7 in)
- Length: 3,100 mm (122.0 in)

The Peugeot Type 27 is an early motor vehicle produced between 1899 and 1902 by the French auto-maker Peugeot at their Audincourt plant. Only 29 were produced. This automobile had a brougham car body, similar to the older brougham carriage.

The vehicle was powered by a rear-mounted 1056 cc two cylinder four stroke engine, manufactured by Peugeot themselves. The engine's two cylinders were mounted in parallel and not in the V-format used for the company's first petrol engined vehicles. Although the car was larger than the contemporary Peugeot Type 24 and Peugeot Type 26, the mechanical approach and layout were similar. The engine was mounted behind the driver and his (or, at least in principle, her) passengers above the rear axle. A maximum output of 7 or 8 hp (6 kW) was delivered to the rear wheels via a chain-drive mechanism. A maximum speed of 35 km/h (22 mph) was claimed.

The car had much in common with the manufacturer’s more popular Type 26, introduced the same year, but the Type 27 was longer. A wheelbase of 2,050 mm (80.7 in) supported a vehicle length of 3,100 mm (122.0 in). The car featured a carriage format coupé body designed to accommodate three people. At that time a "coupé" automobile was broadly similar to a closed two door carriage but without the horses.

The Peugeot Type 27 was produced until 1902.

== Sources and further reading ==
- Wolfgang Schmarbeck: Alle Peugeot Automobile 1890-1990. Motorbuch-Verlag. Stuttgart 1990. ISBN 3-613-01351-7
