= 27th New York Volunteer Infantry Regiment (1873) =

27th Regiment New York Volunteer Infantry (1873)
- Active: 1873 – ?
- Country: United States
- Allegiance: United States
- Branch: Infantry

The 27th New York Volunteer Infantry Regiment or the "Westchester Regiment" was formed after the American Civil War after the 3rd Infantry Regiment was disbanded.

== Service ==
John Torboss Underhill was elected Colonel of the 27th Regiment in 1873. The paraded at Morrisania in a line formed by Brig. Gen. Ryder. Upon his appointment it was written: "Col. Underhill then took command, and it is to be hoped will soon be enabled to put the regiment in something like working order."

The regiment assembled at Morrisania for fall inspection by Brig. Gen. Blauvelt's Chief of Staff, Col. Jackson. The muster of 320 muskets was commanded by Col. John T. Underhill.

While in encampment at Martha's Vineyard in July 1878, so much criticism was made about behavior of the regiment in camp, that Col. John T. Underhill responded publicly. In defense of his men, Col. Underhill said: "The men behaved liked gentlemen, as every islander is ready to testify, and the constant saluting of officers by them was almost tiresome."

Documents from the State Senate of New York in 1881 show an unpaid claim of John Boylan for uniforms provided to the 27th Regiment New York Army National Guard while Col. John Torboss Underhill was commanding it in 1877 and 1878.

== Total strength and casualties ==
During a fall inspection at Morrisania by Brig. Gen. Blauvelt's Chief of Staff, Col. Jackson, the muster of muskets commanded by Col. John T. Underhill numbered 320.

== Commanders ==
- Col. John Torboss Underhill
