= U-27-class submarine =

U-27 class submarine may refer to:

- U-27-class submarine (Austria-Hungary), a class of eight boats based on the German Type UB II submarine and built 1916–1917
- U-27-class submarine (Germany), a class of four boats built 1913
