= 27th Street =

27th Street may refer to:

- 27th Street Historic District, Los Angeles, California
- 27th Street station, a railway station in Chicago, Illinois
- 27th Street, Manhattan, New York, New York
- Church and 27th Street station, a former light rail stop in San Francisco, California
