= Peugeot Type 26 =

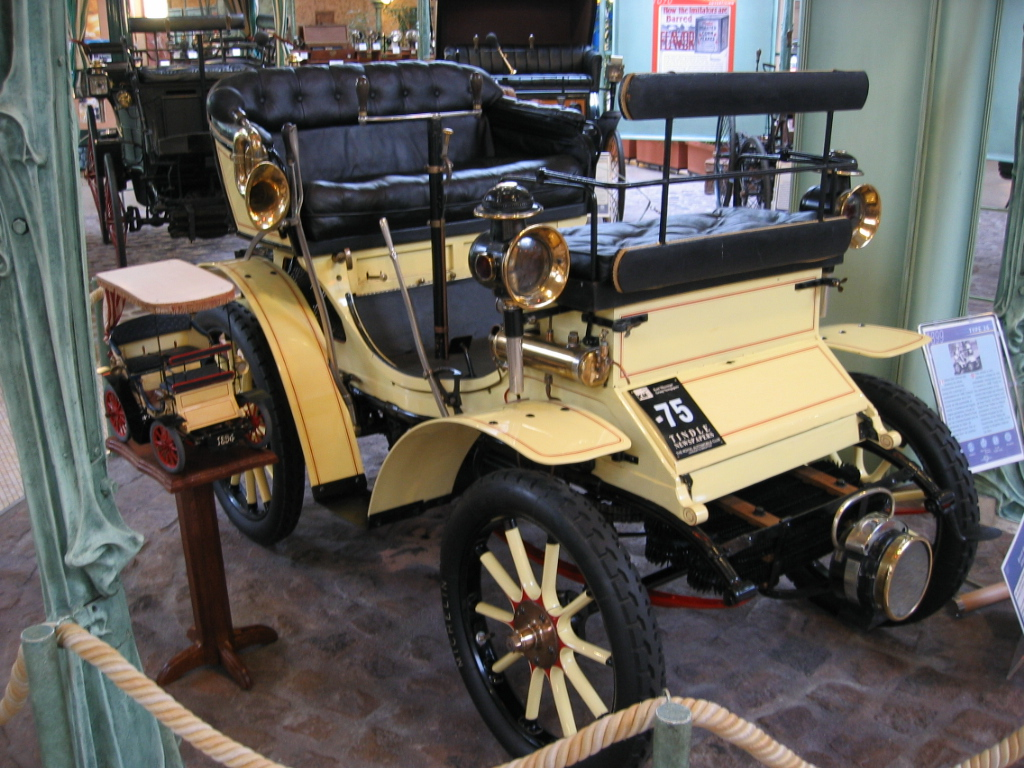

Overview
- Manufacturer: S. A. des Automobiles Peugeot
- Production: 1899–1902; 419 produced

Body and chassis
- Class: Small family car
- Layout: RR layout

Powertrain
- Engine: parallel twin, 360 degree crankshaft
- Transmission: Single chain 3speed + reverse - sequential change

Chronology
- Predecessor: None
- Successor: Peugeot Type 48

The Peugeot Type 26 was produced from 1899 to 1902 by Peugeot. It was larger than the mainstream Peugeot range, available as a four-seater. However, the Type 26 still used the traditional rear-engined layout and chain drive mechanism of Peugeot's earliest cars. By the time it went out of production in 1902, this layout had been rendered obsolete by the introduction of rotating steel drive shaft and front-engine configuration of the Peugeot Type 48. A total of 419 Type 26s were produced.
