= 27 (Ciro y los Persas album) =

Studio album by Ciro y los Persas
- Released: 14 November 2012
- Recorded: 2012
- Genre: Rock, funk, candombe, tango, pop rock
- Length: 65:56
- Language: Spanish
- Label: 300
- Producer: Andrés Ciro Martínez

Ciro y los Persas chronology
Espejos (2010)	27 (2012)	Naranja Persa (2016/18)

27 (Veintisiete -Twenty seven-) is the second album by Argentine rock band Ciro y los Persas, released in 2012.

== Track listing ==
1. Astros [Stars]
2. Caminando [Walking]
3. Me gusta [I like it]
4. Murgueros [Murgueros]
5. Mirenla [Look at her]
6. Barón rojo [Red Baron]
7. Ciudad animal [Animal city]
8. Curtite [Curtite]
9. Héroes de Malvinas [Malvinas' heroes]
10. La flor en la piedra [The flower in the stone]
11. Fácil [Easy]
12. Mi Sol [My Sun]
13. Tal vez [Maybe]
14. L.V.R [L.L.R (Long Life to Rock)]

Bonus track

1. Tango del Diablo [Devil's tango]
