= Deuce 7 =

American artist

- Born: Minneapolis, Minnesota, U.S.
- Known for: Street art, visual art

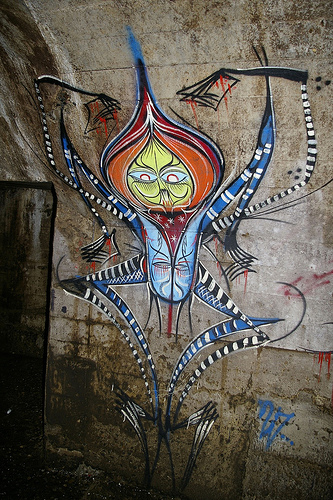
West Kittsondale Drain, Minneapolis

Deuce 7 (also known as Deuce Seven, Twenty Seven, 27) is the pseudonym of an American artist based in Dunsmuir, California.

== Background ==
Deuce 7 has been a railfan (trainspotter) since his early days, and eventually began freighthopping as a means of transport as well as to spread his work beyond the Minneapolis area. His love of trains and freighthopping strongly influences his art. Locomotives, freight cars, and railyard denizens are recurrent motifs in his work. He calls the west coast home, but his monikers can be seen on train cars throughout the United States.

He got his pseudonym from the markings on an old diesel locomotive, BNSF 6127, signing his work with a "27". Eventually it was suggested that he spell the name out "Deuce 7". He currently lives in Mt Shasta, California.

== Work ==
Deuce 7 started working as a street artist in the 1990s in Minneapolis. Since 2006 has been exhibiting work in a gallery in Minneapolis and later in New York City, Seattle, and other major cities.

=== Style ===
Deuce 7 uses aerosol paint, one-shot, and oilbars to create intensely colorful, spidery images of a variety of subjects which he refers to as "stories", which include characters met on his travels, romantic interests, trains, cityscapes, as well as purely expressive, surrealistic images.

His fine art pieces carry the design hallmarks of his street style, and are also typically rendered with one-shot, ink, watercolor, and/or enamel spray paint. Some pieces utilize mixed media including masks, found objects, and baroque moldings. His pen and ink drawings frequently evoke stark, decaying cityscapes of crumbling tenement buildings patrolled by strange vehicles and airborne creatures.
