= 27th Brigade =

27th Brigade or 27th Infantry Brigade may refer to:

== Australia ==
- 27th Brigade (Australia), an infantry brigade during the Second World War

== Canada ==
- 27th Canadian Infantry Brigade

== British Commonwealth ==
- 27th British Commonwealth Brigade, an amalgamated brigade of the British Commonwealth

== France ==
- 27th Mountain Infantry Brigade (France)

== India ==
- 27th (Bangalore) Brigade of the British Indian Army in the First World War
- 27th Indian Infantry Brigade of the British Indian Army in the Second World War

== Iran ==
- 27th Mohammad Rasulullah Brigade

== Russia/Soviet Union ==
- 27th Rocket Brigade
- 27th Separate Guards Motor Rifle Brigade

== Taiwan ==
- 27 Brigade, Taiwanese guerrilla force active after the 228 Incident

== Ukraine ==
- 27th Artillery Brigade (Ukraine)
- 27th Pechersk Brigade (Ukraine)

== United Kingdom ==
- 27th (Home Counties) Anti-Aircraft Brigade
- 27th Armoured Brigade (United Kingdom)
- 27th Infantry Brigade (United Kingdom)
- 27th (N Rhodesia) Infantry Brigade
- 27th Brigade Royal Field Artillery

== United States ==
- 27th Infantry Brigade Combat Team (United States)

== See also ==
- 27th Army (disambiguation)
- 27th Battalion (disambiguation)
- 27th Division (disambiguation)
- XXVII Corps (disambiguation)
- 27th Regiment (disambiguation)
- 27 Squadron (disambiguation)
