= Twenty-seventh Amendment =

The Twenty-seventh Amendment may refer to:

- Twenty-seventh Amendment to the United States Constitution (1992), which prohibits changes to Congress members' salaries from taking effect until after an election of representatives
- Twenty-seventh Amendment of the Constitution of India, 1971 amendment establishing the union territory of Manipur (granted full statehood in 1986)
- Twenty-seventh Amendment of the Constitution of Ireland (2004), which abolished Irish citizenship by birth
- Twenty-seventh amendment to the Constitution of Pakistan, a federal constitutional reform in 2025
- Constitution (Amendment No. 27) Act 1936, which amended the Constitution of the Irish Free State so as to abolish the office of Governor-General, and removed all direct references to the King
- Constitution (Twenty-seventh Amendment) Act, 2017, proposed electoral reforms in Pakistan
