= EAR 27 class =

Steam locomotive

East African Railways 27 class
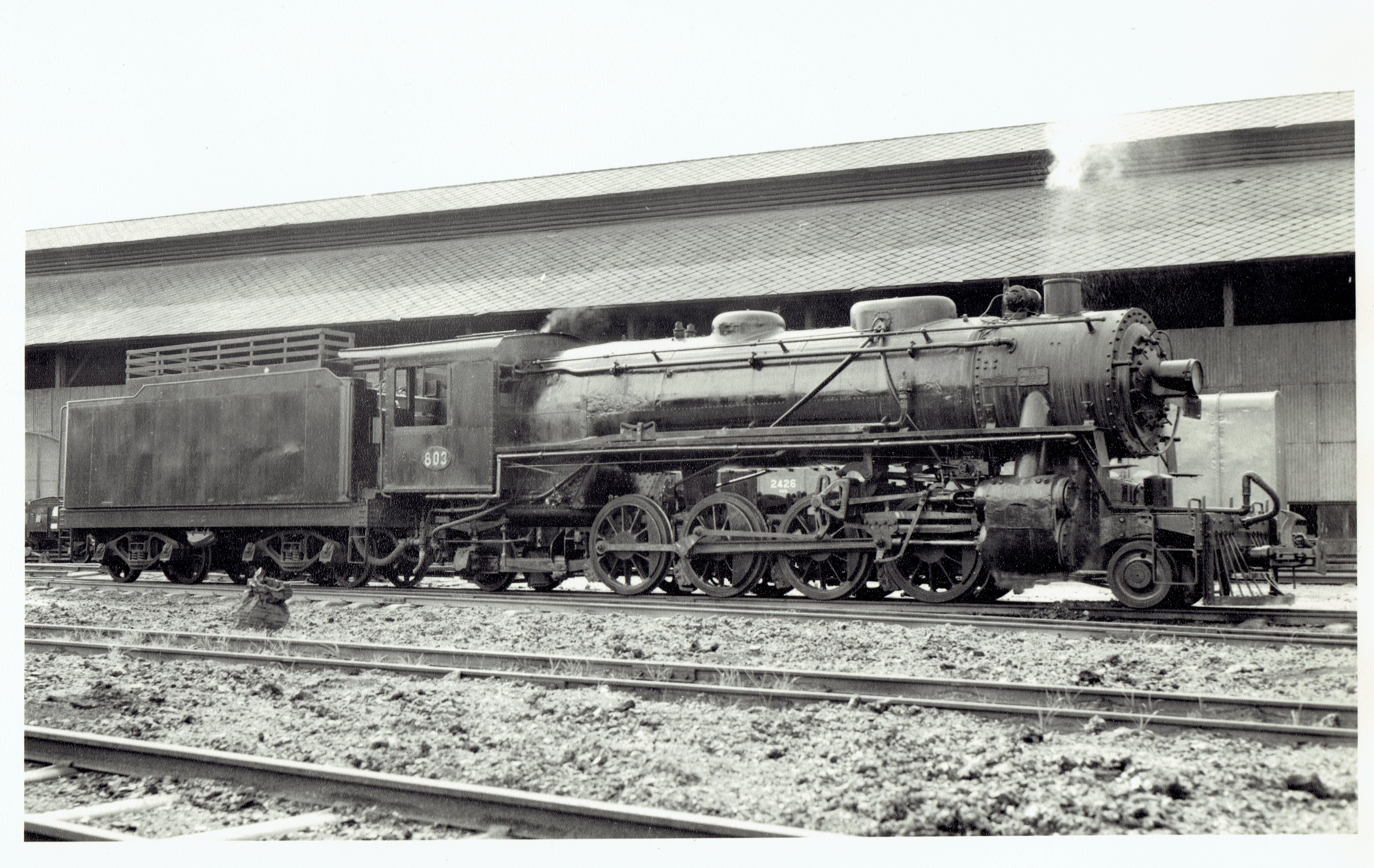
- East African Railways publicity photograph of TR no. 803, c. 1953
Type and origin
- Power type: Steam
- Builder: American Locomotive Company (4); Baldwin Locomotive Works (8); Davenport Locomotive Works (4); East African Railways (1)
- Model: USATC S118 Class
- Build date: 1944 (16), 1953 (1)
- Total produced: 17
Specifications
- Configuration
  - Whyte: 2-8-2
  - UIC: 1′D1' h2
- Gauge: 1,000 mm (3 ft 3 3/8 in)
- Leading dia.: 26 in (660 mm)
- Driver dia.: 48 in (1,219 mm)
- Adhesive weight: 35.7 long tons (36.3 t)
- Loco weight: 52.0 long tons (52.8 t)
- Fuel type: Wood → Oil
- Fuel capacity: 1,350 imp gal (6,100 L; 1,620 US gal)
- Water cap.: 4,166 imp gal (18,940 L; 5,003 US gal)
- Firebox
  - Grate area: 27.8 sq ft (2.58 m^{2})
- Boiler pressure: 180 psi (1.24 MPa)
- Heating surface
  - Firebox: 115 sq ft (10.7 m^{2})
  - Tubes: 1,247 sq ft (115.9 m^{2})
  - Total surface: 1,736 sq ft (161.3 m^{2})
- Superheater
  - Heating area: 374 sq ft (34.7 m^{2})
- Cylinders: 2, outside
- Cylinder size: 16 in × 24 in (406 mm × 610 mm)
- Valve gear: Indirect Walschaerts
- Loco brake: Vacuum brake
- Train brakes: Vacuum brake
Performance figures
- Maximum speed: 85 km/h (53 mph)
- Tractive effort: 19,550 lbf (86.96 kN)
Career
- Operators: Tanganyika Railway (TR); → East African Railways (EAR)
- Class: TR: MR class; EAR: 27 class
- Number in class: 17
- Numbers: TR: 800–805; EAR: 2701–2717
- Delivered: 1929

The EAR 27 class, previously known as the EAR MR class, was a sub-class of 1,000 mm (3 ft 3 3/8 in) gauge 2-8-2 USATC S118 Class steam locomotives operated by the East African Railways (EAR), and, with one exception, previously by the Malayan Railways.

== Service history ==
The first eight members of the class were built in 1944, and were acquired second hand by the Tanganyika Railway (TR) from the Malayan Railways in 1949. Those locomotives entered service on the Central Line in Tanganyika in 1949. By that time, the TR had been succeeded by the EAR, which designated them for a very short time as its MR class, but then, as part of a comprehensive reclassification of all of its locomotives, redesignated and renumbered them as its 27 class.

In 1950, the EAR acquired eight further 27 class locomotives from the Malayan Railways, and in 1953 another 27 class locomotive was built in the EAR's Dar es Salaam Workshops, using spare parts acquired from the Nigerian Railways. The 27 class therefore eventually reached a total of 17 locomotives.

== Class list ==
The builders, build year and fleet numbers of each member of the class were as follows:

Builders	Built	TR number	EAR number	Notes
Alco	1944	800	2701	
Alco	1944	801	2702	
Alco	1944	802	2703	
Baldwin	1944	803	2704	
Baldwin	1944	804	2705	
Baldwin	1944	805	2706	
Davenport	1944	806	2707	
Davenport	1944	807	2708	
Davenport	1944	–	2709	
Davenport	1944	–	2710	
Baldwin	1944	–	2711	
Baldwin	1944	–	2712	
Baldwin	1944	–	2713	
Baldwin	1944	–	2714	
Baldwin	1944	–	2715	
Alco	1944	–	2716	
East African Railways	1953	–	2717	Built in the Dar es Salaam Workshops, using spare parts acquired from the Nigerian Railways

== See also ==
- History of rail transport in Tanzania
