= The Twenty-Seventh City =

Novel by Jonathan Franzen

- First edition cover
- Author: Jonathan Franzen
- Cover artist: Jacket design by Fred Marcellino
- Language: English
- Publisher: Farrar, Straus and Giroux
- Publication date: September 1, 1988
- Publication place: United States
- Media type: Print (hardback & paperback)
- Pages: 517 pp (first edition, hardback)
- ISBN: 0-374-27972-1 (first edition, hardback)
- OCLC: 17619684
- Dewey Decimal: 813/.54 19
- LC Class: PS3556.R352 T8 1988
- Followed by: Strong Motion

The Twenty-Seventh City is Jonathan Franzen's debut novel, published in 1988. A complex, partly satirical thriller that studies a family unraveling under intense pressure, the novel is set amidst intricate political conspiracy and financial upheaval in St. Louis, Missouri, in the year 1984.

== Plot ==
The story proper begins when S. Jammu, an Indian woman who previously served as police commissioner of Bombay and is distantly related to Prime Minister Indira Gandhi, takes over duties as the new St. Louis County chief of police. Her surprise appointment is greeted with confusion and suspicion, especially among the political and business elite that make up the county's advisory board, Municipal Growth. Over the coming months, a combination of a cult of personality, a Native American terrorist group, blackmail, and extortion bring most of the city leaders, including the leaders of the black community, to support Jammu. Those not won over or suppressed include General Norris, a right-wing business owner, and Martin Probst, a local construction magnate. While Probst's initial misgivings are more to do with maintaining impartiality, his concerns are deepened by Norris's reports of Jammu's associates engaging in illegal activities, including surveillance of political opponents.

A proposed merger between the city and county, part of a larger property speculation scheme hatched by Jammu and her cohorts, begins a clash between Jammu and Probst. Jammu acts as the figurehead for the merger whilst Probst reluctantly leads the opposition movement. Further pressure is brought to bear on Martin Probst in order to make him endorse Jammu and his family life begins to suffer. First, his 17-year-old daughter, Luisa, moves out of the family home to live with her older boyfriend. Then Martin's wife, Barbara, is seduced and ultimately kidnapped by Jammu's subordinate Balwan Singh, even as Martin is led to believe that Barbara has left him for another man. Despite the public politics and private intrigues, Martin Probst and S. Jammu find themselves drawn to each other and eventually sleep together.

The merger fails, in large part due to voter apathy, and this major setback in her plans, combined with a chronic lack of sleep and deep depression, is enough to cause Jammu to commit suicide. Meanwhile, Barbara Probst is accidentally killed by a police officer after Singh releases her, leaving Martin's family fractured forever due to hidden causes he cannot understand.

== Reception ==
Franzen's novel was warmly received and established him as an author to watch. In the Los Angeles Times, critic Richard Eder welcomed the book: "Jonathan Franzen has written a novel of our times; so imaginatively and expansively of our times, that it seems ahead of them." In The New York Times, American Heritage contributing editor Peter Andrews wrote, "Make no mistake about it, The Twenty-Seventh City is an impressive debut by a gifted young writer... It's a riveting piece of fiction that lingers in the mind." Reviewing the author's second novel Strong Motion, critic Laura Shapiro at Newsweek discussed The Twenty-Seventh City's "brilliance" and Franzen's "prodigious gifts"; she described the novel as "a huge and masterly drama of St. Louis under siege, gripping and surreal and overwhelmingly convincing," concluding, "The news that he is at work on a third [novel] is welcome indeed."
