= 27th Division =

27th Division or 27th Infantry Division may refer to:

== Infantry divisions ==
- 27th Alpine Infantry Division, France
- 27th Division (German Empire)
- 27th Infantry Division (Wehrmacht), Germany
- 27th SS Volunteer Grenadier Division Langemarck, Germany
- 27th Infantry Division (India)
- 27th Mohammad Rasulullah Division, Iran
- 27th Infantry Division "Brescia", Italy, later the 27th Infantry Division "Sila"
- 27th Division (Imperial Japanese Army)
- 27th Division (North Korea)
- 27th Infantry Division (Ottoman Empire)
- 27th Volhynian Infantry Division, Poland
- 27th Infantry Division (Poland)
- 27th Infantry Division (Russian Empire)
- 27th Guards Mechanized Division, Soviet Union
- 27th Guards Motor Rifle Division, Soviet Union
- 27th Motor Rifle Division, Soviet Union, previously the 27th Mechanized Division
- 27th Rifle Division, Soviet Union
- 27th Division (United Kingdom)
- 27th Infantry Division (United States)
- 27th Infantry Division Savska, Yugoslavia
- 27th Division (Yugoslav Partisans)

== Armoured divisions ==
- 27th Panzer Division, Wehrmacht, Germany
- 27th Guards Tank Division, Soviet Union
- 27th Armored Division (United States)

== Aviation divisions ==
- 27th Air Division, United States

== See also ==
- Monument to the 27th Volhynian Infantry Division of the Home Army
- List of military divisions by number
- 27th Army (disambiguation)
- XXVII Corps (disambiguation)
- 27th Brigade (disambiguation)
- 27th Regiment (disambiguation)
- 27th Battalion (disambiguation)
- 27th Squadron (disambiguation)
