= 27 Squadron =

27 Squadron may refer to:

- No. 27 Squadron RAF, Royal Air Force
- No. 27 Squadron RAAF, Royal Australian Air Force
- No. 27 Squadron PAF, also known as the Zarrars, a unit of the Pakistan Air Force
- 27th Fighter Squadron, U.S. Air Force
- 27th Helicopter Squadron, Yugoslav Air Force
